= 2021 California gubernatorial recall election =

Recall election in US state

- September 14, 2021
- Turnout: 58.45% (▼4.83 pp)
- Vote on recall
- Shall Gavin Newsom be recalled (removed) from the office of Governor?

Results
Choice	Votes	%
Yes	4,894,474	38.12%
No	7,944,092	61.88%
Valid votes	12,838,566	100.00%
Invalid or blank votes	0	0.00%
Total votes	12,838,566	100.00%
Registered voters/turnout	22,057,154	58.45%
- No: 50–60% 60–70% 70–80% 80–90% >90% Yes: 50–60% 60–70% 70–80% 80–90%
- Replacement candidates

If Newsom is recalled, who should replace him as governor?
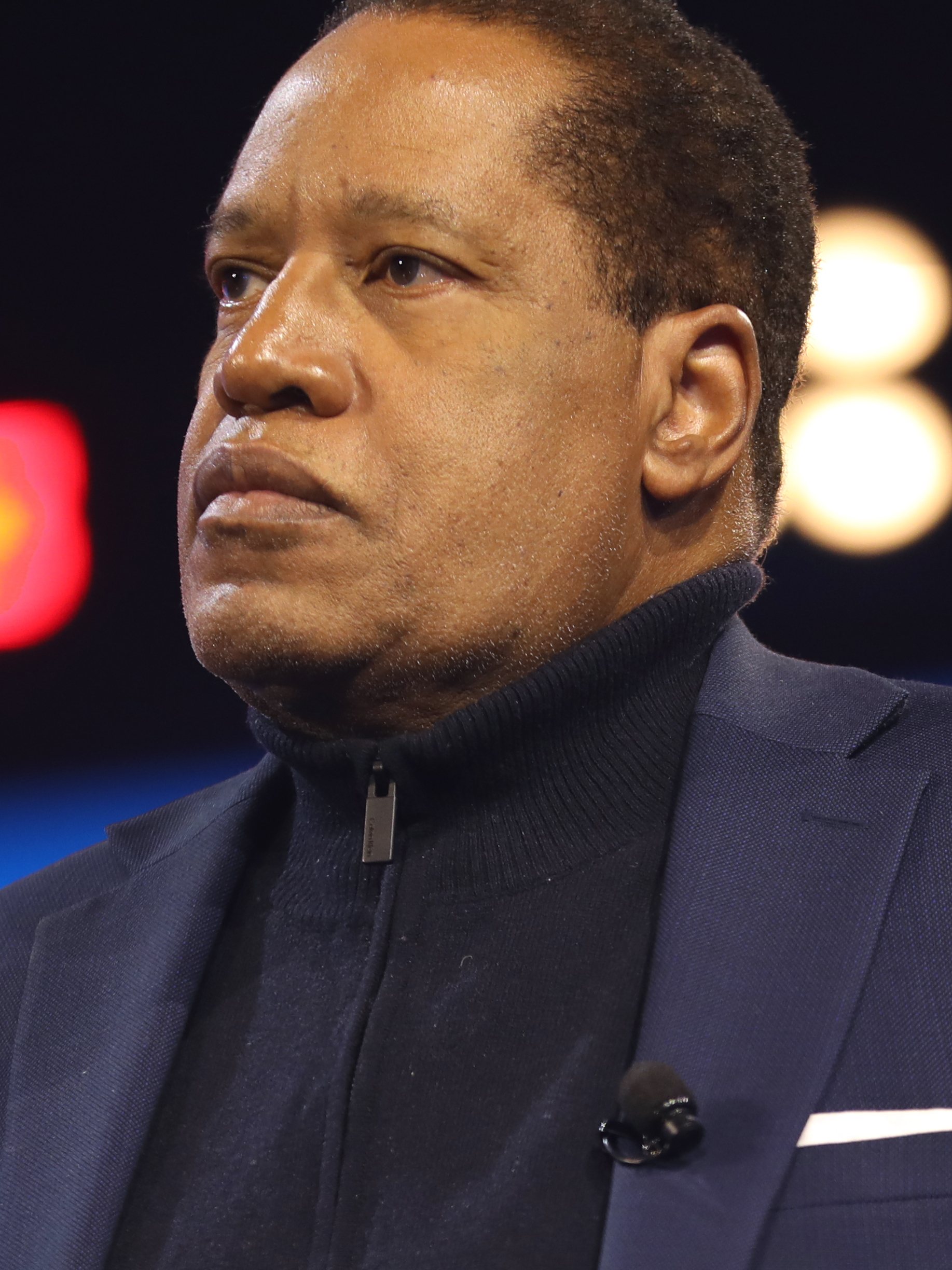

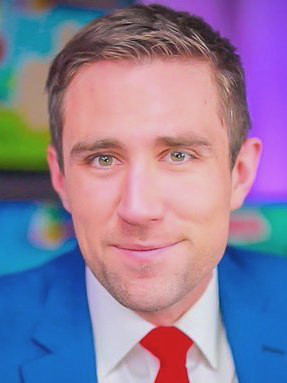

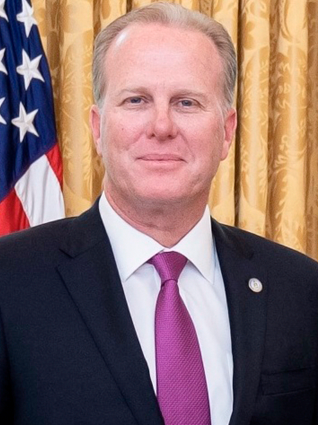

Candidate	Larry Elder	Kevin Paffrath
Party	Republican	Democratic
Popular vote	3,563,867	706,778
Percentage	48.41%	9.60%
Candidate	Kevin Faulconer	Brandon Ross
Party	Republican	Democratic
Popular vote	590,346	392,029
Percentage	8.02%	5.33%
- Elder: 20–30% 30–40% 40–50% 50–60% 60–70% Paffrath: 20–30%

The 2021 California gubernatorial recall election was a special recall election that started in August 2021 and ended on September 14, 2021, when the majority of California voters chose not to recall incumbent Democratic Governor Gavin Newsom, elected for the term January 2019 to January 2023.

Had the recall been successful, the replacement candidate with the most votes on the second part of the ballot would have assumed the office. The election followed the same format used in the November 2020 general election: in August, county election offices sent an official ballot to the mailing address of every registered voter, giving them the option to vote by mail on or before election day, or, when polling places opened statewide, to vote in-person. The recall petition was filed in February 2020 and signatures were collected from June 2020 to March 2021, with the signature drive gaining critical momentum in late 2020 regarding Newsom's personal behavior and leadership during the COVID-19 pandemic.

Voters' ability to recall an elected official in California is the result of Progressive Era democratic reforms intended to reduce corruption, enacted alongside the introduction of the ballot initiative and women's suffrage in 1911. Following a petition drive collecting signatures amounting to at least 12 percent of voters in the previous election for the political office in question, a special election is held. The election was the fourth gubernatorial recall election in American history and the second in state history after the 2003 recall election, which resulted in the successful recall of Governor Gray Davis, who was replaced with Arnold Schwarzenegger.

The ballot asked voters two separate questions: whether to recall Newsom as governor, and which candidate should replace Newsom as governor if he were recalled. All voters could answer the second question regardless of their vote (if any) on the first. Allies of Newsom were successful in dissuading any high-profile Democrats from entering the field of candidates seeking to replace Newsom if he was recalled. His campaign encouraged voters to vote "no" on the first question (whether to recall Newsom) while abstaining from voting on the second question (who should replace Newsom if he were recalled). Largely as consequence of this, while 12,838,565 voters answered the first question, only 7,361,568 voters answered the second.

Due to the wide margin of the results, most major news outlets projected the race for Newsom within an hour of polls closing; later that night, Larry Elder, the frontrunner replacement candidate, conceded defeat. Official certification of the results occurred on October 22, 2021.

== Background ==
Following their ascension into power in 1911, California's progressive Republican reformers introduced direct democracy with the recall (Proposition 8) and the initiative and referendum (Proposition 7) processes, alongside other sweeping democratic reforms like women's suffrage (Proposition 4), to weaken the corrupting power of private interests over the state's government (especially that of the enormously influential Southern Pacific Railroad), and restore, according to newly elected governor Hiram Johnson, "the people's rule".

Prior to this election, the only other gubernatorial recall attempt in California to qualify for the ballot happened in 2003, which resulted in Gray Davis being replaced by Arnold Schwarzenegger. This election was the result of one of 179 attempts to recall a state-level elected official in California since voters gained the right to recall in 1911, one of 55 attempts to recall a governor, and one of six such efforts to remove Newsom. Every California governor since 1960 has experienced some form of a recall attempt. Of the ten prior recall attempts on state-level elected officials in California which led to special recall elections, six ultimately resulted in their removal from office by voters. The recall election was the fourth gubernatorial recall election ever held in the United States; the other three were in North Dakota in 1921, California in 2003, and Wisconsin in 2012.

=== Newsom recall petition (June 2020 – March 2021) ===
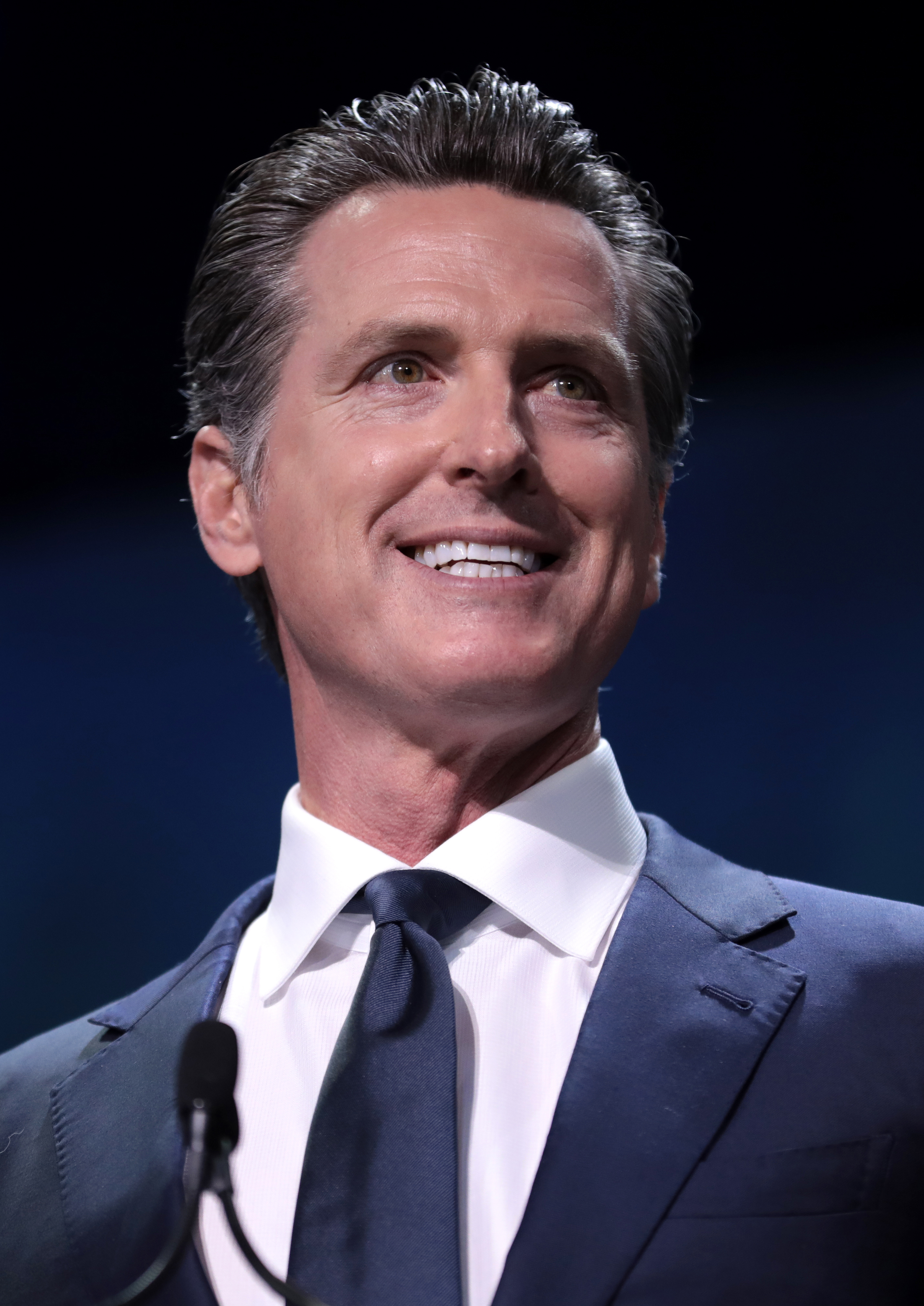
Newsom in 2019

During Newsom's tenure as governor, a total of seven recall petitions have been launched against him. On February 20, 2020, the petition which led to the 2021 recall election was served against Newsom. It stated, "People in this state suffer the highest taxes in the nation, the highest homelessness rates, and the lowest quality of life as a result." The timing of the recall attempt coincided with the onset of the COVID-19 pandemic. The basis for previous recall attempts included the state's "Universal Healthcare and laws regarding illegal aliens" and "homelessness".

On June 10, 2020, then–Secretary of State Alex Padilla approved petitioners' petitions for circulation. The recall petition focused on a variety of grievances, on issues such as sanctuary policies, homelessness, high taxes, and water rationing. Newsom's official response to the petition touted his support for funding education, health care, and infrastructure, noted the State's fiscal health, and warned that the recall campaign was a partisan attack that would result in a costly election.

The recall campaign hired a political consulting firm in late June 2020, and the initial plan was to pay circulators to collect signatures. To ensure a successful validation, the recall campaign sought to gather 2 million signatures. Given the difficulties in obtaining signatures during the pandemic, however, the per-signature cost rose dramatically, and petitioners opted to proceed with a team of approximately 5,000 volunteer circulators instead. The first proponent of the recall, Orrin Heatlie, played a grassroots role in the previous attempt led by aspiring Tea Party politician Erin Cruz. Heatlie, a former county sheriff's sergeant, was motivated by his disapproval of a video in which Newsom advised immigrants of their right not to be subject to warrantless searches.

The petition was initially given a signature deadline of November 17, 2020, but was extended to March 17, 2021, by Sacramento County Superior Court Judge James P. Arguelles due to the pandemic. Arguelles ruled that recall proponents could have a longer time window to collect signatures than they normally would have under non-pandemic circumstances.

==== Party at The French Laundry ====
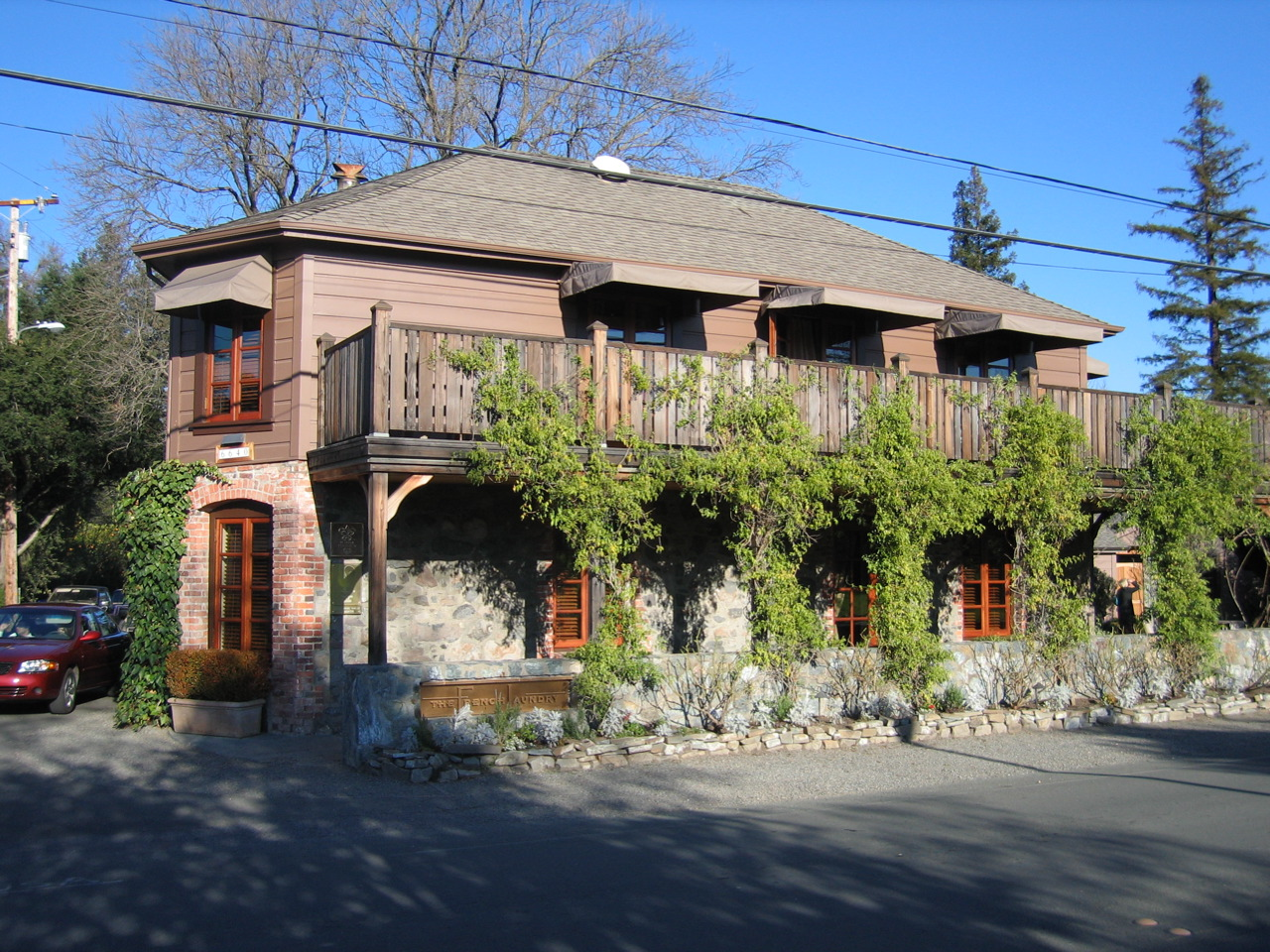
The French Laundry

Newsom was widely criticized in November 2020 for his attendance at a birthday party with more than three households at The French Laundry restaurant in Yountville in the Napa Valley, despite guidelines issued by his administration ahead of an expected holiday COVID-19 surge, which limited private gatherings to at most three households. Also in attendance were multiple lobbyists, including both the head lobbyist and the CEO of the California Medical Association. Newsom and his office initially defended the outing while saying it was the first time he and his wife dined with others in public since the COVID-19 pandemic began, that public dining recommendations were separate from state guidelines for private gatherings, and that the party was held outdoors.

Newsom (far left), maskless and with a large crowd, at the French Laundry

The day after Newsom claimed the party had been held outdoors, photographs showing an enclosed and maskless gathering were published and widely shared. Neighboring diners said Newsom's party was so loud, restaurant staff closed off their garage-like dining space with sliding glass doors, essentially making an indoor dining space. Napa County was in the "orange tier" of pandemic severity at the time, which permitted some indoor dining. Newsom later apologized for attending the celebration. The incident severely damaged Newsom's image and credibility amid the public health crisis.

This incident and voter anger over lockdowns, job losses, and school and business closures were widely credited for the recall petition's surge in support. Other reasons included a $31 billion fraud scandal at the state unemployment agency and pre-pandemic grievances over homelessness and high taxes. By August 2020, the petitioners had submitted 55,000 valid signatures, and from August 2020 through October 2020, a total of 890 new valid signatures were submitted. Coincidentally, both the French Laundry party and the extension of the signature collection deadline happened on November 6, 2020 and between November 5, 2020, and December 7, 2020, over 442,000 new signatures were submitted and verified; 1,664,010 valid signatures, representing roughly 111 percent of the 1,495,709 minimum required signatures and 98 percent of the 1,719,900 final certified signature count, would be submitted from November 2020 to the March 2021 deadline.

==== Reactions ====
Though the state's Republican Party establishment was not involved with the launch of the recall petition, the growing recall effort eventually received the attention and support of statewide and nationwide Republicans, with the Republican Governors Association commissioning a poll involving prospective candidates in February 2021. In January 2021, Newsom refused to acknowledge the developing recall movement when questioned by reporters. In January 2021, Rusty Hicks, the chairman of the California Democratic Party, likened it to the storming of the U.S. Capitol, calling it the "California coup". The comparison drew bipartisan criticism, with Newsom's former deputy chief of staff, Yashar Ali, saying it was "absolutely insane to frame a recall where the voters go to the polls a coup".

==== Certification ====
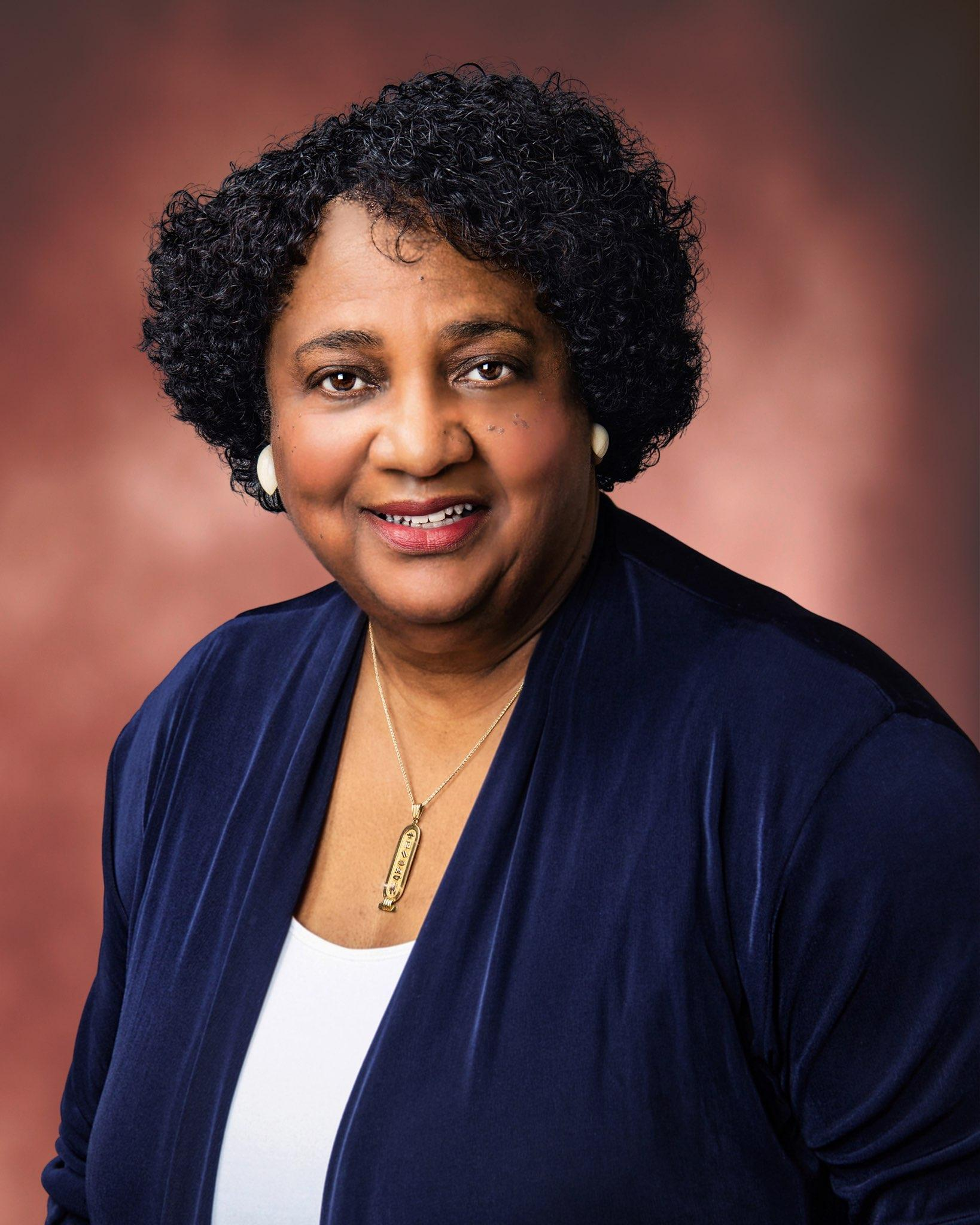
California Secretary of State Shirley Weber, who officially certified the recall petition on July 1, 2021

The recall campaign submitted 2,117,730 signatures by the March 2021 deadline. On April 26, 2021, the office of Secretary of State Shirley Weber announced that the recall effort had gained enough signatures to pass the 1,495,709 threshold and qualify for the ballot, pending official certification after a period of 30 days where voters could retract their signatures (Note: Due to legislation introduced by state Democratic lawmakers in 2017 to delay or prevent the recall of Democratic state senator Josh Newman) and where state officials tallied the costs to conduct the election (up to 60 days). The count yielded 1,719,943 valid signatures, which was roughly 13.8 percent of votes cast in 2018, exceeding the 12 percent threshold required to trigger the recall election. On June 23, 2021, the secretary of state announced that only 43 recall signatories withdrew their signatures statewide prior to the withdrawal deadline, resulting in a final count of 1,719,900 signatures (224,191 more than the required total), and all but ensuring a special election to recall Newsom from the governor's office.

After official certification, Lieutenant Governor Eleni Kounalakis was legally required to call the election within 60 to 80 days (per recent changes in recall election procedures signed by Governor Newsom, which eliminated the election cost review requirements if sufficient funding had been appropriated for the election). The signature drive was officially certified on July 1, 2021 and on the same day, Kounalakis called the election for September 14, 2021 (76 days later and the last Tuesday within the 60 to 80 day time period available to Kounalakis).

=== Recall campaigning (March–September 2021) ===
Newsom's opponents said he was being dishonest when in a March 16, 2021, interview with Jake Tapper of CNN, he said, "I've been living through Zoom school and all of the challenge related to it," since his children had been receiving in-person instruction at their private school since October 2020, unlike schoolchildren in many densely populated and urban public school districts in California. Newsom made the comments while conducting a public outreach effort to address the all-but-certain recall. The COVID-19 pandemic in California led to widespread school closures, the emergence of distance learning, and student mental health and academic challenges, and by the summer of 2021, education became a prominent issue in the recall campaign. Republican candidates said the public K–12 school system failed to adequately serve students after teachers unions' demands led to extended shutdowns, and proposed a statewide voucher system, whereby parents could use their share of per-pupil state funding on the public, charter, or private school of their choice.

Ahead of the September recall election, President Joe Biden and Vice President Kamala Harris campaigned for Newsom. At a rally in Long Beach on the eve of the election, Biden said, "Folks, send a message to the nation: courage matters, leadership matters, science matters. Vote to keep Gavin Newsom." Both Biden and Newsom likened the frontrunner candidate Larry Elder to Trump, with Newsom warning, "We may have defeated Donald Trump, but we have not defeated Trumpism. Trumpism is still on the ballot in California."

Newsom's campaign ran television ads in September 2021 that called his Republican opponents' positions "anti-vax" and called the outcome of the recall vote "a matter of life and death." All four major Republican candidates (Elder, Faulconer, Kiley, and Cox) opposed vaccine mandates, although none contended that the vaccines were dangerous and all said that they had been vaccinated against the virus. Among the Republican candidates, Faulconer was the strongest advocate of COVID-19 vaccination; Cox had an "evolving position" but eventually recommended that everyone get vaccinated against COVID-19, and Elder and Kiley said that individuals should make up their own minds. Elder pledged, if elected, to repeal all face-covering and COVID-19 testing requirements for state workers.

==== Newsom under recall ====
Although the recall petition was introduced in February 2020, before the onset of the COVID-19 pandemic, Newsom's response faced scrutiny by recall supporters and the news media. Many in favor of recalling Newsom cited issues unrelated to the pandemic as reasons for their support.

Newsom presided over an unexpected surplus in the state's 2021 finances, attributable to the recovery in the stock market, the state's progressive tax code, and $26 billion in federal aid, and announced a $100 billion post-pandemic spending proposal in May 2021 which would expand the eligibility for stimulus checks issued by the state to higher-wage earners with an additional payment to those with children, provide rental and utility assistance, and give funds to small businesses. While Newsom was required to return some of the surplus to taxpayers due to the Gann limit, which requires surplus funds to "be returned by a revision of tax rates or fee schedules", the Howard Jarvis Taxpayers Association said the law was likely being misapplied with the issuance of rebate checks to targeted constituencies rather than with the reduction of tax rates for all taxpayers. A report from the nonpartisan Legislative Analyst's Office, published shortly after the proposal was revealed, said that when considering spending that must go towards public schools, pay off debt, or be placed in the state's main reserve account, the surplus was actually $38 billion, not $75 billion as claimed by Newsom, that the proposal was being rushed since more time was needed to determine which solutions would be effective, and that the proposal was "shortsighted and inadvisable" since it requested $12 billion from the state's existing reserves in spite of the surplus. Newsom's Democratic predecessor Jerry Brown said the spending plans were "not sustainable" and said, "I would predict, certainly within two years, we're going to see fiscal stress." Proponents of Newsom's proposal said the high amount of spending was "historic" and would help the economy recover from the pandemic, while opponents said Newsom's proposal was crafted in response to the imminent recall election. According to state officials, a stimulus payment would be issued to eligible individuals starting in September 2021. The first round of 600,000 stimulus checks was directly deposited into bank accounts on August 27, 2021, with payments to other recipients scheduled to be disbursed every two weeks.

In May 2021, Kaiser Health News reported that throughout the COVID-19 pandemic, Newsom was "routinely outsourcing life-or-death public health duties to his allies in the private sector" with lucrative no-bid government contracts. The report said the "vast majority" of awardees were Newsom supporters and donors who had collectively donated $113 million to his political campaigns (including to his campaign to fight the recall), charitable causes, or policy initiatives, since his entry into state-level politics in 2010.

In June 2021, The Sacramento Bee reported that the non-profit organization founded by Newsom's wife, Jennifer Siebel Newsom, had received over $800,000 in donations from companies that lobbied or did business with California state government, and paid her over $2.3 million since 2011 for leading the organization and producing documentary films through her production company, Girl's Club Entertainment. When questioned about his wife's non-profit, Newsom denied that there was any conflict of interest with the arrangement. In response to the report, several recall challengers called for a ban on donations to non-profit organizations of elected officials' family members from companies engaged in business with the state.

==== Partisanship ====
The recall effort was not launched by the state Republican Party apparatus, but rather by activists who had unsuccessfully attempted to recall Newsom before; the activists said the party establishment did not get involved in a substantial way until the recall effort had almost triggered the election.

Newsom did not acknowledge the recall election until its occurrence became all but certain, calling the effort "partisan, Republican". He recruited nationwide Democrats to help fundraise against it. State Democratic leaders warned members of their party against running in the recall election to avoid a potential split electorate, which some attribute to the 2003 recall of Governor Gray Davis, where Democratic lieutenant governor Cruz Bustamante was defeated in his candidacy by Republican Arnold Schwarzenegger. A May 2021 UC Berkeley Institute of Government Studies poll sponsored by the Los Angeles Times found that Democratic voters overwhelmingly preferred having a prominent Democratic replacement candidate on the ballot in case the recall was successful, at odds with attempts by party leadership to prevent such a scenario.

Former Governor Arnold Schwarzenegger disputed the supposed partisan motives of the recall, comparing the 2021 effort to the successful 2003 recall and saying,

It's pretty much the same atmosphere today as it was then. There was dissatisfaction, to the highest level. And it's the same with the momentum. Something that sets it off to a higher level, kind of the straw that breaks the camel's back ... like an explosion.

Democratic strategist Katie Merrill said that the chance for a successful recall in 2021 was low:

Politically, we're a completely different state than we were in 2003. If you look at the statewide races, the Republican Party has effectively become a third party in California.

Newsom sought to connect the backers of the recall effort to "the RNC, anti-mask and anti-vax extremists, and pro-Trump forces", while recall proponents said that the recall was only about Newsom and his performance as governor, and claimed that around one third of recall petition signatories were registered Democrats or independents. By April 30, 2021, nearly a year after the recall campaign was approved for petition circulation by the secretary of state, Trump had yet to personally comment on the recall effort. In September 2021, Trump commented on the recall election, claiming without evidence that it was "probably rigged".

Despite the CDC's mid-May guidance that it was not necessary for persons fully vaccinated against COVID-19 to wear masks in most indoor settings, Newsom's administration decided that California would continue its indoor mask mandate for another month, until June 15, 2021. Reception to the CDC's new guidance among public health experts had been mixed, with some favoring quick implementation and others favoring a delay, including Bob Wachter, chair of the UCSF Department of Medicine, who called the CDC's new guidance "premature". The delayed implementation was criticized by UCSF scientist and COVID-19 expert Dr. Monica Gandhi who said it had no scientific rationale, while potentially causing harm by suggesting there is "still a danger when there isn't one". Isaac Hale, a lecturer of political science at UC Davis, said partisan politics concerning the recall may have been a factor in the decision:

One of [the] top political priorities Newsom has is keeping the Democratic base together, which is why they're really focused on arguing the recall is a partisan Republican endeavor. The biggest thing that could damage that narrative is if a prominent Democrat or progressive emerged as a candidate in the recall, like Cruz Bustamante did in 2003. The key to Newsom staying in power is keeping the Democratic base happy, consolidated and making sure the California Democratic Party is the party of Gavin Newsom, and Gavin Newsom only. It's smart politics since mask mandates are popular among California Democrats.

Jack Citrin, a political science professor at UC Berkeley, said changing the electoral calendar threatened to reinforce the public's cynicism about politicians using any means available to stay in power, and that they were "trying to create a situation that is most favorable for the partisan outcome that they favor". The changes were heavily criticized by Newsom's Republican opponents.

In August, recall proponents filed suit challenging language proposed by Newsom for the voter information handbook, alleging it falsely or misleading characterized the recall as a "power grab" by "Republicans and Trump supporters". On August 5, 2021, Sacramento County Superior Court Judge Laurie M. Earl ruled against the suit and allowed inclusion of the disputed language, saying, "There is nothing false or misleading about describing the recall effort's leaders as Trump supporters." Judge Earl wrote that while it may have been an exaggeration to describe the election as a "Republican recall", the rhetoric was "common to political debate" and "permissible".

On July 24, 2021, the California Republican Party's steering committee voted to allow the party to endorse a candidate in the recall election, if the candidate received at least 60 percent of delegate votes in an upcoming August 7 meeting. Some Republicans opposed the move out of concern that endorsing a single candidate would reduce Republican voter turnout. On August 7, the party voted to cancel the endorsement vote and issue no endorsement; prior to the cancellation of the endorsement vote, Republican delegates were set to choose an endorsee from the four candidates who each had received the support of at least 200 delegates, which were Larry Elder, Kevin Faulconer, Kevin Kiley, and Doug Ose.

With political allies having successfully dissuaded prospective high-level Democrats from joining the race, Newsom's campaign urged supporters to skip the second question on the recall ballot. The directive was criticized by nonpartisan political observers, who said that it was misleading and could cause voter confusion.

=== Recall election (September 2021) ===
==== Election administration ====
After some blueprints of the Dominion Voting Systems voting machines were leaked, a group of eight cybersecurity experts called, in a letter to Secretary of State Shirley Weber, for rigorous auditing of the recall election with a risk-limiting audit to mitigate any cyberattack risk. The experts wrote that they had no evidence of a hacking threat, and did not cast any blame on Dominion, but said that the state and counties should take steps to ensure that "the release of the Dominion software into the wild" did not increase election security risks. The California Secretary of State's office said the 40 counties in California using Dominion election management system use a different version of the software that meets state requirements, and noted that California election systems have layered security protections, including routine vulnerability testing, pre-election testing, access controls, and physical security. California also uses paper ballots with a voter-verified paper audit trail, another security measure.

==== Larry Elder's unsubstantiated fraud claim prior to election day ====
The day before the end of voting, candidate Larry Elder claimed on his campaign website that fraud had already been detected and linked to a petition for citizens to sign "demanding a special session of the California legislature to investigate and ameliorate the twisted results" of the election, though no vote totals had yet been reported. The post also referred to Newsom having been "reinstated," leading NBC news to speculate that the post had been intended for publication the following day and mistakenly released early, and that the Elder campaign had anticipated that Elder would lose. Elder would concede defeat on election day. His claim that cast doubt on the legitimacy of the election result was accompanied by similar unsubstantiated claims from former president Donald Trump and several right-wing media figures.

== California's recall process ==
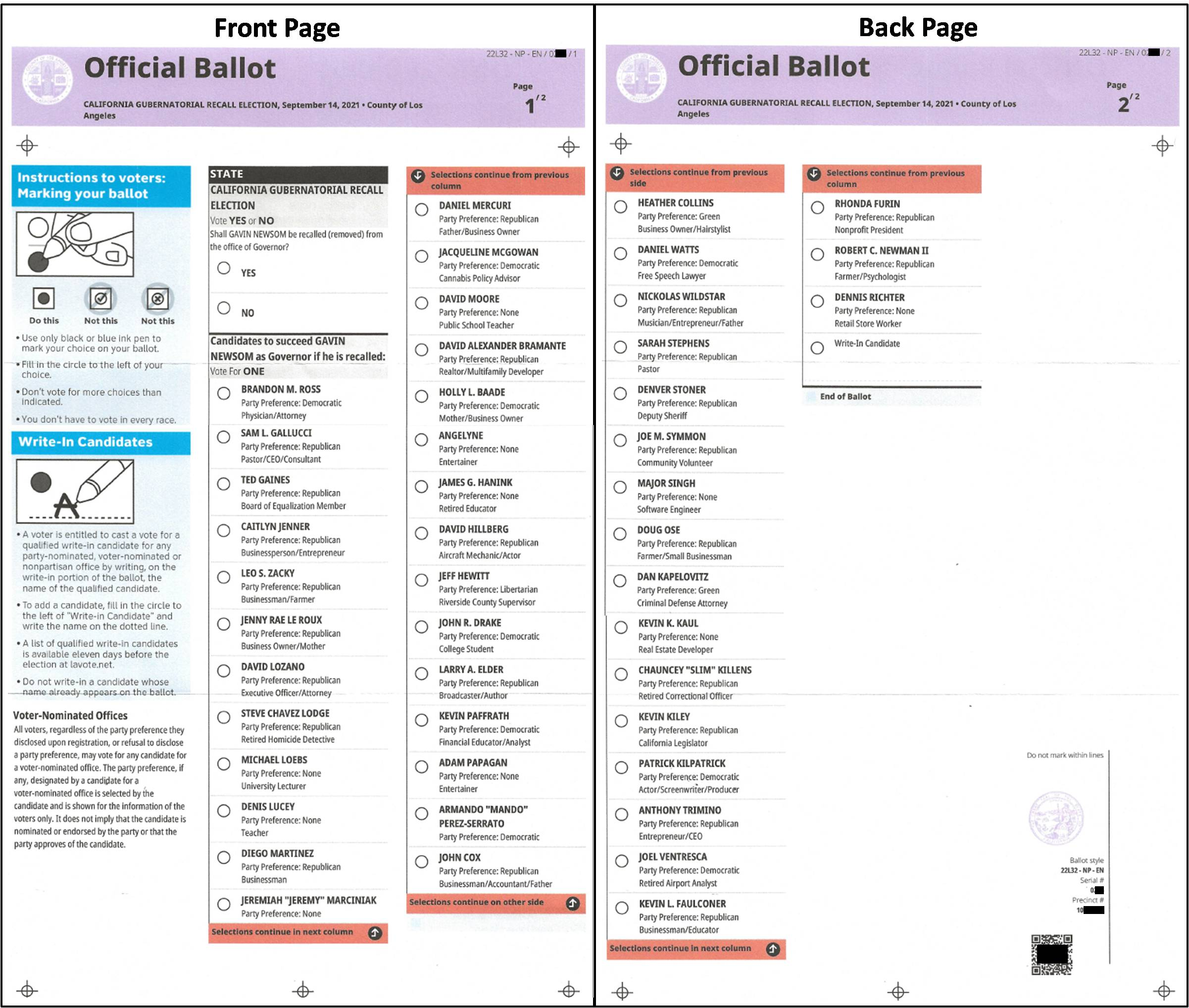
An image of a ballot from Los Angeles County. The listed order of the replacement candidates was determined by a randomization of the alphabet. The starting point, however, gets shifted for each of the state's 80 Assembly Districts (hence, all 46 candidates appear at the top of the ballot in at least one assembly district, with 34 candidates being listed first in two assembly districts).

As of 2021, California is one of 19 states to allow recall elections. Under state law, any elected official may be subjected to a recall. To trigger a recall election of a statewide elected official, proponents must gather a certain number of signatures from registered voters within a certain time period. The number must equal at least 12 percent of the votes cast in the previous election for that office. Based on the previous gubernatorial election, the 2021 recall petition required 1,495,709 signatures. When the secretary of state confirms that a recall petition meets the required number of signatures, a recall election must be scheduled within 60 to 80 days. If the petition qualifies fewer than 180 days prior to the next regularly scheduled election, then the recall becomes part of that regularly scheduled election. In the case of a recall against the governor, the responsibility for scheduling the recall election falls on the lieutenant governor, which in 2021 was Eleni Kounalakis.

A recall ballot in California consists of two parts: whether the incumbent should be recalled, and a selection of replacement candidates in the event they are recalled. If a simple majority of those who cast ballots favors removing the incumbent by selecting "YES" on the first question, then the replacement candidate who receives the most votes (a type of plurality voting) finishes out the incumbent's term in office. A voter is allowed a single unranked vote when choosing a preferred replacement candidate, irrespective of their response to the first question. If the recall had been successful, the new governor would have taken office 38 days after the election and served the remainder of the term through January 2, 2023. Following legislation, all registered voters would be mailed a ballot for any elections held in 2021, including the recall election (subsequent legislation signed by Governor Newsom in September 2021 would mandate the same universal mail-in format for all future state and local elections).

=== Changes to state recall election laws ===
Though California's recall process remains fundamentally unchanged since its introduction in 1911, beginning in 2017 and up to the 2021 gubernatorial recall, California's Democratic-led government enacted legislation to change how recall elections are conducted. Several lawmakers and academics also proposed more substantial changes during the 2021 recall campaign that would later fail in the legislature and the courts; similar rule changes were proposed during California's 2003 recall election campaign that targeted Democrat Gray Davis. In addition, a new election law was applied to the 2021 recall election, though its application would later be ruled invalid in court.

==== Recall election timeline (SB 117 and SB 152) ====
In 2017, ahead of the successful recall of State Senator Josh Newman (D-Fullerton), Democratic legislators changed the law concerning recall elections with Senate Bill 117 to give voters 30 business days to withdraw their names from the recall petition. The 2017 law change also added a 30-day period for the state Department of Finance to conduct a cost estimate and gave the Joint Legislative Budget Committee 30 days to review the estimate.

On June 28, 2021, Newsom signed Senate Bill 152 into law, which allowed for his recall election to be held as early as August 2021 by allowing for a shorter recall timeline, which had been lengthened prior to the recall of Senator Newman. The changes allowed the lieutenant governor to set a date for the recall without waiting for the Joint Legislative Budget Committee to review the cost estimate "so long as the Legislature has appropriated the funds it determines 'reasonably necessary' to conduct the recall election". With the same law change, the legislature appropriated $250 million to administer the recall election.

==== Election cost ====
While Newsom's pre-pandemic response to the recall effort in early 2020 warned that a special recall election would cost $81 million, county officials estimated in June 2021 that a statewide recall election, which at the time was expected to be held in the fall of 2021, would cost taxpayers $215 million. This higher estimate had presumed higher paper costs due to California's requirements for universal mail-in ballots instituted during the COVID-19 pandemic, which covered all elections held in 2020 and 2021, as well as a lengthy recall calendar featuring the rule changes enacted in 2017, ahead of Senator Newman's recall.

With the shortened timeline from SB 152 now ensuring a summertime election, California's county election clerks nonetheless urged Lieutenant Governor Kounalakis to schedule the election as late as possible, citing an inability to guarantee a successful August election, possible voter confusion, and the potential for costs far beyond the original estimate. A summertime election, held in late August or early September, could have helped Newsom defeat the recall by avoiding political fallout over fires, virus variants, or school reopenings, which could coincide with what had been anticipated to be a late October or early November recall election; this strategic advantage was the rationale for public advocacy for an earlier election by Democratic state senator Steve Glazer. On July 1, the Department of Finance released an estimate of the cost of the September 14, 2021 election at $276 million, an increase of $61 million from the prior $215 million estimated by county election offices.

Newsom's campaign and Democratic legislative leaders of both state houses had criticized the recall election as a waste of taxpayer money, while recall proponents said, "You can't put a price on democracy," and that some costs could have been avoided if officials allowed for a "traditional" election without universal mail-in ballots. While the projected $276 million cost of the recall was close to the $292 million spent on the 2020 general election in California, which was the first to feature universal mail-in ballots, the cost per voter was significantly higher than in the 2018 midterm elections.

Secretary of State Weber said in an interview with KABC-TV that the recall election's total cost by election day had surpassed $276 million and was on track to eventually exceed $300 million. On February 3, 2022, election officials released a final tally of the costs for the recall election, at a little over $200.2 million.

==== Incumbent's party preference (SB 151) ====
In 2019, Newsom signed Senate Bill 151 into law, which gave recall targets the right to state their party preference on the recall ballot. Newsom was unable to take advantage of the new law after his campaign missed a February 2020 deadline (when the recall petition was filed) to state his party preference. In June and July 2021, Newsom's campaign sued Secretary of State Shirley Weber (whom he appointed earlier in 2021) over the issue, but lost the case. Weber sided with him, telling the judge that voters would benefit from knowing Newsom's political party preference. The lawyers arguing the case in opposition to Newsom before Judge James P. Arguelles (who had also approved the recall signature deadline extension) represented replacement candidate Caitlyn Jenner and proponents of the recall.

==== Misapplication of tax return disclosure law (SB 27) ====
A new requirement for gubernatorial candidates to disclose their most recent tax returns was passed into law in 2019, when Governor Newsom signed Senate Bill 27. (Note: The law also imposed a similar disclosure requirement on presidential candidates, primarily aimed at forcing Donald Trump to release his most recent tax returns when he ran in 2020. The disclosure requirement for presidential candidates was struck down by the courts.) Although the language of the law says that gubernatorial candidates must publicize the prior five years of their tax returns in order for their names to appear on a "primary ballot", the secretary of state applied the law to the recall election. The law has been cited as a potential reason for the major reduction in recall replacement candidates relative to the number of candidates in the 2003 gubernatorial recall.

The tax return disclosure requirement did not apply to Newsom, who was not considered a "candidate" in the recall. Newsom's campaign nonetheless submitted his tax documents to Secretary of State Shirley Weber, who refused to publish them on the grounds that the governor was not required to disclose them. Newsom's campaign did not respond to a reporter's July 19, 2021, request for his recent tax returns.

On July 21, 2021, Sacramento County Superior Court Judge Laurie Earl invalidated all tax return disclosure requirements for the 2021 recall election. The ruling was on a suit filed by prospective recall challenger Larry Elder against Secretary of State Weber, alleging she overstepped her authority by disqualifying him from his candidacy due to a purported tax return filing error. The judge ruled that Weber had improperly disqualified Elder, who had "substantially complied" with the requirements and that the special recall election was not a primary election and therefore Senate Bill 27 did not even apply. By then, 42 candidates' tax returns had already been made public by the secretary of state's office. Weber's office said it would comply with the ruling and did not appeal.

==== Constitutional legal challenge ====
In August 2021, an essay by UC Berkeley School of Law Dean Erwin Chemerinsky and UC Berkeley Professor of Law and Economics Aaron Edlin appeared in The New York Times claiming California's recall process violates the Constitution of the United States, since more people could vote to retain Newsom than for any particular candidate while still ousting him, thus potentially violating "one person, one vote" legal precedent (conversely, if a majority of voters favored retaining Newsom, but an even greater number of voters favored a particular replacement candidate, Newsom would nonetheless prevail). Charles C. W. Cooke, writing in The National Review in the same month, criticized the rationale and timing of the essay's publication and said Chemerinsky had selectively taken issue with California's recall, in which a Democrat was targeted, by not bringing up the pivotal 2020–21 United States Senate election in Georgia, which would also be invalid by his logic. Many experts have said the current recall process would probably survive legal challenges.

On August 13, 2021, two California voters filed a federal lawsuit against California's recall process, with formerly disbarred attorney Stephen Yagman and Joseph Reichmann as counsel, alleging violation of the U.S. Constitution's Equal Protection Clause. California Attorney General Rob Bonta said on August 16, 2021, that he was monitoring the lawsuit and legal debate; by then, millions of ballots had already been sent out. On August 27, 2021, United States District Court for the Central District of California Judge Michael W. Fitzgerald, an Obama appointee, dismissed the lawsuit. Judge Fitzgerald, in his ruling, said of the plaintiffs' grievances: "Such disgruntlement raises no federal constitutional issues and certainly does not give the federal judiciary the right to halt the mammoth undertaking of this gubernatorial recall election." The office of Secretary of State Shirley Weber (the defendant in the case) said they would not appeal the ruling.

==== Proposed changes to state recall election law ====
In April 2021, two bills that could make future recalls less likely were introduced in the California Senate: the first, a bill originally authored by Senator Ben Allen (D-Redondo Beach) two years prior, in response to the recall of Senator Josh Newman, would allow a targeted incumbent to be a candidate on the recall ballot; the second, authored by Senator Josh Newman (who by 2020 had reclaimed his lost state senate seat) would have allowed targets of recall campaigns to access the lists of recall petition signers and try to persuade them to remove their signatures. Neither bill would have impacted the 2021 recall election.

Newman's proposed law (Senate Bill 663) cleared the State Senate's Elections Committee on April 12, but he pulled the bill before it headed to the Judiciary Committee after it received fierce opposition from proponents of the 2021 recall over privacy and voter intimidation concerns. As of July 2021, Senator Allen's bill (Senate Constitutional Amendment 3) was on hold in the legislative "suspense file".

In September 2021, while voting in the recall election was underway, Democratic State Assembly Speaker Anthony Rendon said discussions were being held to alter California's recall process; support and opposition to changes in the recall process in California have fallen along partisan lines. Any major changes to the recall process must be approved by California's voters via an amendment to the Constitution of California.

== Fundraising ==
California's recall process requires that campaigns supporting challengers adhere to the usual campaign finance limits for political candidates, while there is no dollar limit for a donor's contribution to the campaign of the defending incumbent, nor for donations to groups advocating narrowly for the recall of the incumbent while not supporting any specific challenger. For the 2021 recall election, the maximum amount that a donor could have given to a candidate (other than Newsom) was $32,400.

By June 2021, the three biggest donors to Newsom's campaign against the recall were the California Association of Realtors, the California Democratic Party, and Reed Hastings. Prominent donors against the recall also included Steven Spielberg, George Soros, Jeffrey Katzenberg, Peter Chernin, J.J. Abrams and Katie McGrath, Laurene Powell Jobs, and Marissa Mayer. By June 3, 2021, labor unions across the state donated $2 million to Newsom's campaign against the recall and union leaders, while saying their side was already favored by voters, promised a get-out-the-vote drive to "make sure we secure those votes and talk to our members to ensure that base" through a door-to-door canvassing effort.

While organizers of the recall campaign said the effort was driven by grassroots supporters angry over pandemic restrictions and Newsom's attendance at the French Laundry dinner that defied his own guidelines, over half of the $4 million raised by recall proponents by March 2021 originated from two dozen Republican groups, along with wealthy companies and individuals, including Douglas Leone, David O. Sacks and Chamath Palihapitiya. Recall proponents said there was greater voter energy in favor of the recall and that despite having a small budget, an "unparalleled" volunteer base collected more than enough signatures for the "purposeful and organic" recall effort.

By May 26, 2021, $11.1 million and $4.6 million went to the pro-Newsom and pro-recall sides, respectively, with most funding for both sides originating from the same wealthy enclaves around the state. On August 4, 2021, the Los Angeles Times published updated campaign finance data for the upcoming recall election: Newsom's campaign was by far in the lead with $51 million raised, while $5.8 million had been raised by pro-recall committees unaffiliated with a candidate (most of the $5.8 million raised had already been spent during the signature gathering phase). Among challengers who had raised over a million dollars, John Cox reported the most, with $7.6 million (largely self-funded), followed by Faulconer, who reported $3.4 million (raised over a six-month period), and Elder, who reported over $1 million (raised over a three-week period).

After surviving the recall election, Newsom would decide the fate of numerous bills passed in the legislature and determine policy that could affect donors to his anti-recall campaign, which included the film and tech industries, real estate and labor union interests, and Native American tribes, who had collectively donated tens of millions of dollars to fight the recall (being unencumbered by donation limits), in what was described as a unique opportunity to attempt to buy influence in California's government.

== Campaign ==
=== Qualified replacement candidates ===
To have been listed on the ballot as a replacement candidate, a candidate must have been a United States citizen and registered to vote in California, submitted signatures from 65 registered voters and paid a $4,194.94 filing fee (which could be waived with the submission of 7,000 signatures of registered voters). Candidates who had been convicted of a felony involving bribery or embezzlement of public money were not allowed to run.

The deadline for filing was July 16, 2021. Forty-six candidates qualified to appear on the recall ballot, consisting of 24 Republicans, nine Democrats, two Greens, one Libertarian, and ten no party preference. Four of the 46 candidates qualified after a Sacramento County judge invalidated application of SB 27 on recall elections and ordered California's Secretary of State to add candidates who did not meet requirements for tax return disclosure. The list of candidates on the ballot was certified on July 21, 2021. Additionally, seven write-in candidates were certified by the secretary of state on September 3. Of the write-in candidates, their party affiliation consisted of two Democrats, one Republican, one American Independent, and three no party preference. Lieutenant Governor of California Eleni Kounalakis declined to run.

==== Top candidates ====
Candidates who received at least 1% of the vote
Candidate	Party	Prior positions	Residence
Holly L. Baade	Democratic	Spiritual teacher and coach	Fairfax
John H. Cox	Republican	Businessman; Perennial candidate 2018 Republican gubernatorial nominee	Rancho Santa Fe
Larry Elder	Republican	Conservative talk show host and author	Los Angeles
Kevin Faulconer	Republican	Former mayor of San Diego (2014–2020)	San Diego
Caitlyn Jenner	Republican	Reality show personality Former Olympic athlete Transgender rights activist	Malibu
Kevin Kiley	Republican	Assemblyman for California's 6th State Assembly district (2016–2022)	Rocklin
Patrick Kilpatrick	Democratic	Actor; Screenwriter; Producer	Los Angeles
Jacqueline; McGowan	Democratic	Cannabis advocate and business owner	Napa
Kevin Paffrath	Democratic	YouTuber; Real estate broker Landlord	Ventura
Armando Perez- Serrato	Democratic	Business owner	Orange
Brandon Ross	Democratic	Doctor and lawyer	San Diego
Joel A. Ventresca	Democratic	Former executive committee member of the Service Employees International Union; Retired airport analyst Perennial candidate	San Francisco
Daniel Watts	Democratic	Free speech lawyer Green candidate in the 2003 California gubernatorial recall election	Vista

=== Debates ===
The Richard Nixon Foundation announced plans for two debates during the month of August 2021: the first on August 4, and the second on August 22. The first debate was a 90-minute televised event held at the Nixon Presidential Library in Yorba Linda, California. Six Republican candidates (Faulconer, Elder, Cox, Jenner, Kiley, and Ose) were invited to participate, along with Newsom. The Nixon Foundation announced that all the Republican candidates, with the exception of Jenner, had accepted the invitation, and Gov. Newsom had not responded. A day after the debate was announced with Elder as a participant, the Elder campaign issued a statement that he would not attend the debate.

During the August 17 debate in Sacramento, Cox was served with a subpoena while on stage, and on camera. The subpoena by a San Diego County court was for failure to pay a debt of about $100,000 from his 2018 gubernatorial campaign. Ose had initially accepted the invitation to appear at the same debate, but dropped out of the race the day of the debate, and therefore did not attend. Elder announced that he would not attend the debate, nor any other debate that Newsom was not attending.

During the August 25 debate in Sacramento, Kevin Paffrath called on the other three candidates onstage (Faulconer, Cox, and Kiley) to drop out of the race and endorse him, stating he feared a lame-duck governor would get nothing done.

2021 California's gubernatorial recall election debates
No.	Date (2021)	Host / sponsor	Moderator(s)	Link
1	July 24	Yes California (virtual format)	Marcus Ruiz Evans & Tom Elias	
2	August 4	Nixon Presidential Library	Hugh Hewitt (with Robert C. O'Brien, Christine Devine and Elex Michaelson serving as panelists)	
3	August 17	Sacramento Press Club	Vicki Gonzalez	
4	August 19	KRON-TV studios, San Francisco	Nikki Laurenzo & Frank Buckley	
5	August 25	KCRA-TV studios, Sacramento	Alexei Koseff & Deirdre Fitzpatrick	

==== Participation ====
Participating candidates in the debates
Candidate	P Present A Absent N Not invited W Withdrawn				
Candidate	Debate number (see table above)				
Candidate	1	2	3	4	5
Larry Elder	A	A	A	A	A
John Cox	A	P	P	P	P
Kevin Faulconer	A	P	P	P	P
Kevin Kiley	A	P	P	P	P
Caitlyn Jenner	A	A	A	A	A
Kevin Paffrath	A	N	N	N	P
Doug Ose	P	P	W	W	W
Jacqueline McGowan	P	N	N	N	N
James G. Hanink	P	N	N	N	N
Holly L. Baade	P	N	N	N	N
David Alexander Bramante	P	N	N	N	N
John R. Drake	P	N	N	N	N
David Hillberg	P	N	N	N	N
Dan Kapelovitz	P	N	N	N	N
Kevin K. Kaul	P	N	N	N	N
Daniel R. Mercuri	P	N	N	N	N
Joel A. Ventresca	P	N	N	N	N
Daniel Watts	P	N	N	N	N

=== Endorsements ===
==== On recall question ====
"Yes" (for recall) (Note: All individuals listed below are Republicans, except the ones labeled with a different party affiliation.)

Executive branch officials

- Richard Grenell, former U.S. ambassador to Germany (2018–2020), former acting director of National Intelligence (2020) and former special presidential envoy for Serbia and Kosovo Peace Negotiations (2019–2021)

Governors

- Mike Huckabee, former governor of Arkansas (1996–2007) and candidate for president of the United States in 2008 and 2016
- Pete Wilson, 36th governor of California (1991–1999), United States senator from California (1983–1991), and 29th mayor of San Diego (1971–1983)

U.S representatives

- Ken Calvert, U.S. representative from California's 42nd congressional district (2023–present), California's 41st congressional district (2013–2023), California's 44th congressional district (2003–2023) and California's 43rd congressional district (1993–2003)
- Dan Crenshaw, U.S. representative from Texas's 2nd congressional district (2019–present)
- Mike Garcia, U.S. representative from California's 25th congressional district (2020–2023) and California's 27th congressional district (2023–present)
- Newt Gingrich, former U.S. representative from Georgia's 6th congressional district (1979–1999), 50th speaker of the United States House of Representatives (1995–1999), and candidate for President of the United States in 2012
- Darrell Issa, U.S. representative from and California's 48th congressional district (2023–present), California's 50th congressional district (2021–2023), California's 49th congressional district (2003–2019), and California's 48th congressional district (2001–2003); former director of the USTDA (2019–2021)
- Young Kim, U.S. representative from California's 39th congressional district (2021–2023) and California's 40th congressional district (2023–present)
- Doug LaMalfa, U.S. representative from California's 1st congressional district (2013–present)
- Kevin McCarthy, U.S. representative from California's 23rd congressional district (2007–2023), California's 20th congressional district (2023) and House minority leader (2019–present)
- Tom McClintock, U.S. representative from California's 4th congressional district (2009–2023), California's 5th congressional district (2023–present) and candidate for governor in the 2003 recall election
- Devin Nunes, U.S. representative from California's 22nd congressional district (2003–2022)
- Jay Obernolte, U.S. representative from California's 8th congressional district (2021–present)
- Doug Ose, former U.S. representative for California's 3rd congressional district (1999–2005) and candidate for governor in 2018 and 2021
- Burgess Owens, U.S. representative for Utah's 4th congressional district (2021–present)
- Michelle Steel, U.S. representative from California's 48th congressional district (2021–2023) and California's 45th congressional district (2023–present)
- David Valadao, U.S. representative from California's 21st congressional district (2013–2019; 2021–2023) and California's 22nd congressional district (2023–present)

State legislators

- Laurie Davies, state assemblymember from the 73rd district (2020–present)
- Shannon Grove, state senator from the 16th district (2018–present) and former Republican minority leader of the California Senate (2019–2021)
- Dov Hikind, former state assemblymember from New York's 48th Assembly District (1983–2018) (Democrat)
- Gloria Romero, former state senator from the 24th district (2001–2009) and former Democratic majority leader of the California Senate (2001–2008) (Democrat)

Local officials

- Joel Anderson, member of the San Diego County Board of Supervisors (2021–present) and former state senator from the 38th district (2010–2018)
- Clint Eastwood, former mayor of Carmel-by-the-Sea (1986–1988), actor, film director, composer, and producer (Libertarian)
- Mike Feinstein, former mayor of Santa Monica (2000–2002) and candidate for California secretary of state in 2018 (Green)

Individuals

- Rudy Giuliani, former mayor of New York City (1994–2001) and former U.S. associate attorney general (1981–1983)
- Rose McGowan, activist and former actress
- David O. Sacks, technology industry executive
- Kat Von D, tattoo artist and television personality

Organizations

- California Republican Party
- Howard Jarvis Taxpayers Association
- Libertarian Party of California

Newspapers and other media

- The Bakersfield Californian Editorial Board
- Southern California News Group (Note: Southern California News Group has a single central editorial board for all of its newspapers, which include Daily Breeze, Inland Valley Daily Bulletin, Press-Telegram, Los Angeles Daily News, Orange County Register, Pasadena Star-News, Redlands Daily Facts, The Press-Enterprise, The San Bernardino Sun, San Gabriel Valley Tribune, and Whittier Daily News.)
"No" (against recall) (Note: All individuals listed below are Democrats, except the ones labeled with a different party affiliation.)

Executive branch officials

- Joe Biden, 46th president of the United States (2021–2025), 47th vice president of the United States (2009–2017) and former U.S. senator from Delaware (1973–2009)
- Kamala Harris, 49th vice president of the United States (2021–2025) former California attorney general (2011–2017) and former U.S. senator from California (2017–2021)
- Barack Obama, 44th president of the United States (2009–2017) and former U.S. senator from Illinois (2005–2008)

U.S. senators

- Cory Booker, United States senator from New Jersey (2013–present) and candidate for president of the United States in 2020
- Barbara Boxer, former U.S. senator from California (1993–2017)
- Amy Klobuchar, U.S. senator from Minnesota (2007–present) and candidate for president of the United States in 2020
- Alex Padilla, U.S. senator from California (2021–present) and former California secretary of state (2015–2021)
- Bernie Sanders, U.S. senator from Vermont (2007–present) and candidate for president of the United States in 2016 and 2020 (Independent)
- Chuck Schumer, U.S. senator from New York (1999–present) and Senate majority leader (2021–present)
- Elizabeth Warren, U.S. senator from Massachusetts (2013–present) and candidate for president of the United States in 2020

U.S representatives

- Karen Bass, United States representative from California's 37th congressional district (2013–2022)
- Julia Brownley, U.S. representative from California's 26th congressional district (2013–present)
- John Burton, former U.S. representative from California's 5th congressional district (1975–1983)
- Salud Carbajal, U.S. representative from California's 24th congressional district (2017–present)
- Judy Chu, U.S. representative from California's 28th congressional district (2023–present), California's 27th congressional district (2013–2023) and California's 32nd congressional district (2009–2013)
- Mark DeSaulnier, U.S. representative from California's 10th congressional district (2023–present) and California's 11th congressional district (2015–2023)
- Sara Jacobs, U.S. representative from California's 51st congressional district (2023–present) and California's 53rd congressional district (2021–2023)
- Ro Khanna, U.S. representative from California's 17th congressional district (2017–present)
- Barbara Lee, U.S. representative from California's 12th congressional district (2023–2025), California's 13th congressional district (2013–2023) and California's 9th congressional district (1998–2013)
- Ted Lieu, U.S. representative from California's 33rd congressional district (2015–present)
- Zoe Lofgren, U.S. representative from California's 18th congressional district (2023–present), California's 19th congressional district (2013–2023) and California's 16th congressional district (1995–2013)
- Alan Lowenthal, U.S. representative from California's 42nd congressional district (2023) and California's 47th congressional district (2013–2023)
- Doris Matsui, U.S. representative from California's 7th congressional district (2023–present), California's 6th congressional district (2013–2023) and California's 5th congressional district (2005–2013)
- Alexandria Ocasio-Cortez, U.S. representative from New York's 14th congressional district (2019–present)
- Nancy Pelosi, U.S. representative from California's 12th congressional district (1987–present) and 52nd speaker of the United States House of Representatives (2007–2011; 2019–2023)
- Katie Porter, U.S. representative from California's 47th congressional district (2023–2025) and California's 45th congressional district (2019–2023)
- Raul Ruiz, U.S. representative from California's 36th congressional district (2013–2023) and California's 25th congressional district (2023–present)
- Adam Schiff, U.S. representative from California's 30th congressional district (2023–2025), California's 28th congressional district (2013–2023), California's 29th congressional district (2003–2013) and California's 27th congressional district (2001–2003)
- Jackie Speier, U.S. representative from California's 14th congressional district (2013–2023) and California's 12th congressional district (2008–2013)
- Maxine Waters, U.S. representative from California's 43rd congressional district (2013–present) and California's 35th congressional district (1993–2013)

State officeholders

- Stacey Abrams, former minority leader of the Georgia House of Representatives (2011–2017), Democratic nominee for governor of Georgia in 2018, and founder of Fair Fight Action
- Rob Bonta, California attorney general (2021–present) and former state assemblymember from the 18th district (2012–2021)
- Jerry Brown, former governor of California (1975–1983; 2011–2019)
- Wendy Carrillo, state assemblymember from the 51st district (2017–2024)
- David Chiu, state assemblymember from the 17th district (2014–present) and former president of the San Francisco Board of Supervisors (2009–2014)
- Bill Dodd, state senator from the 3rd district (2016–2024)
- María Elena Durazo, state senator from the 24th district (2018–present)
- Laura Friedman, state assemblymember from the 43rd district (2016–2024)
- Lorena Gonzalez, state assemblymember from the 80th district (2013–2022)
- Hannah-Beth Jackson, former state senator from the 19th district (2012–2020)
- Sydney Kamlager-Dove, state senator from the 30th district (2021–2022)
- Eleni Kounalakis, lieutenant governor of California (2019–present) and former United States ambassador to Hungary (2010–2013)
- Ricardo Lara, California Insurance Commissioner (2019–present)
- Fiona Ma, California state treasurer (2019–present), former member of the California Board of Equalization (2015–2019), and former state assemblymember from the 12th district (2006–2012)
- Richard Pan, state senator from the 6th district (2014–2022)
- Fran Pavley, former state senator from the 27th district (2008–2016)
- Robert Rivas, state assemblymember from the 30th district (2018–present)
- Rudy Salas, state assemblymember from the 32nd district (2012–2022)
- Nancy Skinner, state senator from the 9th district (2016–2024)
- Tony Thurmond, California state superintendent of public instruction (2019–present)
- Betty Yee, California state controller (2015–2023) and former member of the California Board of Equalization (2004–2015)

Local officials

- London Breed, mayor of San Francisco (2017–2018 (acting); 2018–2025)
- Robert Garcia, mayor of Long Beach (2014–2022)
- Todd Gloria, mayor of San Diego (2020–present; 2013–2014 (acting)) and former state assemblymember from the 78th district (2016–2020)
- Sam Liccardo, U.S. representative from California's 16th congressional district (2025–present) and mayor of San Jose (2015–2023)
- Libby Schaaf, mayor of Oakland (2015–2023)
- Antonio Villaraigosa, former mayor of Los Angeles (2005–2013), former speaker of the California State Assembly (1998–2000), and 2018 gubernatorial candidate

Individuals

- Byron Allen, entertainment industry executive
- Mary Carey, adult film actress and candidate for governor of California in the 2003 recall election
- Jaime Harrison, chair of the DNC
- Alan F. Horn, entertainment industry executive
- George Lopez, actor and comedian
- Alyssa Milano, actress and activist
- Michael Moore, author, film documentary and activist
- Paula Poundstone, actress, author, and comedian
- Rob Reiner, actor, filmmaker, and activist
- Ann Sarnoff, television executive
- George Takei, actor and activist
- Elijah Wood, actor and producer

Newspapers and other media

- Bay Area Reporter Editorial Board
- Los Angeles Times Editorial Board
- McClatchy California Editorial Boards (Note: McClatchy issued a joint endorsement by the editorial boards for its California newspapers, which include The Sacramento Bee, The Fresno Bee, Merced Sun-Star, The Modesto Bee, and The San Luis Obispo Tribune.)
- The Mercury News and East Bay Times Editorial Boards
- Monterey County Weekly Editorial Board
- Napa Valley Register Editorial Board
- The New York Times Editorial Board
- The San Diego Union-Tribune Editorial Board
- San Francisco Chronicle Editorial Board
- Santa Barbara Independent Editorial Board

Organizations

- American Civil Liberties Union California Action
- Armenian National Committee of America – Western Region
- California Democratic Party
- California Faculty Association
- California Federation of Teachers
- California League of Conservation Voters
- Climate Hawks Vote
- Democratic Governors Association
- Democratic Socialists of America Los Angeles Electoral Committee
- Equality California
- Green Party of California
- Human Rights Campaign
- International Association of Fire Fighters
- Jewish Democratic Council of America
- NARAL Pro-Choice California
- National Union of Healthcare Workers
- Peace and Freedom Party
- Planned Parenthood Affiliates of California
- Service Employees International Union California
- Socialist Equality Party
- United Food and Commercial Workers
- Valley Industry & Commerce Association

==== For candidates ====
Larry Elder (R)

Governors

- Pete Wilson, 36th governor of California (1991–1999), former U.S. senator from California (1983–1991), and 29th mayor of San Diego (1971–1983)

U.S. representatives

- Dan Crenshaw, U.S. representative from Texas's 2nd congressional district (2019–present)
- Burgess Owens, U.S. representative from Utah's 4th congressional district (2021–present)
- Michelle Steel, U.S. representative from California's 45th congressional district (2023–present) and California's 48th congressional district (2021–2023), former member of the Orange County Board of Supervisors (2015–2021), and former member of the California State Board of Equalization (2007–2015)

State legislators

- Laurie Davies, state assemblymember from the 73rd district (2020–present)
- Shannon Grove, state senator from the 16th district (2018–present) and former minority leader of the California Senate (2019–2021)
- Dov Hikind, former state assemblymember from New York's 48th Assembly District (1983–2018) (Democrat)
- Gloria Romero, former state senator from the 24th district (2001–2009) and former Democratic majority leader of the California Senate (2001–2008)

Local officials

- Clint Eastwood, former mayor of Carmel-by-the-Sea (1986–1988), actor, film director, composer, and producer
- Rudy Giuliani, former mayor of New York City (1994–2001) and former U.S. associate attorney general (1981–1983)

Individuals

- Hugh Hewitt, radio talk show host
- Rose McGowan, former actress and activist
- Chuck Norris, martial artist, actor, film producer, and screenwriter
- Mike Piazza, former professional baseball player

Organizations

- American Independent Party
- California College Republicans
- California Rifle and Pistol Association (Note: The California Rifle and Pistol Association is the official California branch of the National Rifle Association of America.)
- New York Young Republican Club

Newspapers and other media

- The Santa Clarita Valley Signal
- Southern California News Group
Kevin Faulconer (R)

U.S. representatives

- Darrell Issa, U.S. representative from California's 48th congressional district (2023–present), California's 50th congressional district (2021–2023), California's 49th congressional district (2003–2019), and California's 48th congressional district (2001–2003); former director of the USTDA (2019–2021)

State legislators

- Patricia Bates, state senator from the 36th district (2014–present) and former minority leader of the California Senate (2017–2019) (Note: The press release announcing the endorsement was made before the recall was announced, so the press release only references the 2022 campaign for governor. The endorsements have been reported, with less details, in mainstream media outlets.)
- Frank Bigelow, state assemblymember from the 5th district (2012–present)
- Jordan Cunningham, state assemblymember from the 35th district (2016–present)
- Megan Dahle, state assemblymember from the 1st district (2019–present)
- Heath Flora, state assemblymember from the 12th district (2016–present)
- Brian Jones, state senator from the 38th district (2018–present)
- Tom Lackey, state assemblymember from the 36th district (2014–present)
- Devon Mathis, state assemblymember from the 26th district (2014–present)
- Melissa Melendez, state senator from the 28th district (2020–present)
- Janet Nguyen, state assemblymember from the 72nd district (2020–present)
- Jim Nielsen, state senator from the 4th district (2013–present)
- Thurston Smith, state assemblymember from the 33rd district (2020–present)
- Randy Voepel, state assemblymember from the 71st district (2016–present)
- Marie Waldron, state assemblymember from the 75th district (2012–present) and minority leader of the California Assembly (2018–present)
- Scott Wilk, state senator from the 21st district (2016–present) and minority leader of the California Senate (2021–present)

Individuals

- Michael Shellenberger, author and 2018 gubernatorial candidate

Newspapers and other media

- The Bakersfield Californian Editorial Board
- Los Angeles Times Editorial Board (Note: Endorser also gave a "no" endorsement on the recall question)
James Hanink (ASP, but listed on the ballot as "no party preference")

Individuals

- Brian Carroll, teacher and 2020 ASP presidential nominee

Organizations

- American Solidarity Party
Jeff Hewitt (L)

Organizations

- Libertarian Party of California
Dan Kapelovitz (G)

Local officials

- Mike Feinstein, former mayor of Santa Monica (2000–2002) and candidate for California secretary of state in 2018

Organizations

- Green Party of California
Kevin Kiley (R)

U.S. representatives

- Doug Ose, former U.S. representative for California's 3rd congressional district (1999–2005), candidate for governor in 2018 and 2021

Local officials

- Joel Anderson, member of the San Diego County Board of Supervisors (2021–present) and former state senator from the 38th district (2010–2018)

Individuals

- Orrin Heatlie, main recall organizer and retired county sheriff's sergeant (Note: As a political organizer, Heatlie directed the successful effort to collect recall petition signatures from voters, which ultimately led to the recall election.)

Newspapers and other media

- RedState, conservative blog
Michael Loebs (CNP, but listed on the ballot as "no party preference")

Organizations

- California National Party
David Moore (SEP, but listed on the ballot as "no party preference")

Organizations

- Socialist Equality Party
Dennis Richter (SWP, but listed on the ballot as "no party preference")

Individuals

- Alyson Kennedy, mineworker and SWP nominee for president in 2016 and 2020

Organizations

- Socialist Workers Party

=== Predictions ===
Source	Ranking	As of
The Cook Political Report	Likely D	September 13, 2021
Inside Elections	Likely D	August 16, 2021
Sabato's Crystal Ball	Likely D	September 9, 2021

=== Polling ===
==== Newsom recall ====
Aggregate polls

Source of poll aggregation	Dates administered	Dates updated	Yes on recall	No on recall	Undecided	Margin
Real Clear Politics	September 6–13, 2021	September 14, 2021	41.8%	56.3%	1.9%	No on recall +14.5
FiveThirtyEight	August 27 – September 14, 2021	September 14, 2021	41.5%	57.3%	1.2%	No on recall +15.8
Average			41.7%	56.8%	1.5%	No on recall +15.1
Result			38.12%	61.88%	–	No on recall +23.76

Graphical summary

View source data.

Poll source	Date(s) administered	Sample size (Note: Key: A – all adults RV – registered voters LV – likely voters V – unclear)	Margin of error	Yes on recall	No on recall	Undecided
The Trafalgar Group (R)	September 11–13, 2021	1,082 (LV)	± 3.0%	45%	53%	2%
Momentive	August 31 – September 13, 2021	3,985 (LV)	± 1.6%	41%	55%	4%
Emerson College	September 10–11, 2021	1,000 (LV)	± 3.0%	40%	60%	1%
Data for Progress (D)	September 2–10, 2021	2,464 (LV)	± 2.0%	43%	57%	–
SurveyUSA	September 7–8, 2021	930 (LV)	± 4.2%	41%	54%	5%
Suffolk University	September 6–7, 2021	500 (LV)	± 4.4%	41%	58%	1%
Berkeley IGS	August 30 – September 6, 2021	7,917 (LV)	± 2.0%	38%	60%	1%
The Trafalgar Group (R)	September 2–4, 2021	1,079 (LV)	± 3.0%	43%	53%	4%
YouGov	August 30 – September 1, 2021	1,618 (LV)	± 3.0%	43%	57%	–
The Trafalgar Group (R)	August 26–29, 2021	1,088 (LV)	± 3.0%	44%	52%	4%
Public Policy Institute of California	August 20–29, 2021	1,080 (LV)	± 4.5%	39%	58%	3%
SurveyUSA	August 26–28, 2021	816 (LV)	± 4.4%	43%	51%	6%
Gravis Marketing	August 25–27, 2021	729 (LV)	± 3.6%	45%	50%	5%
Targoz Market Research	August 23–25, 2021	787 (LV)	± 3.5%	42%	52%	6%
Change Research (D)	August 22–25, 2021	782 (LV)	± 3.7%	42%	57%	1%
Redfield & Wilton Strategies	August 20–22, 2021	1,000 (RV)	± 3.1%	41%	48%	11% (Note: Includes "won't vote" with 3%)
Redfield & Wilton Strategies	August 20–22, 2021	964 (LV)	± 3.2%	43%	51%	7%
YouGov	August 6–12, 2021	1,585 (RV)	± 3.4%	46%	54%	–
YouGov	August 6–12, 2021	1,534 (LV)	± 3.8%	48%	52%	–
SurveyUSA	August 2–4, 2021	613 (LV)	± 5.0%	51%	40%	9%
Emerson College	July 30 – August 1, 2021	1,000 (LV)	± 3.0%	46%	48%	6%
Core Decision Analytics	July 27–29, 2021	804 (RV)	± 3.5%	41%	52%	7%
Core Decision Analytics	July 27–29, 2021	~728 (LV)	± 3.6%	44%	51%	5%
Berkeley IGS	July 18–24, 2021	5,795 (RV)	± 2.0%	36%	51%	13%
Berkeley IGS	July 18–24, 2021	3,266 (LV)	± 2.5%	47%	50%	3%
Emerson College	July 19–20, 2021	1,085 (RV)	± 2.9%	43%	48%	9%
Change Research (D)	June 11–16, 2021	1,085 (RV)	± 3.0%	40%	54%	6%
Moore Information Group (R) (Note: Poll conducted for Cox's campaign)	June 1–3, 2021	800 (RV)	± 3.0%	44%	50%	6%
Moore Information Group (R)	June 1–3, 2021	682 (LV)	± 4.0%	49%	46%	5%
Tulchin Research (D)	May 21–30, 2021	1,500 (RV)	± 2.5%	37%	50%	13%
Tulchin Research (D)	May 21–30, 2021	1,168 (LV)	± 2.9%	38%	52%	9%
Public Policy Institute of California	May 9–18, 2021	1,074 (LV)	± 4.2%	40%	57%	3%
Berkeley IGS	April 29 – May 5, 2021	10,289 (RV)	± 2.0%	36%	49%	15%
Berkeley IGS	April 29 – May 5, 2021	7,943 (LV)	± 2.3%	42%	50%	8%
SurveyUSA	April 30 – May 2, 2021	642 (RV)	± 5.3%	36%	47%	17%
McLaughlin & Associates (R) (Note: Poll conducted for the California Republican Party)	April 15–19, 2021	1,000 (LV)	± 3.1%	45%	45%	10%
Public Policy Institute of California	March 14–23, 2021	1,174 (LV)	± 3.9%	40%	56%	5%
Probolsky Research (R)	March 16–19, 2021	900 (RV)	± 3.3%	40%	46%	14%
Probolsky Research (R)	March 16–19, 2021	900 (LV) (Note: Weighted by vote propensity)	± 3.3%	35%	53%	13%
Emerson College	March 12–14, 2021	1,045 (RV)	± 3.0%	38%	42%	20% (Note: Includes "would not vote" with 6%)
WPA Intelligence (R) (Note: Poll conducted for Faulconer's campaign)	February 12–14, 2021	645 (LV)	± 3.9%	47%	43%	10%
Berkeley IGS	January 23–29, 2021	10,357 (RV)	± 2.0%	36%	45%	20%
Berkeley IGS	January 23–29, 2021	7,980 (LV)	± 2.4%	36%	49%	15%
Remington Research (R) (Note: Poll conducted for Reform California)	March 17–18, 2019	1,303 (LV)	± 2.7%	31%	52%	17%

==== Replacement candidates ====
The table below contains all candidates who had polled at or above 2% since the filing deadline for the recall, had raised at least $100,000 (excluding loans and including at least $5,000 in the most recent filing period), were a current or former elected official, or were otherwise considered notable in their own right. The graphical summary includes all candidates who met at least one of those criteria and had appeared in at least four separate publicly released polls.

Aggregate polls

Source of poll aggregation	Dates administered	Dates updated	Elder (R)	Paffrath (D)	Faulconer (R)	Cox (R)	Kiley (R)	Jenner (R)	Other/Undecided (Note: Calculated by taking the difference of 100% and all other candidates combined.)	Margin
Real Clear Politics	August 20 – Sep 13, 2021	Sep 13, 2021	32.4%	7.8%	5.3%	4.0%	3.1%	1.3%	46.1%	Elder +24.6
FiveThirtyEight	July 18 – Sep 13, 2021	Sep 13, 2021	29.7%	6.1%	5.1%	4.5%	3.0%	1.0%	50.6%	Elder +23.6
Average			31.1%	7.0%	5.2%	4.3%	3.1%	1.2%	48.4%	Elder +24.1
Result			48.4%	9.6%	8.0%	4.1%	3.5%	1.0%	25.4%	Elder +38.8

Graphical summary

View source data.

Replacement candidate opinion polling for the 2021 California gubernatorial recall election
Poll source	Date(s) administered	Sample size	Margin of error	(I) Angelyne	(D) Holly Baade	(R) John Cox	(D) John Drake	(R) Larry Elder	(R) Kevin Faulconer	(R) Ted Gaines	(L) Jeff Hewitt	(R) Caitlyn Jenner	(G) Dan Kapelovitz	(R) Kevin Kiley	(D) Patrick Kilpatrick	(D) Jacqueline McGowan	(R) Doug Ose	(D) Kevin Paffrath	(D) Armando Perez-Serrato	(D) Brandon Ross	(D) Joel Ventresca	(D) Daniel Watts	Other	Undecided	None
2021 CA gubernatorial election	Sep 14, 2021	7,361,568	–	0.5%	1.3%	4.1%	0.9%	48.4%	8.0%	0.7%	0.7%	1.0%	0.9%	3.5%	1.2%	2.9%	0.4%	9.6%	1.2%	5.3%	2.5%	2.3%	4.6%	–	–
The Trafalgar Group (R)	Sep 11–13, 2021	1,082 (LV)	± 3.0%	–	–	3%	1%	41%	4%	–	–	1%	–	4%	–	4%	–	10%	–	1%	–	–	9%	23%	–
Emerson College	Sep 10–11, 2021	1,000 (LV)	± 3.0%	–	–	3%	6%	30%	4%	–	–	2%	–	4%	–	3%	1%	6%	–	–	–	–	3%	6%	34%
Data for Progress (D)	Sep 2–10, 2021	2,557 (LV)	± 2.0%	–	2%	7%	–	22%	4%	–	–	1%	–	3%	–	4%	–	6%	–	5%	–	3%	5%	7%	29%
SurveyUSA	Sep 7–8, 2021	597 (LV)	± 5.5%	–	4%	8%	4%	29%	6%	–	–	2%	–	3%	2%	4%	–	9%	1%	3%	2%	2%	6%	13%	–
Suffolk University	Sep 6–7, 2021	233 (LV)	± 6.4%	0%	0%	4%	1%	39%	5%	1%	1%	1%	0%	2%	–	2%	0%	5%	0%	2%	1%	–	–	7%	–
Berkeley IGS	Aug 30 – Sep 6, 2021	4,707 (LV)	± 2.6%	–	1%	4%	1%	38%	8%	–	1%	1%	1%	4%	1%	2%	–	10%	1%	3%	2%	1%	8%	16%	–
The Trafalgar Group (R)	Sep 2–4, 2021	1,079 (LV)	± 3.0%	–	–	3%	–	32%	4%	–	–	1%	–	4%	–	3%	–	13%	–	–	–	–	11%	29%	–
YouGov	Aug 30 – Sep 1, 2021	1,618 (LV)	± 3.0%	1%	1%	3%	1%	24%	5%	0%	1%	1%	1%	2%	1%	2%	1%	7%	1%	1%	1%	1%	4% (Note: Stoner, Loebs, Trimino, and Moore with 1%; Lozano, Collins, Newman, Lodge, Richter, Martinez, Gallucci, Symmon, Furin, Le Roux, Stephens, Hillberg, Kaul, Hanink, Papagan, Marciniak, Lucey, Killens, Wildstar, Singh, Zacky, Bramante, and Mercuri with 0%)	–	39%
The Trafalgar Group (R)	Aug 26–29, 2021	1,088 (LV)	± 3.0%	–	–	4%	–	29%	4%	–	–	1%	–	–	–	–	0%	22%	–	–	–	–	9%	30%	–
Public Policy Institute of California	Aug 20–29, 2021	1,080 (LV)	± 4.5%	–	–	3%	–	26%	5%	–	–	1%	–	3%	–	–	–	–	–	–	–	–	14%	24%	25%
SurveyUSA	Aug 26–28, 2021	515 (LV)	± 5.2%	–	5%	6%	2%	27%	5%	–	–	2%	–	5%	–	5%	–	6%	3%	5%	2%	–	12%	14%	–
Gravis Marketing	Aug 25–27, 2021	729 (LV)	± 3.6%	–	–	4%	–	22%	6%	1%	2%	3%	3%	4%	–	–	–	18%	–	–	–	–	16%	21%	–
Targoz Market Research	Aug 23–25, 2021	787 (LV)	± 3.5%	–	–	13%	–	12%	7%	–	–	3%	–	3%	–	–	2%	13%	–	–	–	–	4%	20%	23%
Change Research (D)	Aug 22–25, 2021	782 (LV)	± 3.7%	–	2%	2%	–	27%	3%	–	–	1%	–	4%	–	5%	1%	6%	–	3%	–	3%	7%	15%	22%
YouGov	Aug 6–12, 2021	1,534 (LV)	± 3.8%	–	–	3%	–	23%	3%	2%	1%	2%	–	3%	–	–	2%	13%	–	–	–	–	5%	25%	20%
SurveyUSA	Aug 2–4, 2021	545 (LV)	± 5.4%	–	–	10%	–	23%	5%	–	–	4%	–	3%	–	–	4%	27%	–	–	–	–	5%	20%	–
Emerson College	Jul 30 – Aug 1, 2021	1,000 (LV)	± 3.0%	–	–	7%	–	23%	4%	–	–	7%	–	5%	–	–	0%	1%	–	–	–	–	14%	40%	–
Core Decision Analytics	Jul 27–29, 2021	803 (RV)	± 3.5%	1%	1%	4%	0%	9%	3%	1%	1%	1%	1%	2%	1%	3%	1%	2%	1%	2%	0%	1%	9% (Note: Bramante, Gallucci, Lodge, Lozano, Lucey, Marciniak, Stoner, Trimino, and Wildstar with 1%; Collins, Furin, Hanink, Hillberg, Kaul, Killens, Le Roux, Loebs, Martinez, Mercuri, Moore, Newman, Papagan, Richter, Singh, Stephens, Symmon, and Zacky with 0%)	34%	22%
Core Decision Analytics	Jul 27–29, 2021	~728 (LV)	± 3.6%	1%	1%	4%	0%	10%	3%	1%	1%	1%	1%	2%	1%	3%	1%	3%	1%	2%	0%	1%	8% (Note: Bramante, Lodge, Lozano, Lucey, Marciniak, Stoner, Trimino, and Wildstar with 1%; Collins, Furin, Gallucci, Hanink, Hillberg, Kaul, Killens, Le Roux, Loebs, Martinez, Mercuri, Moore, Newman, Papagan, Richter, Singh, Stephens, Symmon, and Zacky with 0%)	32%	22%
Berkeley IGS	Jul 18–24, 2021	5,795 (RV)	± 2.0%	1%	2%	7%	1%	12%	8%	0%	1%	2%	1%	3%	0%	2%	1%	5%	–	2%	1%	2%	1% (Note: Singh with 1%; Collins, Gallucci, Hanink, Loebs, Mercuri, Moore, Lodge, Lozano, Lucey, Bramante, Leroux, Martinez, Stoner, Newman, Richter, Stephens, Trimino, Zacky, Killens, and Wildstar with 0%)	44%	–
Berkeley IGS	Jul 18–24, 2021	3,266 (LV)	± 2.5%	0%	1%	10%	1%	18%	10%	0%	1%	3%	1%	5%	0%	1%	1%	3%	–	1%	0%	2%	1% (Note: Singh with 1%; Gallucci, Collins, Lodge, Mercuri, Hanink, Moore, Richter, Killens, Leroux, Loebs, Martinez, and Trimino with 0%)	40%	–
Emerson College	Jul 19–20, 2021	1,085 (RV)	± 2.9%	–	–	6%	–	16%	6%	–	–	4%	–	4%	–	–	0%	2%	–	–	–	–	8%	53%	–
Moore Information Group (R)	Jun 1–3, 2021	800 (RV)	± 3.0%	–	–	22%	–	–	11%	–	–	6%	–	–	–	–	4%	–	–	–	–	–	18%	39%	–
Moore Information Group (R)	Jun 1–3, 2021	682 (LV)	± 4.0%	–	–	24%	–	–	12%	–	–	6%	–	–	–	–	4%	–	–	–	–	–	17%	37%	–
SurveyUSA	Apr 30 – May 2, 2021	642 (RV)	± 5.3%	–	–	9%	–	–	3%	–	–	5%	–	–	–	–	2%	–	–	–	–	–	17% (Note: Grenell with 5%; Cernovich, Mercuri, Moorlach, and Williams with 3%)	26%	38%

Hypothetical polling

Full-field ballot including potential Democratic candidates
Poll source	Date(s) administered	Sample size	Margin of error	John Cox (R)	Kevin de León (D)	Kevin Faulconer (R)	Caitlyn Jenner (R)	Doug Ose (R)	Tom Steyer (D)	Antonio Villaraigosa (D)	Other	Undecided
Moore Information Group (R)	Jun 1–3, 2021	800 (RV)	± 3.0%	16%	4%	7%	4%	2%	5%	9%	14%	38%
Moore Information Group (R)	Jun 1–3, 2021	682 (LV)	± 4.0%	18%	4%	8%	4%	2%	5%	8%	13%	37%

Antonio Villaraigosa vs. Kevin Faulconer
Poll source	Date(s) administered	Sample size	Margin of error	Antonio Villaraigosa (D)	Kevin Faulconer (R)	Undecided
WPA Intelligence (R)	Feb 12–14, 2021	645 (LV)	± 3.9%	28%	31%	41%

== Results ==
The recall election result was officially certified on October 22, 2021. Newsom had survived the recall with similar results as his first run for governor. No on recall votes exceeded that of what the votes Newsom received in 2018 by 200,000 votes and had a similar vote percentage as well. No on recall had also won nearly all counties that Newsom had, except for Merced County which voted for the recall by 4 points.

Substantially fewer voters voted on the second question regarding replacement candidates than had voted on the first question regarding whether Newsom should be recalled.

2021 California gubernatorial recall election (question 1)
Choice	Votes	%
No on recall	7,944,092	61.88
Yes on recall	4,894,473	38.12
Blank and invalid votes	54,013	–
Total votes	12,892,578	100
Registered voters and turnout	22,057,154	58.45%

Replacement ballot results by county Elder: 20–30%; 30–40%; 40–50%; 50–60%; 60–70%; Paffrath: 20–30%

2021 California gubernatorial recall election (question 2)
Party	Candidate	Votes	%
Republican	Larry Elder	3,563,867	48.41
Democratic	Kevin Paffrath	706,778	9.60
Republican	Kevin Faulconer	590,346	8.02
Democratic	Brandon M. Ross	392,029	5.33
Republican	John Cox	305,095	4.14
Republican	Kevin Kiley	255,490	3.47
Democratic	Jacqueline McGowan	214,242	2.91
Democratic	Joel Ventresca	186,345	2.53
Democratic	Daniel Watts	167,355	2.27
Democratic	Holly L. Baade	92,218	1.25
Democratic	Patrick Kilpatrick	86,617	1.18
Democratic	Armando "Mando" Perez-Serrato	85,061	1.16
Republican	Caitlyn Jenner	75,215	1.02
Democratic	John R. Drake	68,545	0.93
Green	Dan Kapelovitz	64,375	0.88
Libertarian	Jeff Hewitt	50,378	0.68
Republican	Ted Gaines	47,937	0.65
No party preference	Angelyne	35,900	0.49
No party preference	David Moore (Note: Moore was listed on the ballot as a "no party preference" because the Socialist Equality Party did not have ballot access in the State of California at the time the ballot was printed.)	31,224	0.42
Republican	Anthony Trimino	28,101	0.38
Republican	Doug Ose	26,204	0.36
No party preference	Michael Loebs (Note: Loebs was listed on the ballot as a "no party preference" because the California National Party did not have ballot access in the State of California at the time the ballot was printed.)	25,468	0.35
Green	Heather Collins	24,260	0.33
No party preference	Major Singh	21,394	0.29
Republican	David Lozano	19,945	0.27
Republican	Denver Stoner	19,588	0.27
Republican	Sam Gallucci	18,134	0.25
Republican	Steve Chavez Lodge	17,435	0.24
Republican	Jenny Rae Le Roux	16,032	0.22
Republican	David Alexander Bramante	11,501	0.16
Republican	Diego Martinez	10,860	0.15
Republican	Robert C. Newman II	10,602	0.14
Republican	Sarah Stephens	10,583	0.14
No party preference	Dennis Richter (Note: Richter was listed on the ballot as a "no party preference" because the Socialist Workers Party did not have ballot access in the State of California at the time the ballot was printed.)	10,468	0.14
Republican	Major Williams (write-in)	8,965	0.12
No party preference	Denis Lucey	8,182	0.11
No party preference	James G. Hanink (Note: Hanink was listed on the ballot as "no party preference" and listed in the official Voter Information Guide as "no qualified party preference" because the party with which Hanink was registered, the American Solidarity Party, did not have ballot access at the time the ballot was printed. The party is attempting to qualify for ballot access in time for the 2022 California primaries.)	7,193	0.10
Republican	Daniel Mercuri	7,110	0.10
Republican	Chauncey "Slim" Killens	6,879	0.09
Republican	Leo S. Zacky	6,099	0.08
No party preference	Kevin Kaul	5,600	0.08
Republican	David Hillberg	4,435	0.06
No party preference	Adam Papagan	4,021	0.06
Republican	Rhonda Furin	3,964	0.05
Republican	Nickolas Wildstar	3,811	0.05
No party preference	Jeremiah "Jeremy" Marciniak	2,894	0.04
Republican	Joe M. Symmon	2,397	0.03
No party preference	Miki Habryn (write-in)	137	<0.01
Democratic	Roxanne (write-in)	116	<0.01
Democratic	Stacy Smith (write-in)	81	<0.01
No party preference	Vivek B. Mohan (write-in)	68	<0.01
American Independent	Thuy E. Hugens (write-in)	19	<0.01
No party preference	Vince Lundgren (write-in)	5	<0.01
Total valid votes		7,361,568	100.00
Invalid or blank votes		5,531,010	42.90
Turnout		12,892,578	58.45
Registered electors		22,057,154	

=== By county ===
==== On recall question ====
Here are the results of the recall election by county. Khaki represents counties won by No. Light blue represents counties won by Yes.

County	No		Yes	
County	%	#	%	#
Alameda	81.2%	465,901	18.8%	108,081
Alpine	61.1%	354	38.9%	225
Amador	35.0%	6,957	65.0%	12,895
Butte	45.6%	36,128	54.4%	43,129
Calaveras	35.5%	8,320	64.5%	15,133
Colusa	33.4%	2,027	66.6%	4,037
Contra Costa	71.4%	324,747	28.6%	130,058
Del Norte	40.1%	3,505	59.9%	5,243
El Dorado	40.6%	39,907	59.4%	58,393
Fresno	48.7%	126,488	51.3%	133,309
Glenn	28.2%	2,485	71.8%	6,331
Humboldt	64.0%	33,164	36.0%	18,621
Imperial	59.4%	19,288	40.6%	13,177
Inyo	45.9%	3,502	54.1%	4,134
Kern	38.2%	81,030	61.8%	131,061
Kings	36.3%	11,242	63.7%	19,710
Lake	51.0%	11,367	49.0%	10,923
Lassen	15.8%	1,604	84.2%	8,538
Los Angeles	70.8%	2,077,859	29.2%	855,940
Madera	38.8%	16,233	61.2%	25,638
Marin	81.7%	108,599	18.3%	24,273
Mariposa	38.6%	3,376	61.4%	5,378
Mendocino	64.7%	22,093	35.3%	12,075
Merced	48.0%	27,867	52.0%	30,210
Modoc	22.0%	730	78.0%	2,593
Mono	55.5%	2,805	44.5%	2,245
Monterey	67.9%	80,664	32.1%	38,169
Napa	67.6%	38,948	32.4%	18,681
Nevada	54.0%	29,851	46.0%	25,426
Orange	51.7%	586,457	48.3%	547,685
Placer	42.6%	85,677	57.4%	115,411
Plumas	36.8%	3,408	63.2%	5,842
Riverside	49.5%	355,630	50.5%	362,958
Sacramento	59.9%	329,952	40.1%	220,498
San Benito	57.8%	12,718	42.2%	9,276
San Bernardino	50.2%	288,877	49.8%	286,364
San Diego	57.2%	674,670	42.8%	505,081
San Francisco	86.1%	292,744	13.9%	47,193
San Joaquin	52.6%	105,405	47.4%	94,877
San Luis Obispo	52.8%	68,429	47.2%	61,203
San Mateo	77.9%	227,368	22.1%	64,390
Santa Barbara	61.8%	94,219	38.2%	58,149
Santa Clara	73.7%	468,851	26.3%	166,995
Santa Cruz	78.1%	90,874	21.9%	25,454
Shasta	30.4%	22,592	69.6%	51,608
Sierra	36.6%	616	63.4%	1,065
Siskiyou	38.1%	6,961	61.9%	11,295
Solano	62.7%	97,935	37.3%	58,372
Sonoma	73.7%	160,602	26.3%	57,419
Stanislaus	45.5%	69,247	54.5%	82,911
Sutter	36.2%	11,593	63.8%	20,458
Tehama	27.6%	6,386	72.4%	16,770
Trinity	43.8%	2,106	56.2%	2,699
Tulare	38.9%	41,009	61.1%	64,372
Tuolumne	38.4%	9,850	61.6%	15,832
Ventura	57.2%	182,470	42.8%	136,610
Yolo	67.9%	52,444	32.1%	24,769
Yuba	34.2%	7,961	65.8%	15,291
Totals	61.88%	7,944,092	38.12%	4,894,473

==== On replacement candidates ====
Here are the results of the election by county for replacement candidates. Red represents counties won by Elder. Blue represents a county won by Paffrath.

County	Elder		Paffrath		Faulconer		Ross		Others	
County	%	#	%	#	%	#	%	#	%	#
Alameda	26.83%	68,410	18.65%	47,543	7.36%	18,755	6.69%	17,067	40.48%	103,203
Alpine	48.01%	157	7.65%	25	3.98%	13	4.89%	16	35.47%	116
Amador	60.68%	8,862	3.20%	467	7.30%	1,066	2.09%	305	26.74%	3,905
Butte	52.41%	28,705	6.48%	3,547	3.80%	2,083	3.43%	1,876	33.88%	18,555
Calaveras	62.61%	10,660	2.93%	499	6.33%	1,077	1.81%	309	26.32%	4,481
Colusa	54.48%	2,574	3.45%	163	4.08%	193	2.33%	110	35.66%	1,685
Contra Costa	37.99%	91,262	12.78%	30,696	7.15%	17,165	8.08%	19,407	34.00%	81,670
Del Norte	64.23%	4,094	4.14%	264	2.68%	171	3.36%	214	25.59%	1,631
El Dorado	53.01%	37,507	4.76%	3,368	7.30%	5,162	2.77%	1,959	32.16%	22,753
Fresno	59.85%	103,060	5.55%	9,551	7.27%	12,514	3.14%	5,411	24.20%	41,669
Glenn	58.60%	4,202	2.86%	205	2.23%	160	2.15%	154	34.17%	2,450
Humboldt	45.58%	13,483	8.55%	2,528	3.87%	1,145	5.11%	1,511	36.89%	10,911
Imperial	50.25%	9,564	5.73%	1,091	4.17%	793	8.15%	1,551	31.70%	6,033
Inyo	63.05%	3,275	4.95%	257	6.55%	340	3.31%	172	22.14%	1,150
Kern	67.79%	99,969	4.87%	7,188	4.50%	6,634	1.41%	2,076	21.43%	31,609
Kings	66.81%	15,577	4.25%	991	5.17%	1,205	2.04%	476	21.73%	5,067
Lake	52.23%	7,259	4.77%	663	3.54%	492	3.42%	475	36.04%	5,008
Lassen	69.58%	6,293	1.43%	129	2.58%	233	1.25%	113	25.17%	2,276
Los Angeles	43.59%	648,067	10.22%	151,944	8.29%	123,331	7.93%	117,961	29.97%	445,562
Madera	65.13%	19,530	3.12%	936	6.52%	1,954	2.20%	660	23.04%	6,908
Marin	29.88%	15,901	16.57%	8,817	12.06%	6,417	11.65%	6,198	29.85%	15,887
Mariposa	63.14%	4,086	4.99%	323	5.97%	386	2.50%	162	23.40%	1,514
Mendocino	42.40%	7,799	7.51%	1,382	4.75%	873	4.08%	750	41.26%	7,589
Merced	61.54%	21,830	4.30%	1,525	3.75%	1,329	2.24%	796	28.17%	9,993
Modoc	62.01%	1,753	1.84%	52	2.12%	60	1.27%	36	32.76%	926
Mono	53.40%	1,690	8.78%	278	7.74%	245	3.70%	117	26.38%	835
Monterey	44.39%	27,841	11.37%	7,130	4.92%	3,088	5.35%	3,354	33.98%	21,312
Napa	43.02%	12,613	9.73%	2,853	7.17%	2,101	6.28%	1,841	33.80%	9,909
Nevada	47.97%	16,546	6.93%	2,390	8.24%	2,841	3.33%	1,149	33.53%	11,564
Orange	57.37%	423,224	8.09%	59,694	7.74%	57,109	3.61%	26,599	23.19%	171,030
Placer	52.02%	73,309	5.11%	7,207	7.53%	10,613	2.92%	4,110	32.42%	45,681
Plumas	57.46%	3,918	3.37%	230	6.22%	424	2.11%	144	30.84%	2,103
Riverside	60.70%	283,217	6.01%	28,046	5.83%	27,214	3.94%	18,379	23.52%	109,740
Sacramento	45.93%	147,776	8.89%	28,585	8.88%	28,579	5.21%	16,772	31.09%	100,010
San Benito	49.03%	6,848	9.21%	1,287	3.32%	464	4.57%	638	33.87%	4,731
San Bernardino	61.59%	225,674	5.47%	20,042	5.27%	19,296	3.85%	14,119	23.82%	87,295
San Diego	46.58%	355,417	10.76%	82,089	14.96%	114,155	4.10%	31,289	23.59%	180,009
San Francisco	20.95%	26,285	21.07%	26,434	11.41%	14,317	6.69%	8,387	39.87%	50,015
San Joaquin	54.16%	68,230	5.59%	7,047	6.26%	7,889	5.60%	7,058	28.38%	35,756
San Luis Obispo	53.68%	45,298	10.90%	9,195	6.64%	5,607	2.92%	2,460	25.87%	21,829
San Mateo	30.82%	41,162	17.43%	23,271	8.87%	11,845	7.62%	10,179	35.26%	47,091
Santa Barbara	49.04%	43,582	10.51%	9,344	6.66%	5,921	4.09%	3,633	29.69%	26,389
Santa Clara	32.79%	105,590	17.86%	57,503	7.50%	24,166	6.70%	21,568	35.15%	113,197
Santa Cruz	31.49%	17,494	17.21%	9,562	5.33%	2,960	7.42%	4,123	38.55%	21,420
Shasta	60.09%	36,022	3.21%	1,922	2.72%	1,631	2.65%	1,586	31.34%	18,788
Sierra	56.70%	698	2.84%	35	7.47%	92	1.22%	15	31.76%	391
Siskiyou	60.89%	8,127	3.30%	441	2.99%	399	3.08%	411	29.74%	3,970
Solano	47.18%	40,387	6.79%	5,813	6.23%	5,336	8.33%	7,132	31.47%	26,935
Sonoma	37.42%	38,131	12.69%	12,936	6.69%	6,821	7.75%	7,903	35.44%	36,119
Stanislaus	57.99%	58,812	4.02%	4,075	6.74%	6,835	5.45%	5,526	25.80%	26,171
Sutter	52.54%	12,440	3.63%	859	5.21%	1,233	2.53%	598	36.10%	8,546
Tehama	61.90%	11,529	2.83%	527	2.42%	451	1.65%	307	31.20%	5,812
Trinity	53.38%	1,770	3.41%	113	2.59%	86	2.20%	73	38.42%	1,274
Tulare	67.64%	51,152	3.85%	2,912	5.61%	4,241	2.46%	1,859	20.45%	15,464
Tuolumne	62.58%	11,374	3.32%	603	5.60%	1,017	2.41%	438	26.09%	4,742
Ventura	56.44%	108,043	7.79%	14,908	7.51%	14,372	3.76%	7,201	24.50%	46,909
Yolo	37.19%	15,911	10.40%	4,450	10.74%	4,596	6.83%	2,921	34.83%	14,900
Yuba	54.86%	9,878	4.68%	843	4.73%	851	2.08%	375	33.65%	6,060
Totals	48.41%	3,563,867	9.60%	706,778	8.02%	590,346	5.33%	392,029	28.64%	2,108,548

=== By congressional district ===
==== On recall question ====
Khaki represents congressional districts won by No. Light blue represents congressional districts won by Yes. All districts with incumbent Democratic representatives voted for No except one, and all districts with incumbent Republican representatives voted for Yes except two.

District	No	Yes	Representative
1st	38%	62%	Doug LaMalfa
2nd	73%	27%	Jared Huffman
3rd	52%	48%	John Garamendi
4th	41%	59%	Tom McClintock
5th	72%	28%	Mike Thompson
6th	70%	30%	Doris Matsui
7th	54%	46%	Ami Bera
8th	40%	60%	Jay Obernolte
9th	55%	45%	Jerry McNerney
10th	47%	53%	Josh Harder
11th	74%	26%	Mark DeSaulnier
12th	87%	13%	Nancy Pelosi
13th	90%	10%	Barbara Lee
14th	78%	22%	Jackie Speier
15th	72%	28%	Eric Swalwell
16th	54%	46%	Jim Costa
17th	74%	26%	Ro Khanna
18th	76%	24%	Anna Eshoo
19th	72%	28%	Zoe Lofgren
20th	71%	29%	Jimmy Panetta
21st	49%	51%	David Valadao
22nd	42%	58%	Devin Nunes
23rd	36%	64%	Kevin McCarthy
24th	58%	42%	Salud Carbajal
25th	51%	49%	Mike Garcia
26th	59%	41%	Julia Brownley
27th	67%	33%	Judy Chu
28th	74%	26%	Adam Schiff
29th	76%	24%	Tony Cárdenas
30th	69%	31%	Brad Sherman
31st	55%	45%	Pete Aguilar
32nd	65%	35%	Grace Napolitano
33rd	67%	33%	Ted Lieu
34th	84%	16%	Jimmy Gomez
35th	62%	38%	Norma Torres
36th	55%	45%	Raul Ruiz
37th	86%	14%	Karen Bass
38th	66%	34%	Linda Sánchez
39th	52%	48%	Young Kim
40th	79%	21%	Lucille Roybal-Allard
41st	58%	42%	Mark Takano
42nd	41%	59%	Ken Calvert
43rd	77%	23%	Maxine Waters
44th	80%	20%	Nanette Barragán
45th	53%	47%	Katie Porter
46th	64%	36%	Lou Correa
47th	62%	38%	Alan Lowenthal
48th	48%	52%	Michelle Steel
49th	51%	49%	Mike Levin
50th	41%	59%	Darrell Issa
51st	65%	35%	Juan Vargas
52nd	61%	39%	Scott Peters
53rd	65%	35%	Sara Jacobs

==== On replacement candidates ====
Elder swept all congressional districts except two, losing to Paffrath in 12th and 13th districts: the latter was the best performance for both Paffrath and Newsom. Conversely, Elder's best result was in the 23rd district, which supported recalling Newsom the most.

District	Elder	Paffrath	Faulconer	Ross	Representative
1st	57.07%	4.44%	4.17%	2.68%	Doug LaMalfa
2nd	38.5%	12.19%	7.57%	7.83%	Jared Huffman
3rd	49.32%	6.04%	6.69%	5.76%	John Garamendi
4th	55.02%	4.67%	7.28%	2.74%	Tom McClintock
5th	39.35%	11.14%	5.96%	7.18%	Mike Thompson
6th	38.75%	11.26%	9.75%	6.26%	Doris Matsui
7th	49.11%	7.71%	8.67%	4.86%	Ami Bera
8th	66.79%	4.45%	4.71%	2.5%	Jay Obernolte
9th	52.46%	6.28%	5.63%	6.47%	Jerry McNerney
10th	57.57%	4.38%	6.46%	5.75%	Josh Harder
11th	35.14%	14.07%	8.39%	7.66%	Mark DeSaulnier
12th	19.82%	21.65%	11.7%	6.8%	Nancy Pelosi
13th	14.65%	24.49%	8.31%	7.47%	Barbara Lee
14th	31.02%	16.88%	8.3%	7.52%	Jackie Speier
15th	36.62%	14.15%	6.81%	6.4%	Eric Swalwell
16th	56.51%	5.49%	4.97%	3.15%	Jim Costa
17th	30.95%	17.39%	6.96%	6.92%	Ro Khanna
18th	31.53%	20.14%	9.63%	6.86%	Anna Eshoo
19th	35.79%	15.05%	5.75%	6.33%	Zoe Lofgren
20th	40.06%	13.24%	4.85%	6.0%	Jimmy Panetta
21st	62.06%	5.29%	4.49%	2.61%	David Valadao
22nd	64.59%	4.72%	7.5%	2.73%	Devin Nunes
23rd	68.27%	4.44%	4.78%	1.61%	Kevin McCarthy
24th	51.41%	10.69%	6.66%	3.51%	Salud Carbajal
25th	60.07%	5.92%	6.16%	3.45%	Mike Garcia
26th	54.97%	8.22%	7.83%	4.07%	Julia Brownley
27th	45.39%	9.48%	10.45%	7.51%	Judy Chu
28th	39.36%	12.99%	9.72%	6.99%	Adam Schiff
29th	37.1%	10.46%	5.67%	7.41%	Tony Cárdenas
30th	46.13%	10.44%	9.53%	6.81%	Brad Sherman
31st	58.83%	5.92%	5.92%	4.09%	Pete Aguilar
32nd	49.47%	7.18%	5.95%	9.05%	Grace Napolitano
33rd	46.93%	11.43%	13.37%	5.52%	Ted Lieu
34th	24.59%	13.66%	8.25%	11.51%	Jimmy Gomez
35th	52.46%	7.17%	4.82%	6.73%	Norma Torres
36th	57.48%	6.46%	5.66%	6.1%	Raul Ruiz
37th	26.32%	15.24%	11.14%	15.27%	Karen Bass
38th	50.43%	7.12%	5.28%	12.94%	Linda Sánchez
39th	58.04%	7.15%	7.28%	6.78%	Young Kim
40th	34.86%	9.86%	3.89%	13.74%	Lucille Roybal-Allard
41st	55.31%	7.02%	5.26%	4.22%	Mark Takano
42nd	65.62%	5.16%	6.01%	2.52%	Ken Calvert
43rd	39.44%	11.72%	6.84%	5.68%	Maxine Waters
44th	35.85%	10.45%	3.9%	6.17%	Nanette Barragán
45th	57.5%	9.09%	8.08%	3.52%	Katie Porter
46th	44.63%	10.25%	5.73%	4.35%	Lou Correa
47th	48.67%	9.92%	7.56%	3.72%	Alan Lowenthal
48th	60.31%	7.34%	8.58%	2.77%	Michelle Steel
49th	54.14%	9.15%	12.51%	3.44%	Mike Levin
50th	58.89%	6.27%	11.37%	2.74%	Darrell Issa
51st	40.35%	12.05%	10.79%	5.36%	Juan Vargas
52nd	41.9%	12.53%	19.15%	4.73%	Scott Peters
53rd	40.3%	13.01%	15.1%	4.84%	Sara Jacobs

=== By city ===
==== On recall question ====
By municipality

Official outcome by city and unincorporated areas of counties, of which No won 361 & Yes won 178.
City	County	Yes		No		Margin		Total Votes	2018 to 2021 Swing% (Cox 2018 to "Yes") (Note: Yes margins are compared to Republican margins from the 2018 election, and No margins are compared to Democratic margins from the 2018 election.)
City	County	#	%	#	%	#	%	Total Votes	2018 to 2021 Swing% (Cox 2018 to "Yes")
Alameda	Alameda	5,401	15.94%	28,481	84.06%	23,080	−68.12%	33,882	−3.85%
Albany	Alameda	784	8.58%	8,356	91.42%	7,572	−82.84%	9,140	−0.72%
Berkeley	Alameda	2,813	5.34%	49,819	94.66%	47,006	−89.31%	52,632	0.08%
Dublin	Alameda	5,878	27.61%	15,413	72.39%	9,535	−44.78%	21,291	−6.87%
Emeryville	Alameda	411	9.13%	4,092	90.87%	3,681	−81.75%	4,503	1.34%
Fremont	Alameda	17,937	25.94%	51,217	74.06%	33,280	−48.12%	69,154	−5.84%
Hayward	Alameda	8,684	20.97%	32,733	79.03%	24,049	−58.07%	41,417	0.54%
Livermore	Alameda	14,965	38.85%	23,556	61.15%	8,591	−22.30%	38,521	−7.12%
Newark	Alameda	3,599	25.47%	10,533	74.53%	6,934	−49.07%	14,132	−3.85%
Oakland	Alameda	11,127	7.53%	136,550	92.47%	125,423	−84.93%	147,677	0.29%
Piedmont	Alameda	987	13.80%	6,164	86.20%	5,177	−72.40%	7,151	−7.69%
Pleasanton	Alameda	10,558	32.36%	22,064	67.64%	11,506	−35.27%	32,622	−11.55%
San Leandro	Alameda	5,717	20.94%	21,586	79.06%	15,869	−58.12%	27,303	−1.25%
Union City	Alameda	4,906	21.63%	17,772	78.37%	12,866	−56.73%	22,678	−1.88%
Unincorporated Area	Alameda	14,314	27.59%	37,565	72.41%	23,251	−44.82%	51,879	−2.42%
Unincorporated Area	Alpine	225	38.86%	354	61.14%	129	−22.28%	579	3.25%
Amador	Amador	49	34.51%	93	65.49%	44	−30.99%	142	−13.13%
Ione	Amador	1,854	72.31%	710	27.69%	−1,144	44.62%	2,564	2.43%
Jackson	Amador	1,334	57.65%	980	42.35%	−354	15.30%	2,314	1.88%
Plymouth	Amador	347	66.73%	173	33.27%	−174	33.46%	520	−2.14%
Sutter Creek	Amador	811	56.95%	613	43.05%	−198	13.90%	1,424	−3.72%
Unincorporated Area	Amador	8,500	65.95%	4,388	34.05%	−4,112	31.91%	12,888	0.75%
Biggs	Butte	391	68.24%	182	31.76%	−209	36.47%	573	7.57%
Chico	Butte	15,221	41.62%	21,348	58.38%	6,127	−16.75%	36,569	3.78%
Gridley	Butte	1,103	60.04%	734	39.96%	−369	20.09%	1,837	7.43%
Oroville	Butte	3,252	63.23%	1,891	36.77%	−1,361	26.46%	5,143	4.58%
Paradise	Butte	2,417	65.38%	1,280	34.62%	−1,137	30.75%	3,697	12.08%
Unincorporated Area	Butte	20,745	65.99%	10,693	34.01%	−10,052	31.97%	31,438	3.79%
Angels	Calaveras	1,157	61.90%	712	38.10%	−445	23.81%	1,869	−1.05%
Unincorporated Area	Calaveras	13,976	64.75%	7,608	35.25%	−6,368	29.50%	21,584	1.07%
Colusa	Colusa	1,207	64.89%	653	35.11%	−554	29.78%	1,860	−4.53%
Williams	Colusa	370	45.40%	445	54.60%	75	−9.20%	815	8.37%
Unincorporated Area	Colusa	2,460	72.59%	929	27.41%	−1,531	45.18%	3,389	4.20%
Antioch	Contra Costa	9,381	28.28%	23,786	71.72%	14,405	−43.43%	33,167	−5.35%
Brentwood	Contra Costa	11,646	43.71%	14,998	56.29%	3,352	−12.58%	26,644	−6.34%
Clayton	Contra Costa	2,636	40.80%	3,825	59.20%	1,189	−18.40%	6,461	−12.80%
Concord	Contra Costa	13,947	30.10%	32,390	69.90%	18,443	−39.80%	46,337	−7.64%
Danville	Contra Costa	9,331	38.36%	14,994	61.64%	5,663	−23.28%	24,325	−10.91%
El Cerrito	Contra Costa	1,314	9.89%	11,968	90.11%	10,654	−80.21%	13,282	−2.32%
Hercules	Contra Costa	2,029	18.87%	8,726	81.13%	6,697	−62.27%	10,755	−5.97%
Lafayette	Contra Costa	3,783	25.85%	10,849	74.15%	7,066	−48.29%	14,632	−9.11%
Martinez	Contra Costa	5,598	30.16%	12,964	69.84%	7,366	−39.68%	18,562	−5.12%
Moraga	Contra Costa	2,273	25.57%	6,617	74.43%	4,344	−48.86%	8,890	−15.75%
Oakley	Contra Costa	6,636	44.77%	8,185	55.23%	1,549	−10.45%	14,821	0.40%
Orinda	Contra Costa	2,737	23.68%	8,821	76.32%	6,084	−52.64%	11,558	−10.57%
Pinole	Contra Costa	1,819	22.76%	6,173	77.24%	4,354	−54.48%	7,992	−7.55%
Pittsburg	Contra Costa	4,348	21.96%	15,451	78.04%	11,103	−56.08%	19,799	−4.17%
Pleasant Hill	Contra Costa	4,493	26.94%	12,182	73.06%	7,689	−46.11%	16,675	−6.88%
Richmond	Contra Costa	3,671	11.21%	29,079	88.79%	25,408	−77.58%	32,750	−2.72%
San Pablo	Contra Costa	764	13.11%	5,063	86.89%	4,299	−73.78%	5,827	−1.10%
San Ramon	Contra Costa	9,814	29.73%	23,194	70.27%	13,380	−40.54%	33,008	−10.62%
Walnut Creek	Contra Costa	9,387	25.53%	27,377	74.47%	17,990	−48.93%	36,764	−10.84%
Unincorporated Area	Contra Costa	24,451	33.70%	48,105	66.30%	23,654	−32.60%	72,556	−5.23%
Crescent City	Del Norte	504	50.35%	497	49.65%	−7	0.70%	1,001	2.84%
Unincorporated Area	Del Norte	4,739	61.17%	3,008	38.83%	−1,731	22.34%	7,747	2.37%
Placerville	El Dorado	2,419	51.85%	2,246	48.15%	−173	3.71%	4,665	2.05%
South Lake Tahoe	El Dorado	2,226	38.53%	3,552	61.47%	1,326	−22.95%	5,778	6.73%
Unincorporated Area	El Dorado	53,748	61.18%	34,109	38.82%	−19,639	22.35%	87,857	−1.72%
Clovis	Fresno	28,186	61.54%	17,616	38.46%	−10,570	23.08%	45,802	−0.36%
Coalinga	Fresno	1,747	58.68%	1,230	41.32%	−517	17.37%	2,977	4.09%
Firebaugh	Fresno	370	33.45%	736	66.55%	366	−33.09%	1,106	0.55%
Fowler	Fresno	891	46.00%	1,046	54.00%	155	−8.00%	1,937	−5.54%
Fresno	Fresno	55,492	43.84%	71,084	56.16%	15,592	−12.32%	126,576	−0.25%
Huron	Fresno	75	17.56%	352	82.44%	277	−64.87%	427	−6.43%
Kerman	Fresno	1,388	44.62%	1,723	55.38%	335	−10.77%	3,111	−0.10%
Kingsburg	Fresno	3,376	71.31%	1,358	28.69%	−2,018	42.63%	4,734	0.33%
Mendota	Fresno	181	21.73%	652	78.27%	471	−56.54%	833	−8.03%
Orange Cove	Fresno	258	27.95%	665	72.05%	407	−44.10%	923	7.62%
Parlier	Fresno	367	22.43%	1,269	77.57%	902	−55.13%	1,636	−7.80%
Reedley	Fresno	2,742	50.42%	2,696	49.58%	−46	0.85%	5,438	−1.16%
San Joaquin	Fresno	60	16.53%	303	83.47%	243	−66.94%	363	−12.59%
Sanger	Fresno	2,378	40.48%	3,496	59.52%	1,118	−19.03%	5,874	0.10%
Selma	Fresno	2,114	44.09%	2,681	55.91%	567	−11.82%	4,795	−2.87%
Unincorporated Area	Fresno	33,684	63.24%	19,581	36.76%	−14,103	26.48%	53,265	1.16%
Orland	Glenn	1,230	61.13%	782	38.87%	−448	22.27%	2,012	3.60%
Willows	Glenn	1,284	69.41%	566	30.59%	−718	38.81%	1,850	−2.43%
Unincorporated Area	Glenn	3,817	77.05%	1,137	22.95%	−2,680	54.10%	4,954	2.86%
Arcata	Humboldt	1,071	15.75%	5,731	84.25%	4,660	−68.51%	6,802	2.94%
Blue Lake	Humboldt	149	25.73%	430	74.27%	281	−48.53%	579	−3.43%
Eureka	Humboldt	2,723	30.19%	6,298	69.81%	3,575	−39.63%	9,021	−5.33%
Ferndale	Humboldt	357	46.12%	417	53.88%	60	−7.75%	774	−5.23%
Fortuna	Humboldt	2,434	57.06%	1,832	42.94%	−602	14.11%	4,266	−0.23%
Rio Dell	Humboldt	629	63.22%	366	36.78%	−263	26.43%	995	4.02%
Trinidad	Humboldt	40	20.73%	153	79.27%	113	−58.55%	193	−2.36%
Unincorporated Area	Humboldt	11,218	38.48%	17,937	61.52%	6,719	−23.05%	29,155	0.52%
Brawley	Imperial	2,281	43.37%	2,979	56.63%	698	−13.27%	5,260	0.25%
Calexico	Imperial	1,223	21.46%	4,477	78.54%	3,254	−57.09%	5,700	4.99%
Calipatria	Imperial	202	37.48%	337	62.52%	135	−25.05%	539	−7.99%
El Centro	Imperial	3,484	38.81%	5,494	61.19%	2,010	−22.39%	8,978	2.23%
Holtville	Imperial	540	47.70%	592	52.30%	52	−4.59%	1,132	9.67%
Imperial	Imperial	2,308	49.14%	2,389	50.86%	81	−1.72%	4,697	3.50%
Westmorland	Imperial	106	32.72%	218	67.28%	112	−34.57%	324	−16.70%
Unincorporated Area	Imperial	3,033	51.98%	2,802	48.02%	−231	3.96%	5,835	1.96%
Bishop	Inyo	621	45.97%	730	54.03%	109	−8.07%	1,351	−0.50%
Unincorporated Area	Inyo	3,513	55.89%	2,772	44.11%	−741	11.79%	6,285	−2.68%
Arvin	Kern	401	25.89%	1,148	74.11%	747	−48.22%	1,549	2.45%
Bakersfield	Kern	59,567	58.41%	42,408	41.59%	−17,159	16.83%	101,975	5.58%
California City	Kern	1,722	55.98%	1,354	44.02%	−368	11.96%	3,076	−5.79%
Delano	Kern	1,678	30.00%	3,916	70.00%	2,238	−40.01%	5,594	3.14%
Maricopa	Kern	216	86.06%	35	13.94%	−181	72.11%	251	13.07%
McFarland	Kern	432	31.30%	948	68.70%	516	−37.39%	1,380	3.24%
Ridgecrest	Kern	6,375	66.95%	3,147	33.05%	−3,228	33.90%	9,522	−0.92%
Shafter	Kern	1,961	58.12%	1,413	41.88%	−548	16.24%	3,374	14.37%
Taft	Kern	1,697	85.23%	294	14.77%	−1,403	70.47%	1,991	8.26%
Tehachapi	Kern	2,216	68.71%	1,009	31.29%	−1,207	37.43%	3,225	2.87%
Wasco	Kern	1,295	44.66%	1,605	55.34%	310	−10.69%	2,900	6.45%
Unincorporated Area	Kern	53,501	69.25%	23,753	30.75%	−29,748	38.51%	77,254	6.01%
Avenal	Kings	252	36.15%	445	63.85%	193	−27.69%	697	6.50%
Corcoran	Kings	903	47.45%	1,000	52.55%	97	−5.10%	1,903	14.86%
Hanford	Kings	9,598	62.67%	5,716	37.33%	−3,882	25.35%	15,314	6.99%
Lemoore	Kings	4,099	63.87%	2,319	36.13%	−1,780	27.73%	6,418	6.26%
Unincorporated Area	Kings	4,858	73.38%	1,762	26.62%	−3,096	46.77%	6,620	9.44%
Clearlake	Lake	1,429	44.30%	1,797	55.70%	368	−11.41%	3,226	2.54%
Lakeport	Lake	902	46.74%	1,028	53.26%	126	−6.53%	1,930	−3.57%
Unincorporated Area	Lake	8,592	50.15%	8,542	49.85%	−50	0.29%	17,134	0.80%
Susanville	Lassen	2,727	82.31%	586	17.69%	−2,141	64.62%	3,313	16.93%
Unincorporated Area	Lassen	5,811	85.09%	1,018	14.91%	−4,793	70.19%	6,829	12.18%
Agoura Hills	Los Angeles	4,139	38.79%	6,531	61.21%	2,392	−22.42%	10,670	−3.23%
Alhambra	Los Angeles	6,503	27.15%	17,452	72.85%	10,949	−45.71%	23,955	−1.87%
Arcadia	Los Angeles	7,502	42.07%	10,331	57.93%	2,829	−15.86%	17,833	−9.25%
Artesia	Los Angeles	1,485	36.41%	2,593	63.59%	1,108	−27.17%	4,078	0.67%
Avalon	Los Angeles	420	46.10%	491	53.90%	71	−7.79%	911	4.75%
Azusa	Los Angeles	4,011	34.45%	7,632	65.55%	3,621	−31.10%	11,643	1.27%
Baldwin Park	Los Angeles	3,523	24.25%	11,005	75.75%	7,482	−51.50%	14,528	5.99%
Bell	Los Angeles	920	17.05%	4,476	82.95%	3,556	−65.90%	5,396	1.20%
Bell Gardens	Los Angeles	930	17.07%	4,517	82.93%	3,587	−65.85%	5,447	6.33%
Bellflower	Los Angeles	6,064	32.63%	12,522	67.37%	6,458	−34.75%	18,586	2.20%
Beverly Hills	Los Angeles	6,297	45.71%	7,479	54.29%	1,182	−8.58%	13,776	17.17%
Bradbury	Los Angeles	219	57.33%	163	42.67%	−56	14.66%	382	7.81%
Burbank	Los Angeles	13,714	31.39%	29,980	68.61%	16,266	−37.23%	43,694	0.45%
Calabasas	Los Angeles	4,311	38.55%	6,872	61.45%	2,561	−22.90%	11,183	1.19%
Carson	Los Angeles	6,477	21.04%	24,304	78.96%	17,827	−57.92%	30,781	−0.33%
Cerritos	Los Angeles	7,214	35.50%	13,105	64.50%	5,891	−28.99%	20,319	−10.00%
Claremont	Los Angeles	5,075	31.77%	10,897	68.23%	5,822	−36.45%	15,972	−5.74%
Commerce	Los Angeles	616	19.88%	2,483	80.12%	1,867	−60.25%	3,099	6.76%
Compton	Los Angeles	1,789	10.46%	15,313	89.54%	13,524	−79.08%	17,102	2.00%
Covina	Los Angeles	6,586	39.76%	9,979	60.24%	3,393	−20.48%	16,565	−1.34%
Cudahy	Los Angeles	432	14.93%	2,461	85.07%	2,029	−70.13%	2,893	0.32%
Culver City	Los Angeles	3,284	17.08%	15,941	82.92%	12,657	−65.84%	19,225	−0.88%
Diamond Bar	Los Angeles	7,876	41.14%	11,269	58.86%	3,393	−17.72%	19,145	−8.32%
Downey	Los Angeles	10,387	32.69%	21,389	67.31%	11,002	−34.62%	31,776	2.32%
Duarte	Los Angeles	2,482	32.42%	5,173	67.58%	2,691	−35.15%	7,655	−2.95%
El Monte	Los Angeles	4,674	27.00%	12,639	73.00%	7,965	−46.01%	17,313	3.81%
El Segundo	Los Angeles	3,228	38.79%	5,094	61.21%	1,866	−22.42%	8,322	−4.55%
Gardena	Los Angeles	3,728	22.07%	13,162	77.93%	9,434	−55.86%	16,890	0.97%
Glendale	Los Angeles	20,713	35.54%	37,571	64.46%	16,858	−28.92%	58,284	2.68%
Glendora	Los Angeles	11,896	53.51%	10,334	46.49%	−1,562	7.03%	22,230	−4.74%
Hawaiian Gardens	Los Angeles	623	26.87%	1,696	73.13%	1,073	−46.27%	2,319	3.89%
Hawthorne	Los Angeles	4,066	20.42%	15,847	79.58%	11,781	−59.16%	19,913	3.55%
Hermosa Beach	Los Angeles	3,390	35.45%	6,172	64.55%	2,782	−29.09%	9,562	0.90%
Hidden Hills	Los Angeles	460	46.61%	527	53.39%	67	−6.79%	987	4.35%
Huntington Park	Los Angeles	1,298	15.58%	7,031	84.42%	5,733	−68.83%	8,329	2.30%
Industry	Los Angeles	33	55.93%	26	44.07%	−7	11.86%	59	64.50%
Inglewood	Los Angeles	2,889	9.59%	27,235	90.41%	24,346	−80.82%	30,124	1.36%
Irwindale	Los Angeles	164	32.16%	346	67.84%	182	−35.69%	510	13.05%
La Canada Flintridge	Los Angeles	4,447	41.17%	6,355	58.83%	1,908	−17.66%	10,802	−10.32%
La Habra Heights	Los Angeles	1,659	59.81%	1,115	40.19%	−544	19.61%	2,774	−3.97%
La Mirada	Los Angeles	8,422	47.13%	9,449	52.87%	1,027	−5.75%	17,871	−4.75%
La Puente	Los Angeles	2,038	24.83%	6,171	75.17%	4,133	−50.35%	8,209	3.53%
La Verne	Los Angeles	7,892	51.93%	7,304	48.07%	−588	3.87%	15,196	−3.85%
Lakewood	Los Angeles	13,419	41.22%	19,139	58.78%	5,720	−17.57%	32,558	−3.09%
Lancaster	Los Angeles	18,817	46.57%	21,590	53.43%	2,773	−6.86%	40,407	4.23%
Lawndale	Los Angeles	1,871	26.67%	5,144	73.33%	3,273	−46.66%	7,015	4.47%
Lomita	Los Angeles	3,093	43.01%	4,098	56.99%	1,005	−13.98%	7,191	−0.74%
Long Beach	Los Angeles	40,402	28.62%	100,770	71.38%	60,368	−42.76%	141,172	−0.07%
Los Angeles	Los Angeles	246,360	22.86%	831,326	77.14%	584,966	−54.28%	1,077,686	4.04%
Lynwood	Los Angeles	1,547	14.04%	9,473	85.96%	7,926	−71.92%	11,020	−0.71%
Malibu	Los Angeles	2,094	38.32%	3,370	61.68%	1,276	−23.35%	5,464	6.05%
Manhattan Beach	Los Angeles	7,413	39.37%	11,416	60.63%	4,003	−21.26%	18,829	−2.13%
Maywood	Los Angeles	565	14.43%	3,350	85.57%	2,785	−71.14%	3,915	1.70%
Monrovia	Los Angeles	5,087	35.00%	9,448	65.00%	4,361	−30.00%	14,535	−5.46%
Montebello	Los Angeles	3,933	24.28%	12,268	75.72%	8,335	−51.45%	16,201	0.88%
Monterey Park	Los Angeles	4,628	28.60%	11,555	71.40%	6,927	−42.80%	16,183	−6.74%
Norwalk	Los Angeles	7,471	29.14%	18,165	70.86%	10,694	−41.71%	25,636	1.23%
Palmdale	Los Angeles	15,073	39.55%	23,042	60.45%	7,969	−20.91%	38,115	4.35%
Palos Verdes Estates	Los Angeles	3,846	49.21%	3,970	50.79%	124	−1.59%	7,816	−7.87%
Paramount	Los Angeles	1,871	20.04%	7,465	79.96%	5,594	−59.92%	9,336	3.08%
Pasadena	Los Angeles	13,064	23.34%	42,903	76.66%	29,839	−53.32%	55,967	−3.43%
Pico Rivera	Los Angeles	4,204	23.00%	14,072	77.00%	9,868	−53.99%	18,276	4.39%
Pomona	Los Angeles	9,371	29.84%	22,036	70.16%	12,665	−40.33%	31,407	5.08%
Rancho Palos Verdes	Los Angeles	9,460	44.82%	11,645	55.18%	2,185	−10.35%	21,105	−9.58%
Redondo Beach	Los Angeles	11,302	35.14%	20,859	64.86%	9,557	−29.72%	32,161	−2.67%
Rolling Hills	Los Angeles	698	62.66%	416	37.34%	−282	25.31%	1,114	−7.50%
Rolling Hills Estates	Los Angeles	2,203	48.79%	2,312	51.21%	109	−2.41%	4,515	−9.41%
Rosemead	Los Angeles	2,932	28.63%	7,309	71.37%	4,377	−42.74%	10,241	1.62%
San Dimas	Los Angeles	7,703	51.68%	7,201	48.32%	−502	3.37%	14,904	−4.04%
San Fernando	Los Angeles	1,251	22.18%	4,390	77.82%	3,139	−55.65%	5,641	2.07%
San Gabriel	Los Angeles	3,280	32.36%	6,856	67.64%	3,576	−35.28%	10,136	−3.17%
San Marino	Los Angeles	2,493	43.31%	3,263	56.69%	770	−13.38%	5,756	−16.72%
Santa Clarita	Los Angeles	44,667	49.24%	46,044	50.76%	1,377	−1.52%	90,711	−2.30%
Santa Fe Springs	Los Angeles	1,798	31.63%	3,887	68.37%	2,089	−36.75%	5,685	3.56%
Santa Monica	Los Angeles	8,431	19.70%	34,372	80.30%	25,941	−60.61%	42,803	2.58%
Sierra Madre	Los Angeles	2,178	35.39%	3,977	64.61%	1,799	−29.23%	6,155	−5.91%
Signal Hill	Los Angeles	1,038	26.09%	2,940	73.91%	1,902	−47.81%	3,978	−3.50%
South El Monte	Los Angeles	852	23.11%	2,835	76.89%	1,983	−53.78%	3,687	5.78%
South Gate	Los Angeles	3,229	17.98%	14,726	82.02%	11,497	−64.03%	17,955	1.99%
South Pasadena	Los Angeles	2,600	20.64%	9,998	79.36%	7,398	−58.72%	12,598	−6.61%
Temple City	Los Angeles	4,425	40.20%	6,582	59.80%	2,157	−19.60%	11,007	−7.77%
Torrance	Los Angeles	23,750	40.72%	34,569	59.28%	10,819	−18.55%	58,319	−5.71%
Vernon	Los Angeles	18	26.47%	50	73.53%	32	−47.06%	68	0.77%
Walnut	Los Angeles	4,211	38.04%	6,859	61.96%	2,648	−23.92%	11,070	−7.39%
West Covina	Los Angeles	11,303	34.50%	21,455	65.50%	10,152	−30.99%	32,758	−0.04%
West Hollywood	Los Angeles	2,782	16.61%	13,970	83.39%	11,188	−66.79%	16,752	8.90%
Westlake Village	Los Angeles	2,122	45.34%	2,558	54.66%	436	−9.32%	4,680	−3.98%
Whittier	Los Angeles	12,312	39.27%	19,041	60.73%	6,729	−21.46%	31,353	−0.23%
Unincorporated Area	Los Angeles	90,897	32.05%	192,713	67.95%	101,816	−35.90%	283,610	1.64%
Chowchilla	Madera	2,169	66.01%	1,117	33.99%	−1,052	32.01%	3,286	2.32%
Madera	Madera	5,005	46.04%	5,867	53.96%	862	−7.93%	10,872	0.48%
Unincorporated Area	Madera	18,464	66.63%	9,249	33.37%	−9,215	33.25%	27,713	−0.67%
Belvedere	Marin	359	29.07%	876	70.93%	517	−41.86%	1,235	−9.56%
Corte Madera	Marin	871	15.62%	4,705	84.38%	3,834	−68.76%	5,576	−5.29%
Fairfax	Marin	468	9.99%	4,217	90.01%	3,749	−80.02%	4,685	0.40%
Larkspur	Marin	1,220	16.64%	6,110	83.36%	4,890	−66.71%	7,330	−4.20%
Mill Valley	Marin	995	11.66%	7,538	88.34%	6,543	−76.68%	8,533	−3.36%
Novato	Marin	6,367	25.13%	18,968	74.87%	12,601	−49.74%	25,335	−7.46%
Ross	Marin	315	24.19%	987	75.81%	672	−51.61%	1,302	−7.27%
San Anselmo	Marin	948	12.32%	6,745	87.68%	5,797	−75.35%	7,693	−1.69%
San Rafael	Marin	4,367	17.44%	20,677	82.56%	16,310	−65.13%	25,044	−4.85%
Sausalito	Marin	726	16.61%	3,644	83.39%	2,918	−66.77%	4,370	−2.88%
Tiburon	Marin	1,175	22.98%	3,939	77.02%	2,764	−54.05%	5,114	−5.28%
Unincorporated Area	Marin	6,462	17.63%	30,193	82.37%	23,731	−64.74%	36,655	−3.59%
Unincorporated Area	Mariposa	5,378	61.43%	3,376	38.57%	−2,002	22.87%	8,754	0.26%
Fort Bragg	Mendocino	706	28.35%	1,784	71.65%	1,078	−43.29%	2,490	0.12%
Point Arena	Mendocino	26	15.95%	137	84.05%	111	−68.10%	163	0.03%
Ukiah	Mendocino	1,883	36.44%	3,284	63.56%	1,401	−27.11%	5,167	4.48%
Willits	Mendocino	614	39.66%	934	60.34%	320	−20.67%	1,548	6.12%
Unincorporated Area	Mendocino	8,846	35.67%	15,954	64.33%	7,108	−28.66%	24,800	3.21%
Atwater	Merced	3,788	54.59%	3,151	45.41%	−637	9.18%	6,939	5.33%
Dos Palos	Merced	622	55.34%	502	44.66%	−120	10.68%	1,124	7.97%
Gustine	Merced	784	56.04%	615	43.96%	−169	12.08%	1,399	8.31%
Livingston	Merced	653	29.04%	1,596	70.96%	943	−41.93%	2,249	4.97%
Los Banos	Merced	3,859	44.82%	4,751	55.18%	892	−10.36%	8,610	6.33%
Merced	Merced	7,779	43.88%	9,947	56.12%	2,168	−12.23%	17,726	4.29%
Unincorporated Area	Merced	12,725	63.53%	7,305	36.47%	−5,420	27.06%	20,030	11.89%
Alturas	Modoc	669	74.92%	224	25.08%	−445	49.83%	893	10.13%
Unincorporated Area	Modoc	1,924	79.18%	506	20.82%	−1,418	58.35%	2,430	1.56%
Mammoth Lakes	Mono	857	35.21%	1,577	64.79%	720	−29.58%	2,434	−1.85%
Unincorporated Area	Mono	1,388	53.06%	1,228	46.94%	−160	6.12%	2,616	2.36%
Carmel-by-the-Sea	Monterey	648	31.50%	1,409	68.50%	761	−37.00%	2,057	−9.23%
Del Rey Oaks	Monterey	303	33.26%	608	66.74%	305	−33.48%	911	−2.02%
Gonzales	Monterey	458	29.95%	1,071	70.05%	613	−40.09%	1,529	10.06%
Greenfield	Monterey	541	22.87%	1,825	77.13%	1,284	−54.27%	2,366	−0.56%
King City	Monterey	596	38.98%	933	61.02%	337	−22.04%	1,529	7.11%
Marina	Monterey	2,076	29.37%	4,993	70.63%	2,917	−41.26%	7,069	−5.38%
Monterey	Monterey	3,028	27.53%	7,969	72.47%	4,941	−44.93%	10,997	−4.87%
Pacific Grove	Monterey	1,852	23.44%	6,049	76.56%	4,197	−53.12%	7,901	−9.20%
Salinas	Monterey	8,849	28.60%	22,090	71.40%	13,241	−42.80%	30,939	−2.36%
Sand City	Monterey	48	32.88%	98	67.12%	50	−34.25%	146	−11.29%
Seaside	Monterey	2,177	27.14%	5,844	72.86%	3,667	−45.72%	8,021	−2.33%
Soledad	Monterey	802	25.30%	2,368	74.70%	1,566	−49.40%	3,170	4.69%
Unincorporated Area	Monterey	16,791	39.79%	25,407	60.21%	8,616	−20.42%	42,198	−5.86%
American Canyon	Napa	2,124	27.43%	5,620	72.57%	3,496	−45.14%	7,744	−4.63%
Calistoga	Napa	493	26.38%	1,376	73.62%	883	−47.24%	1,869	0.60%
Napa	Napa	10,246	31.41%	22,372	68.59%	12,126	−37.18%	32,618	−5.22%
St. Helena	Napa	687	26.17%	1,938	73.83%	1,251	−47.66%	2,625	−7.45%
Yountville	Napa	417	29.79%	983	70.21%	566	−40.43%	1,400	−9.08%
Unincorporated Area	Napa	4,714	41.45%	6,659	58.55%	1,945	−17.10%	11,373	−5.81%
Grass Valley	Nevada	2,376	41.44%	3,358	58.56%	982	−17.13%	5,734	−4.98%
Nevada City	Nevada	460	24.92%	1,386	75.08%	926	−50.16%	1,846	−16.78%
Truckee	Nevada	2,180	27.75%	5,677	72.25%	3,497	−44.51%	7,857	−1.65%
Unincorporated Area	Nevada	20,410	51.23%	19,430	48.77%	−980	2.46%	39,840	0.41%
Aliso Viejo	Orange	9,876	46.68%	11,283	53.32%	1,407	−6.65%	21,159	0.36%
Anaheim	Orange	38,393	42.37%	52,216	57.63%	13,823	−15.26%	90,609	−3.06%
Brea	Orange	10,147	51.77%	9,454	48.23%	−693	3.54%	19,601	−8.03%
Buena Park	Orange	9,962	42.60%	13,424	57.40%	3,462	−14.80%	23,386	−5.12%
Costa Mesa	Orange	18,289	47.95%	19,855	52.05%	1,566	−4.11%	38,144	4.73%
Cypress	Orange	9,293	48.10%	10,027	51.90%	734	−3.80%	19,320	−7.60%
Dana Point	Orange	9,779	56.29%	7,593	43.71%	−2,186	12.58%	17,372	−1.36%
Fountain Valley	Orange	12,755	51.82%	11,858	48.18%	−897	3.64%	24,613	−5.40%
Fullerton	Orange	20,153	44.17%	25,470	55.83%	5,317	−11.65%	45,623	−5.58%
Garden Grove	Orange	21,213	45.64%	25,263	54.36%	4,050	−8.71%	46,476	−3.24%
Huntington Beach	Orange	50,511	55.44%	40,593	44.56%	−9,918	10.89%	91,104	0.79%
Irvine	Orange	34,107	36.38%	59,653	63.62%	25,546	−27.25%	93,760	−3.86%
La Habra	Orange	8,696	45.15%	10,563	54.85%	1,867	−9.69%	19,259	−3.57%
La Palma	Orange	2,671	43.63%	3,451	56.37%	780	−12.74%	6,122	−11.70%
Laguna Beach	Orange	5,251	39.66%	7,988	60.34%	2,737	−20.67%	13,239	0.47%
Laguna Hills	Orange	7,059	50.98%	6,787	49.02%	−272	1.96%	13,846	−6.31%
Laguna Niguel	Orange	16,799	51.75%	15,665	48.25%	−1,134	3.49%	32,464	−3.47%
Laguna Woods	Orange	5,048	42.09%	6,946	57.91%	1,898	−15.82%	11,994	−12.93%
Lake Forest	Orange	17,669	49.55%	17,992	50.45%	323	−0.91%	35,661	−7.33%
Los Alamitos	Orange	2,380	50.31%	2,351	49.69%	−29	0.61%	4,731	−1.12%
Mission Viejo	Orange	24,593	52.43%	22,316	47.57%	−2,277	4.85%	46,909	−7.68%
Newport Beach	Orange	26,564	61.22%	16,826	38.78%	−9,738	22.44%	43,390	2.86%
Orange	Orange	25,481	50.02%	25,459	49.98%	−22	0.04%	50,940	−5.91%
Placentia	Orange	10,186	50.47%	9,997	49.53%	−189	0.94%	20,183	−6.53%
Rancho Santa Margarita	Orange	11,994	54.54%	9,998	45.46%	−1,996	9.08%	21,992	−5.81%
San Clemente	Orange	19,361	60.13%	12,836	39.87%	−6,525	20.27%	32,197	−0.25%
San Juan Capistrano	Orange	8,718	56.74%	6,647	43.26%	−2,071	13.48%	15,365	−1.78%
Santa Ana	Orange	18,144	30.57%	41,218	69.43%	23,074	−38.87%	59,362	2.36%
Seal Beach	Orange	7,230	49.00%	7,525	51.00%	295	−2.00%	14,755	−7.49%
Stanton	Orange	3,490	40.62%	5,102	59.38%	1,612	−18.76%	8,592	0.04%
Tustin	Orange	10,249	40.45%	15,089	59.55%	4,840	−19.10%	25,338	−6.01%
Villa Park	Orange	2,339	65.72%	1,220	34.28%	−1,119	31.44%	3,559	−8.05%
Westminster	Orange	13,919	48.77%	14,619	51.23%	700	−2.45%	28,538	−4.66%
Yorba Linda	Orange	21,646	62.58%	12,945	37.42%	−8,701	25.15%	34,591	−8.28%
Unincorporated Area	Orange	33,720	56.25%	26,228	43.75%	−7,492	12.50%	59,948	−5.04%
Auburn	Placer	3,912	51.53%	3,680	48.47%	−232	3.06%	7,592	−2.82%
Colfax	Placer	477	60.76%	308	39.24%	−169	21.53%	785	0.76%
Lincoln	Placer	15,021	58.09%	10,837	41.91%	−4,184	16.18%	25,858	−5.11%
Loomis	Placer	2,630	68.38%	1,216	31.62%	−1,414	36.77%	3,846	−1.13%
Rocklin	Placer	18,762	56.94%	14,191	43.06%	−4,571	13.87%	32,953	−2.75%
Roseville	Placer	36,997	54.28%	31,165	45.72%	−5,832	8.56%	68,162	−3.51%
Unincorporated Area	Placer	37,612	60.77%	24,280	39.23%	−13,332	21.54%	61,892	−1.04%
Portola	Plumas (Note: Plumas County amended its official final canvas to add one additional vote after the initial Statement of Vote was released, so the Supplement to the Statement of vote records one extra "Yes" vote both in Plumas County and statewide.)	431	58.96%	300	41.04%	−131	17.92%	731	−0.63%
Unincorporated Area	Plumas	5,412	63.52%	3,108	36.48%	−2,304	27.04%	8,520	0.77%
Banning	Riverside	5,052	51.83%	4,695	48.17%	−357	3.66%	9,747	−4.56%
Beaumont	Riverside	9,926	54.34%	8,341	45.66%	−1,585	8.68%	18,267	−2.19%
Blythe	Riverside	1,487	59.81%	999	40.19%	−488	19.63%	2,486	13.70%
Calimesa	Riverside	3,227	67.22%	1,574	32.78%	−1,653	34.43%	4,801	−1.54%
Canyon Lake	Riverside	4,709	79.46%	1,217	20.54%	−3,492	58.93%	5,926	5.81%
Cathedral City	Riverside	4,152	28.02%	10,664	71.98%	6,512	−43.95%	14,816	−4.25%
Coachella	Riverside	1,087	20.49%	4,219	79.51%	3,132	−59.03%	5,306	9.48%
Corona	Riverside	26,174	52.62%	23,567	47.38%	−2,607	5.24%	49,741	1.63%
Desert Hot Springs	Riverside	2,173	37.97%	3,550	62.03%	1,377	−24.06%	5,723	2.95%
Eastvale	Riverside	10,501	49.91%	10,537	50.09%	36	−0.17%	21,038	7.08%
Hemet	Riverside	12,473	52.43%	11,319	47.57%	−1,154	4.85%	23,792	−6.54%
Indian Wells	Riverside	1,558	59.92%	1,042	40.08%	−516	19.85%	2,600	−16.11%
Indio	Riverside	9,710	41.91%	13,456	58.09%	3,746	−16.17%	23,166	−0.37%
Jurupa Valley	Riverside	11,142	47.44%	12,343	52.56%	1,201	−5.11%	23,485	8.33%
La Quinta	Riverside	8,342	51.43%	7,877	48.57%	−465	2.87%	16,219	−7.14%
Lake Elsinore	Riverside	10,149	54.68%	8,413	45.32%	−1,736	9.35%	18,562	1.78%
Indio	Riverside	23,166	59.42%	15,822	40.58%	−7,344	18.84%	38,988	−4.70%
Moreno Valley	Riverside	15,913	35.65%	28,724	64.35%	12,811	−28.70%	44,637	1.36%
Murrieta	Riverside	25,433	62.06%	15,546	37.94%	−9,887	24.13%	40,979	−1.53%
Norco	Riverside	7,324	73.97%	2,577	26.03%	−4,747	47.94%	9,901	5.23%
Palm Desert	Riverside	10,250	46.51%	11,788	53.49%	1,538	−6.98%	22,038	−8.74%
Palm Springs	Riverside	4,270	20.13%	16,939	79.87%	12,669	−59.73%	21,209	−7.41%
Perris	Riverside	3,980	31.55%	8,633	68.45%	4,653	−36.89%	12,613	8.27%
Rancho Mirage	Riverside	3,899	39.67%	5,930	60.33%	2,031	−20.66%	9,829	−14.08%
Riverside	Riverside	38,930	45.58%	46,480	54.42%	7,550	−8.84%	85,410	3.54%
San Jacinto	Riverside	5,341	48.84%	5,595	51.16%	254	−2.32%	10,936	4.12%
Temecula	Riverside	24,740	59.09%	17,129	40.91%	−7,611	18.18%	41,869	−1.64%
Temecula	Riverside	8,085	65.59%	4,241	34.41%	−3,844	31.19%	12,326	1.99%
Unincorporated Area	Riverside	69,765	57.10%	52,413	42.90%	−17,352	14.20%	122,178	−0.98%
Citrus Heights	Sacramento	18,197	55.48%	14,600	44.52%	−3,597	10.97%	32,797	−0.61%
Elk Grove	Sacramento	26,252	38.55%	41,850	61.45%	15,598	−22.90%	68,102	−5.05%
Folsom	Sacramento	17,942	50.08%	17,883	49.92%	−59	0.16%	35,825	−7.15%
Galt	Sacramento	5,312	59.44%	3,625	40.56%	−1,687	18.88%	8,937	2.21%
Isleton	Sacramento	108	45.57%	129	54.43%	21	−8.86%	237	−1.04%
Rancho Cordova	Sacramento	11,483	44.90%	14,094	55.10%	2,611	−10.21%	25,577	−1.67%
Sacramento	Sacramento	41,866	24.94%	126,031	75.06%	84,165	−50.13%	167,897	−2.69%
Unincorporated Area	Sacramento	99,338	47.06%	111,740	52.94%	12,402	−5.88%	211,078	−1.75%
Hollister	San Benito	4,349	36.02%	7,726	63.98%	3,377	−27.97%	12,075	−2.58%
San Juan Bautista	San Benito	286	31.60%	619	68.40%	333	−36.80%	905	4.75%
Unincorporated Area	San Benito	4,641	51.49%	4,373	48.51%	−268	2.97%	9,014	−6.15%
Adelanto	San Bernardino	1,809	38.46%	2,894	61.54%	1,085	−23.07%	4,703	6.50%
Apple Valley	San Bernardino	16,844	66.15%	8,618	33.85%	−8,226	32.31%	25,462	−2.25%
Barstow	San Bernardino	2,502	55.24%	2,027	44.76%	−475	10.49%	4,529	2.89%
Big Bear Lake	San Bernardino	1,207	62.41%	727	37.59%	−480	24.82%	1,934	−6.56%
Chino	San Bernardino	13,501	49.74%	13,641	50.26%	140	−0.52%	27,142	2.30%
Chino Hills	San Bernardino	14,961	50.65%	14,575	49.35%	−386	1.31%	29,536	−3.51%
Colton	San Bernardino	3,664	34.46%	6,969	65.54%	3,305	−31.08%	10,633	4.29%
Fontana	San Bernardino	18,227	37.50%	30,373	62.50%	12,146	−24.99%	48,600	7.39%
Grand Terrace	San Bernardino	2,324	51.44%	2,194	48.56%	−130	2.88%	4,518	−0.10%
Hesperia	San Bernardino	14,441	62.33%	8,728	37.67%	−5,713	24.66%	23,169	5.22%
Highland	San Bernardino	7,316	50.07%	7,295	49.93%	−21	0.14%	14,611	2.21%
Loma Linda	San Bernardino	3,141	45.29%	3,795	54.71%	654	−9.43%	6,936	−3.07%
Montclair	San Bernardino	2,808	33.80%	5,499	66.20%	2,691	−32.39%	8,307	7.04%
Needles	San Bernardino	648	60.11%	430	39.89%	−218	20.22%	1,078	−1.13%
Ontario	San Bernardino	16,508	39.80%	24,966	60.20%	8,458	−20.39%	41,474	5.92%
Rancho Cucamonga	San Bernardino	33,314	52.11%	30,616	47.89%	−2,698	4.22%	63,930	1.85%
Redlands	San Bernardino	14,009	48.87%	14,658	51.13%	649	−2.26%	28,667	−2.91%
Rialto	San Bernardino	6,800	32.28%	14,266	67.72%	7,466	−35.44%	21,066	6.83%
San Bernardino	San Bernardino	13,945	37.72%	23,026	62.28%	9,081	−24.56%	36,971	6.77%
Twentynine Palms	San Bernardino	2,051	54.90%	1,685	45.10%	−366	9.80%	3,736	−6.94%
Upland	San Bernardino	14,549	49.64%	14,761	50.36%	212	−0.72%	29,310	−3.32%
Victorville	San Bernardino	11,455	45.68%	13,622	54.32%	2,167	−8.64%	25,077	1.66%
Yucaipa	San Bernardino	14,726	69.01%	6,612	30.99%	−8,114	38.03%	21,338	2.29%
Yucca Valley	San Bernardino	4,593	60.96%	2,941	39.04%	−1,652	21.93%	7,534	−4.10%
Unincorporated Area	San Bernardino	51,021	60.04%	33,959	39.96%	−17,062	20.08%	84,980	2.28%
Carlsbad	San Diego	27,278	45.85%	32,219	54.15%	4,941	−8.30%	59,497	−3.41%
Chula Vista	San Diego	31,269	37.59%	51,915	62.41%	20,646	−24.82%	83,184	0.26%
Coronado	San Diego	4,223	51.25%	4,017	48.75%	−206	2.50%	8,240	−7.57%
Del Mar	San Diego	989	39.56%	1,511	60.44%	522	−20.88%	2,500	−3.08%
El Cajon	San Diego	14,255	53.87%	12,206	46.13%	−2,049	7.74%	26,461	0.54%
Encinitas	San Diego	12,388	37.25%	20,864	62.75%	8,476	−25.49%	33,252	1.91%
Escondido	San Diego	21,510	49.12%	22,280	50.88%	770	−1.76%	43,790	−1.40%
Imperial Beach	San Diego	3,243	46.58%	3,719	53.42%	476	−6.84%	6,962	7.15%
La Mesa	San Diego	9,755	39.95%	14,660	60.05%	4,905	−20.09%	24,415	−1.68%
Lemon Grove	San Diego	3,216	38.51%	5,136	61.49%	1,920	−22.99%	8,352	1.03%
National City	San Diego	3,576	31.85%	7,652	68.15%	4,076	−36.30%	11,228	0.50%
Oceanside	San Diego	31,298	47.41%	34,714	52.59%	3,416	−5.17%	66,012	0.82%
Poway	San Diego	11,917	51.04%	11,433	48.96%	−484	2.07%	23,350	−10.55%
San Diego	San Diego	163,872	33.54%	324,705	66.46%	160,833	−32.92%	488,577	−1.30%
San Marcos	San Diego	15,212	46.37%	17,594	53.63%	2,382	−7.26%	32,806	−2.08%
Santee	San Diego	15,093	59.43%	10,303	40.57%	−4,790	18.86%	25,396	−1.78%
Solana Beach	San Diego	2,811	38.61%	4,470	61.39%	1,659	−22.79%	7,281	−3.30%
Vista	San Diego	13,522	46.95%	15,276	53.05%	1,754	−6.09%	28,798	1.57%
Unincorporated Area	San Diego	119,654	59.93%	79,996	40.07%	−39,658	19.86%	199,650	−1.24%
San Francisco	San Francisco	47,193	13.88%	292,744	86.12%	245,551	−72.23%	339,937	0.55%
Escalon	San Joaquin	2,043	68.88%	923	31.12%	−1,120	37.76%	2,966	4.45%
Lathrop	San Joaquin	2,460	36.38%	4,302	63.62%	1,842	−27.24%	6,762	−0.87%
Lodi	San Joaquin	12,604	59.66%	8,521	40.34%	−4,083	19.33%	21,125	−4.36%
Manteca	San Joaquin	12,514	50.04%	12,493	49.96%	−21	0.08%	25,007	1.01%
Ripon	San Joaquin	5,081	70.50%	2,126	29.50%	−2,955	41.00%	7,207	−0.48%
Stockton	San Joaquin	23,477	35.28%	43,063	64.72%	19,586	−29.43%	66,540	−2.95%
Tracy	San Joaquin	10,411	39.76%	15,774	60.24%	5,363	−20.48%	26,185	0.08%
Unincorporated Area	San Joaquin	26,287	59.09%	18,203	40.91%	−8,084	18.17%	44,490	−0.66%
Arroyo Grande	San Luis Obispo	4,511	46.37%	5,218	53.63%	707	−7.27%	9,729	−10.98%
Atascadero	San Luis Obispo	7,694	53.20%	6,769	46.80%	−925	6.40%	14,463	−1.53%
El Paso de Robles	San Luis Obispo	6,904	56.20%	5,381	43.80%	−1,523	12.40%	12,285	−3.21%
Grover Beach	San Luis Obispo	2,462	46.62%	2,819	53.38%	357	−6.76%	5,281	−0.68%
Morro Bay	San Luis Obispo	2,374	38.59%	3,778	61.41%	1,404	−22.82%	6,152	−4.95%
Pismo Beach	San Luis Obispo	2,432	49.38%	2,493	50.62%	61	−1.24%	4,925	−2.39%
San Luis Obispo	San Luis Obispo	5,228	26.25%	14,689	73.75%	9,461	−47.50%	19,917	−5.62%
Unincorporated Area	San Luis Obispo	29,598	52.04%	27,282	47.96%	−2,316	4.07%	56,880	−1.54%
Atherton	San Mateo	1,177	33.15%	2,374	66.85%	1,197	−33.71%	3,551	−14.79%
Belmont	San Mateo	2,585	20.89%	9,787	79.11%	7,202	−58.21%	12,372	−8.34%
Brisbane	San Mateo	439	20.87%	1,664	79.13%	1,225	−58.25%	2,103	−0.53%
Burlingame	San Mateo	3,228	23.34%	10,605	76.66%	7,377	−53.33%	13,833	−6.22%
Colma	San Mateo	95	19.67%	388	80.33%	293	−60.66%	483	2.22%
Daly City	San Mateo	5,953	20.03%	23,763	79.97%	17,810	−59.93%	29,716	−3.05%
East Palo Alto	San Mateo	582	11.45%	4,499	88.55%	3,917	−77.09%	5,081	1.84%
Foster City	San Mateo	3,008	23.69%	9,687	76.31%	6,679	−52.61%	12,695	−9.15%
Half Moon Bay	San Mateo	1,428	24.54%	4,390	75.46%	2,962	−50.91%	5,818	−6.62%
Hillsborough	San Mateo	2,109	35.72%	3,796	64.28%	1,687	−28.57%	5,905	−9.73%
Menlo Park	San Mateo	2,399	16.87%	11,822	83.13%	9,423	−66.26%	14,221	−6.40%
Millbrae	San Mateo	2,672	28.93%	6,565	71.07%	3,893	−42.15%	9,237	−8.93%
Pacifica	San Mateo	4,357	23.20%	14,427	76.80%	10,070	−53.61%	18,784	−2.60%
Portola Valley	San Mateo	638	22.07%	2,253	77.93%	1,615	−55.86%	2,891	−12.59%
Redwood City	San Mateo	5,883	19.61%	24,121	80.39%	18,238	−60.79%	30,004	−5.22%
San Bruno	San Mateo	3,995	24.85%	12,080	75.15%	8,085	−50.30%	16,075	−2.66%
San Carlos	San Mateo	3,432	21.27%	12,701	78.73%	9,269	−57.45%	16,133	−9.33%
San Mateo	San Mateo	8,568	21.82%	30,697	78.18%	22,129	−56.36%	39,265	−5.37%
South San Francisco	San Mateo	4,882	21.47%	17,858	78.53%	12,976	−57.06%	22,740	−3.12%
Woodside	San Mateo	957	30.91%	2,139	69.09%	1,182	−38.18%	3,096	−9.38%
Unincorporated Area	San Mateo	6,003	21.63%	21,752	78.37%	15,749	−56.74%	27,755	−4.73%
Buellton	Santa Barbara	1,194	49.16%	1,235	50.84%	41	−1.69%	2,429	−7.28%
Carpinteria	Santa Barbara	1,734	31.00%	3,860	69.00%	2,126	−38.01%	5,594	−5.92%
Goleta	Santa Barbara	4,302	30.13%	9,978	69.87%	5,676	−39.75%	14,280	−8.13%
Guadalupe	Santa Barbara	541	36.24%	952	63.76%	411	−27.53%	1,493	7.61%
Lompoc	Santa Barbara	5,052	47.84%	5,509	52.16%	457	−4.33%	10,561	−5.51%
Santa Barbara	Santa Barbara	8,710	22.84%	29,426	77.16%	20,716	−54.32%	38,136	−4.01%
Santa Maria	Santa Barbara	9,062	46.80%	10,300	53.20%	1,238	−6.39%	19,362	−3.47%
Solvang	Santa Barbara	1,476	49.43%	1,510	50.57%	34	−1.14%	2,986	−8.24%
Unincorporated Area	Santa Barbara	26,078	45.33%	31,449	54.67%	5,371	−9.34%	57,527	1.47%
Campbell	Santa Clara	4,644	26.58%	12,829	73.42%	8,185	−46.84%	17,473	−3.23%
Cupertino	Santa Clara	5,561	25.06%	16,627	74.94%	11,066	−49.87%	22,188	−6.46%
Gilroy	Santa Clara	6,347	33.84%	12,407	66.16%	6,060	−32.31%	18,754	−4.23%
Los Altos	Santa Clara	3,595	21.28%	13,300	78.72%	9,705	−57.44%	16,895	−13.38%
Los Altos Hills	Santa Clara	1,446	29.91%	3,389	70.09%	1,943	−40.19%	4,835	−9.35%
Los Gatos	Santa Clara	4,752	29.09%	11,583	70.91%	6,831	−41.82%	16,335	−7.32%
Milpitas	Santa Clara	6,013	28.30%	15,231	71.70%	9,218	−43.39%	21,244	−4.45%
Monte Sereno	Santa Clara	720	35.52%	1,307	64.48%	587	−28.96%	2,027	−6.97%
Morgan Hill	Santa Clara	6,929	36.30%	12,158	63.70%	5,229	−27.40%	19,087	−7.59%
Mountain View	Santa Clara	4,803	17.32%	22,929	82.68%	18,126	−65.36%	27,732	−4.49%
Palo Alto	Santa Clara	5,103	16.58%	25,677	83.42%	20,574	−66.84%	30,780	−5.51%
San Jose	Santa Clara	83,482	26.88%	227,065	73.12%	143,583	−46.24%	310,547	−3.62%
Santa Clara	Santa Clara	8,843	24.67%	26,997	75.33%	18,154	−50.65%	35,840	−5.19%
Saratoga	Santa Clara	4,737	28.98%	11,608	71.02%	6,871	−42.04%	16,345	−11.87%
Sunnyvale	Santa Clara	10,055	22.29%	35,065	77.71%	25,010	−55.43%	45,120	−5.96%
Unincorporated Area	Santa Clara	9,965	32.52%	20,679	67.48%	10,714	−34.96%	30,644	−2.99%
Capitola	Santa Cruz	1,158	22.99%	3,878	77.01%	2,720	−54.01%	5,036	−2.97%
Santa Cruz	Santa Cruz	3,496	13.28%	22,829	86.72%	19,333	−73.44%	26,325	−0.62%
Scotts Valley	Santa Cruz	1,997	30.54%	4,541	69.46%	2,544	−38.91%	6,538	−9.76%
Watsonville	Santa Cruz	2,190	19.83%	8,854	80.17%	6,664	−60.34%	11,044	−2.09%
Unincorporated Area	Santa Cruz	16,613	24.65%	50,772	75.35%	34,159	−50.69%	67,385	−4.13%
Anderson	Shasta	2,507	71.83%	983	28.17%	−1,524	43.67%	3,490	1.86%
Redding	Shasta	23,751	65.68%	12,413	34.32%	−11,338	31.35%	36,164	−4.86%
Shasta Lake	Shasta	2,562	67.51%	1,233	32.49%	−1,329	35.02%	3,795	−2.98%
Unincorporated Area	Shasta	22,788	74.10%	7,963	25.90%	−14,825	48.21%	30,751	−1.61%
Loyalton	Sierra	221	68.85%	100	31.15%	−121	37.69%	321	14.42%
Unincorporated Area	Sierra	844	62.06%	516	37.94%	−328	24.12%	1,360	−5.16%
Dorris	Siskiyou	131	71.98%	51	28.02%	−80	43.96%	182	6.14%
Dunsmuir	Siskiyou	271	42.54%	366	57.46%	95	−14.91%	637	0.49%
Etna	Siskiyou	183	66.55%	92	33.45%	−91	33.09%	275	3.89%
Fort Jones	Siskiyou	185	71.15%	75	28.85%	−110	42.31%	260	5.47%
Montague	Siskiyou	374	75.10%	124	24.90%	−250	50.20%	498	0.31%
Mt. Shasta	Siskiyou	640	41.08%	918	58.92%	278	−17.84%	1,558	4.47%
Tulelake	Siskiyou	91	73.39%	33	26.61%	−58	46.77%	124	−11.04%
Weed	Siskiyou	375	54.19%	317	45.81%	−58	8.38%	692	17.01%
Yreka	Siskiyou	1,743	66.35%	884	33.65%	−859	32.70%	2,627	4.42%
Unincorporated Area	Siskiyou	7,302	64.04%	4,101	35.96%	−3,201	28.07%	11,403	1.90%
Benicia	Solano	4,546	30.90%	10,167	69.10%	5,621	−38.20%	14,713	−7.88%
Dixon	Solano	3,877	53.39%	3,385	46.61%	−492	6.77%	7,262	4.47%
Fairfield	Solano	12,774	35.41%	23,298	64.59%	10,524	−29.17%	36,072	−3.24%
Rio Vista	Solano	2,290	40.68%	3,339	59.32%	1,049	−18.64%	5,629	−11.51%
Suisun City	Solano	2,871	32.41%	5,987	67.59%	3,116	−35.18%	8,858	−2.99%
Vacaville	Solano	18,671	51.14%	17,837	48.86%	−834	2.28%	36,508	−1.70%
Vallejo	Solano	8,487	21.79%	30,463	78.21%	21,976	−56.42%	38,950	−3.31%
Unincorporated Area	Solano	4,856	58.40%	3,459	41.60%	−1,397	16.80%	8,315	−0.49%
Cloverdale	Sonoma	1,310	34.35%	2,504	65.65%	1,194	−31.31%	3,814	1.59%
Cotati	Sonoma	939	26.62%	2,589	73.38%	1,650	−46.77%	3,528	1.00%
Healdsburg	Sonoma	1,230	22.97%	4,124	77.03%	2,894	−54.05%	5,354	−7.35%
Petaluma	Sonoma	7,345	24.78%	22,296	75.22%	14,951	−50.44%	29,641	−4.08%
Rohnert Park	Sonoma	5,439	31.16%	12,014	68.84%	6,575	−37.67%	17,453	0.47%
Santa Rosa	Sonoma	17,131	24.60%	52,502	75.40%	35,371	−50.80%	69,633	−3.62%
Sebastopol	Sonoma	626	14.27%	3,761	85.73%	3,135	−71.46%	4,387	−0.28%
Sonoma	Sonoma	1,363	22.80%	4,614	77.20%	3,251	−54.39%	5,977	−8.10%
Windsor	Sonoma	3,968	33.56%	7,855	66.44%	3,887	−32.88%	11,823	−2.81%
Unincorporated Area	Sonoma	18,068	27.21%	48,343	72.79%	30,275	−45.59%	66,411	−2.09%
Ceres	Stanislaus	4,564	44.95%	5,590	55.05%	1,026	−10.10%	10,154	11.75%
Hughson	Stanislaus	1,689	65.47%	891	34.53%	−798	30.93%	2,580	8.01%
Modesto	Stanislaus	30,464	49.70%	30,829	50.30%	365	−0.60%	61,293	4.85%
Newman	Stanislaus	1,365	50.91%	1,316	49.09%	−49	1.83%	2,681	13.12%
Oakdale	Stanislaus	5,766	67.16%	2,819	32.84%	−2,947	34.33%	8,585	5.18%
Patterson	Stanislaus	2,049	37.57%	3,405	62.43%	1,356	−24.86%	5,454	6.04%
Riverbank	Stanislaus	3,544	53.18%	3,120	46.82%	−424	6.36%	6,664	10.20%
Turlock	Stanislaus	11,949	55.65%	9,523	44.35%	−2,426	11.30%	21,472	6.25%
Waterford	Stanislaus	1,622	67.84%	769	32.16%	−853	35.68%	2,391	13.16%
Unincorporated Area	Stanislaus	19,899	64.43%	10,985	35.57%	−8,914	28.86%	30,884	8.33%
Live Oak	Sutter	1,204	54.26%	1,015	45.74%	−189	8.52%	2,219	10.25%
Yuba City	Sutter	12,535	59.53%	8,520	40.47%	−4,015	19.07%	21,055	1.56%
Unincorporated Area	Sutter	6,719	76.55%	2,058	23.45%	−4,661	53.10%	8,777	−0.21%
Corning	Tehama	1,035	67.96%	488	32.04%	−547	35.92%	1,523	5.18%
Red Bluff	Tehama	2,626	64.14%	1,468	35.86%	−1,158	28.29%	4,094	−1.36%
Tehama	Tehama	111	62.01%	68	37.99%	−43	24.02%	179	−13.87%
Unincorporated Area	Tehama	12,998	74.87%	4,362	25.13%	−8,636	49.75%	17,360	−0.26%
Unincorporated Area	Trinity	2,699	56.17%	2,106	43.83%	−593	12.34%	4,805	−3.15%
Dinuba	Tulare	1,908	46.62%	2,185	53.38%	277	−6.77%	4,093	12.18%
Exeter	Tulare	2,169	70.72%	898	29.28%	−1,271	41.44%	3,067	9.14%
Farmersville	Tulare	506	39.04%	790	60.96%	284	−21.91%	1,296	15.01%
Lindsay	Tulare	581	39.85%	877	60.15%	296	−20.30%	1,458	12.82%
Porterville	Tulare	6,094	56.45%	4,701	43.55%	−1,393	12.90%	10,795	8.57%
Tulare	Tulare	9,507	63.13%	5,553	36.87%	−3,954	26.25%	15,060	10.63%
Visalia	Tulare	25,144	61.23%	15,918	38.77%	−9,226	22.47%	41,062	6.06%
Woodlake	Tulare	418	35.91%	746	64.09%	328	−28.18%	1,164	9.79%
Unincorporated Area	Tulare	18,045	65.89%	9,341	34.11%	−8,704	31.78%	27,386	6.55%
Sonora	Tuolumne	986	51.04%	946	48.96%	−40	2.07%	1,932	−1.12%
Unincorporated Area	Tuolumne	14,846	62.51%	8,904	37.49%	−5,942	25.02%	23,750	1.78%
Camarillo	Ventura	15,625	47.51%	17,266	52.49%	1,641	−4.99%	32,891	−7.84%
Fillmore	Ventura	1,856	41.13%	2,657	58.87%	801	−17.75%	4,513	0.49%
Moorpark	Ventura	7,442	47.46%	8,240	52.54%	798	−5.09%	15,682	−4.43%
Ojai	Ventura	1,131	29.93%	2,648	70.07%	1,517	−40.14%	3,779	−2.68%
Oxnard	Ventura	13,121	29.02%	32,086	70.98%	18,965	−41.95%	45,207	0.55%
Port Hueneme	Ventura	1,986	34.16%	3,827	65.84%	1,841	−31.67%	5,813	−1.47%
San Buenaventura	Ventura	18,166	38.20%	29,389	61.80%	11,223	−23.60%	47,555	−3.90%
Santa Paula	Ventura	2,627	34.38%	5,015	65.62%	2,388	−31.25%	7,642	−2.29%
Simi Valley	Ventura	29,010	52.84%	25,887	47.16%	−3,123	5.69%	54,897	−2.43%
Thousand Oaks	Ventura	26,909	44.81%	33,147	55.19%	6,238	−10.39%	60,056	−7.89%
Unincorporated Area	Ventura	18,737	45.65%	22,308	54.35%	3,571	−8.70%	41,045	−0.89%
Davis	Yolo	4,263	15.36%	23,485	84.64%	19,222	−69.27%	27,748	−3.29%
West Sacramento	Yolo	6,958	38.33%	11,197	61.67%	4,239	−23.35%	18,155	−0.05%
Winters	Yolo	1,265	46.39%	1,462	53.61%	197	−7.22%	2,727	10.39%
Woodland	Yolo	8,333	40.22%	12,385	59.78%	4,052	−19.56%	20,718	−2.88%
Unincorporated Area	Yolo	3,950	50.22%	3,915	49.78%	−35	0.45%	7,865	2.76%
Marysville	Yuba	2,049	63.67%	1,169	36.33%	−880	27.35%	3,218	6.07%
Wheatland	Yuba	929	72.30%	356	27.70%	−573	44.59%	1,285	6.04%
Unincorporated Area	Yuba	12,313	65.67%	6,436	34.33%	−5,877	31.35%	18,749	2.61%
Totals		7,944,092	61.88%	4,894,474	38.12%	3,049,618	23.75%	12,838,566	−0.15%

== Aftermath ==
=== Turnout and participation ===
The number of valid votes cast on the recall question (question 1) was vastly greater than the number cast on the replacement question (question 2). The Newsom campaign's official message to voters had been to vote "no" on the recall and to ignore the replacement question. In the end, the No vote was similar to Newsom's vote share in 2018, and only Merced County voted Yes after backing Newsom in that election.

=== Commentary after election ===
In an October 2021 interview with Chuck Todd at the Milken Institute Global Conference, Newsom commented on the personal impact of the recall, saying "it's hard", and that it was the result of "personal stupidity", which "took a life of its own" and was "weaponized" by opponents, and, "I mean, we colored it in. I took responsibility."

Recall candidate Larry Elder's support for the Trump administration, being unpopular among California's electorate, as well as his status as a front-runner and likely gubernatorial replacement if the recall was successful, were reported to have helped Newsom defeat it. Mid-summer polling conducted two months prior to election day suggested a close race. Newsom ultimately defeated the recall with a margin of roughly 24 percent after mobilizing Democrats to vote with a message that framed the race as a referendum on him versus Elder and their pandemic policy proposals. Newsom's campaigning had also invoked Elder's connections to the inner circle of former president Donald Trump, as well as his history of provocative right-wing rhetoric as a radio talk show host. Exit polling suggested the result fell along partisan lines, with 94 percent of self-reported Democrats saying they voted against the recall and 89 percent of self-reported Republicans saying they voted to remove Newsom from office.

The recall was widely invoked following the victory of Republican Glenn Youngkin two months later in the 2021 Virginia gubernatorial election (where Democrat Joe Biden had won in 2020 by 10 points); Virginia's race featured similar campaigning on education, the pandemic, and former president Trump.

== See also ==
- 1921 North Dakota gubernatorial recall election
- 2003 California gubernatorial recall election
- 2012 Wisconsin gubernatorial recall election
- 2021 United States gubernatorial elections
- 2022 California gubernatorial election
