= 2016 United States presidential election in California =

- November 8, 2016
- Turnout: 75.27% (of registered voters) ▲2.91 pp 58.74% (of eligible voters) ▲3.27 pp
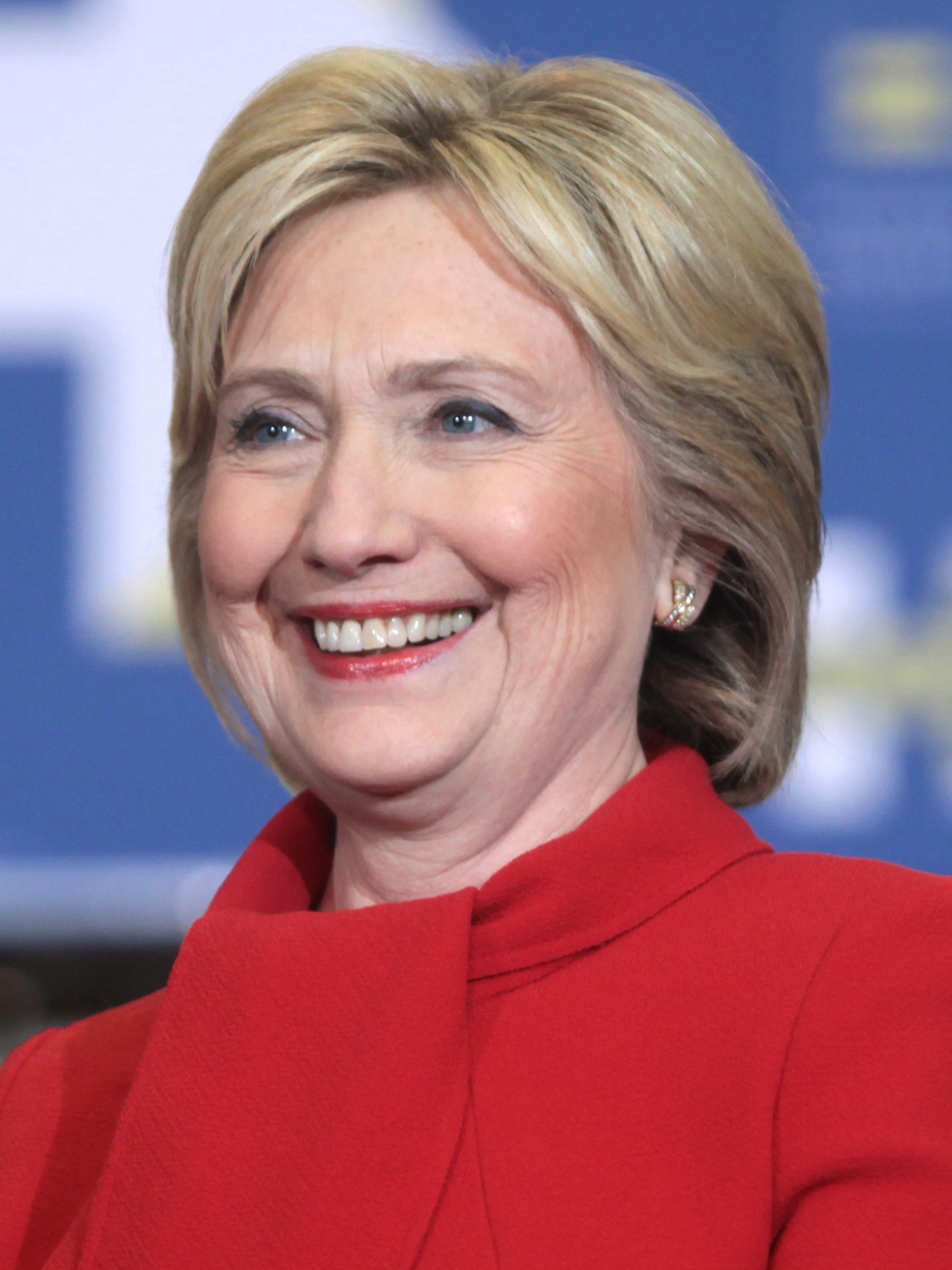

Nominee	Hillary Clinton	Donald Trump
Party	Democratic	Republican
Alliance		American Independent
Home state	New York	New York
Running mate	Tim Kaine	Mike Pence
Electoral vote	55	0
Popular vote	8,753,792	4,483,814
Percentage	61.73%	31.62%

Clinton
40–50%
50–60%
60–70%
70–80%
80–90%
Trump
40–50%
50–60%
60–70%
70–80%
President before election
Barack Obama
Democratic
Elected President
Donald Trump
Republican

Treemap of the popular vote by county

The 2016 United States presidential election in California was held on Tuesday, November 8, 2016, as part of the 2016 United States presidential election in which all 50 states plus the District of Columbia participated. California voters chose electors to represent them in the Electoral College via a popular vote, pitting the Republican Party's nominee, businessman Donald Trump, and running mate Indiana Governor Mike Pence against Democratic Party nominee, former Secretary of State Hillary Clinton, and her running mate Virginia Senator Tim Kaine. California had 55 electoral votes in the Electoral College, the most of any state.

Clinton won the state with 61.73 percent of the vote, a 30.11 percent margin, and a vote difference of 4,269,978. Despite being the largest state by population in the country, California only delivered Trump his third largest vote count, behind Florida and Texas. Even though Clinton lost the presidency, her victory margin in California was the largest of any Democrat since 1936. This was only the fourth time in U.S. history that a Republican was elected president without carrying California. She also was the first Democrat to win Orange County since that same year, making Trump the first ever Republican to win the presidency without winning the county. Trump's 31.62% vote share remains the worst performance by a Republican presidential nominee since 1856. The state was one of 11 (along with the District of Columbia) that shifted towards Clinton and Kaine from the 2012 campaign of Obama and Biden.

The 2016 election marked the first time since 1940 in California (Note: In 1940 Wendell Willkie was nominated by the Republican and Townsend Party.) that a presidential candidate appeared as a candidate for more than one party as Donald Trump was nominated not only by the Republican Party but the American Independent Party as well.

== Primary elections ==
On June 7, 2016, in the presidential primaries, California voters expressed their preferences for the Democratic, Republican, Green, and Libertarian, Peace and Freedom, and American Independent parties' respective nominees for president.

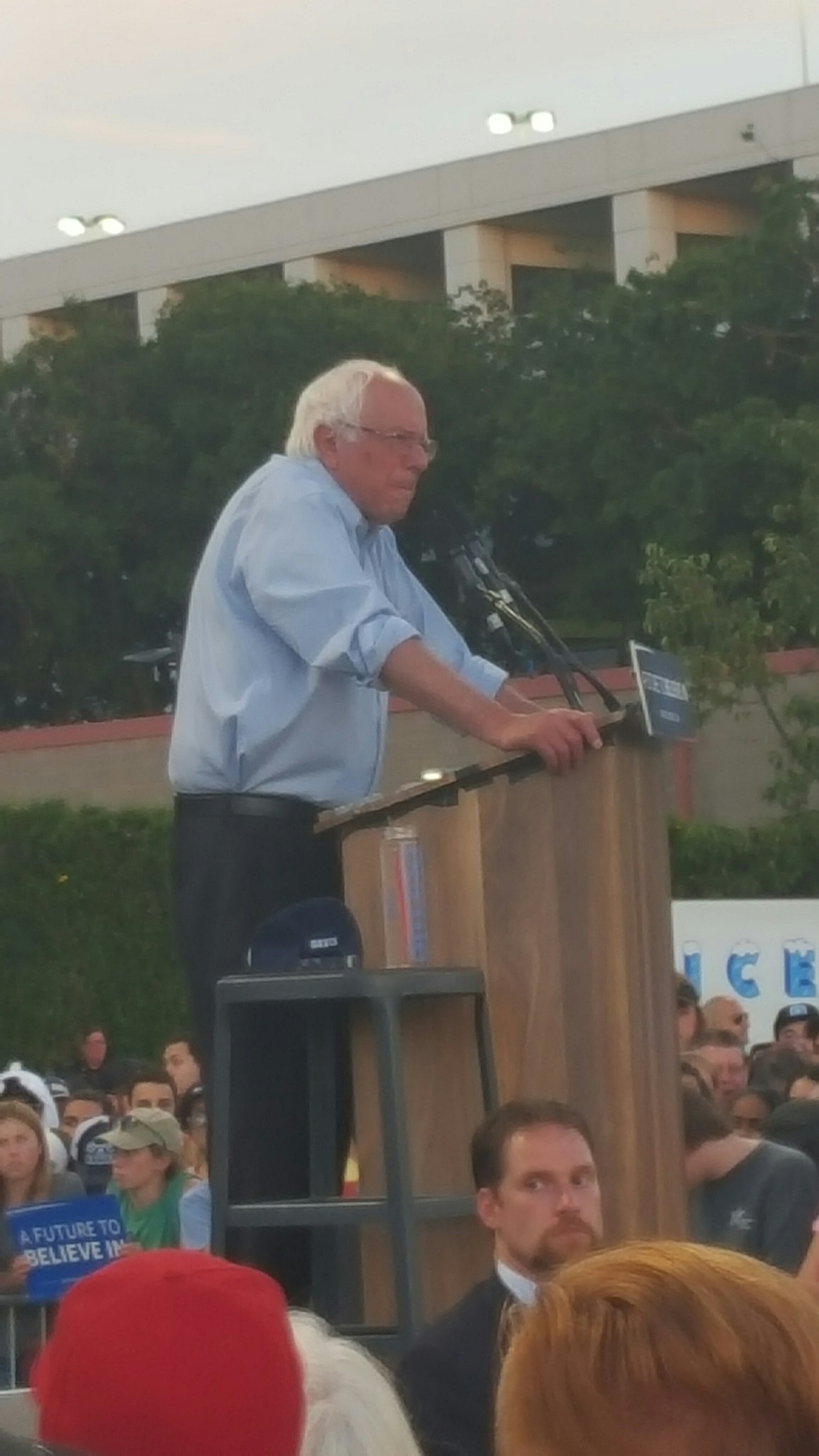
Sanders at a rally at UC Davis

While California has had a top-two candidates open primary system since 2011, presidential primaries are still partisan races. Registered members of each party may only vote in their party's presidential primary. Unaffiliated voters may choose any one primary in which to vote, if the party allows such voters to participate. For 2016, the American Independent, Democratic, and Libertarian parties have chosen to allow voters registered with no party preference to request their respective party's presidential ballots.

=== Democratic primary ===
Democratic primary results by county. Hillary Clinton Bernie Sanders

Seven candidates appeared on the Democratic presidential primary ballot:

- Hillary Clinton
- Bernie Sanders
- Rocky De La Fuente
- Henry Hewes
- Keith Judd
- Michael Steinberg
- Willie L. Wilson

==== Results ====
2016 Democratic Party's presidential nominating process in California – Summary of results –
Candidate	Popular vote		Estimated delegates		
Candidate	Count	Percentage	Pledged	Unpledged	Total
Hillary Clinton	2,745,302	53.07%	254	66	320
Bernie Sanders	2,381,722	46.04%	221	0	221
Willie Wilson	12,014	0.23%			
Michael Steinberg	10,880	0.21%			
Rocky De La Fuente	8,453	0.16%			
Henry Hewes	7,743	0.15%			
Keith Judd	7,201	0.14%			
Write-in	23	0.00%			
Uncommitted	—N/a			10	10
Total	5,173,338	100%	475	76	551

=== Republican primary ===
Republican primary results by county. Donald Trump: 50–60%; 60–70%; 70–80%; 80–90%

Five candidates appeared on the Republican presidential primary ballot, four of whom had suspended their campaigns prior to the primary:

- Donald Trump
- Ben Carson (withdrawn)
- Ted Cruz (withdrawn)
- John Kasich (withdrawn)
- Jim Gilmore (withdrawn)

Donald Trump, the only candidate with an active campaign, won each Congressional district by substantial margins, as well as all the statewide delegates, to capture all 172 votes.

California Republican primary, June 7, 2016
Candidate	Votes	Percentage	Actual delegate count		
Candidate	Votes	Percentage	Bound	Unbound	Total
Donald Trump	1,665,135	74.76%	172	0	172
John Kasich (withdrawn)	252,544	11.34%	0	0	0
Ted Cruz (withdrawn)	211,576	9.50%	0	0	0
Ben Carson (withdrawn)	82,259	3.69%	0	0	0
Jim Gilmore (withdrawn)	15,691	0.70%	0	0	0
Write-ins	101	0.00%	0	0	0
Unprojected delegates:			0	0	0
Total:	2,227,306	100.00%	172	0	172
Source: The Green Papers

=== Libertarian primary ===
Libertarian primary results by county. Gary Johnson Tie

Twelve candidates appeared on the Libertarian presidential primary ballot:

- Marc Feldman
- John Hale
- Cecil Ince
- Gary Johnson
- Steve Kerbel
- John McAfee
- Darryl Perry
- Austin Petersen
- Derrick M. Reid
- Jack Robinson Jr.
- Rhett Smith
- Joy Waymire

The primary took place after Gary Johnson won the Libertarian nomination at the Party's 2016 convention.

California Libertarian presidential primary, June 7, 2016
Candidate	Votes	Percentage
Gary Johnson	19,294	62%
John McAfee	3,139	10%
Austin Petersen	1,853	6%
Rhett Smith	1,531	5%
Joy Waymire	923	3%
John David Hale	873	3%
Marc Allan Feldman	867	3%
Jack Robinson Jr.	739	2%
Steve Kerbel	556	2%
Darryl Perry	521	2%
Derrick Michael Reid	462	1%
Cecil Ince	417	1%
Total	31,175	100%

=== Green primary ===
Green Party of California presidential primary, June 7, 2016
Candidate	Votes	Percentage	National delegates
Jill Stein	11,207	76.2%	40
Darryl Cherney	1,475	10%	5
Sedinam Kinamo Christin Moyowasifza Curry	839	5.7%	3
William Kreml	595	4.2%	2
Kent Mesplay	584	4.0%	2
Total	14,700	100%	50

=== Other parties ===
==== American Independent ====
AIP primary Alan Spears Arthur Harris Robert Ornelas Wiley Drake J. R. Myers James Hedges Tom Hoefling

California American Independent presidential primary, June 7, 2016
Candidate	Votes	Percentage
Alan Spears	7,348	19%
Arthur Harris	6,510	17%
Robert Ornelas	6,411	17%
J. R. Myers	4,898	13%
Wiley Drake	4,828	13%
James Hedges	3,989	11%
Thomas Hoefling	3,917	10%
Total	37,901	100%

The American Independent Party, a far-right and paleoconservative political party that formed when endorsing the candidacy of George Wallace in 1968 held a small presidential primary on June 7. It was won by attorney Alan Spears.

The American Independent Party nullified the results of this primary when they endorsed Donald Trump in August. The party indicated that Trump was a popular write-in choice during the primary, but was not allowed on the ballot because there was no evidence that Trump wanted the American Independent endorsement.

==== Peace and Freedom ====
California Peace and Freedom presidential primary, June 7, 2016
Candidate	Votes	Percentage
Gloria Estela La Riva	2,232	49%
Monica Moorehead	1,369	30%
Lynn Sandra Kahn	963	21%
Total	4,564	100%

== General election ==
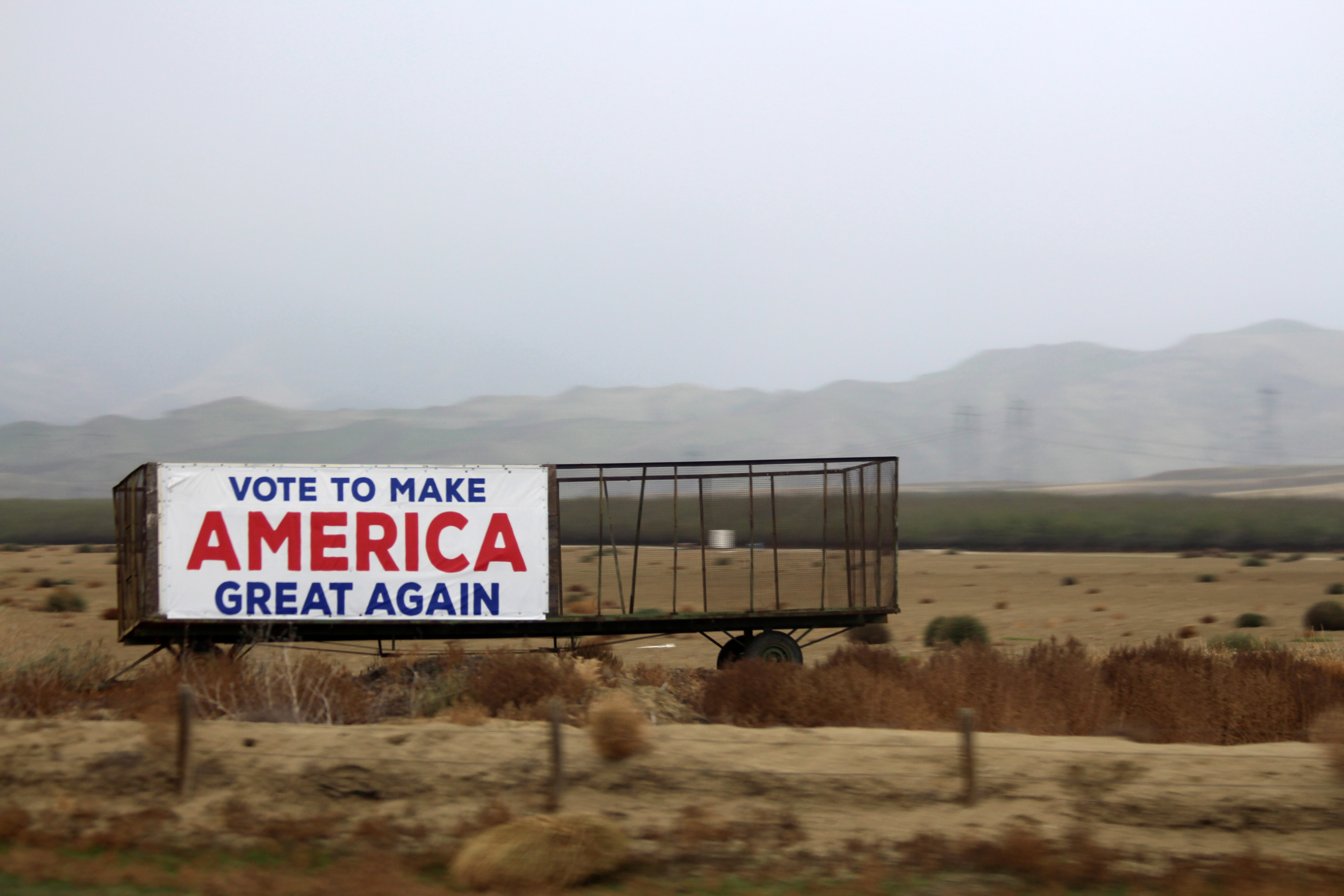
Banner displaying "Vote To Make America Great Again" on a roadside in California shortly after the November 2016 election

=== Polling ===
Democrat Hillary Clinton won every pre-election poll by double digits. The average of the last three pre-election polls showed Hillary Clinton leading Donald Trump 54.3% to 32%.

=== Predictions ===
Source	Ranking	As of
Los Angeles Times	Safe D	November 6, 2016
CNN	Safe D	November 4, 2016
Cook Political Report	Safe D	November 7, 2016
Electoral-vote.com	Safe D	November 8, 2016
Rothenberg Political Report	Safe D	November 7, 2016
Sabato's Crystal Ball	Safe D	November 7, 2016
RealClearPolitics	Safe D	November 8, 2016
Fox News	Safe D	November 7, 2016

=== Results ===
2016 U.S. presidential election in California
Party	Presidential candidate	Popular vote		Electoral vote
Party	Presidential candidate	Count	Percentage	Electoral vote
Democratic	Hillary Clinton	8,753,788	61.73%	55
Republican/American Independent	Donald Trump	4,483,810	31.62%	0
Libertarian	Gary Johnson	478,500	3.37%	0
Green	Jill Stein	278,657	1.96%	0
Independent	Bernie Sanders (write-in)	79,341	0.56%	0
Peace and Freedom	Gloria La Riva	66,101	0.47%	0
Independent	Evan McMullin (write-in)	39,596	0.28%	0
American Solidarity	Mike Maturen (write-in)	1,316	0.01%	0
Independent	Laurence Kotlikoff (write-in)	402	0.00%	0
Socialist Equality	Jerry White (write-in)	84	0.00%	0
Date	November 8, 2016	Total voters	Registered: 19,411,771; Eligible: 24,875,293	
Turnout %	Registered: 75.27% VAP: 58.74%	Turnout votes	Valid votes: 14,181,595; Invalid votes: 428,924	

Swing by Census Block Group Clinton: >50%; 40-50%; 30-40%; 20-30%; 15-20%; 10-15%; 5-10%; 1-5%; Trump: 1-5%; 5-10%; 10-15%; 15-20%; 20-30%; 30-40%; 40-50%; >50%

Below is an official list of California's Recognized Write-in Candidates.

- Laurence Kotlikoff for president and Edward Leamer for vice president
- Mike Maturen for president and Juan Muñoz for vice president
- Evan McMullin for president and Nathan Johnson for vice president
- Bernie Sanders for president and Tulsi Gabbard for vice president
- Jerry White for president and Niles Niemuth for vice president

California law only requires that 55 electors sign on to declare a person a write-in candidate, not that the persons consent, according to a statement from the Secretary of State's Office.

==== By county ====
County	Hillary Clinton Democratic		Donald Trump Republican		Various candidates Other parties		Margin		Total votes cast
County	#	%	#	%	#	%	#	%	Total votes cast
Alameda	514,842	78.69%	95,922	14.66%	43,502	6.65%	418,920	64.03%	654,266
Alpine	334	55.48%	217	36.05%	51	8.47%	117	19.44%	602
Amador	6,004	33.86%	10,485	59.12%	1,245	7.02%	-4,481	-25.27%	17,734
Butte	41,567	43.50%	45,144	47.24%	8,853	9.26%	-3,577	-3.74%	95,564
Calaveras	7,944	34.34%	13,511	58.40%	1,681	7.27%	-5,567	-24.06%	23,136
Colusa	2,661	40.12%	3,551	53.54%	420	6.33%	-890	-13.42%	6,632
Contra Costa	319,287	68.49%	115,956	24.87%	30,932	6.64%	203,331	43.62%	466,175
Del Norte	3,485	36.46%	5,134	53.71%	939	9.82%	-1,649	-17.25%	9,558
El Dorado	36,404	38.90%	49,247	52.62%	7,940	8.48%	-12,843	-13.72%	93,591
Fresno	141,341	50.06%	124,049	43.94%	16,929	6.00%	17,292	6.12%	282,319
Glenn	3,065	32.37%	5,788	61.12%	617	6.52%	-2,723	-28.75%	9,470
Humboldt	33,200	56.04%	18,373	31.01%	7,673	12.95%	14,827	25.03%	59,246
Imperial	32,667	67.93%	12,704	26.42%	2,720	5.66%	19,963	41.51%	48,091
Inyo	3,155	39.02%	4,248	52.54%	683	8.45%	-1,093	-13.52%	8,086
Kern	98,689	40.42%	129,584	53.07%	15,890	6.51%	-30,895	-12.65%	244,163
Kings	13,617	40.15%	18,093	53.35%	2,205	6.50%	-4,476	-13.20%	33,915
Lake	11,496	46.93%	10,599	43.27%	2,401	9.80%	897	3.66%	24,496
Lassen	2,224	21.13%	7,574	71.97%	726	6.90%	-5,350	-50.84%	10,524
Los Angeles	2,464,364	71.76%	769,743	22.41%	200,201	5.83%	1,694,621	49.34%	3,434,308
Madera	17,029	39.50%	23,357	54.18%	2,726	6.32%	-6,328	-14.68%	43,112
Marin	108,707	78.05%	21,771	15.63%	8,795	6.31%	86,936	62.42%	139,273
Mariposa	3,122	35.17%	5,185	58.41%	570	6.42%	-2,063	-23.24%	8,877
Mendocino	22,079	58.91%	10,888	29.05%	4,510	12.03%	11,191	29.86%	37,477
Merced	37,317	52.72%	28,725	40.58%	4,747	6.71%	8,592	12.14%	70,789
Modoc	877	23.15%	2,696	71.17%	215	5.68%	-1,819	-48.02%	3,788
Mono	2,773	52.56%	2,111	40.01%	392	7.43%	662	12.55%	5,276
Monterey	89,088	66.78%	34,895	26.16%	9,425	7.06%	54,193	40.62%	133,408
Napa	39,199	63.87%	17,411	28.37%	4,762	7.76%	21,788	35.50%	61,372
Nevada	26,053	47.43%	23,365	42.53%	5,517	10.04%	2,688	4.89%	54,935
Orange	609,961	50.94%	507,148	42.35%	80,412	6.71%	102,813	8.59%	1,197,521
Placer	73,509	40.20%	95,138	52.03%	14,192	7.76%	-21,629	-11.83%	182,839
Plumas	3,459	35.75%	5,420	56.01%	797	8.24%	-1,961	-20.27%	9,676
Riverside	373,695	49.73%	333,243	44.35%	44,453	5.92%	40,452	5.38%	751,391
Sacramento	326,023	58.29%	189,789	33.93%	43,518	7.78%	136,234	24.36%	559,330
San Benito	12,521	57.11%	7,841	35.76%	1,562	7.12%	4,680	21.35%	21,924
San Bernardino	340,833	52.12%	271,240	41.48%	41,910	6.41%	69,593	10.64%	653,983
San Diego	735,476	56.30%	477,766	36.57%	93,158	7.13%	257,710	19.73%	1,306,400
San Francisco	345,084	85.04%	37,688	9.29%	23,020	5.67%	307,396	75.75%	405,792
San Joaquin	121,124	54.03%	88,936	39.67%	14,106	6.29%	32,188	14.36%	224,166
San Luis Obispo	67,107	49.71%	56,164	41.60%	11,738	8.69%	10,943	8.11%	135,009
San Mateo	237,882	75.67%	57,929	18.43%	18,573	5.91%	179,953	57.24%	314,384
Santa Barbara	107,142	60.61%	56,365	31.88%	13,279	7.51%	50,777	28.72%	176,786
Santa Clara	511,684	72.71%	144,826	20.58%	47,199	6.71%	366,858	52.13%	703,709
Santa Cruz	95,249	73.94%	22,438	17.42%	11,134	8.64%	72,811	56.52%	128,821
Shasta	22,301	27.86%	51,778	64.68%	5,974	7.46%	-29,477	-36.82%	80,053
Sierra	601	32.84%	1,048	57.27%	181	9.89%	-447	-24.43%	1,830
Siskiyou	7,234	35.30%	11,341	55.34%	1,917	9.35%	-4,107	-20.04%	20,492
Solano	102,360	61.62%	51,920	31.26%	11,833	7.12%	50,440	30.36%	166,113
Sonoma	160,435	69.38%	51,408	22.23%	19,410	8.39%	109,027	47.15%	231,253
Stanislaus	81,647	47.43%	78,494	45.60%	12,005	6.97%	3,153	1.83%	172,146
Sutter	13,076	39.01%	18,176	54.22%	2,271	6.77%	-5,100	-15.21%	33,523
Tehama	6,809	28.48%	15,494	64.81%	1,605	6.71%	-8,685	-36.33%	23,908
Trinity	2,214	38.94%	2,812	49.45%	660	11.61%	-598	-10.52%	5,686
Tulare	47,585	42.36%	58,299	51.90%	6,450	5.74%	-10,714	-9.54%	112,334
Tuolumne	9,123	35.74%	14,551	57.00%	1,855	7.27%	-5,428	-21.26%	25,529
Ventura	194,402	55.27%	132,323	37.62%	25,001	7.11%	62,079	17.65%	351,726
Yolo	54,752	66.70%	20,739	25.26%	6,599	8.04%	34,013	41.43%	82,090
Yuba	7,910	34.39%	13,170	57.27%	1,918	8.34%	-5,260	-22.87%	22,998
Total	8,753,788	61.73%	4,483,810	31.62%	943,997	6.66%	4,269,978	30.11%	14,181,595

Counties that flipped from Republican to Democratic

- Nevada (largest town: Truckee)
- Orange (largest city: Anaheim)

==== By congressional district ====
Clinton won 46 of the 53 congressional districts, including seven held by Republicans.

District	Clinton	Trump	Representative
1st	37%	56%	Doug LaMalfa
2nd	69%	23%	Jared Huffman
3rd	53%	40%	John Garamendi
4th	39%	54%	Tom McClintock
5th	69%	24%	Mike Thompson
6th	69%	24%	Doris Matsui
7th	52%	41%	Ami Bera
8th	40%	55%	Paul Cook
9th	57%	38%	Jerry McNerney
10th	49%	46%	Jeff Denham
11th	72%	23%	Mark DeSaulnier
12th	86%	9%	Nancy Pelosi
13th	87%	7%	Barbara Lee
14th	77%	18%	Jackie Speier
15th	70%	24%	Eric Swalwell
16th	58%	36%	Jim Costa
17th	74%	20%	Mike Honda
17th	74%	20%	Ro Khanna
18th	73%	20%	Anna Eshoo
19th	73%	21%	Zoe Lofgren
20th	70%	23%	Sam Farr
20th	70%	23%	Jimmy Panetta
21st	55%	40%	David Valadao
22nd	43%	52%	Devin Nunes
23rd	36%	58%	Kevin McCarthy
24th	57%	36%	Lois Capps
24th	57%	36%	Salud Carbajal
25th	50%	44%	Steve Knight
26th	58%	36%	Julia Brownley
27th	66%	28%	Judy Chu
28th	72%	22%	Adam Schiff
29th	78%	17%	Tony Cárdenas
30th	69%	26%	Brad Sherman
31st	58%	37%	Pete Aguilar
32nd	67%	28%	Grace Napolitano
33rd	68%	26%	Ted Lieu
34th	84%	11%	Xavier Becerra
35th	68%	27%	Norma Torres
36th	52%	43%	Raul Ruiz
37th	86%	10%	Karen Bass
38th	67%	27%	Linda Sánchez
39th	51%	43%	Ed Royce
40th	82%	13%	Lucille Roybal-Allard
41st	61%	33%	Mark Takano
42nd	41%	53%	Ken Calvert
43rd	78%	17%	Maxine Waters
44th	83%	12%	Janice Hahn
44th	83%	12%	Nanette Barragán
45th	50%	44%	Mimi Walters
46th	66%	28%	Loretta Sánchez
46th	66%	28%	Lou Correa
47th	63%	31%	Alan Lowenthal
48th	48%	46%	Dana Rohrabacher
49th	51%	43%	Darrell Issa
50th	40%	55%	Duncan Hunter
51st	72%	23%	Juan Vargas
52nd	58%	36%	Scott Peters
53rd	65%	30%	Susan Davis

==== By city ====
Official winners by city

By municipality

Official outcome by city and unincorporated areas of counties, of which Clinton won 388 and Trump won 150.
City	County	Hillary Clinton Democratic		Donald Trump Republican		Various candidates Other parties		Margin		Total Votes	2012 to 2016 Swing %
City	County	#	%	#	%	#	%	#	%	Total Votes	2012 to 2016 Swing %
Alameda	Alameda	30,696	80.85%	5,129	13.51%	2,141	5.64%	25,567	67.34%	37,966	7.19%
Albany	Alameda	8,128	88.04%	587	6.36%	517	5.60%	7,541	81.68%	9,232	2.05%
Berkeley	Alameda	57,750	90.36%	2,031	3.18%	4,129	6.46%	55,719	87.18%	63,910	1.48%
Dublin	Alameda	14,312	69.16%	5,089	24.59%	1,293	6.25%	9,223	44.57%	20,694	11.85%
Emeryville	Alameda	4,751	88.44%	322	5.99%	299	5.57%	4,429	82.45%	5,372	4.36%
Fremont	Alameda	54,914	73.22%	16,081	21.44%	4,008	5.34%	38,833	51.78%	75,003	4.15%
Hayward	Alameda	37,640	79.53%	7,228	15.27%	2,461	5.20%	30,412	64.26%	47,329	0.67%
Livermore	Alameda	22,476	57.06%	13,837	35.13%	3,080	7.82%	8,639	21.93%	39,393	9.56%
Newark	Alameda	11,565	73.61%	3,290	20.94%	857	5.45%	8,275	52.67%	15,712	1.60%
Oakland	Alameda	158,926	89.37%	8,470	4.76%	10,434	5.87%	150,456	84.61%	177,830	0.06%
Piedmont	Alameda	6,013	83.51%	823	11.43%	364	5.06%	5,190	72.08%	7,200	20.67%
Pleasanton	Alameda	21,897	63.13%	10,537	30.38%	2,249	6.48%	11,360	32.75%	34,683	14.83%
San Leandro	Alameda	25,291	78.53%	5,301	16.46%	1,613	5.01%	19,990	62.07%	32,205	2.84%
Union City	Alameda	19,835	78.85%	4,218	16.77%	1,101	4.38%	15,617	62.09%	25,154	2.01%
Unincorporated Area	Alameda	40,648	71.34%	12,979	22.78%	3,352	5.88%	27,669	48.56%	56,979	3.17%
Unincorporated Area	Alpine	334	55.67%	217	36.17%	49	8.17%	117	19.50%	600	-4.15%
Amador	Amador	66	54.10%	47	38.52%	9	7.38%	19	15.57%	122	8.37%
Ione	Amador	612	30.40%	1,280	63.59%	121	6.01%	-668	-33.18%	2,013	-0.32%
Jackson	Amador	839	39.52%	1,151	54.22%	133	6.26%	-312	-14.70%	2,123	-1.27%
Plymouth	Amador	134	30.11%	273	61.35%	38	8.54%	-139	-31.24%	445	-9.55%
Sutter Creek	Amador	542	38.85%	767	54.98%	86	6.16%	-225	-16.13%	1,395	-7.87%
Unincorporated Area	Amador	3,811	33.21%	6,967	60.70%	699	6.09%	-3,156	-27.50%	11,477	-7.40%
Biggs	Butte	214	36.46%	346	58.94%	27	4.60%	-132	-22.49%	587	-12.29%
Chico	Butte	20,822	56.44%	12,510	33.91%	3,561	9.65%	8,312	22.53%	36,893	3.10%
Gridley	Butte	923	45.31%	981	48.16%	133	6.53%	-58	-2.85%	2,037	0.80%
Oroville	Butte	1,982	37.70%	2,883	54.84%	392	7.46%	-901	-17.14%	5,257	-9.26%
Paradise	Butte	4,951	37.83%	7,124	54.44%	1,012	7.73%	-2,173	-16.60%	13,087	-3.51%
Unincorporated Area	Butte	12,675	34.66%	21,300	58.24%	2,595	7.10%	-8,625	-23.58%	36,570	-5.60%
Angels	Calaveras	676	36.74%	1,025	55.71%	139	7.55%	-349	-18.97%	1,840	-4.89%
Unincorporated Area	Calaveras	7,268	34.28%	12,486	58.90%	1,445	6.82%	-5,218	-24.61%	21,199	-7.33%
Colusa	Colusa	949	35.85%	1,532	57.88%	166	6.27%	-583	-22.02%	2,647	-2.95%
Williams	Colusa	675	65.22%	297	28.70%	63	6.09%	378	36.52%	1,035	15.83%
Unincorporated Area	Colusa	1,037	35.59%	1,722	59.09%	155	5.32%	-685	-23.51%	2,914	9.51%
Antioch	Contra Costa	25,185	69.72%	9,047	25.04%	1,891	5.23%	16,138	44.68%	36,123	1.07%
Brentwood	Contra Costa	13,115	53.96%	9,820	40.40%	1,369	5.63%	3,295	13.56%	24,304	3.21%
Clayton	Contra Costa	3,500	54.90%	2,479	38.89%	396	6.21%	1,021	16.02%	6,375	13.02%
Concord	Contra Costa	32,019	66.13%	13,318	27.51%	3,082	6.37%	18,701	38.62%	48,419	4.43%
Danville	Contra Costa	13,969	58.85%	8,360	35.22%	1,408	5.93%	5,609	23.63%	23,737	22.16%
El Cerrito	Contra Costa	11,445	86.71%	1,031	7.81%	723	5.48%	10,414	78.90%	13,199	4.97%
Hercules	Contra Costa	8,533	80.24%	1,684	15.83%	418	3.93%	6,849	64.40%	10,635	4.15%
Lafayette	Contra Costa	10,581	72.25%	3,106	21.21%	957	6.54%	7,475	51.04%	14,644	24.70%
Martinez	Contra Costa	12,230	65.56%	5,114	27.42%	1,310	7.02%	7,116	38.15%	18,654	3.61%
Moraga	Contra Costa	6,071	69.55%	2,071	23.73%	587	6.72%	4,000	45.82%	8,729	26.15%
Oakley	Contra Costa	7,849	56.34%	5,189	37.25%	894	6.42%	2,660	19.09%	13,932	-4.54%
Orinda	Contra Costa	8,557	74.24%	2,295	19.91%	674	5.85%	6,262	54.33%	11,526	26.26%
Pinole	Contra Costa	6,301	75.18%	1,707	20.37%	373	4.45%	4,594	54.81%	8,381	4.56%
Pittsburg	Contra Costa	16,802	77.20%	3,950	18.15%	1,011	4.65%	12,852	59.05%	21,763	-2.52%
Pleasant Hill	Contra Costa	11,592	69.65%	3,901	23.44%	1,151	6.92%	7,691	46.21%	16,644	9.79%
Richmond	Contra Costa	31,307	87.15%	2,899	8.07%	1,718	4.78%	28,408	79.08%	35,924	-0.73%
San Pablo	Contra Costa	6,035	87.59%	557	8.08%	298	4.33%	5,478	79.51%	6,890	1.76%
San Ramon	Contra Costa	21,134	66.92%	8,741	27.68%	1,708	5.41%	12,393	39.24%	31,583	17.22%
Walnut Creek	Contra Costa	25,812	69.81%	9,106	24.63%	2,057	5.56%	16,706	45.18%	36,975	17.16%
Unincorporated Area	Contra Costa	47,250	64.61%	21,581	29.51%	4,301	5.88%	25,669	35.10%	73,132	9.71%
Crescent City	Del Norte	498	44.03%	515	45.53%	118	10.43%	-17	-1.50%	1,131	-12.76%
Unincorporated Area	Del Norte	2,987	36.29%	4,619	56.12%	624	7.58%	-1,632	-19.83%	8,230	-7.42%
Placerville	El Dorado (Note: 2012's city results in El Dorado county are missing 68 overseas votes, as they were put on their own county-wide line item rather than being included in the city results.)	2,078	45.81%	2,081	45.88%	377	8.31%	-3	-0.07%	4,536	2.93%
South Lake Tahoe	El Dorado	4,179	59.84%	2,231	31.94%	574	8.22%	1,948	27.89%	6,984	-7.02%
Unincorporated Area	El Dorado	30,147	37.32%	44,935	55.63%	5,691	7.05%	-14,788	-18.31%	80,773	4.50%
Clovis	Fresno	15,718	36.94%	24,586	57.78%	2,247	5.28%	-8,868	-20.84%	42,551	3.04%
Coalinga	Fresno	1,414	44.56%	1,584	49.92%	175	5.52%	-170	-5.36%	3,173	4.76%
Firebaugh	Fresno	1,001	70.20%	347	24.33%	78	5.47%	654	45.86%	1,426	10.19%
Fowler	Fresno	1,112	57.14%	739	37.98%	95	4.88%	373	19.17%	1,946	4.98%
Fresno	Fresno	81,220	57.22%	53,026	37.35%	7,707	5.43%	28,194	19.86%	141,953	4.41%
Huron	Fresno	548	88.10%	47	7.56%	27	4.34%	501	80.55%	622	-0.49%
Kerman	Fresno	2,059	60.38%	1,178	34.55%	173	5.07%	881	25.84%	3,410	4.02%
Kingsburg	Fresno	1,324	29.46%	2,929	65.18%	241	5.36%	-1,605	-35.71%	4,494	5.77%
Mendota	Fresno	1,095	81.96%	200	14.97%	41	3.07%	895	66.99%	1,336	-2.16%
Orange Cove	Fresno	1,159	81.85%	200	14.12%	57	4.03%	959	67.73%	1,416	1.54%
Parlier	Fresno	1,934	83.72%	281	12.16%	95	4.11%	1,653	71.56%	2,310	-2.37%
Reedley	Fresno	3,024	50.76%	2,589	43.46%	344	5.77%	435	7.30%	5,957	8.04%
San Joaquin	Fresno	497	85.69%	66	11.38%	17	2.93%	431	74.31%	580	9.24%
Sanger	Fresno	4,182	63.22%	2,112	31.93%	321	4.85%	2,070	31.29%	6,615	1.86%
Selma	Fresno	3,343	59.43%	2,059	36.60%	223	3.96%	1,284	22.83%	5,625	1.99%
Unincorporated Area	Fresno	21,711	38.50%	32,106	56.93%	2,580	4.57%	-10,395	-18.43%	56,397	2.93%
Orland	Glenn	953	42.58%	1,136	50.76%	149	6.66%	-183	-8.18%	2,238	-0.49%
Willows & Unincorporated Area (Note: From California's Supplement to the Statement of Vote: Glenn County is unable to provide jurisdictional breakdowns for the City of Willows. Therefore, these vote totals are combined in a line item identified as Willows and Unincorporated area of Glenn County.)	Glenn	2,112	29.58%	4,652	65.14%	377	5.28%	-2,540	-35.57%	7,141	-4.99% (Note: Calculated by combining the 2012 results from Willows and the unincorporated area of Glenn County.)
Arcata	Humboldt	6,301	74.02%	1,031	12.11%	1,181	13.87%	5,270	61.91%	8,513	-1.62%
Blue Lake	Humboldt	403	62.87%	164	25.59%	74	11.54%	239	37.29%	641	-0.37%
Eureka	Humboldt	6,237	59.95%	3,074	29.55%	1,092	10.50%	3,163	30.40%	10,403	-0.62%
Ferndale	Humboldt	403	50.50%	339	42.48%	56	7.02%	64	8.02%	798	-0.74%
Fortuna	Humboldt	1,939	41.56%	2,357	50.51%	370	7.93%	-418	-8.96%	4,666	-4.09%
Rio Dell	Humboldt	408	37.88%	555	51.53%	114	10.58%	-147	-13.65%	1,077	-10.19%
Trinidad	Humboldt	152	72.04%	38	18.01%	21	9.95%	114	54.03%	211	-2.53%
Unincorporated Area	Humboldt	17,357	55.12%	10,815	34.35%	3,315	10.53%	6,542	20.78%	31,487	-1.28%
Brawley	Imperial	4,174	62.42%	2,160	32.30%	353	5.28%	2,014	30.12%	6,687	5.37%
Calexico	Imperial	10,226	86.30%	1,159	9.78%	465	3.92%	9,067	76.51%	11,850	3.82%
Calipatria	Imperial	500	66.40%	208	27.62%	45	5.98%	292	38.78%	753	1.74%
El Centro	Imperial	8,708	68.87%	3,296	26.07%	640	5.06%	5,412	42.80%	12,644	11.74%
Holtville	Imperial	1,062	64.95%	483	29.54%	90	5.50%	579	35.41%	1,635	14.40%
Imperial	Imperial	2,962	55.43%	2,093	39.17%	289	5.41%	869	16.26%	5,344	6.54%
Westmorland	Imperial	356	72.80%	117	23.93%	16	3.27%	239	48.88%	489	17.75%
Unincorporated Area	Imperial	4,679	56.55%	3,188	38.53%	407	4.92%	1,491	18.02%	8,274	11.18%
Bishop	Inyo	637	47.05%	619	45.72%	98	7.24%	18	1.33%	1,354	3.70%
Unincorporated Area	Inyo	2,518	37.91%	3,629	54.64%	495	7.45%	-1,111	-16.73%	6,642	-3.48%
Arvin	Kern	1,933	79.91%	375	15.50%	111	4.59%	1,558	64.41%	2,419	5.07%
Bakersfield	Kern	50,390	44.05%	57,670	50.41%	6,339	5.54%	-7,280	-6.36%	114,399	6.18%
California City	Kern	1,459	38.28%	2,113	55.44%	239	6.27%	-654	-17.16%	3,811	-3.18%
Delano	Kern	5,703	75.99%	1,473	19.63%	329	4.38%	4,230	56.36%	7,505	3.69%
Maricopa	Kern	37	11.75%	260	82.54%	18	5.71%	-223	-70.79%	315	-18.35%
McFarland	Kern	1,497	76.53%	341	17.43%	118	6.03%	1,156	59.10%	1,956	5.87%
Ridgecrest	Kern	3,141	30.05%	6,314	60.42%	996	9.53%	-3,173	-30.36%	10,451	5.95%
Shafter	Kern	1,856	53.98%	1,406	40.90%	176	5.12%	450	13.09%	3,438	4.48%
Taft	Kern	364	16.91%	1,732	80.48%	56	2.60%	-1,368	-63.57%	2,152	-10.92%
Tehachapi	Kern	939	29.23%	2,048	63.76%	225	7.00%	-1,109	-34.53%	3,212	-0.70%
Wasco	Kern	2,209	61.24%	1,156	32.05%	242	6.71%	1,053	29.19%	3,607	7.81%
Unincorporated Area	Kern	29,161	32.85%	54,696	61.61%	4,919	5.54%	-25,535	-28.76%	88,776	0.11%
Avenal	Kings	713	71.59%	228	22.89%	55	5.52%	485	48.69%	996	3.87%
Corcoran	Kings	1,541	61.30%	832	33.09%	141	5.61%	709	28.20%	2,514	-1.37%
Hanford	Kings	6,334	39.79%	8,604	54.06%	979	6.15%	-2,270	-14.26%	15,917	2.05%
Lemoore	Kings	2,556	37.60%	3,797	55.86%	444	6.53%	-1,241	-18.26%	6,797	0.49%
Unincorporated Area	Kings	2,473	33.03%	4,632	61.88%	381	5.09%	-2,159	-28.84%	7,486	1.09%
Clearlake	Kings	2,083	52.51%	1,522	38.37%	362	9.13%	561	14.14%	3,967	-18.51%
Lakeport	Lake	1,004	48.32%	866	41.67%	208	10.01%	138	6.64%	2,078	-7.98%
Unincorporated Area	Lake	8,413	46.26%	8,215	45.17%	1,559	8.57%	198	1.09%	18,187	-12.82%
Susanville	Lassen	865	25.53%	2,286	67.47%	237	7.00%	-1,421	-41.94%	3,388	-9.27%
Unincorporated Area	Lassen	1,359	19.32%	5,288	75.18%	387	5.50%	-3,929	-55.86%	7,034	-12.64%
Agoura Hills	Los Angeles	6,522	59.60%	3,853	35.21%	568	5.19%	2,669	24.39%	10,943	15.96%
Alhambra	Los Angeles	18,476	72.47%	5,639	22.12%	1,381	5.42%	12,837	50.35%	25,496	5.23%
Arcadia	Los Angeles	10,379	56.93%	6,850	37.58%	1,001	5.49%	3,529	19.36%	18,230	18.23%
Artesia	Los Angeles	3,179	66.87%	1,321	27.79%	254	5.34%	1,858	39.08%	4,754	9.61%
Avalon	Los Angeles	629	52.24%	489	40.61%	86	7.14%	140	11.63%	1,204	-3.91%
Azusa	Los Angeles	8,881	67.43%	3,435	26.08%	855	6.49%	5,446	41.35%	13,171	6.54%
Baldwin Park	Los Angeles	15,085	79.72%	2,788	14.73%	1,050	5.55%	12,297	64.98%	18,923	3.38%
Bell	Los Angeles	6,553	85.82%	713	9.34%	370	4.85%	5,840	76.48%	7,636	4.93%
Bell Gardens	Los Angeles	7,457	87.37%	687	8.05%	391	4.58%	6,770	79.32%	8,535	3.32%
Bellflower	Los Angeles	15,778	69.45%	5,700	25.09%	1,239	5.45%	10,078	44.36%	22,717	5.97%
Beverly Hills	Los Angeles	9,743	63.81%	4,982	32.63%	543	3.56%	4,761	31.18%	15,268	20.76%
Bradbury	Los Angeles	180	47.12%	183	47.91%	19	4.97%	-3	-0.79%	382	16.35%
Burbank	Los Angeles	30,835	66.53%	12,718	27.44%	2,796	6.03%	18,117	39.09%	46,349	8.05%
Calabasas	Los Angeles	7,333	62.49%	3,778	32.19%	624	5.32%	3,555	30.29%	11,735	18.69%
Carson	Los Angeles	28,992	79.34%	6,043	16.54%	1,508	4.13%	22,949	62.80%	36,543	0.62%
Cerritos	Los Angeles	13,599	63.38%	6,920	32.25%	937	4.37%	6,679	31.13%	21,456	13.76%
Claremont	Los Angeles	10,959	65.05%	4,843	28.75%	1,046	6.21%	6,116	36.30%	16,848	9.94%
Commerce	Los Angeles	3,538	83.09%	501	11.77%	219	5.14%	3,037	71.32%	4,258	0.64%
Compton	Los Angeles	23,764	91.78%	1,120	4.33%	1,009	3.90%	22,644	87.45%	25,893	-4.57%
Covina	Los Angeles	11,274	59.43%	6,537	34.46%	1,159	6.11%	4,737	24.97%	18,970	7.36%
Cudahy	Los Angeles	3,867	87.04%	331	7.45%	245	5.51%	3,536	79.59%	4,443	6.27%
Culver City	Los Angeles	17,222	80.78%	2,958	13.87%	1,140	5.35%	14,264	66.90%	21,320	8.95%
Diamond Bar	Los Angeles	11,739	58.12%	7,393	36.60%	1,066	5.28%	4,346	21.52%	20,198	9.96%
Downey	Los Angeles	27,005	69.35%	9,798	25.16%	2,135	5.48%	17,207	44.19%	38,938	11.04%
Duarte	Los Angeles	5,670	66.91%	2,341	27.63%	463	5.46%	3,329	39.28%	8,474	6.40%
El Monte	Los Angeles	17,153	77.48%	3,798	17.16%	1,187	5.36%	13,355	60.33%	22,138	1.05%
El Segundo	Los Angeles	5,118	57.66%	3,062	34.50%	696	7.84%	2,056	23.16%	8,876	19.95%
Gardena	Los Angeles	15,844	79.22%	3,229	16.15%	927	4.64%	12,615	63.08%	20,000	0.99%
Glendale	Los Angeles	40,879	62.57%	20,782	31.81%	3,675	5.62%	20,097	30.76%	65,336	-0.79%
Glendora	Los Angeles	10,004	43.44%	11,467	49.80%	1,556	6.76%	-1,463	-6.35%	23,027	8.17%
Hawaiian Gardens	Los Angeles	2,322	78.53%	467	15.79%	168	5.68%	1,855	62.73%	2,957	10.30%
Hawthorne	Los Angeles	20,436	81.66%	3,357	13.41%	1,234	4.93%	17,079	68.24%	25,027	2.74%
Hermosa Beach	Los Angeles	6,818	64.18%	2,935	27.63%	871	8.20%	3,883	36.55%	10,624	21.71%
Hidden Hills	Los Angeles	604	58.08%	383	36.83%	53	5.10%	221	21.25%	1,040	33.07%
Huntington Park	Los Angeles	10,191	87.17%	912	7.80%	588	5.03%	9,279	79.37%	11,691	3.58%
Industry	Los Angeles	371	58.15%	236	36.99%	31	4.86%	135	21.16%	638	63.27%
Inglewood	Los Angeles	35,217	91.13%	2,020	5.23%	1,409	3.65%	33,197	85.90%	38,646	-2.86%
Irwindale	Los Angeles	462	71.96%	135	21.03%	45	7.01%	327	50.93%	642	-2.94%
La Canada Flintridge	Los Angeles	6,256	56.96%	4,071	37.06%	657	5.98%	2,185	19.89%	10,984	28.81%
La Habra Heights	Los Angeles	1,044	38.88%	1,496	55.72%	145	5.40%	-452	-16.83%	2,685	14.75%
La Mirada	Los Angeles	10,242	52.10%	8,227	41.85%	1,188	6.04%	2,015	10.25%	19,657	10.09%
La Puente	Los Angeles	8,314	78.87%	1,683	15.97%	544	5.16%	6,631	62.91%	10,541	3.02%
La Verne	Los Angeles	7,142	46.62%	7,249	47.32%	929	6.06%	-107	-0.70%	15,320	6.47%
Lakewood	Los Angeles	20,153	57.73%	12,508	35.83%	2,248	6.44%	7,645	21.90%	34,909	6.66%
Lancaster	Los Angeles	27,110	53.07%	20,828	40.77%	3,145	6.16%	6,282	12.30%	51,083	4.96%
Lawndale	Los Angeles	6,976	76.12%	1,648	17.98%	540	5.89%	5,328	58.14%	9,164	6.20%
Lomita	Los Angeles	4,529	55.69%	3,050	37.50%	554	6.81%	1,479	18.19%	8,133	4.43%
Long Beach	Los Angeles	115,781	70.75%	36,984	22.60%	10,893	6.66%	78,797	48.15%	163,658	5.82%
Los Angeles	Los Angeles	1,017,038	78.45%	212,080	16.36%	67,291	5.19%	804,958	62.09%	1,296,409	6.72%
Lynwood	Los Angeles	14,461	89.63%	970	6.01%	704	4.36%	13,491	83.61%	16,135	2.17%
Malibu	Los Angeles	4,276	64.44%	1,999	30.12%	361	5.44%	2,277	34.31%	6,636	16.57%
Manhattan Beach	Los Angeles	12,308	62.66%	6,069	30.90%	1,264	6.44%	6,239	31.77%	19,641	29.07%
Maywood	Los Angeles	5,158	87.77%	447	7.61%	272	4.63%	4,711	80.16%	5,877	2.47%
Monrovia	Los Angeles	9,484	62.05%	4,723	30.90%	1,077	7.05%	4,761	31.15%	15,284	9.03%
Montebello	Los Angeles	15,455	77.16%	3,507	17.51%	1,068	5.33%	11,948	59.65%	20,030	3.53%
Monterey Park	Los Angeles	12,051	70.28%	4,251	24.79%	845	4.93%	7,800	45.49%	17,147	3.97%
Norwalk	Los Angeles	23,524	73.63%	6,705	20.99%	1,719	5.38%	16,819	52.64%	31,948	5.38%
Palmdale	Los Angeles	30,204	62.05%	15,548	31.94%	2,921	6.00%	14,656	30.11%	48,673	8.10%
Palos Verdes Estates	Los Angeles	3,832	49.59%	3,408	44.10%	488	6.31%	424	5.49%	7,728	30.35%
Paramount	Los Angeles	11,058	84.72%	1,450	11.11%	544	4.17%	9,608	73.61%	13,052	4.14%
Pasadena	Los Angeles	45,020	75.09%	11,388	18.99%	3,548	5.92%	33,632	56.09%	59,956	11.74%
Pico Rivera	Los Angeles	17,570	79.21%	3,440	15.51%	1,172	5.28%	14,130	63.70%	22,182	2.76%
Pomona	Los Angeles	28,321	73.71%	7,767	20.22%	2,333	6.07%	20,554	53.50%	38,421	3.32%
Rancho Palos Verdes	Los Angeles	11,180	52.86%	8,833	41.76%	1,137	5.38%	2,347	11.10%	21,150	19.32%
Redondo Beach	Los Angeles	21,247	62.22%	10,423	30.52%	2,479	7.26%	10,824	31.70%	34,149	14.77%
Rolling Hills	Los Angeles	397	35.23%	663	58.83%	67	5.94%	-266	-23.60%	1,127	21.48%
Rolling Hills Estates	Los Angeles	2,135	49.17%	1,927	44.38%	280	6.45%	208	4.79%	4,342	24.78%
Rosemead	Los Angeles	8,700	75.31%	2,319	20.07%	534	4.62%	6,381	55.23%	11,553	1.35%
San Dimas	Los Angeles	7,319	47.51%	7,174	46.57%	912	5.92%	145	0.94%	15,405	8.14%
San Fernando	Los Angeles	5,617	80.86%	954	13.73%	376	5.41%	4,663	67.12%	6,947	5.61%
San Gabriel	Los Angeles	7,262	68.22%	2,849	26.76%	534	5.02%	4,413	41.46%	10,645	8.62%
San Marino	Los Angeles	3,102	54.89%	2,224	39.36%	325	5.75%	878	15.54%	5,651	33.14%
Santa Clarita	Los Angeles	42,316	48.53%	39,523	45.33%	5,355	6.14%	2,793	3.20%	87,194	10.42%
Santa Fe Springs	Los Angeles	4,927	71.73%	1,547	22.52%	395	5.75%	3,380	49.21%	6,869	4.15%
Santa Monica	Los Angeles	40,109	80.03%	7,153	14.27%	2,857	5.70%	32,956	65.76%	50,119	10.22%
Sierra Madre	Los Angeles	3,908	60.84%	2,079	32.37%	436	6.79%	1,829	28.48%	6,423	16.26%
Signal Hill	Los Angeles	3,055	70.57%	988	22.82%	286	6.61%	2,067	47.75%	4,329	4.73%
South El Monte	Los Angeles	3,847	81.45%	624	13.21%	252	5.34%	3,223	68.24%	4,723	1.06%
South Gate	Los Angeles	21,431	85.17%	2,530	10.05%	1,201	4.77%	18,901	75.12%	25,162	4.05%
South Pasadena	Los Angeles	9,739	75.20%	2,442	18.86%	770	5.95%	7,297	56.34%	12,951	16.04%
Temple City	Los Angeles	6,673	59.04%	4,003	35.42%	626	5.54%	2,670	23.62%	11,302	5.39%
Torrance	Los Angeles	34,658	56.45%	22,732	37.03%	4,004	6.52%	11,926	19.43%	61,394	12.69%
Vernon	Los Angeles	35	72.92%	8	16.67%	5	10.42%	27	56.25%	48	51.12%
Walnut	Los Angeles	6,823	62.04%	3,644	33.13%	531	4.83%	3,179	28.91%	10,998	11.18%
West Covina	Los Angeles	24,065	66.58%	10,169	28.14%	1,908	5.28%	13,896	38.45%	36,142	6.83%
West Hollywood	Los Angeles	16,667	84.39%	2,342	11.86%	741	3.75%	14,325	72.53%	19,750	6.70%
Westlake Village	Los Angeles	2,499	53.55%	1,926	41.27%	242	5.19%	573	12.28%	4,667	18.22%
Whittier	Los Angeles	20,596	60.97%	11,060	32.74%	2,126	6.29%	9,536	28.23%	33,782	10.63%
Unincorporated Area	Los Angeles	234,672	69.82%	83,407	24.81%	18,053	5.37%	151,265	45.00%	336,132	6.18%
Chowchilla	Madera	1,236	36.06%	2,020	58.93%	172	5.02%	-784	-22.87%	3,428	-0.22%
Madera	Madera	6,784	56.27%	4,521	37.50%	751	6.23%	2,263	18.77%	12,056	6.88%
Unincorporated Area	Madera	9,009	33.01%	16,816	61.62%	1,466	5.37%	-7,807	-28.61%	27,291	0.79%
Belvedere	Marin	889	71.12%	292	23.36%	69	5.52%	597	47.76%	1,250	36.54%
Corte Madera	Marin	4,493	82.27%	701	12.84%	267	4.89%	3,792	69.44%	5,461	12.22%
Fairfax	Marin	4,176	85.43%	373	7.63%	339	6.94%	3,803	77.80%	4,888	1.98%
Larkspur	Marin	6,047	80.05%	1,106	14.64%	401	5.31%	4,941	65.41%	7,554	12.54%
Mill Valley	Marin	7,787	87.11%	761	8.51%	391	4.37%	7,026	78.60%	8,939	13.35%
Novato	Marin	18,899	71.37%	6,105	23.05%	1,477	5.58%	12,794	48.31%	26,481	8.93%
Ross	Marin	1,014	72.64%	278	19.91%	104	7.45%	736	52.72%	1,396	36.84%
San Anselmo	Marin	6,786	85.43%	769	9.68%	388	4.88%	6,017	75.75%	7,943	7.11%
San Rafael	Marin	21,002	79.29%	4,069	15.36%	1,418	5.35%	16,933	63.92%	26,489	10.99%
Sausalito	Marin	3,824	81.22%	636	13.51%	248	5.27%	3,188	67.71%	4,708	13.16%
Tiburon	Marin	3,918	74.70%	995	18.97%	332	6.33%	2,923	55.73%	5,245	25.57%
Unincorporated Area	Marin	29,872	79.10%	5,686	15.06%	2,206	5.84%	24,186	64.05%	37,764	11.00%
Unincorporated Area	Mariposa	3,122	35.17%	5,185	58.41%	570	6.42%	-2,063	-23.24%	8,877	-4.94%
Fort Bragg	Mendocino	1,782	67.25%	686	25.89%	182	6.87%	1,096	41.36%	2,650	-6.74%
Point Arena	Mendocino	146	74.49%	28	14.29%	22	11.22%	118	60.20%	196	-9.58%
Ukiah	Mendocino	3,512	60.80%	1,725	29.86%	539	9.33%	1,787	30.94%	5,776	-6.43%
Willits	Mendocino	1,007	56.80%	592	33.39%	174	9.81%	415	23.41%	1,773	-18.77%
Unincorporated Area	Mendocino	15,632	59.75%	7,857	30.03%	2,673	10.22%	7,775	29.72%	26,162	-8.19%
Atwater	Merced	3,992	48.47%	3,795	46.08%	449	5.45%	197	2.39%	8,236	2.00%
Dos Palos	Merced	675	50.11%	598	44.39%	74	5.49%	77	5.72%	1,347	8.38%
Gustine	Merced	762	47.57%	735	45.88%	105	6.55%	27	1.69%	1,602	-5.16%
Livingston	Merced	2,418	79.72%	452	14.90%	163	5.37%	1,966	64.82%	3,033	0.90%
Los Banos	Merced	5,891	59.57%	3,445	34.83%	554	5.60%	2,446	24.73%	9,890	0.73%
Merced	Merced	12,868	57.99%	7,833	35.30%	1,488	6.71%	5,035	22.69%	22,189	4.31%
Unincorporated Area	Merced	10,711	44.97%	11,867	49.82%	1,240	5.21%	-1,156	-4.85%	23,818	3.86%
Alturas	Modoc	260	26.86%	651	67.25%	57	5.89%	-391	-40.39%	968	-9.71%
Unincorporated Area	Modoc	617	22.11%	2,045	73.30%	128	4.59%	-1,428	-51.18%	2,790	-5.25%
Mammoth Lakes	Mono	1,591	61.45%	787	30.40%	211	8.15%	804	31.05%	2,589	5.49%
Unincorporated Area	Mono	1,182	44.07%	1,324	49.37%	176	6.56%	-142	-5.29%	2,682	1.39%
Carmel-by-the-Sea	Monterey (Note: 2012's city results in Monterey county are missing 4 write in votes done for the candidates on the ballot, as they were put on their own county-wide line item rather than being included in the city results.)	1,385	63.62%	662	30.41%	130	5.97%	723	33.21%	2,177	9.66%
Del Rey Oaks	Monterey	593	64.60%	258	28.10%	67	7.30%	335	36.49%	918	1.66%
Gonzales	Monterey	1,594	79.50%	322	16.06%	89	4.44%	1,272	63.44%	2,005	-0.20%
Greenfield	Monterey	2,429	80.43%	434	14.37%	157	5.20%	1,995	66.06%	3,020	-1.33%
King City	Monterey	1,458	69.56%	519	24.76%	119	5.68%	939	44.80%	2,096	4.04%
Marina	Monterey	4,889	67.07%	1,889	25.92%	511	7.01%	3,000	41.16%	7,289	-0.14%
Monterey	Monterey	8,206	69.18%	2,890	24.37%	765	6.45%	5,316	44.82%	11,861	5.45%
Pacific Grove	Monterey	5,802	71.70%	1,806	22.32%	484	5.98%	3,996	49.38%	8,092	6.06%
Salinas	Monterey	27,201	72.38%	8,224	21.88%	2,157	5.74%	18,977	50.49%	37,582	2.09%
Sand City	Monterey	93	59.62%	44	28.21%	19	12.18%	49	31.41%	156	4.69%
Seaside	Monterey	6,345	72.04%	1,887	21.42%	576	6.54%	4,458	50.61%	8,808	-2.84%
Soledad	Monterey	2,928	80.13%	524	14.34%	202	5.53%	2,404	65.79%	3,654	0.14%
Unincorporated Area	Monterey	26,165	58.99%	15,436	34.80%	2,755	6.21%	10,729	24.19%	44,356	6.63%
American Canyon	Napa	5,456	71.66%	1,738	22.83%	420	5.52%	3,718	48.83%	7,614	4.36%
Calistoga	Napa	1,412	72.63%	413	21.24%	119	6.12%	999	51.39%	1,944	6.48%
Napa	Napa	22,127	65.29%	9,535	28.14%	2,227	6.57%	12,592	37.16%	33,889	5.80%
St. Helena	Napa	1,990	70.64%	658	23.36%	169	6.00%	1,332	47.28%	2,817	14.83%
Yountville	Napa	1,059	65.61%	471	29.18%	84	5.20%	588	36.43%	1,614	6.07%
Unincorporated Area	Napa	7,155	56.11%	4,596	36.04%	1,001	7.85%	2,559	20.07%	12,752	9.23%
Grass Valley	Nevada	3,218	50.41%	2,560	40.10%	606	9.49%	658	10.31%	6,384	-0.20%
Nevada City	Nevada	1,296	66.74%	437	22.50%	209	10.76%	859	44.23%	1,942	1.84%
Truckee	Nevada	5,135	66.24%	1,996	25.75%	621	8.01%	3,139	40.49%	7,752	10.60%
Unincorporated Area	Nevada	16,404	43.18%	18,372	48.36%	3,216	8.46%	-1,968	-5.18%	37,992	4.57%
Aliso Viejo	Orange	10,968	52.18%	8,708	41.43%	1,342	6.39%	2,260	10.75%	21,018	13.57%
Anaheim	Orange	59,566	58.48%	36,438	35.78%	5,849	5.74%	23,128	22.71%	101,853	14.79%
Brea	Orange	8,724	45.08%	9,432	48.74%	1,196	6.18%	-708	-3.66%	19,352	14.60%
Buena Park	Orange	14,872	57.06%	9,679	37.13%	1,515	5.81%	5,193	19.92%	26,066	9.26%
Costa Mesa	Orange	21,528	51.51%	17,219	41.20%	3,043	7.28%	4,309	10.31%	41,790	11.26%
Cypress	Orange	10,079	50.10%	8,819	43.84%	1,219	6.06%	1,260	6.26%	20,117	11.56%
Dana Point	Orange	7,507	42.97%	8,960	51.29%	1,003	5.74%	-1,453	-8.32%	17,470	9.66%
Fountain Valley	Orange	12,009	47.30%	11,931	47.00%	1,447	5.70%	78	0.31%	25,387	14.20%
Fullerton	Orange	27,410	54.06%	20,001	39.45%	3,294	6.50%	7,409	14.61%	50,705	15.80%
Garden Grove	Orange	30,244	58.88%	18,443	35.90%	2,682	5.22%	11,801	22.97%	51,369	13.46%
Huntington Beach	Orange	40,980	43.66%	47,007	50.08%	5,871	6.26%	-6,027	-6.42%	93,858	9.13%
Irvine	Orange	56,417	61.94%	29,513	32.40%	5,158	5.66%	26,904	29.54%	91,088	19.66%
La Habra	Orange	10,865	53.96%	8,048	39.97%	1,224	6.08%	2,817	13.99%	20,137	12.78%
La Palma	Orange	3,441	53.90%	2,606	40.82%	337	5.28%	835	13.08%	6,384	12.58%
Laguna Beach	Orange	8,337	60.34%	4,744	34.34%	735	5.32%	3,593	26.01%	13,816	14.04%
Laguna Hills	Orange	6,647	46.41%	6,844	47.79%	831	5.80%	-197	-1.38%	14,322	15.12%
Laguna Niguel	Orange	14,954	46.49%	15,511	48.22%	1,699	5.28%	-557	-1.73%	32,164	15.58%
Laguna Woods	Orange	6,096	51.71%	5,320	45.13%	373	3.16%	776	6.58%	11,789	9.14%
Lake Forest	Orange	16,221	46.42%	16,488	47.18%	2,235	6.40%	-267	-0.76%	34,944	15.13%
Los Alamitos	Orange	2,372	47.60%	2,270	45.55%	341	6.84%	102	2.05%	4,983	8.82%
Mission Viejo	Orange	21,051	44.13%	23,930	50.16%	2,722	5.71%	-2,879	-6.04%	47,703	13.33%
Newport Beach	Orange	18,073	40.15%	24,460	54.34%	2,478	5.51%	-6,387	-14.19%	45,011	19.26%
Orange	Orange	25,982	48.17%	24,519	45.45%	3,441	6.38%	1,463	2.71%	53,942	14.47%
Placentia	Orange	9,828	46.98%	9,814	46.92%	1,276	6.10%	14	0.07%	20,918	13.67%
Rancho Santa Margarita	Orange	9,564	43.19%	11,238	50.75%	1,341	6.06%	-1,674	-7.56%	22,143	16.28%
San Clemente	Orange	12,620	39.75%	17,237	54.29%	1,891	5.96%	-4,617	-14.54%	31,748	12.17%
San Juan Capistrano	Orange	6,677	42.57%	8,204	52.31%	802	5.11%	-1,527	-9.74%	15,683	13.71%
Santa Ana	Orange	53,755	73.70%	15,225	20.87%	3,961	5.43%	38,530	52.82%	72,941	11.99%
Seal Beach	Orange	7,087	47.93%	7,020	47.48%	679	4.59%	67	0.45%	14,786	11.67%
Stanton	Orange	6,286	63.51%	3,095	31.27%	517	5.22%	3,191	32.24%	9,898	10.21%
Tustin	Orange	15,143	57.18%	9,690	36.59%	1,649	6.23%	5,453	20.59%	26,482	18.59%
Villa Park	Orange	1,098	31.65%	2,193	63.22%	178	5.13%	-1,095	-31.57%	3,469	17.04%
Westminster	Orange	16,785	55.22%	12,078	39.73%	1,535	5.05%	4,707	15.48%	30,398	13.07%
Yorba Linda	Orange	12,232	35.34%	20,611	59.54%	1,773	5.12%	-8,379	-24.21%	34,616	14.31%
Unincorporated Area	Orange	24,543	42.42%	29,853	51.60%	3,457	5.98%	-5,310	-9.18%	57,853	17.57%
Auburn	Placer	3,352	47.19%	3,178	44.74%	573	8.07%	174	2.45%	7,103	8.22%
Colfax	Placer	296	37.05%	433	54.19%	70	8.76%	-137	-17.15%	799	-4.48%
Lincoln	Placer	9,084	39.24%	12,789	55.25%	1,276	5.51%	-3,705	-16.01%	23,149	5.94%
Loomis	Placer	1,083	30.71%	2,152	61.03%	291	8.25%	-1,069	-30.32%	3,526	3.94%
Rocklin	Placer	11,571	40.99%	14,627	51.82%	2,029	7.19%	-3,056	-10.83%	28,227	9.77%
Roseville	Placer	25,888	43.29%	30,003	50.17%	3,915	6.55%	-4,115	-6.88%	59,806	9.00%
Unincorporated Area	Placer	22,235	38.32%	31,956	55.08%	3,830	6.60%	-9,721	-16.75%	58,021	5.36%
Portola	Plumas	294	38.53%	410	53.74%	59	7.73%	-116	-15.20%	763	-5.15%
Unincorporated Area	Plumas	3,165	36.20%	5,010	57.31%	567	6.49%	-1,845	-21.11%	8,742	-3.64%
Banning	Riverside	4,728	46.26%	5,030	49.21%	463	4.53%	-302	-2.95%	10,221	1.57%
Beaumont	Riverside	6,888	44.25%	7,900	50.75%	778	5.00%	-1,012	-6.50%	15,566	0.70%
Blythe	Riverside	1,473	46.10%	1,560	48.83%	162	5.07%	-87	-2.72%	3,195	-6.27%
Calimesa	Riverside	1,177	31.40%	2,366	63.11%	206	5.49%	-1,189	-31.72%	3,749	-1.73%
Canyon Lake	Riverside	1,175	21.68%	4,052	74.76%	193	3.56%	-2,877	-53.08%	5,420	-5.52%
Cathedral City	Riverside	10,279	67.07%	4,428	28.89%	619	4.04%	5,851	38.18%	15,326	7.25%
Coachella	Riverside	6,450	85.22%	745	9.84%	374	4.94%	5,705	75.37%	7,569	-1.97%
Corona	Riverside	25,292	48.87%	23,592	45.58%	2,873	5.55%	1,700	3.28%	51,757	6.78%
Desert Hot Springs	Riverside	4,228	61.29%	2,284	33.11%	386	5.60%	1,944	28.18%	6,898	-1.59%
Eastvale	Riverside	10,811	55.27%	7,836	40.06%	912	4.66%	2,975	15.21%	19,559	1.60%
Hemet	Riverside	11,505	43.16%	13,868	52.02%	1,285	4.82%	-2,363	-8.86%	26,658	1.03%
Indian Wells	Riverside	773	31.22%	1,624	65.59%	79	3.19%	-851	-34.37%	2,476	13.06%
Indio	Riverside	14,345	59.14%	8,911	36.74%	1,000	4.12%	5,434	22.40%	24,256	4.50%
Jurupa Valley	Riverside	14,906	57.51%	9,584	36.98%	1,427	5.51%	5,322	20.53%	25,917	4.75%
La Quinta	Riverside	7,377	44.65%	8,477	51.31%	666	4.03%	-1,100	-6.66%	16,520	10.48%
Lake Elsinore	Riverside	8,247	46.22%	8,638	48.41%	957	5.36%	-391	-2.19%	17,842	-1.51%
Menifee	Riverside	13,410	38.55%	19,659	56.52%	1,715	4.93%	-6,249	-17.97%	34,784	-0.14%
Moreno Valley	Riverside	37,673	67.35%	15,221	27.21%	3,039	5.43%	22,452	40.14%	55,933	0.76%
Murrieta	Riverside	14,887	36.77%	23,441	57.90%	2,154	5.32%	-8,554	-21.13%	40,482	3.93%
Norco	Riverside	2,895	29.33%	6,487	65.72%	489	4.95%	-3,592	-36.39%	9,871	-0.92%
Palm Desert	Riverside	10,121	47.00%	10,551	49.00%	860	3.99%	-430	-2.00%	21,532	9.51%
Palm Springs	Riverside	14,948	72.24%	5,156	24.92%	587	2.84%	9,792	47.32%	20,691	8.11%
Perris	Riverside	12,667	75.19%	3,211	19.06%	969	5.75%	9,456	56.13%	16,847	-1.21%
Rancho Mirage	Riverside	4,367	50.21%	4,124	47.41%	207	2.38%	243	2.79%	8,698	14.76%
Riverside	Riverside	54,989	56.41%	36,259	37.20%	6,233	6.39%	18,730	19.21%	97,481	3.41%
San Jacinto	Riverside	6,377	52.65%	5,047	41.67%	687	5.67%	1,330	10.98%	12,111	5.15%
Temecula	Riverside	15,806	38.18%	23,045	55.67%	2,543	6.14%	-7,239	-17.49%	41,394	6.73%
Wildomar	Riverside	4,483	35.62%	7,320	58.16%	782	6.21%	-2,837	-22.54%	12,585	0.33%
Unincorporated Area	Riverside	51,418	42.69%	62,827	52.16%	6,197	5.15%	-11,409	-9.47%	120,442	3.33%
Citrus Heights	Sacramento	14,008	42.12%	16,815	50.56%	2,434	7.32%	-2,807	-8.44%	33,257	1.14%
Elk Grove	Sacramento	40,081	60.69%	22,121	33.49%	3,842	5.82%	17,960	27.19%	66,044	9.78%
Folsom	Sacramento	15,118	46.59%	14,957	46.09%	2,375	7.32%	161	0.50%	32,450	13.71%
Galt	Sacramento	3,689	42.76%	4,352	50.44%	587	6.80%	-663	-7.68%	8,628	-1.23%
Isleton	Sacramento	141	55.29%	95	37.25%	19	7.45%	46	18.04%	255	-17.59%
Rancho Cordova	Sacramento	13,198	53.98%	9,367	38.31%	1,886	7.71%	3,831	15.67%	24,451	-0.19%
Sacramento	Sacramento	127,245	73.82%	34,486	20.01%	10,645	6.18%	92,759	53.81%	172,376	5.41%
Unincorporated Area	Sacramento	112,543	52.31%	87,596	40.71%	15,026	6.98%	24,947	11.59%	215,165	4.52%
Hollister	San Benito	8,022	64.70%	3,649	29.43%	727	5.86%	4,373	35.27%	12,398	-0.90%
San Juan Bautista	San Benito	534	67.17%	214	26.92%	47	5.91%	320	40.25%	795	2.82%
Unincorporated Area	San Benito	3,965	46.72%	3,978	46.88%	543	6.40%	-13	-0.15%	8,486	1.13%
Adelanto	San Bernardino	4,221	67.88%	1,678	26.99%	319	5.13%	2,543	40.90%	6,218	2.22%
Apple Valley	San Bernardino	9,038	32.72%	17,212	62.32%	1,370	4.96%	-8,174	-29.59%	27,620	-1.49%
Barstow	San Bernardino	2,524	44.84%	2,668	47.40%	437	7.76%	-144	-2.56%	5,629	-9.03%
Big Bear Lake	San Bernardino	725	33.01%	1,356	61.75%	115	5.24%	-631	-28.73%	2,196	0.68%
Chino	San Bernardino	14,339	53.31%	11,250	41.82%	1,309	4.87%	3,089	11.48%	26,898	5.62%
Chino Hills	San Bernardino	15,116	49.79%	13,769	45.35%	1,477	4.86%	1,347	4.44%	30,362	10.10%
Colton	San Bernardino	9,335	69.20%	3,360	24.91%	794	5.89%	5,975	44.30%	13,489	1.12%
Fontana	San Bernardino	38,152	68.96%	14,501	26.21%	2,674	4.83%	23,651	42.75%	55,327	1.36%
Grand Terrace	San Bernardino	2,380	47.97%	2,281	45.98%	300	6.05%	99	2.00%	4,961	2.15%
Hesperia	San Bernardino	10,987	40.47%	14,741	54.30%	1,419	5.23%	-3,754	-13.83%	27,147	-0.24%
Highland	San Bernardino	8,994	53.07%	7,051	41.61%	902	5.32%	1,943	11.47%	16,947	3.74%
Loma Linda	San Bernardino	4,157	53.62%	2,973	38.35%	623	8.04%	1,184	15.27%	7,753	12.58%
Montclair	San Bernardino	6,800	69.60%	2,425	24.82%	545	5.58%	4,375	44.78%	9,770	4.48%
Needles	San Bernardino	476	36.12%	773	58.65%	69	5.24%	-297	-22.53%	1,318	-24.23%
Ontario	San Bernardino	29,035	64.83%	13,283	29.66%	2,466	5.51%	15,752	35.17%	44,784	5.78%
Rancho Cucamonga	San Bernardino	33,428	49.29%	30,715	45.29%	3,680	5.43%	2,713	4.00%	67,823	5.31%
Redlands	San Bernardino	14,867	49.18%	13,417	44.38%	1,945	6.43%	1,450	4.80%	30,229	8.48%
Rialto	San Bernardino	19,659	73.41%	5,767	21.54%	1,353	5.05%	13,892	51.88%	26,779	-0.47%
San Bernardino	San Bernardino	33,760	66.48%	14,153	27.87%	2,867	5.65%	19,607	38.61%	50,780	1.05%
Twentynine Palms	San Bernardino	1,581	36.77%	2,362	54.93%	357	8.30%	-781	-18.16%	4,300	-1.70%
Upland	San Bernardino	15,447	50.19%	13,656	44.37%	1,677	5.45%	1,791	5.82%	30,780	8.18%
Victorville	San Bernardino	17,605	56.15%	12,058	38.46%	1,690	5.39%	5,547	17.69%	31,353	1.67%
Yucaipa	San Bernardino	6,937	31.99%	13,502	62.26%	1,247	5.75%	-6,565	-30.27%	21,686	-2.15%
Yucca Valley	San Bernardino	2,594	32.34%	5,002	62.37%	424	5.29%	-2,408	-30.02%	8,020	-4.54%
Unincorporated Area	San Bernardino	38,661	40.56%	51,272	53.79%	5,377	5.64%	-12,611	-13.23%	95,310	0.55%
Unallocated Write-Ins (Note: From California's Supplement to the Statement of Vote: San Bernardino County is unable to provide a jurisdictional breakdown for write-in votes cast for presidential candidates who were listed on the ballot. Therefore, any write-in votes cast for a presidential candidate listed on the ballot are included in a line item identified as Multiple districts of San Bernardino.)	San Bernardino	15	44.12%	15	44.12%	4	11.76%	0	0.00%	34	N/A
Carlsbad	San Diego	30,493	52.12%	24,379	41.67%	3,636	6.21%	6,114	10.45%	58,508	19.00%
Chula Vista	San Diego	64,541	66.13%	27,991	28.68%	5,064	5.19%	36,550	37.45%	97,596	14.87%
Coronado	San Diego	4,024	45.90%	4,213	48.06%	530	6.05%	-189	-2.16%	8,767	17.90%
Del Mar	San Diego	1,639	61.83%	858	32.37%	154	5.81%	781	29.46%	2,651	21.28%
El Cajon	San Diego	13,867	45.38%	14,956	48.94%	1,736	5.68%	-1,089	-3.56%	30,559	2.43%
Encinitas	San Diego	21,261	62.36%	10,570	31.00%	2,263	6.64%	10,691	31.36%	34,094	16.17%
Escondido	San Diego	23,627	49.26%	21,144	44.08%	3,193	6.66%	2,483	5.18%	47,964	13.68%
Imperial Beach	San Diego	5,051	57.63%	3,100	35.37%	614	7.01%	1,951	22.26%	8,765	3.35%
La Mesa	San Diego	15,131	57.44%	9,439	35.83%	1,774	6.73%	5,692	21.61%	26,344	8.65%
Lemon Grove	San Diego	6,097	61.90%	3,131	31.79%	622	6.31%	2,966	30.11%	9,850	5.16%
National City	San Diego	11,211	73.81%	3,192	21.01%	787	5.18%	8,019	52.79%	15,190	11.35%
Oceanside	San Diego	35,324	50.94%	29,578	42.65%	4,441	6.40%	5,746	8.29%	69,343	7.05%
Poway	San Diego	10,615	44.33%	11,720	48.94%	1,613	6.74%	-1,105	-4.61%	23,948	16.54%
San Diego	San Diego	364,108	65.86%	154,797	28.00%	33,909	6.13%	209,311	37.86%	552,814	13.00%
San Marcos	San Diego	17,231	51.52%	14,101	42.16%	2,113	6.32%	3,130	9.36%	33,445	14.69%
Santee	San Diego	9,553	37.24%	14,476	56.43%	1,625	6.33%	-4,923	-19.19%	25,654	2.97%
Solana Beach	San Diego	4,399	59.89%	2,540	34.58%	406	5.53%	1,859	25.31%	7,345	21.38%
Vista	San Diego	16,201	51.59%	13,008	41.42%	2,193	6.98%	3,193	10.17%	31,402	13.07%
Unincorporated Area	San Diego	81,103	39.21%	114,573	55.39%	11,163	5.40%	-33,470	-16.18%	206,839	8.34%
San Francisco	San Francisco	345,084	85.55%	37,688	9.34%	20,586	5.10%	307,396	76.21%	403,358	5.62%
Escalon	San Joaquin	994	33.03%	1,840	61.15%	175	5.82%	-846	-28.12%	3,009	-3.32%
Lathrop	San Joaquin	4,234	65.76%	1,848	28.70%	357	5.54%	2,386	37.06%	6,439	-4.15%
Lodi	San Joaquin	8,797	39.85%	11,878	53.81%	1,400	6.34%	-3,081	-13.96%	22,075	3.64%
Manteca	San Joaquin	12,837	49.68%	11,517	44.58%	1,483	5.74%	1,320	5.11%	25,837	-1.14%
Ripon	San Joaquin	1,848	27.52%	4,475	66.65%	391	5.82%	-2,627	-39.13%	6,714	-0.76%
Stockton	San Joaquin	54,172	66.86%	22,780	28.12%	4,065	5.02%	31,392	38.75%	81,017	1.34%
Tracy	San Joaquin	17,039	60.43%	9,535	33.82%	1,622	5.75%	7,504	26.61%	28,196	-0.03%
Unincorporated Area	San Joaquin	21,203	43.40%	25,063	51.30%	2,593	5.31%	-3,860	-7.90%	48,859	1.78%
Arroyo Grande	San Luis Obispo	4,615	47.55%	4,325	44.56%	766	7.89%	290	2.99%	9,706	8.02%
Atascadero	San Luis Obispo	6,318	43.97%	6,937	48.28%	1,114	7.75%	-619	-4.31%	14,369	3.39%
El Paso de Robles	San Luis Obispo	5,336	42.11%	6,480	51.14%	856	6.76%	-1,144	-9.03%	12,672	5.71%
Grover Beach	San Luis Obispo	2,819	50.80%	2,258	40.69%	472	8.51%	561	10.11%	5,549	2.98%
Morro Bay	San Luis Obispo	3,444	57.34%	2,179	36.28%	383	6.38%	1,265	21.06%	6,006	1.48%
Pismo Beach	San Luis Obispo	2,415	49.26%	2,193	44.73%	295	6.02%	222	4.53%	4,903	7.36%
San Luis Obispo	San Luis Obispo	15,385	68.33%	5,040	22.39%	2,090	9.28%	10,345	45.95%	22,515	14.29%
Unincorporated Area	San Luis Obispo	26,775	46.73%	26,752	46.69%	3,770	6.58%	23	0.04%	57,297	6.09%
Atherton	San Mateo	2,620	66.65%	1,024	26.05%	287	7.30%	1,596	40.60%	3,931	45.50%
Belmont	San Mateo	9,847	75.20%	2,532	19.34%	716	5.47%	7,315	55.86%	13,095	10.77%
Brisbane	San Mateo	1,739	78.62%	362	16.37%	111	5.02%	1,377	62.25%	2,212	2.45%
Burlingame	San Mateo	10,847	75.37%	2,809	19.52%	735	5.11%	8,038	55.85%	14,391	15.79%
Colma	San Mateo	428	84.09%	67	13.16%	14	2.75%	361	70.92%	509	2.35%
Daly City	San Mateo	25,775	80.32%	5,110	15.92%	1,206	3.76%	20,665	64.40%	32,091	5.09%
East Palo Alto	San Mateo	5,906	89.00%	409	6.16%	321	4.84%	5,497	82.84%	6,636	-1.55%
Foster City	San Mateo	9,481	73.31%	2,819	21.80%	632	4.89%	6,662	51.52%	12,932	9.71%
Half Moon Bay	San Mateo	4,264	72.38%	1,260	21.39%	367	6.23%	3,004	50.99%	5,891	11.19%
Hillsborough	San Mateo	3,757	63.04%	1,831	30.72%	372	6.24%	1,926	32.32%	5,960	40.01%
Menlo Park	San Mateo	12,833	82.15%	1,959	12.54%	829	5.31%	10,874	69.61%	15,621	22.15%
Millbrae	San Mateo	6,616	70.02%	2,371	25.09%	462	4.89%	4,245	44.93%	9,449	8.52%
Pacifica	San Mateo	14,755	74.89%	3,825	19.42%	1,121	5.69%	10,930	55.48%	19,701	1.32%
Portola Valley	San Mateo	2,196	76.54%	495	17.25%	178	6.20%	1,701	59.29%	2,869	29.23%
Redwood City	San Mateo	25,413	77.29%	5,728	17.42%	1,737	5.28%	19,685	59.87%	32,878	12.12%
San Bruno	San Mateo	12,673	74.16%	3,598	21.05%	818	4.79%	9,075	53.10%	17,089	0.48%
San Carlos	San Mateo	12,457	75.84%	3,119	18.99%	849	5.17%	9,338	56.85%	16,425	16.87%
San Mateo	San Mateo	32,905	76.19%	8,195	18.97%	2,090	4.84%	24,710	57.21%	43,190	10.47%
South San Francisco	San Mateo	18,536	78.26%	4,213	17.79%	936	3.95%	14,323	60.47%	23,685	3.37%
Woodside	San Mateo	2,305	68.44%	836	24.82%	227	6.74%	1,469	43.62%	3,368	33.02%
Unincorporated Area	San Mateo	22,529	76.37%	5,367	18.19%	1,605	5.44%	17,162	58.17%	29,501	10.54%
Buellton	Santa Barbara	1,121	47.40%	1,080	45.67%	164	6.93%	41	1.73%	2,365	7.02%
Carpinteria	Santa Barbara	4,020	67.71%	1,539	25.92%	378	6.37%	2,481	41.79%	5,937	10.24%
Goleta	Santa Barbara	9,705	66.95%	3,864	26.66%	926	6.39%	5,841	40.30%	14,495	12.95%
Guadalupe	Santa Barbara	1,201	72.96%	355	21.57%	90	5.47%	846	51.40%	1,646	2.01%
Lompoc	Santa Barbara	6,579	51.82%	5,189	40.87%	929	7.32%	1,390	10.95%	12,697	6.06%
Santa Barbara	Santa Barbara	31,001	74.84%	7,842	18.93%	2,580	6.23%	23,159	55.91%	41,423	10.14%
Santa Maria	Santa Barbara	13,135	55.78%	9,088	38.59%	1,325	5.63%	4,047	17.19%	23,548	11.72%
Solvang	Santa Barbara	1,348	46.71%	1,383	47.92%	155	5.37%	-35	-1.21%	2,886	11.75%
Unincorporated Area	Santa Barbara	39,032	56.02%	26,025	37.35%	4,613	6.62%	13,007	18.67%	69,670	12.12%
Campbell	Santa Clara	13,479	70.84%	4,280	22.49%	1,269	6.67%	9,199	48.34%	19,028	8.27%
Cupertino	Santa Clara	17,776	74.66%	4,794	20.14%	1,238	5.20%	12,982	54.53%	23,808	12.82%
Gilroy	Santa Clara	12,285	65.48%	5,330	28.41%	1,146	6.11%	6,955	37.07%	18,761	2.50%
Los Altos	Santa Clara	12,991	75.40%	3,291	19.10%	947	5.50%	9,700	56.30%	17,229	24.79%
Los Altos Hills	Santa Clara	3,386	68.65%	1,205	24.43%	341	6.91%	2,181	44.22%	4,932	30.16%
Los Gatos	Santa Clara	11,433	69.04%	4,128	24.93%	1,000	6.04%	7,305	44.11%	16,561	18.67%
Milpitas	Santa Clara	16,492	73.48%	4,782	21.31%	1,171	5.22%	11,710	52.17%	22,445	6.64%
Monte Sereno	Santa Clara	1,366	65.27%	597	28.52%	130	6.21%	769	36.74%	2,093	27.36%
Morgan Hill	Santa Clara	11,067	60.49%	5,954	32.54%	1,275	6.97%	5,113	27.95%	18,296	7.31%
Mountain View	Santa Clara	25,002	80.41%	4,139	13.31%	1,953	6.28%	20,863	67.10%	31,094	10.98%
Palo Alto	Santa Clara	28,002	82.47%	4,142	12.20%	1,809	5.33%	23,860	70.27%	33,953	13.12%
San Jose	Santa Clara	256,006	73.82%	71,118	20.51%	19,677	5.67%	184,888	53.31%	346,801	7.71%
Santa Clara	Santa Clara	29,647	73.22%	8,275	20.44%	2,571	6.35%	21,372	52.78%	40,493	6.65%
Saratoga	Santa Clara	11,480	68.58%	4,286	25.60%	973	5.81%	7,194	42.98%	16,739	22.91%
Sunnyvale	Santa Clara	37,165	75.22%	9,139	18.50%	3,104	6.28%	28,026	56.72%	49,408	9.49%
Unincorporated Area	Santa Clara	22,819	67.16%	9,054	26.65%	2,105	6.20%	13,765	40.51%	33,978	9.90%
Unallocated Write-Ins (Note: From California's Supplement to the Statement of Vote: Santa Clara County is unable to provide a jurisdictional breakdown for write-in votes cast for presidential candidates who were listed on the ballot. Therefore, any write-in votes cast for a presidential candidate listed on the ballot are included in a line item identified as Multiple districts of Santa Clara County.)	Santa Clara	1,288	78.58%	312	19.04%	39	2.38%	976	59.55%	1,639	N/A
Capitola	Santa Cruz	3,872	74.09%	1,002	19.17%	352	6.74%	2,870	54.92%	5,226	-1.02%
Santa Cruz	Santa Cruz	26,038	82.41%	3,094	9.79%	2,463	7.80%	22,944	72.62%	31,595	-0.02%
Scotts Valley	Santa Cruz	4,232	64.41%	1,824	27.76%	514	7.82%	2,408	36.65%	6,570	10.41%
Watsonville	Santa Cruz	10,753	81.57%	1,810	13.73%	619	4.70%	8,943	67.84%	13,182	1.98%
Unincorporated Area	Santa Cruz	50,354	71.37%	14,708	20.85%	5,489	7.78%	35,646	50.53%	70,551	1.47%
Anderson	Shasta	948	26.95%	2,307	65.60%	262	7.45%	-1,359	-38.64%	3,517	-16.82%
Redding	Shasta	12,002	30.86%	24,265	62.40%	2,621	6.74%	-12,263	-31.53%	38,888	-5.10%
Shasta Lake	Shasta	1,170	28.99%	2,569	63.65%	297	7.36%	-1,399	-34.66%	4,036	-16.25%
Unincorporated Area	Shasta	8,181	25.06%	22,637	69.33%	1,831	5.61%	-14,456	-44.28%	32,649	-9.72%
Loyalton	Sierra	111	32.55%	206	60.41%	24	7.04%	-95	-27.86%	341	-4.85%
Unincorporated Area	Sierra	490	33.49%	842	57.55%	131	8.95%	-352	-24.06%	1,463	-1.51%
Dorris	Siskiyou	75	28.96%	165	63.71%	19	7.34%	-90	-34.75%	259	-7.08%
Dunsmuir	Siskiyou	353	51.16%	267	38.70%	70	10.14%	86	12.46%	690	-10.93%
Etna	Siskiyou	102	32.18%	195	61.51%	20	6.31%	-93	-29.34%	317	-0.77%
Fort Jones	Siskiyou	84	30.11%	172	61.65%	23	8.24%	-88	-31.54%	279	-6.19%
Montague	Siskiyou	127	23.05%	385	69.87%	39	7.08%	-258	-46.82%	551	-7.32%
Mt. Shasta	Siskiyou	881	56.01%	508	32.29%	184	11.70%	373	23.71%	1,573	-1.21%
Tulelake	Siskiyou	51	27.57%	122	65.95%	12	6.49%	-71	-38.38%	185	5.95%
Weed	Siskiyou	376	47.30%	354	44.53%	65	8.18%	22	2.77%	795	-12.18%
Yreka	Siskiyou	980	32.25%	1,829	60.18%	230	7.57%	-849	-27.94%	3,039	-6.47%
Unincorporated Area	Siskiyou	4,205	33.84%	7,344	59.11%	876	7.05%	-3,139	-25.26%	12,425	-3.93%
Benicia	Solano	9,900	65.93%	4,130	27.51%	985	6.56%	5,770	38.43%	15,015	7.49%
Dixon	Solano	3,642	49.45%	3,250	44.13%	473	6.42%	392	5.32%	7,365	3.94%
Fairfield	Solano	24,414	64.08%	11,412	29.95%	2,273	5.97%	13,002	34.13%	38,099	2.23%
Rio Vista	Solano	2,593	52.78%	2,067	42.07%	253	5.15%	526	10.71%	4,913	0.18%
Suisun City	Solano	6,620	67.25%	2,577	26.18%	647	6.57%	4,043	41.07%	9,844	-2.85%
Vacaville	Solano	17,881	49.22%	15,903	43.78%	2,544	7.00%	1,978	5.44%	36,328	-1.78%
Vallejo	Solano	33,510	76.65%	8,068	18.45%	2,140	4.90%	25,442	58.20%	43,718	1.64%
Unincorporated Area	Solano	3,800	43.05%	4,513	51.13%	514	5.82%	-713	-8.08%	8,827	12.08%
Cloverdale	Sonoma	2,407	63.43%	1,098	28.93%	290	7.64%	1,309	34.49%	3,795	-2.69%
Cotati	Sonoma	2,497	68.58%	831	22.82%	313	8.60%	1,666	45.76%	3,641	-5.29%
Healdsburg	Sonoma	4,235	73.49%	1,151	19.97%	377	6.54%	3,084	53.51%	5,763	5.74%
Petaluma	Sonoma	21,414	71.91%	6,280	21.09%	2,085	7.00%	15,134	50.82%	29,779	2.89%
Rohnert Park	Sonoma	11,605	66.90%	4,416	25.46%	1,327	7.65%	7,189	41.44%	17,348	-3.36%
Santa Rosa	Sonoma	52,476	71.50%	15,660	21.34%	5,259	7.17%	36,816	50.16%	73,395	2.84%
Sebastopol	Sonoma	3,706	81.52%	495	10.89%	345	7.59%	3,211	70.63%	4,546	-0.74%
Sonoma	Sonoma	4,467	72.75%	1,331	21.68%	342	5.57%	3,136	51.07%	6,140	7.83%
Windsor	Sonoma	7,970	64.32%	3,482	28.10%	940	7.59%	4,488	36.22%	12,392	4.24%
Unincorporated Area	Sonoma	49,658	68.91%	16,664	23.13%	5,735	7.96%	32,994	45.79%	72,057	0.91%
Ceres	Stanislaus	7,627	59.36%	4,485	34.91%	736	5.73%	3,142	24.46%	12,848	0.02%
Hughson	Stanislaus	950	36.45%	1,535	58.90%	121	4.64%	-585	-22.45%	2,606	-5.52%
Modesto	Stanislaus	35,726	50.64%	30,388	43.07%	4,433	6.28%	5,338	7.57%	70,547	-0.99%
Newman	Stanislaus	1,612	54.61%	1,145	38.79%	195	6.61%	467	15.82%	2,952	-4.25%
Oakdale	Stanislaus	2,853	34.86%	4,843	59.18%	487	5.95%	-1,990	-24.32%	8,183	-3.89%
Patterson	Stanislaus	3,928	64.84%	1,778	29.35%	352	5.81%	2,150	35.49%	6,058	1.38%
Riverbank	Stanislaus	3,628	50.00%	3,232	44.54%	396	5.46%	396	5.46%	7,256	-3.61%
Turlock	Stanislaus	11,041	46.42%	11,195	47.07%	1,548	6.51%	-154	-0.65%	23,784	0.80%
Waterford	Stanislaus	931	36.45%	1,491	58.38%	132	5.17%	-560	-21.93%	2,554	-9.44%
Unincorporated Area	Stanislaus	13,351	39.78%	18,402	54.83%	1,810	5.39%	-5,051	-15.05%	33,563	-0.59%
Live Oak	Sutter	1,187	52.71%	914	40.59%	151	6.71%	273	12.12%	2,252	0.51%
Yuba City	Sutter	9,582	43.25%	11,199	50.55%	1,374	6.20%	-1,617	-7.30%	22,155	3.97%
Unincorporated Area	Sutter	2,307	26.03%	6,063	68.42%	492	5.55%	-3,756	-42.38%	8,862	0.74%
Corning	Tehama	747	38.72%	1,031	53.45%	151	7.83%	-284	-14.72%	1,929	-6.36%
Red Bluff	Tehama	1,480	34.02%	2,546	58.52%	325	7.47%	-1,066	-24.50%	4,351	-13.84%
Tehama	Tehama	62	35.63%	107	61.49%	5	2.87%	-45	-25.86%	174	1.04%
Unincorporated Area	Tehama	4,520	26.23%	11,810	68.54%	900	5.22%	-7,290	-42.31%	17,230	-8.69%
Unincorporated Area	Trinity	2,214	39.62%	2,812	50.32%	562	10.06%	-598	-10.70%	5,588	-9.96%
Dinuba	Tulare	2,668	60.39%	1,523	34.47%	227	5.14%	1,145	25.92%	4,418	9.19%
Exeter	Tulare	1,003	31.18%	2,015	62.64%	199	6.19%	-1,012	-31.46%	3,217	2.15%
Farmersville	Tulare	1,092	65.63%	466	28.00%	106	6.37%	626	37.62%	1,664	5.61%
Lindsay	Tulare	1,305	69.94%	451	24.17%	110	5.89%	854	45.77%	1,866	10.13%
Porterville	Tulare	5,912	48.12%	5,717	46.53%	658	5.36%	195	1.59%	12,287	5.82%
Tulare	Tulare	6,463	41.86%	8,172	52.93%	805	5.21%	-1,709	-11.07%	15,440	1.68%
Visalia	Tulare	16,260	39.42%	22,499	54.54%	2,493	6.04%	-6,239	-15.12%	41,252	4.90%
Woodlake	Tulare	879	69.16%	318	25.02%	74	5.82%	561	44.14%	1,271	-0.26%
Unincorporated Area	Tulare	12,003	39.32%	17,138	56.14%	1,384	4.53%	-5,135	-16.82%	30,525	6.12%
Sonora	Tuolumne	693	44.25%	764	48.79%	109	6.96%	-71	-4.53%	1,566	-5.44%
Unincorporated Area	Tuolumne	8,430	35.64%	13,787	58.28%	1,439	6.08%	-5,357	-22.65%	23,656	-4.96%
Camarillo	Ventura	16,239	48.94%	14,764	44.50%	2,178	6.56%	1,475	4.45%	33,181	10.75%
Fillmore	Ventura	3,015	61.73%	1,611	32.99%	258	5.28%	1,404	28.75%	4,884	8.48%
Moorpark	Ventura	8,423	50.92%	7,063	42.70%	1,055	6.38%	1,360	8.22%	16,541	12.76%
Ojai	Ventura	2,702	65.68%	1,132	27.52%	280	6.81%	1,570	38.16%	4,114	8.92%
Oxnard	Ventura	41,222	72.26%	12,692	22.25%	3,135	5.50%	28,530	50.01%	57,049	7.69%
Port Hueneme	Ventura	4,501	64.24%	2,038	29.09%	468	6.68%	2,463	35.15%	7,007	1.54%
San Buenaventura	Ventura	30,086	58.29%	17,854	34.59%	3,673	7.12%	12,232	23.70%	51,613	7.56%
Santa Paula	Ventura	6,169	67.64%	2,494	27.34%	458	5.02%	3,675	40.29%	9,121	9.50%
Simi Valley	Ventura	25,670	44.85%	28,022	48.96%	3,544	6.19%	-2,352	-4.11%	57,236	8.01%
Thousand Oaks	Ventura	33,431	52.05%	27,173	42.31%	3,626	5.65%	6,258	9.74%	64,230	15.31%
Unincorporated Area	Ventura	22,944	53.08%	17,480	40.44%	2,800	6.48%	5,464	12.64%	43,224	10.41%
Davis	Yolo	25,491	81.62%	3,650	11.69%	2,089	6.69%	21,841	69.94%	31,230	9.97%
West Sacramento	Yolo	10,598	61.34%	5,539	32.06%	1,141	6.60%	5,059	29.28%	17,278	4.19%
Winters	Yolo	1,496	58.21%	906	35.25%	168	6.54%	590	22.96%	2,570	2.07%
Woodland	Yolo	12,148	58.85%	7,045	34.13%	1,449	7.02%	5,103	24.72%	20,642	9.02%
Unincorporated Area	Yolo	5,019	54.24%	3,599	38.89%	636	6.87%	1,420	15.34%	9,254	10.55%
Marysville	Yuba	1,268	37.36%	1,870	55.10%	256	7.54%	-602	-17.74%	3,394	-7.41%
Wheatland	Yuba	377	28.73%	843	64.25%	92	7.01%	-466	-35.52%	1,312	-7.60%
Unincorporated Area	Yuba	6,265	34.72%	10,457	57.96%	1,321	7.32%	-4,192	-23.23%	18,043	-4.23%
Totals		8,753,792	62.26% (Note: Statewide candidate vote percentages and the total vote number differ here because California's Supplement to Statement of Vote does not count write in votes as part of the city totals.)	4,483,814	31.89%	823,259	5.85%	4,269,978	30.37%	14,060,865	7.21%

==== Cities and unincorporated areas that flipped from Republican to Democratic ====
- Aliso Viejo (Orange)
- Arroyo Grande (San Luis Obispo)
- Atherton (San Mateo)
- Auburn (Placer)
- Bishop (Inyo)
- Buellton (Santa Barbara)
- Camarillo (Ventura)
- Carlsbad (San Diego)
- Chino Hills (San Bernardino)
- Corona (Riverside)
- Costa Mesa (Orange)
- Cypress (Orange)
- Dos Palos (Merced)
- Escondido (San Diego)
- Folsom (Sacramento)
- Fountain Valley (Orange)
- Fullerton (Orange)
- Grand Terrace (San Bernardino)
- Hidden Hills (Los Angeles)
- Hillsborough (San Mateo)
- Industry (Los Angeles)
- La Canada Flintridge (Los Angeles)
- Laguna Woods (Orange)
- Los Alamitos (Orange)
- Moorpark (Ventura)
- Orange (Orange)
- Palos Verdes Estates (Los Angeles)
- Pismo Beach (San Luis Obispo)
- Placentia (Orange)
- Porterville (Tulare)
- Rancho Cucamonga (San Bernardino)
- Rancho Mirage (Riverside)
- Rancho Palos Verdes (Los Angeles)
- Redlands (San Bernardino)
- Reedley (Fresno)
- Rolling Hills Estates (Los Angeles)
- San Dimas (Los Angeles)
- San Marcos (San Diego)
- San Marino (Los Angeles)
- Santa Clarita (Los Angeles)
- Seal Beach (Orange)
- Thousand Oaks (Ventura)
- Unincorporated area of San Luis Obispo
- Upland (San Bernardino)
- Vista (San Diego)
- Westlake Village (Los Angeles)

==== Cities and unincorporated areas that flipped from Democratic to Republican ====
- Barstow (San Bernardino)
- Blythe (Riverside)
- Crescent City (Del Norte)
- Needles (San Bernardino)
- Sonora (Tuolumne)

== Analysis ==
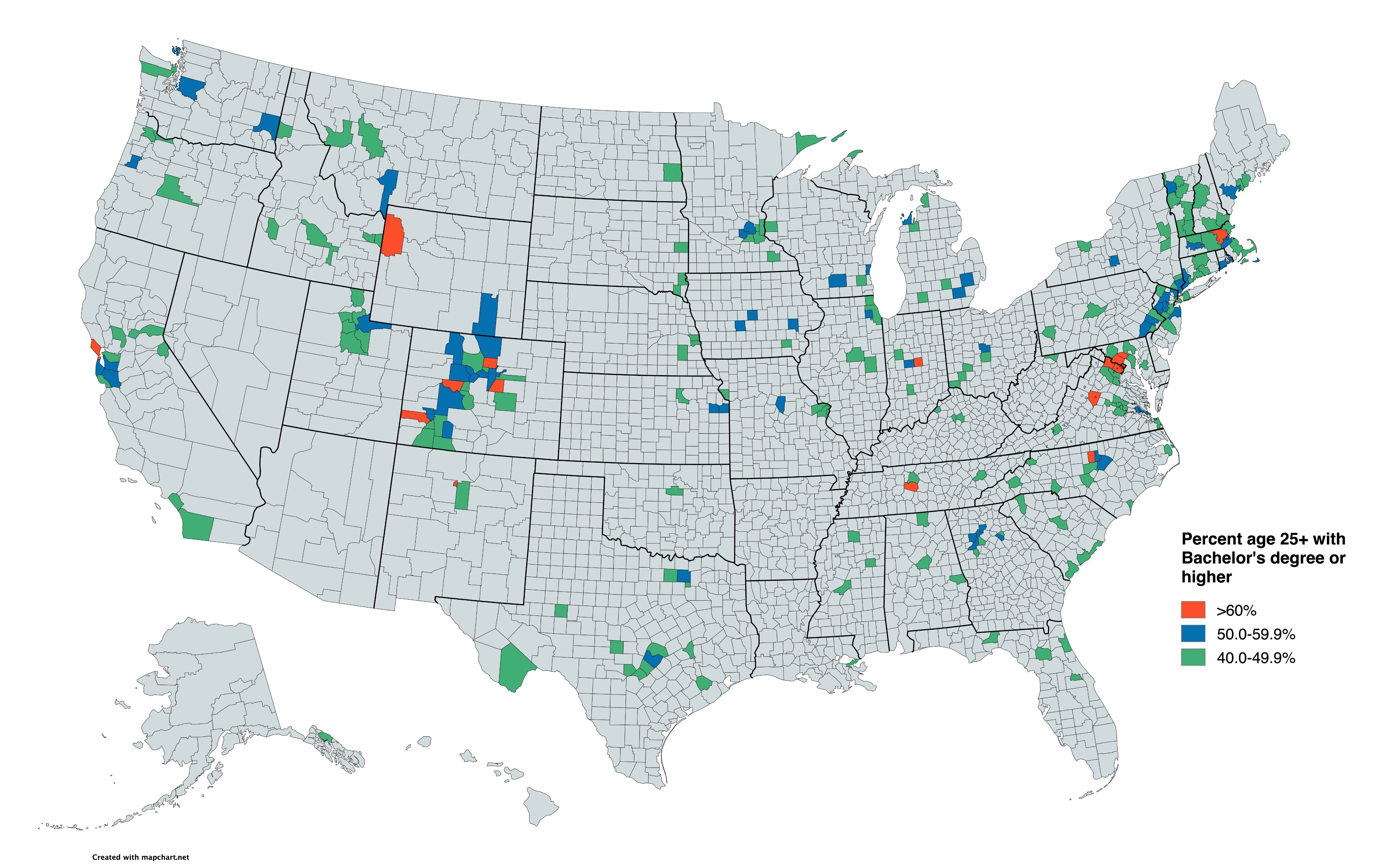
A map of the most college-educated counties in the United States

California has voted Democratic in every presidential election since Republican George H. W. Bush won the state in 1988. Clinton easily continued the Democratic tradition in California, winning the state with 61.7% of the vote, Clinton's second highest vote percentage of any state, behind Hawaii. Donald Trump received 31.6% of the vote, making for a Democratic victory margin of 30.11 points. California was one of eleven states that shifted leftward from 2012 and contributed to Clinton's national popular vote victory. (Note: The other states are Arizona, Georgia, Kansas, Maryland, Massachusetts, Texas, Utah, Virginia, and Washington state. She also outperformed Obama's 2012 showings in Nebraska's 2nd congressional district and Washington, D.C.)

The California state result was historically one of the most successful for the Democratic Party nominee by several measures, as Hillary Clinton carried California by the largest margin of any Democratic candidate since Franklin D. Roosevelt swept the state by 35.25% in his 1936 re-election landslide. Trump's 31.62% vote share in the state was the lowest for a major-party candidate in the state since John W. Davis's 8.2% in 1924. Trump became only the second nominee of either party to win the presidency without receiving at least a million votes in Los Angeles County, by far the nation's largest, since the county had first given any nominee over a million votes in 1952 (George W. Bush in 2000 having been the first). Overall, the state shifted left by nearly 7%, representing the second-strongest such shift in 2016, behind only Utah, which saw a significant third-party performance.

California was the only large state (one with at least 15 electoral votes) in which Hillary Clinton lost no counties that had been carried by Barack Obama in 2012. Indeed, she herself flipped Orange County, the largest county to switch parties in either direction in 2016, into the Democratic column; no Democrat had carried Orange County since 1936, when Franklin Roosevelt carried every county in the state. This was because California is one of the most highly-educated states in the country, with Clinton making large gains in the state's most educated counties, including Orange County.

This made Donald Trump the first Republican to win the White House without carrying Orange County since the county's founding in 1889; he also became the first Republican to win the White House without carrying Ventura County since its founding in 1872, without carrying Riverside County since its founding in 1893, without carrying San Bernardino County since Ulysses Grant in 1868, without carrying Nevada, San Diego, or San Joaquin Counties since William McKinley in 1896, without carrying San Luis Obispo County since William McKinley in 1900, and without carrying Fresno, Merced, or Stanislaus Counties since Richard Nixon in 1968.

== See also ==
- 2016 Democratic Party presidential debates and forums
- 2016 Democratic Party presidential primaries
- 2016 Republican Party presidential debates and forums
- 2016 Republican Party presidential primaries
