= 1936 United States presidential election in California =

- November 3, 1936
- Turnout: 83.36% (of registered voters) ▲2.71 pp 70.56% (of eligible voters) ▲5.34 pp

Nominee	Franklin D. Roosevelt	Alf Landon
Party	Democratic	Republican
Home state	New York	Kansas
Running mate	John N. Garner	Frank Knox
Electoral vote	22	0
Popular vote	1,766,836	836,431
Percentage	66.95%	31.70%
County results
Roosevelt
40–50%
50–60%
60–70%
70–80%
President before election
Franklin D. Roosevelt
Democratic
Elected President
Franklin D. Roosevelt
Democratic

The 1936 United States presidential election in California was held on November 3, 1936, as part of the 1936 United States presidential election. State voters chose twenty-two electors, or representatives to the Electoral College, who voted for president and vice president.

California voted for the Democratic candidate, incumbent President Franklin D. Roosevelt of New York, in a landslide over the Republican challenger, Kansas Governor Alfred Mossman Landon, carrying every county and nearly sixty-seven percent of the vote to Landon's 31.7%. Roosevelt's percentage of the vote is the highest of any presidential candidate in California history, besting Warren G. Harding’s 66.2% in 1920. While his 35.25-percentage point margin of victory over Landon is the largest for any Democratic candidate, it is the second largest overall behind Harding’s 41.92% in 1920 and ahead of his cousin Theodore Roosevelt’s 34.9% in 1904.

As of the 2024 presidential election, this is the last time that a presidential candidate from either political party completely swept all of California’s counties in an election. The only other candidate to manage this was Harding in his landslide 1920 victory.

Roosevelt was the last Democrat until Hillary Clinton in 2016 to carry Orange County in a presidential election, and the last until John Kerry in 2004 to carry Alpine County. Also, this was the only one of FDR’s four presidential campaigns where he carried Riverside County, which had never previously voted Democratic since its first election in 1896 and would not do so again until Lyndon B. Johnson in 1964. It would also be the first election in the state’s history where the Democratic Party won the state in two consecutive presidential elections.

This was the last election in California where presidential electors were chosen directly by the voters. Starting in 1940, the state adopted the modern "short ballot" where voters could only choose between the actual candidates' names, with the understanding that a vote for a candidate was a vote for their party's entire slate of electors.

== Results ==
General Election Results
Party	Pledged to	Elector	Votes
Democratic Party	Franklin D. Roosevelt	Mrs. Hancock Banning	1,766,836
Democratic Party	Franklin D. Roosevelt	O. K. Cushing	1,766,013
Democratic Party	Franklin D. Roosevelt	Leo J. Smith	1,765,958
Democratic Party	Franklin D. Roosevelt	Daniel C. Murphy	1,765,919
Democratic Party	Franklin D. Roosevelt	Charles L. Culbert	1,765,843
Democratic Party	Franklin D. Roosevelt	Mrs. George J. Knox	1,765,807
Democratic Party	Franklin D. Roosevelt	W. R. Jacob	1,765,739
Democratic Party	Franklin D. Roosevelt	George F. Irvine	1,765,680
Democratic Party	Franklin D. Roosevelt	Argyll Campbell	1,765,652
Democratic Party	Franklin D. Roosevelt	Stephen P. Galvin	1,765,651
Democratic Party	Franklin D. Roosevelt	H. H. Whitting	1,765,634
Democratic Party	Franklin D. Roosevelt	Doris McAdoo	1,765,598
Democratic Party	Franklin D. Roosevelt	Lloyd Sheldon	1,765,528
Democratic Party	Franklin D. Roosevelt	Daniel Green	1,765,429
Democratic Party	Franklin D. Roosevelt	Archibald W. Livingston	1,765,340
Democratic Party	Franklin D. Roosevelt	John H. Burke	1,765,319
Democratic Party	Franklin D. Roosevelt	Stanley S. Anderson	1,765,295
Democratic Party	Franklin D. Roosevelt	John Baumgartner	1,765,287
Democratic Party	Franklin D. Roosevelt	C. M. Brown	1,765,262
Democratic Party	Franklin D. Roosevelt	James B. Ogg	1,765,253
Democratic Party	Franklin D. Roosevelt	Charles W. McQuarrie	1,765,193
Democratic Party	Franklin D. Roosevelt	E. O. Busenburg	1,764,603
Republican Party	Alfred M. Landon	Joseph Scott	836,431
Republican Party	Alfred M. Landon	Tallant Tubbs	836,060
Republican Party	Alfred M. Landon	James G. Anderson	835,954
Republican Party	Alfred M. Landon	A. E. Goddard	835,822
Republican Party	Alfred M. Landon	Thomas M. Carlson	835,796
Republican Party	Alfred M. Landon	Charles H. Segerstrom	835,787
Republican Party	Alfred M. Landon	Thomas C. Meagher	835,767
Republican Party	Alfred M. Landon	Albert A. Rosenshine	835,761
Republican Party	Alfred M. Landon	Cecil B. DeMille	835,748
Republican Party	Alfred M. Landon	Raymond Smith	835,745
Republican Party	Alfred M. Landon	Ruth Comfort Mitchell Young	835,734
Republican Party	Alfred M. Landon	Walter H. Duval	835,713
Republican Party	Alfred M. Landon	Walter S. Hunsaker	835,713
Republican Party	Alfred M. Landon	Louis B. Mayer	835,701
Republican Party	Alfred M. Landon	Mrs. Newton Cleveland	835,689
Republican Party	Alfred M. Landon	Frank J. Buckley	835,683
Republican Party	Alfred M. Landon	Ruth Buchanan	835,651
Republican Party	Alfred M. Landon	Charlotta A. Bass	835,618
Republican Party	Alfred M. Landon	A. E. Henning	835,618
Republican Party	Alfred M. Landon	Gladys O'Donnell	835,586
Republican Party	Alfred M. Landon	Charles E. Brouse	835,535
Republican Party	Alfred M. Landon	Charles B. Wincote	835,392
Prohibition Party	D. Leigh Colvin	W. P. Fassett	12,917
Prohibition Party	D. Leigh Colvin	Minnie Goldthwaite	12,839
Prohibition Party	D. Leigh Colvin	Joseph Fusch	12,835
Prohibition Party	D. Leigh Colvin	H. A. Johnson	12,831
Prohibition Party	D. Leigh Colvin	Nellie S. Harriss	12,828
Prohibition Party	D. Leigh Colvin	Ethel Hubler	12,812
Prohibition Party	D. Leigh Colvin	Frank G. H. Stevens	12,809
Prohibition Party	D. Leigh Colvin	W. H. Easterling	12,799
Prohibition Party	D. Leigh Colvin	James P. M. Jensen	12,795
Prohibition Party	D. Leigh Colvin	John C. Bell	12,794
Prohibition Party	D. Leigh Colvin	B. C. Johnson	12,794
Prohibition Party	D. Leigh Colvin	Russell S. Dingley	12,793
Prohibition Party	D. Leigh Colvin	M. Len Hutchins	12,790
Prohibition Party	D. Leigh Colvin	Percy F. Adams	12,789
Prohibition Party	D. Leigh Colvin	Virgil G. Hinshaw	12,789
Prohibition Party	D. Leigh Colvin	Florence Jeffs	12,779
Prohibition Party	D. Leigh Colvin	William I. Hull	12,778
Prohibition Party	D. Leigh Colvin	C. B. Griffin	12,775
Prohibition Party	D. Leigh Colvin	Lucius D. Dale	12,774
Prohibition Party	D. Leigh Colvin	Errol O. Shour	12,770
Prohibition Party	D. Leigh Colvin	O. U. Hull	12,759
Prohibition Party	D. Leigh Colvin	L. B. Steward	12,753
Socialist Party	Norman Thomas	Ralph W. Musson	11,331
Socialist Party	Norman Thomas	Joseph A. Plecarpo	11,325
Socialist Party	Norman Thomas	Eva Randall	11,318
Socialist Party	Norman Thomas	Willard F. Smith	11,318
Socialist Party	Norman Thomas	Millie Shapiro	11,311
Socialist Party	Norman Thomas	Herbert L. Coggins	11,310
Socialist Party	Norman Thomas	Sybren Cornelius Zondervon	11,310
Socialist Party	Norman Thomas	Raymond H. Henderson	11,300
Socialist Party	Norman Thomas	Ernest Norback	11,300
Socialist Party	Norman Thomas	Edward V. Peterson	11,294
Socialist Party	Norman Thomas	Glen Trimble	11,290
Socialist Party	Norman Thomas	Milen Dempster	11,289
Socialist Party	Norman Thomas	B. A. Zaremba	11,287
Socialist Party	Norman Thomas	Clarence Rust	11,285
Socialist Party	Norman Thomas	Catherine McCauley	11,284
Socialist Party	Norman Thomas	Lillian Elstein	11,283
Socialist Party	Norman Thomas	A. Dutkiewicz	11,282
Socialist Party	Norman Thomas	Lyle Loomis	11,275
Socialist Party	Norman Thomas	Frank O. Rear	11,274
Socialist Party	Norman Thomas	Trelfa Lund	11,270
Socialist Party	Norman Thomas	P. Manisculo	11,270
Socialist Party	Norman Thomas	George A. Garrett	11,267
Communist Party	Earl Browder	William Schneiderman	10,877
Communist Party	Earl Browder	Louis Rosser	10,842
Communist Party	Earl Browder	Pettis Perry	10,841
Communist Party	Earl Browder	George Maurer	10,839
Communist Party	Earl Browder	Peter J. Garrison	10,827
Communist Party	Earl Browder	Thomas Cooney	10,825
Communist Party	Earl Browder	James Tormey	10,823
Communist Party	Earl Browder	Carroll Barnes	10,820
Communist Party	Earl Browder	William J. Prater	10,820
Communist Party	Earl Browder	Bessie Keckler	10,818
Communist Party	Earl Browder	E. L. Patterson	10,818
Communist Party	Earl Browder	Mini Carson	10,816
Communist Party	Earl Browder	Sam Jaye	10,816
Communist Party	Earl Browder	D. L. Saunders	10,812
Communist Party	Earl Browder	Herbert S. Elstein	10,810
Communist Party	Earl Browder	Eleanor McLauchlan	10,810
Communist Party	Earl Browder	Leon Vannier	10,810
Communist Party	Earl Browder	Henry J. Rainer	10,809
Communist Party	Earl Browder	Harry Schneider	10,809
Communist Party	Earl Browder	Alex Noral	10,808
Communist Party	Earl Browder	William A. Standridge	10,806
Communist Party	Earl Browder	Atanasio E. Torres	10,793
Write-in		Scattering	490
Votes cast (Note: Based on totals for highest elector on each ticket)			2,638,882

=== Results by county ===
County	Franklin D. Roosevelt Democratic		Alf Landon Republican		D. Leigh Colvin Prohibition		Norman Thomas Socialist		Earl Browder Communist		Scattering Write-in		Margin		Total votes cast (Note: Based on the highest elector on each ticket)
County	#	%	#	%	#	%	#	%	#	%	#	%	#	%	Total votes cast
Alameda	149,323	63.63%	82,352	35.09%	725	0.31%	1,178	0.50%	1,108	0.47%	0	0.00%	66,971	28.54%	234,686
Alpine	85	53.46%	74	46.54%	0	0.00%	0	0.00%	0	0.00%	0	0.00%	11	6.92%	159
Amador	2,506	75.41%	777	23.38%	14	0.42%	20	0.60%	6	0.18%	0	0.00%	1,729	52.03%	3,323
Butte	10,490	65.86%	5,103	32.04%	108	0.68%	130	0.82%	97	0.61%	0	0.00%	5,387	33.82%	15,928
Calaveras	2,520	71.31%	960	27.16%	17	0.48%	26	0.74%	11	0.31%	0	0.00%	1,560	44.14%	3,534
Colusa	2,965	70.38%	1,186	28.15%	34	0.81%	24	0.57%	4	0.09%	0	0.00%	1,779	42.23%	4,213
Contra Costa	26,007	72.29%	9,604	26.70%	89	0.25%	178	0.49%	97	0.27%	0	0.00%	16,403	45.60%	35,975
Del Norte	1,292	59.43%	853	39.24%	4	0.18%	18	0.83%	7	0.32%	0	0.00%	439	20.19%	2,174
El Dorado	4,019	75.66%	1,228	23.12%	18	0.34%	39	0.73%	8	0.15%	0	0.00%	2,791	52.54%	5,312
Fresno	42,859	77.75%	11,545	20.94%	334	0.61%	255	0.46%	133	0.24%	0	0.00%	31,314	56.80%	55,126
Glenn	3,288	65.97%	1,620	32.50%	39	0.78%	32	0.64%	5	0.10%	0	0.00%	1,668	33.47%	4,984
Humboldt	11,909	62.93%	6,808	35.97%	67	0.35%	93	0.49%	48	0.25%	0	0.00%	5,101	26.95%	18,925
Imperial	7,560	60.75%	4,771	38.34%	49	0.39%	26	0.21%	38	0.31%	0	0.00%	2,789	22.41%	12,444
Inyo	1,560	62.38%	912	36.47%	6	0.24%	20	0.80%	3	0.12%	0	0.00%	648	25.91%	2,501
Kern	25,726	74.61%	8,345	24.20%	146	0.42%	219	0.64%	43	0.12%	0	0.00%	17,381	50.41%	34,479
Kings	7,062	75.10%	2,226	23.67%	76	0.81%	35	0.37%	5	0.05%	0	0.00%	4,836	51.42%	9,404
Lake	1,837	49.82%	1,797	48.74%	22	0.60%	24	0.65%	7	0.19%	0	0.00%	40	1.08%	3,687
Lassen	4,193	79.47%	1,035	19.62%	18	0.34%	13	0.25%	17	0.32%	0	0.00%	3,158	59.86%	5,276
Los Angeles	757,351	67.00%	357,401	31.62%	5,827	0.52%	4,159	0.37%	5,217	0.46%	460	0.04%	399,950	35.38%	1,130,415
Madera	4,646	75.74%	1,387	22.61%	43	0.70%	36	0.59%	22	0.36%	0	0.00%	3,259	53.13%	6,134
Marin	12,152	65.43%	6,211	33.44%	39	0.21%	85	0.46%	85	0.46%	0	0.00%	5,941	31.99%	18,572
Mariposa	1,907	74.40%	621	24.23%	10	0.39%	22	0.86%	3	0.12%	0	0.00%	1,286	50.18%	2,563
Mendocino	6,432	62.65%	3,670	35.75%	33	0.32%	68	0.66%	63	0.61%	0	0.00%	2,762	26.90%	10,266
Merced	9,208	72.69%	3,230	25.50%	108	0.85%	91	0.72%	31	0.24%	0	0.00%	5,978	47.19%	12,668
Modoc	1,828	64.57%	968	34.19%	16	0.57%	7	0.25%	12	0.42%	0	0.00%	860	30.38%	2,831
Mono	458	64.78%	241	34.09%	0	0.00%	6	0.85%	2	0.28%	0	0.00%	217	30.69%	707
Monterey	12,267	61.13%	7,565	37.70%	79	0.39%	101	0.50%	55	0.27%	0	0.00%	4,702	23.43%	20,067
Napa	6,270	60.35%	3,973	38.24%	52	0.50%	78	0.75%	17	0.16%	0	0.00%	2,297	22.11%	10,390
Nevada	5,128	71.91%	1,913	26.83%	16	0.22%	59	0.83%	15	0.21%	0	0.00%	3,215	45.08%	7,131
Orange	29,836	55.00%	23,494	43.31%	535	0.99%	237	0.44%	149	0.27%	0	0.00%	6,342	11.69%	54,251
Placer	7,959	76.62%	2,321	22.34%	35	0.34%	52	0.50%	21	0.20%	0	0.00%	5,638	54.27%	10,388
Plumas	2,707	78.81%	680	19.80%	14	0.41%	14	0.41%	20	0.58%	0	0.00%	2,027	59.01%	3,435
Riverside	17,011	49.88%	16,674	48.89%	200	0.59%	181	0.53%	41	0.12%	0	0.00%	337	0.99%	34,107
Sacramento	47,265	78.53%	12,119	20.14%	241	0.40%	303	0.50%	247	0.41%	9	0.01%	35,146	58.40%	60,184
San Benito	2,565	61.93%	1,515	36.58%	12	0.29%	31	0.75%	19	0.46%	0	0.00%	1,050	25.35%	4,142
San Bernardino	33,955	59.55%	22,219	38.97%	461	0.81%	212	0.37%	169	0.30%	0	0.00%	11,736	20.58%	57,016
San Diego	64,628	63.45%	35,686	35.04%	579	0.57%	524	0.51%	437	0.43%	0	0.00%	28,942	28.42%	101,854
San Francisco	196,197	74.04%	65,436	24.69%	1,227	0.46%	757	0.29%	1,366	0.52%	18	0.01%	130,761	49.34%	265,001
San Joaquin	29,078	73.20%	10,172	25.61%	159	0.40%	210	0.53%	104	0.26%	0	0.00%	18,906	47.59%	39,723
San Luis Obispo	7,889	61.13%	4,812	37.28%	90	0.70%	75	0.58%	40	0.31%	0	0.00%	3,077	23.84%	12,906
San Mateo	27,087	65.67%	13,650	33.09%	81	0.20%	253	0.61%	177	0.43%	0	0.00%	13,437	32.58%	41,248
Santa Barbara	15,923	61.14%	9,728	37.35%	91	0.35%	164	0.63%	138	0.53%	1	0.00%	6,195	23.79%	26,045
Santa Clara	38,346	58.48%	26,498	40.41%	160	0.24%	399	0.61%	173	0.26%	0	0.00%	11,848	18.07%	65,576
Santa Cruz	9,326	52.08%	8,260	46.12%	82	0.46%	120	0.67%	120	0.67%	0	0.00%	1,066	5.95%	17,908
Shasta	5,236	69.72%	2,159	28.75%	42	0.56%	35	0.47%	38	0.51%	0	0.00%	3,077	40.97%	7,510
Sierra	1,152	76.44%	340	22.56%	6	0.40%	4	0.27%	5	0.33%	0	0.00%	812	53.88%	1,507
Siskiyou	6,865	69.28%	2,919	29.46%	42	0.42%	50	0.50%	33	0.33%	0	0.00%	3,946	39.82%	9,909
Solano	13,459	78.05%	3,603	20.89%	66	0.38%	69	0.40%	47	0.27%	0	0.00%	9,856	57.16%	17,244
Sonoma	17,273	60.17%	11,185	38.96%	65	0.23%	83	0.29%	100	0.35%	0	0.00%	6,088	21.21%	28,706
Stanislaus	15,341	63.13%	8,613	35.44%	190	0.78%	80	0.33%	78	0.32%	0	0.00%	6,728	27.68%	24,302
Sutter	4,019	70.04%	1,613	28.11%	35	0.61%	56	0.98%	15	0.26%	0	0.00%	2,406	41.93%	5,738
Tehama	3,687	59.68%	2,376	38.46%	64	1.04%	43	0.70%	8	0.13%	0	0.00%	1,311	21.22%	6,178
Trinity	1,424	67.11%	655	30.87%	13	0.61%	7	0.33%	23	1.08%	0	0.00%	769	36.24%	2,122
Tulare	18,956	67.66%	8,624	30.78%	265	0.95%	115	0.41%	55	0.20%	0	0.00%	10,332	36.88%	28,015
Tuolumne	3,303	72.72%	1,199	26.40%	5	0.11%	28	0.62%	7	0.15%	0	0.00%	2,104	46.32%	4,542
Ventura	13,384	63.14%	7,579	35.75%	97	0.46%	94	0.44%	42	0.20%	2	0.01%	5,805	27.38%	21,198
Yolo	5,992	68.94%	2,594	29.84%	44	0.51%	47	0.54%	15	0.17%	0	0.00%	3,398	39.09%	8,692
Yuba	4,125	74.18%	1,332	23.95%	27	0.49%	46	0.83%	31	0.56%	0	0.00%	2,793	50.22%	5,561
Total	1,766,836	66.95%	836,431	31.70%	12,917	0.49%	11,331	0.43%	10,877	0.41%	490	0.02%	930,405	35.26%	2,638,882

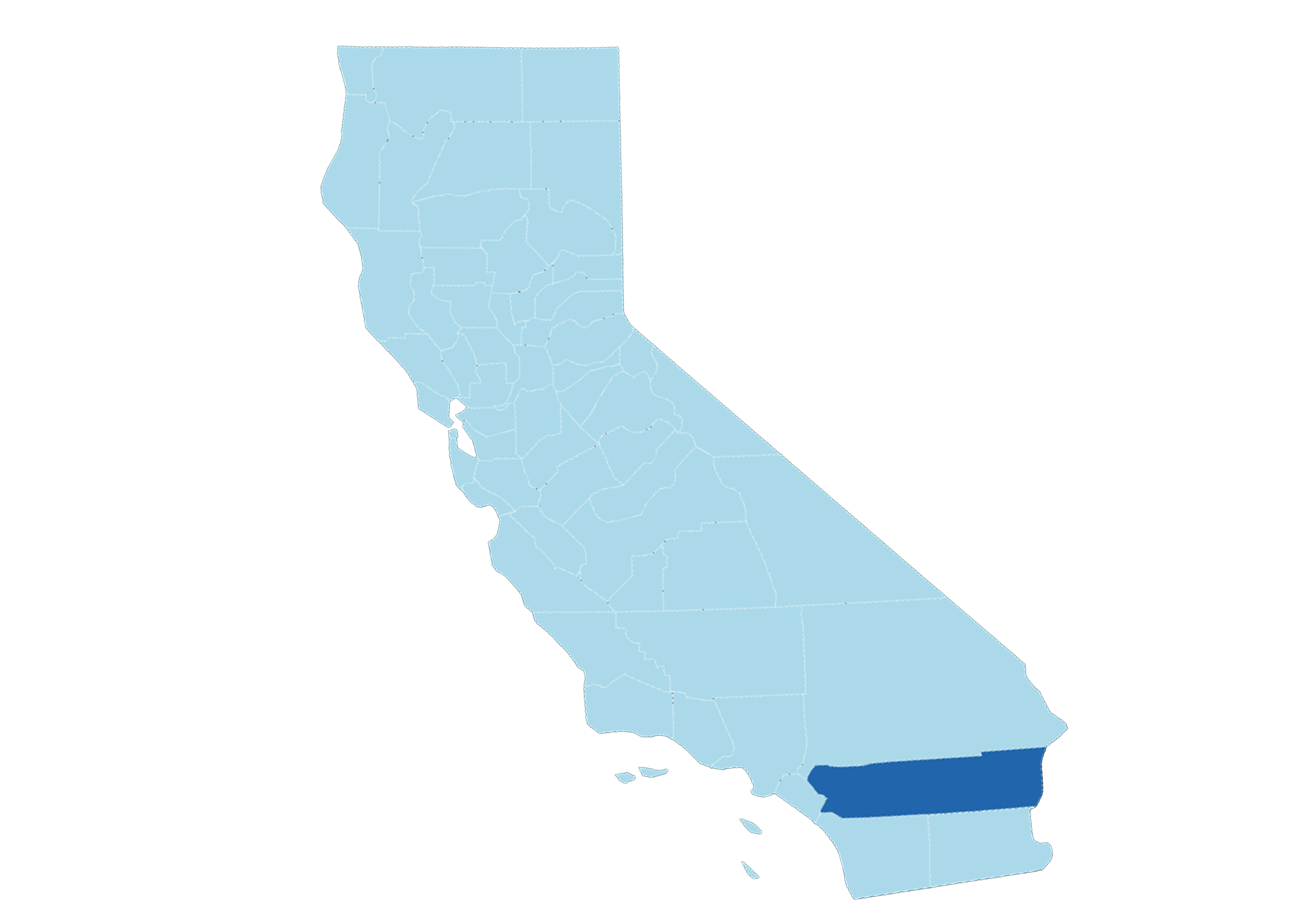
County flips from 1932: Democratic Hold Gain from Republican

==== Counties that flipped from Republican to Democratic ====
- Riverside
