= 1940 United States presidential election in California =

- November 5, 1940
- Turnout: 81.44% (of registered voters) ▼1.92 pp 78.32% (of eligible voters) ▲7.76 pp

Nominee	Franklin D. Roosevelt	Wendell Willkie
Party	Democratic	Republican
Home state	New York	New York
Running mate	Henry A. Wallace	Charles L. McNary
Electoral vote	22	0
Popular vote	1,877,618	1,351,419
Percentage	57.44%	41.34%
County results
Roosevelt
40–50%
50–60%
60–70%
70–80%
Willkie
50–60%
60–70%
President before election
Franklin D. Roosevelt
Democratic
Elected President
Franklin D. Roosevelt
Democratic

The 1940 United States presidential election in California took place on November 5, 1940, as part of the 1940 United States presidential election. State voters chose 22 representatives, or electors, to the Electoral College, who voted for president and vice president.

California voted for the Democratic incumbent, Franklin Roosevelt, over the Republican challenger, businessman Wendell Willkie.

Willkie did nonetheless make considerable gains vis-à-vis the previous Republican nominee, Alf Landon, who remains the solitary Republican nominee to not carry a single county in the state. Willkie carried seven counties scattered across the state and gained ten percentage points on Landon's performance.

This is the last election where the Democrats won Sutter County, which, as of the 2024 presidential election, stands as the longest run voting for one party by any California county. Mono County would not vote Democratic again until John Kerry in 2004.

== Results ==
1940 United States presidential election in California
Party	Candidate	Votes	Percentage	Electoral votes
Democratic	Franklin D. Roosevelt (incumbent)	1,877,618	57.44%	22
Republican	Wendell Willkie	1,351,419	41.34%	0
Progressive (Note: Thomas was the Socialist nominee on the national ticket but in California ran on the "Progressive" ticket. This Progressive Party is different both Theodore Roosevelt's Bull Moose Party and Robert M. La Follette's Progressive Party)	Norman Thomas	16,506	0.50%	0
Communist	Earl Russell Browder	13,586	0.42%	0
Prohibition	Roger Babson	9,400	0.29%	0
No party	Write-ins	262	0.01%	0
Invalid or blank votes				—
Totals		3,268,791	100.00%	22
Voter turnout				—

=== Results by county ===
County	Franklin D. Roosevelt Democratic		Wendell Willkie Republican		Norman Thomas Progressive		Earl Browder Communist		Roger Babson Prohibition		Scattering Write-in		Margin		Total votes cast
County	#	%	#	%	#	%	#	%	#	%	#	%	#	%	Total votes cast
Alameda	148,224	55.21%	116,961	43.56%	1,618	0.60%	1,285	0.48%	408	0.15%	0	0.00%	31,263	11.64%	268,496
Alpine	62	32.98%	125	66.49%	0	0.00%	1	0.53%	0	0.00%	0	0.00%	-63	-33.51%	188
Amador	2,762	66.14%	1,372	32.85%	15	0.36%	9	0.22%	18	0.43%	0	0.00%	1,390	33.29%	4,176
Butte	10,684	58.15%	7,433	40.46%	117	0.64%	77	0.42%	61	0.33%	0	0.00%	3,251	17.70%	18,372
Calaveras	2,405	58.90%	1,649	40.39%	21	0.51%	4	0.10%	4	0.10%	0	0.00%	756	18.52%	4,083
Colusa	2,655	59.48%	1,774	39.74%	15	0.34%	5	0.11%	15	0.34%	0	0.00%	881	19.74%	4,464
Contra Costa	30,900	61.75%	18,627	37.22%	238	0.48%	209	0.42%	63	0.13%	3	0.01%	12,273	24.53%	50,040
Del Norte	1,034	44.92%	1,233	53.56%	26	1.13%	5	0.22%	4	0.17%	0	0.00%	-199	-8.64%	2,302
El Dorado	4,144	66.44%	2,019	32.37%	37	0.59%	15	0.24%	22	0.35%	0	0.00%	2,125	34.07%	6,237
Fresno	48,866	69.07%	21,079	29.79%	354	0.50%	143	0.20%	308	0.44%	0	0.00%	27,787	39.27%	70,750
Glenn	3,095	54.96%	2,473	43.92%	31	0.55%	2	0.04%	30	0.53%	0	0.00%	622	11.05%	5,631
Humboldt	12,329	55.98%	9,470	43.00%	92	0.42%	78	0.35%	55	0.25%	0	0.00%	2,859	12.98%	22,024
Imperial	7,728	52.53%	6,854	46.59%	64	0.44%	25	0.17%	41	0.28%	0	0.00%	874	5.94%	14,712
Inyo	1,820	54.65%	1,483	44.53%	12	0.36%	3	0.09%	12	0.36%	0	0.00%	337	10.12%	3,330
Kern	32,202	61.78%	19,445	37.30%	219	0.42%	106	0.20%	154	0.30%	0	0.00%	12,757	24.47%	52,126
Kings	8,307	67.43%	3,911	31.75%	41	0.33%	9	0.07%	52	0.42%	0	0.00%	4,396	35.68%	12,320
Lake	1,897	45.70%	2,215	53.36%	23	0.55%	5	0.12%	11	0.26%	0	0.00%	-318	-7.66%	4,151
Lassen	4,367	69.17%	1,902	30.13%	20	0.32%	11	0.17%	13	0.21%	0	0.00%	2,465	39.05%	6,313
Los Angeles	822,718	58.13%	574,266	40.58%	6,971	0.49%	6,914	0.49%	4,151	0.29%	249	0.02%	248,452	17.56%	1,415,269
Madera	5,749	67.61%	2,653	31.20%	32	0.38%	35	0.41%	34	0.40%	0	0.00%	3,096	36.41%	8,503
Marin	11,365	50.20%	10,974	48.47%	151	0.67%	130	0.57%	20	0.09%	0	0.00%	391	1.73%	22,640
Mariposa	1,935	64.44%	1,035	34.47%	13	0.43%	11	0.37%	9	0.30%	0	0.00%	900	29.97%	3,003
Mendocino	7,055	56.13%	5,345	42.53%	70	0.56%	66	0.53%	33	0.26%	0	0.00%	1,710	13.60%	12,569
Merced	10,501	62.57%	6,101	36.35%	84	0.50%	27	0.16%	71	0.42%	0	0.00%	4,400	26.22%	16,784
Modoc	2,232	61.49%	1,371	37.77%	14	0.39%	4	0.11%	6	0.17%	3	0.08%	861	23.72%	3,630
Mono	523	52.56%	459	46.13%	2	0.20%	5	0.50%	6	0.60%	0	0.00%	64	6.43%	995
Monterey	14,758	55.00%	11,810	44.01%	120	0.45%	76	0.28%	69	0.26%	0	0.00%	2,948	10.99%	26,833
Napa	6,771	52.68%	5,924	46.09%	60	0.47%	34	0.26%	64	0.50%	0	0.00%	847	6.59%	12,853
Nevada	5,782	66.01%	2,863	32.69%	57	0.65%	27	0.31%	30	0.34%	0	0.00%	2,919	33.33%	8,759
Orange	28,236	43.44%	36,070	55.49%	255	0.39%	82	0.13%	354	0.54%	0	0.00%	-7,834	-12.05%	64,997
Placer	8,402	67.56%	3,887	31.26%	73	0.59%	35	0.28%	39	0.31%	0	0.00%	4,515	36.31%	12,436
Plumas	3,418	72.11%	1,270	26.79%	34	0.72%	10	0.21%	8	0.17%	0	0.00%	2,148	45.32%	4,740
Riverside	20,003	47.20%	21,779	51.39%	197	0.46%	56	0.13%	345	0.81%	0	0.00%	-1,776	-4.19%	42,380
Sacramento	51,351	68.09%	23,201	30.76%	452	0.60%	225	0.30%	187	0.25%	0	0.00%	28,150	37.33%	75,416
San Benito	2,441	49.99%	2,407	49.29%	17	0.35%	11	0.23%	7	0.14%	0	0.00%	34	0.70%	4,883
San Bernardino	37,520	54.47%	30,511	44.30%	320	0.46%	138	0.20%	389	0.56%	0	0.00%	7,009	10.18%	68,878
San Diego	71,188	55.57%	55,434	43.27%	684	0.53%	348	0.27%	456	0.36%	0	0.00%	15,754	12.30%	128,110
San Francisco	185,607	59.51%	122,449	39.26%	1,513	0.49%	1,935	0.62%	374	0.12%	0	0.00%	63,158	20.25%	311,878
San Joaquin	26,536	52.55%	23,403	46.34%	239	0.47%	141	0.28%	179	0.35%	0	0.00%	3,133	6.20%	50,498
San Luis Obispo	8,499	53.39%	7,204	45.25%	79	0.50%	67	0.42%	71	0.45%	0	0.00%	1,295	8.13%	15,920
San Mateo	29,831	52.38%	26,539	46.60%	290	0.51%	211	0.37%	80	0.14%	0	0.00%	3,292	5.78%	56,951
Santa Barbara	17,237	54.41%	14,107	44.53%	182	0.57%	91	0.29%	61	0.19%	0	0.00%	3,130	9.88%	31,678
Santa Clara	40,449	49.63%	40,100	49.20%	458	0.56%	294	0.36%	195	0.24%	0	0.00%	349	0.43%	81,496
Santa Cruz	10,683	47.51%	11,453	50.93%	175	0.78%	71	0.32%	104	0.46%	0	0.00%	-770	-3.42%	22,486
Shasta	8,662	68.03%	3,909	30.70%	66	0.52%	71	0.56%	25	0.20%	0	0.00%	4,753	37.33%	12,733
Sierra	1,057	66.98%	511	32.38%	7	0.44%	2	0.13%	1	0.06%	0	0.00%	546	34.60%	1,578
Siskiyou	7,714	63.17%	4,387	35.92%	56	0.46%	18	0.15%	36	0.29%	1	0.01%	3,327	27.24%	12,212
Solano	15,054	70.58%	6,081	28.51%	83	0.39%	53	0.25%	57	0.27%	0	0.00%	8,973	42.07%	21,328
Sonoma	15,230	47.04%	16,819	51.94%	145	0.45%	119	0.37%	60	0.19%	6	0.02%	-1,589	-4.91%	32,379
Stanislaus	16,494	51.96%	14,803	46.63%	155	0.49%	58	0.18%	236	0.74%	0	0.00%	1,691	5.33%	31,746
Sutter	4,195	57.11%	3,089	42.06%	26	0.35%	15	0.20%	20	0.27%	0	0.00%	1,106	15.06%	7,345
Tehama	3,618	54.59%	2,913	43.95%	53	0.80%	13	0.20%	31	0.47%	0	0.00%	705	10.64%	6,628
Trinity	1,431	63.83%	780	34.79%	12	0.54%	15	0.67%	4	0.18%	0	0.00%	651	29.04%	2,242
Tulare	20,129	55.96%	15,414	42.85%	209	0.58%	41	0.11%	178	0.49%	0	0.00%	4,715	13.11%	35,971
Tuolumne	3,541	62.96%	2,004	35.63%	27	0.48%	29	0.52%	23	0.41%	0	0.00%	1,537	27.33%	5,624
Ventura	15,182	57.00%	11,225	42.15%	84	0.32%	64	0.24%	79	0.30%	0	0.00%	3,957	14.86%	26,634
Yolo	6,380	58.78%	4,373	40.29%	63	0.58%	19	0.18%	19	0.18%	0	0.00%	2,007	18.49%	10,854
Yuba	4,660	64.57%	2,471	34.24%	35	0.48%	33	0.46%	18	0.25%	0	0.00%	2,189	30.33%	7,217
Total	1,877,618	57.44%	1,351,419	41.34%	16,506	0.50%	13,586	0.42%	9,400	0.29%	262	0.01%	526,199	16.10%	3,268,791

=== Electors ===
Up through 1936, voters in California chose presidential electors directly. Starting in 1940, however, California adopted the modern "short ballot" where voters select from the actual candidates' names and each vote is treated as being for a candidate and his or her party's entire slate of electors. The individuals below were nominated by each party to serve as the state's members of the 1940 Electoral College should their party's ticket win the state:

Franklin D. Roosevelt & Henry A. Wallace Democratic Party	Wendell Willkie & Charles L. McNary Republican Party	Norman Thomas & Maynard Krueger Progressive Party	Earl Browder & James W. Ford Communist Party	Roger Babson & Edgar V. Moorman Prohibition Party
C. M. Brown; Mrs. J. Frank Burke; Charles L. Culbert; Phil Davies; Hugh P. Donnelly; A. D. Erickson; John W. Evans; Mrs. O. P. Hanna; Edward Henderson; George C. Highley; Carl E. Johnston; James Kehoen; Mrs. George J. Knox; Elmer E. Lore; Clarence J. Novotny; Ann Patton; Charles J. Powers; Clyde C. Redwine; Harry See; Jack B. Tenney; Vincent Thomas; C. V. Whited	Joseph Bancroft; Mariana Bertola; Ralph W. Bull; H. L. Carnahan; Bartley W. Cavanaugh; Ford A. Chatters; Robert M. Clarke; Mrs. Jorn D. Fredericks; Betty Hill; Harold C. Holmes Jr.; Norman Huston; Edgar A. Luce; Jesse M. Mayo; Alexander McCabe; D. Jack Metzger; John Francis Neylan; Kathryn Niehouse; Olivia M. Redwine; Theodore J. Roche; Joseph Scott; William R. Sharkey; W. B. Williams	George Aranov; Erma Arnstein; Sigmund Arywitz; Herbert L. Coggins; Allan Darby; Alfred Fisk; Lilian Goodman; Bernice E. Harding; Otis Linn; Arvid Nelson; Margaret Paine; Joseph Plecarpo; Margaret Pomeroy; Gerald M. Rubin; Clarence E. Rust; Evelyn J. Sessions; Millie Shapiro; Willard F. Smith; W. Hilton Smith; Blanche F. Tipton; Andrew V. Tuvinall; Gilbert L. Willhite	Louretta Adams; George Ashby; Leo Baroway; Archie Brown; Emil Freed; Charles Gricus; Newell Johnson; Walter Lambert; Albert J. Lima; James McLean; Jack Moore; Elizabeth Nicholas; Clarence Paton; Pettis Perry; John Pollki; Esco Richardson; George Sandy; Celeste Strack; Anita Whitney; Allan Yates; Oleta Yates; Adele Young	Percy F. Adams; Lambert T. Adell; Russell S. Dingley; W. H. Easterling; J. W. Farr; W. P. Fassett; Joseph Fusch; Nellie S. Harriss; Virgil G. Hinshaw; E. Dow Hoffman; B. O. Hoover; Ethel Hubler; Gilbert G. Hudson; O. U. Hull; William I. Hull; J. C. Jeter; H. A. Johnson; Bertha Jones; Mary Stark Kerr; Frank G. H. Stevens; L. B. Steward; Edward P. Webster
