= National Register of Historic Places listings in Sutter County, California =

Location of Sutter County in California

This is a list of the National Register of Historic Places listings in Sutter County, California.

This is intended to be a detailed list of the properties on the National Register of Historic Places in Sutter County, California, United States. Latitude and longitude coordinates are provided for many National Register properties and districts; these locations may be seen together in an online map.

There are 3 properties listed on the National Register in the county.

This National Park Service list is complete through NPS recent listings posted September 4, 2026.

== Current listings ==
	Name on the Register	Image	Date listed	Location	City or town	Description
1	Live Oak Historic Commercial District	Live Oak Historic Commercial District	January 23, 1998 (#97001657)	Along Broadway between Pennington Rd. and Elm St. 39°16′30″N 121°39′38″W	Live Oak	
2	Vernon School		November 6, 2020 (#100005737)	Jct. of Garden Hwy. and Vernon Rd. 38°47′10″N 121°37′07″W	Verona vicinity	
3	West Butte Schoolhouse	West Butte Schoolhouse	April 19, 2016 (#16000167)	14226 Pass Rd. 39°11′11″N 121°52′44″W	Live Oak	One-room schoolhouse built in 1909, to replace 1860 one destroyed by a fire.

== See also ==
- List of National Historic Landmarks in California
- National Register of Historic Places listings in California
- California Historical Landmarks in Sutter County, California
