= Sutter County Library =

Public library system in California, US

Sutter County Library (formerly called the Sutter County Free Library) is a public library system that serves the residents of Sutter County, California. It operates four branches throughout the county including the main branch located in Yuba City, California.

== Background ==
The library celebrated its centennial in 2017. The library's original building was acquired, renovated and filled with books for use as a library at a cost of $6,437.00 in 1927 when the county's population was 10,115. The funds came from the county's general fund and school budgets. In 2017 the library had over 40,000 cardholders, and the population of Sutter County as of 2010 was 94,737.

The Sutter County library system offers a wide range of programs, including literacy programs, citizenship and English literacy classes for immigrants applying for naturalization, and children's activities including programs that help them gain reading skills.

== Branches ==
- Main Branch in Yuba City, California
- Barber Branch in Live Oak, Sutter County, California
- Sutter Branch in Sutter, California
