= East Nicolaus High School =

Public high school in California, United States

Coordinates: 38.9114°N 121.5268°W

East Nicolaus High School (ENHS) is in East Nicolaus, California in Sutter County, California. It has about 300 students. About 2/3 are white, a quarter hispanic, and the rest other ethnicities. It is on Nicolaus Avenue. It is in the East Nicolaus Joint Unified High School District. The school is 25 miles north of Sacramento. The small school has been known as a football powerhouse. In 2015, its football team became the first from Northern California to win a state championship. The school is in an agricultural area of rice fields and almond orchards.

In 1931, the principal and some students visited the California Senate and were given the privilege of the floor.

Spartans are the school mascot. The school colors are red, white, and black. From 1964 to 1998 Geoff Wahl was the school's football coach. The team won four sectional titles and was palyong for a fifth in 2019. The school's volleyball team competes in the Sacramento Valley League of the Northern Section of the California Interscholastic Federation (CIF). The team won three straight sectional titles.

In 2017 the football team beat Durham High School to win the sectional championship.

== Alumni ==
- James Gallagher (California politician), Republican Minority Leader in the California Assembly
- Wally Herger former U.S. Representative for California

== See also ==
- List of high schools in California
