= Christopher Chandler (politician) =

American politician (born 1951)

Judge of the Sutter County Superior Court
- In office 1998 – May 31, 2016

Judge of the Sutter County Municipal Court
- In office 1993–1998

Member of the California State Assembly from the 3rd district
- In office December 1, 1986 – December 7, 1992
- Preceded by: Wally Herger
- Succeeded by: Bernie Richter

Personal details
- Born: Christopher Ray Chandler; January 20, 1951 (age 75) Marysville, California, U.S.
- Party: Republican
- Spouse: Cindy (after 1975)
- Children: 3
- Education: University of California, Davis (BA); University of the Pacific (JD)

Christopher Ray Chandler (born January 20, 1951) is an American lawyer, politician, and former judge. He is a former Sutter County Superior Court judge, and a former member of the California State Assembly from the 3rd district from 1986 to 1992.

== Education ==
He graduated from University of California, Davis with a Bachelor of Arts in 1973 and from the University of the Pacific McGeorge School of Law with a Juris Doctor in 1976.

== Family ==
He is the son of former Sutter County Supervisor Roger Chandler and Lois Jacqueline Kofahl. His great grandfather was Wilber Fisk Chandler, a five-term member of the California Assembly and one-term member of the California Senate from Fresno County.

== Political career ==
In 1984, he was Sutter County chairman of the Reagan-Bush Campaign.

=== California Assembly, 3rd district ===
In 1986, he defeated Democrat Floyd Myers Marsh for the 3rd district assembly seat. In 1988, he defeated Democrat Bruce Conklin and Libertarian Mark Sweany. In 1990, he defeated Democrat Lon Hatamiya. He did not run for reelection in 1992.

== Judicial career ==
In 1993, he was appointed as a judge of the Sutter County Municipal Court. He served as a Superior Court judge from his appointment in 1998 until his retirement on May 31, 2016.

== Personal life ==
He and his wife Cindy have three children.

Preceded by Wally Herger	Member of the California State Assembly from the 3rd district 1986–1992	Succeeded by Bernie Richter
