= West Butte Schoolhouse =

- U.S. National Register of Historic Places
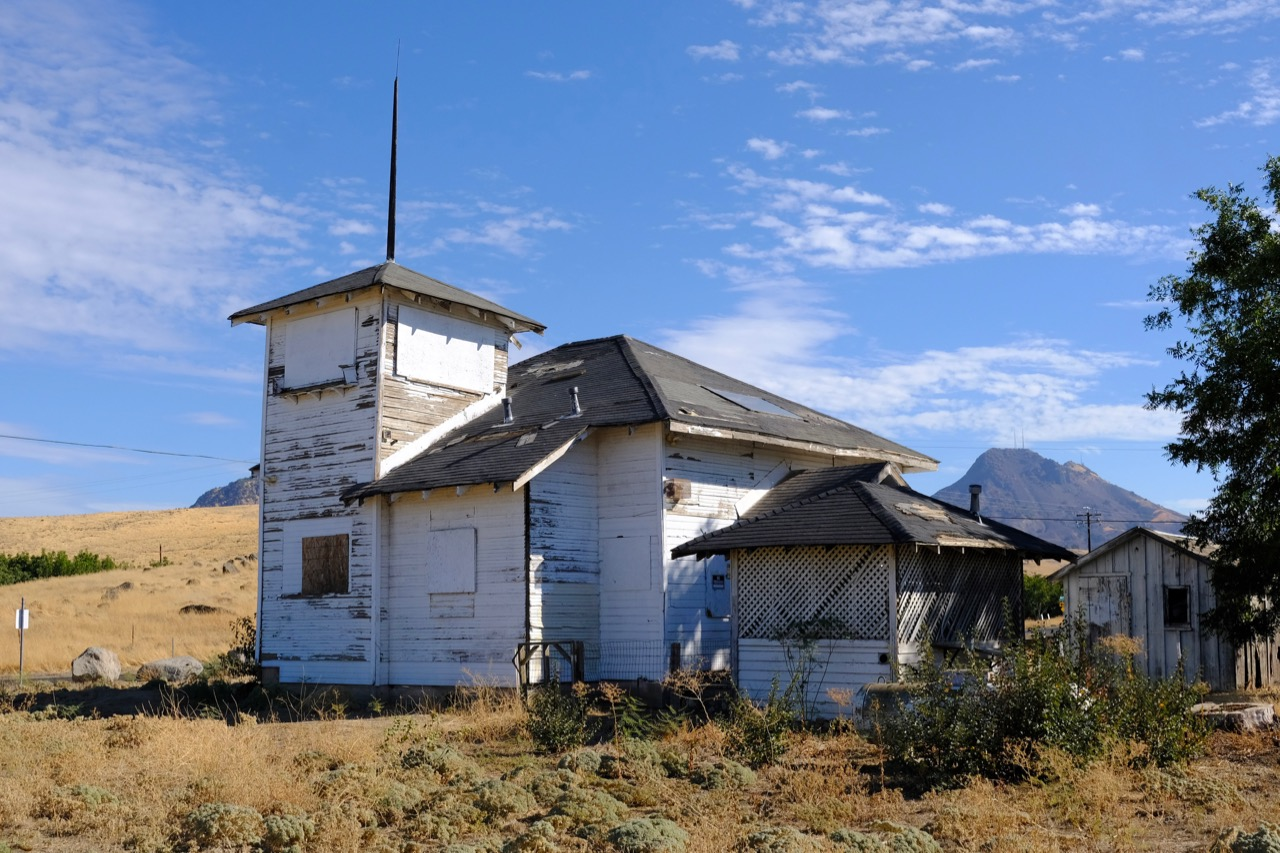

- Location within California
- Location: 14226 Pass Rd., Live Oak, Sutter County, California
- Coordinates: 39.186472°N 121.878933°W
- Area: .81 acres (0.33 ha)
- Built: 1909
- NRHP reference No.: 16000167
- Added to NRHP: April 19, 2016

The West Butte Schoolhouse, in Sutter County, California near Live Oak, was listed on the National Register of Historic Places in 2016.

== Description and location ==
It is a one-room schoolhouse built in 1909, to replace an 1860 schoolhouse destroyed by a fire in 1908. Its classroom was about 23 by 28 feet (7.0 m × 8.5 m) in plan, with a ceiling about 13 feet (4.0 m) high.

It was used as a residence after 1943.

It is located at 14226 Pass Rd. near Live Oak.

The listing included two contributing structures: a well house with compatible architecture, and a board & batten storage shed.
