= Live Oak Historic Commercial District =

Historic district in California, United States

- U.S. National Register of Historic Places
- U.S. Historic district
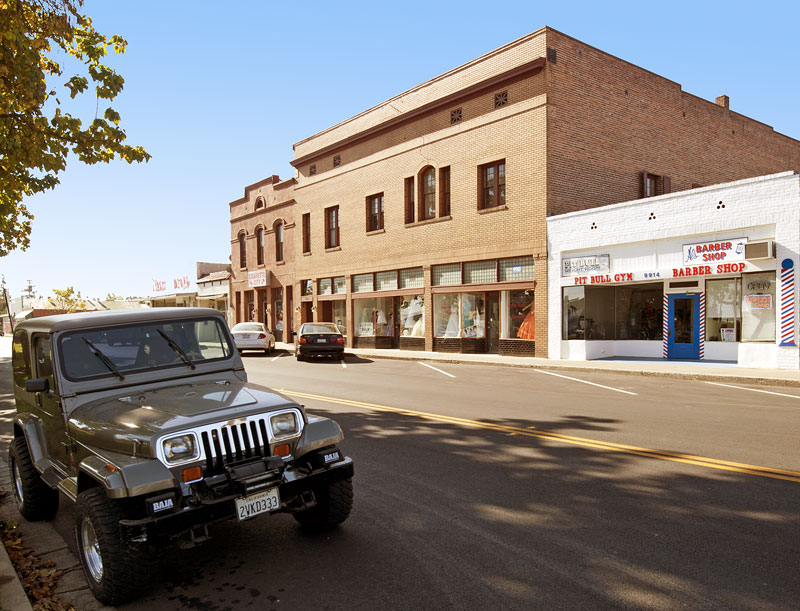

- Location within California Location within the United States
- Location: Along Broadway between Pennington Rd. and Elm St., Live Oak, California
- Coordinates: 39°16′30″N 121°39′38″W
- Area: 8.8 acres (3.6 ha)
- Architectural style: Classical Revival, Italianate, Mission/Spanish Revival
- NRHP reference No.: 97001657
- Added to NRHP: January 23, 1998

The Live Oak Historic Commercial District is a historic district in downtown Live Oak, Sutter County, California. The district includes twelve buildings and a row of palm trees; eight of the buildings and the trees contribute to the district's historical significance. Most of the buildings in the district are commercial buildings, though an Odd Fellows hall and a civic hall are also included. The oldest building in the district, the Live Oak Hall, was built circa 1875, while the latest buildings were built in the 1920s. The buildings in the district are mainly built in brick and stucco, and their designs reflect the periods in which they were built; for instance, the Live Oak Hall has narrow, arched windows popular in the 1870s, and the 1920s buildings have distinctive period brickwork.

The district was added to the National Register of Historic Places on January 23, 1998.
