= Sutter Union High School =

Location
- 2665 Acacia St; Sutter, California 95982; 39.16588°N 121.75422°W

Information
- Type: Public
- Established: 1893
- School district: Sutter Union High School District
- Principal: Robert Bennette
- Teaching staff: 35.15 (FTE)
- Grades: 9-12
- Enrollment: 768 (2023-2024)
- Student to teacher ratio: 21.85
- Colors: White, gold, and blue
- Mascot: Husky
- Rival: Wheatland High School
- Website: www.sutterhuskies.com

Sutter Union High School is a small rural high school located in Sutter, California.

== History ==
The high school opened in 1893 with only 18 students. Over 100 years later the school has grown to 700 students and grows with each passing year. This high school differs from others in the county because of its rural location in the Yuba–Sutter area.

== Athletics ==
Sutter Union High School is well known in the Yuba–Sutter area for its continued success in football, volleyball, girls soccer, baseball and softball. These teams have each won a Northern Section Championship in the past season. The wrestling team has also won 2 section championships and various league titles, and the softball team has also won Northern Section titles.

The high school offers many different sports, but significantly fewer than the larger schools in the area.

Athletic offerings by gender:

Girls: Volleyball, Tennis, Softball, Basketball, Soccer, Cheerleading.
Boys: Football, Basketball, Baseball, Soccer, Tennis.
Co-Ed: Cross-Country, Track, Rifle Team, Wrestling, Swimming, Trap Team, Golf.

In 2025, the Sutter High School football team played in a state championship game for the first time in the history of the school.

== Notable alumni ==
- Guy Branum, head writer and performer on X-Play
- Leanne Marshall, Season 5 winner of Project Runway on Bravo
- Logan Seavey, NASCAR, ARCA, USAC, POWRi driver
- Don Young, Alaska's only congressman from 1973-2022.
