= Community Memorial Museum of Sutter County =

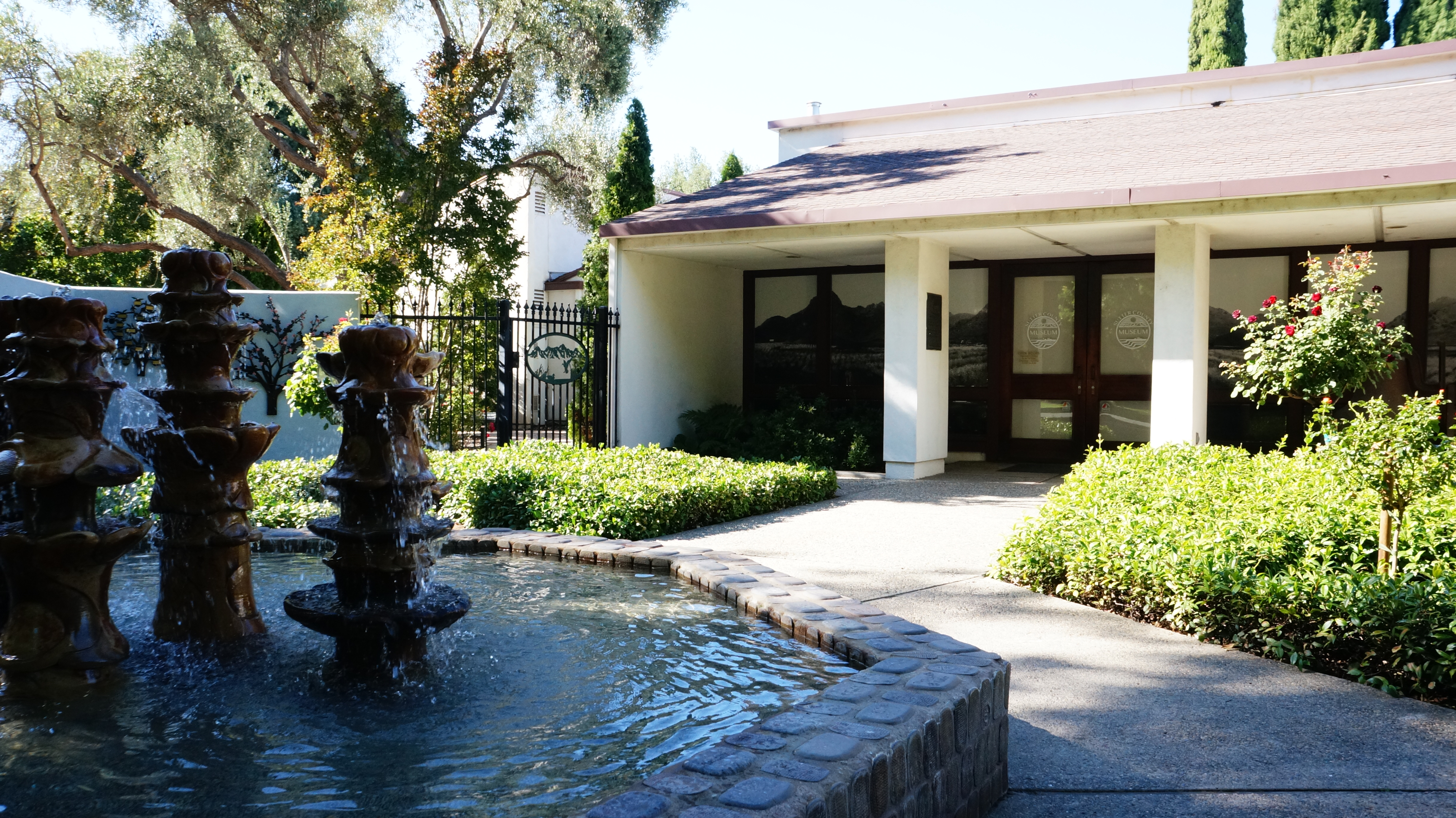
The facade of the Sutter County Museum after their 2019 renovation.

The Sutter County Museum, (formerly the Community Memorial Museum of Sutter County), established in 1975 is the showplace and storehouse for many Yuba-Sutter history treasures and memories. The museum has Nisenan artifacts as well as many from early settlers around the time of the California Gold Rush. The Museum is run as a department of local government by Sutter County, and is located at 1333 Butte House Road, Yuba City, California.

== Portraits From Glass: Faces of Yuba-Sutter Exhibition ==
The exhibition featured the photographic portraits which are printed from glass plate negatives that were stored in the now demolished Odd Fellows’ Building at Third and D Streets in Marysville. Allan Lamb, renowned photographer and framer, spent hundreds of hours to scan and print these photographs from the original glass plate negatives.

== See also ==
- Yuba–Sutter area

39.14655°N 121.63625°W
