= Sutter Union High School District =

School district in California, United States

Address
- 2665 Acacia Avenue Sutter, California, 95982; United States

District information
- Type: Public
- Grades: 9–12
- NCES District ID: 0638610

Students and staff
- Students: 808
- Teachers: 35.5
- Staff: 32.5
- Student–teacher ratio: 22.76

Other information
- Website: www.sutterhuskies.com

The Sutter Union High School District is a school district that operates Brittian Elementary School and Sutter Union High School, both located in the settlement of Sutter, California. The district is separate from the district that governs most schools in the Yuba–Sutter area.
