= California Historical Landmarks in Sutter County =

This list includes properties and districts listed on the California Historical Landmark listing in Sutter County, California. Click the "Map of all coordinates" link to the right to view a Google map of all properties and districts with latitude and longitude coordinates in the table below.

Image		Landmark name	Location	City or town	Summary
Hock Farm	346	Hock Farm	5320 Garden Hwy; 39°02′56″N 121°38′00″W	Yuba City	
Thompson seedless grape propagation site	929	Thompson seedless grape propagation site	9001 Colusa Hwy; 39°08′43″N 121°46′55″W	Yuba City	

== See also ==
- List of California Historical Landmarks
- National Register of Historic Places listings in Sutter County, California
