= Yuba–Sutter area =

- Metropolitan statistical area
- Yuba City Metropolitan Statistical Area
City of Yuba City
City of Marysville
City of Wheatland
Yuba City, CA MSA
Other Counties in the Sacramento–Roseville, CA CSA
- Coordinates: 39°08′05″N 121°37′34″W
- Country: United States
- State(s): California
- Largest city: Yuba City
- Other cities: Marysville; Live Oak; Wheatland

Area
  - Total: 1,252.3 sq mi (3,243 km^{2})
- Highest elevation: 4,825 ft (1,471 m)
- Lowest elevation: 50 ft (15 m)

Population
  - Total: 171,926
  - Rank: 236th in the U.S.
  - Density: 152.4/sq mi (58.8/km^{2})

The Yuba–Sutter area (common name), or Yuba City Metropolitan Statistical Area (name given by the U.S. Census Bureau), is a smaller metropolitan community including Yuba and Sutter Counties in Northern California's Central Valley within the Greater Sacramento area.

The area is anchored by Yuba City, California, the county seat of Sutter County and, to a lesser extent, Marysville, California, the county seat of Yuba County.

== Communities ==
=== Places with more than 50,000 inhabitants ===
Sutter County

- Yuba City (Principal city)

=== Places with 10,000 to 50,000 inhabitantats ===
Yuba County

- Marysville (incorporated city)
- Olivehurst (census-designated place)
- Linda (census-designated place)

=== Places with 1,000 to 10,000 inhabitants ===
Sutter County

- Live Oak (incorporated city)
- South Yuba City (census-designated place)
- Tierra Buena (census-designated place)
- Sutter (census-designated place)

Yuba County

- Beale Air Force Base (census-designated place)
- Challenge-Brownsville (census-designated place)
- Loma Rica (census-designated place)
- Plumas Lake (census-designated place)
- Wheatland (incorporated city)

=== Places with 500 to 1,000 inhabitants ===
Sutter County

- Meridian (census-designated place)
- Rio Oso (census-designated place)

Yuba County

- Dobbins (census-designated place)

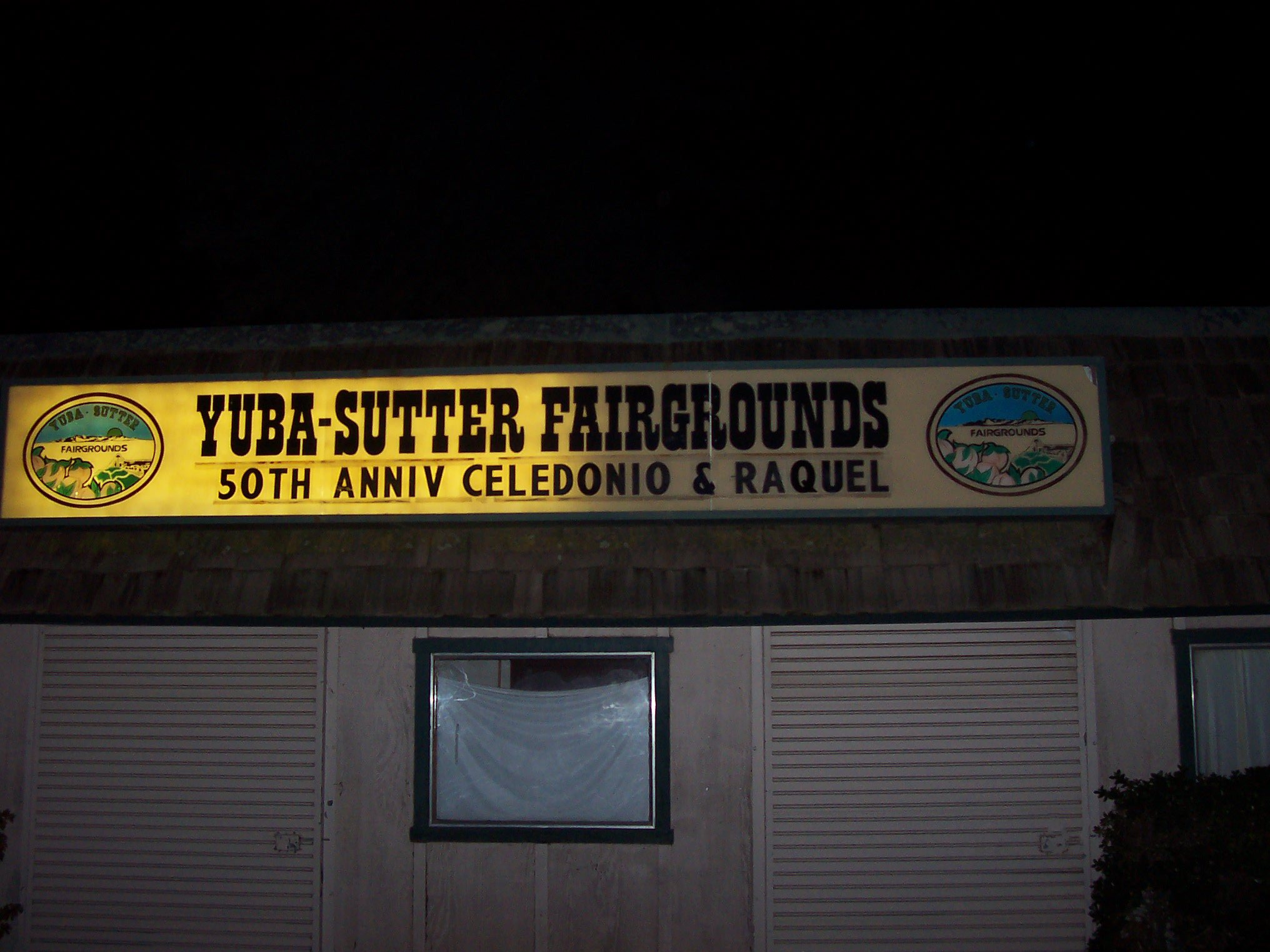
Yuba–Sutter Fairgrounds main entrance.

== Yuba–Sutter Fair ==
Located in the Sacramento Valley, the 13th District Agricultural Association better known as the Yuba–Sutter Fair is long on history and tradition. The first fair was held in Marysville, Yuba County and was actually the California State Fair in August 1858. Agricultural societies were organized and the first state fairs were held on a rotating basis. The first state fair was held in San Francisco in 1854, the second in Sacramento, the third in San Jose, the fourth in Stockton and the fifth in Marysville. Thereafter, the state fair was held annually in Sacramento; however, the district fair continued to be held at the pavilion erected at Cortez Square in Marysville. There were 16 fairs held between the years 1858 and 1879. The district fairs were held until the start of the 20th century and then continuity of fair activities is difficult to trace. Sometime in this era, the idea of holding a county fair replaced the district plan. In the 1920s, noteworthy fairs were held near Browns Valley and the community of Arboga. Originally, the 13th District Agricultural Association comprised Yuba, Sutter, Yolo and Sacramento counties. Decentralization resulted in the exclusion of Sacramento County in 1889 and Yolo County left in 1893.

In the early 1930s, a group of interested citizens established a rodeo arena at the Flying I Ranch in the Arboga District. A half-mile racetrack plus pens and a building for livestock exhibits was constructed. At the same time, other exhibits were displayed in the Yuba county Memorial Auditorium. This was used for the annual fairs and rodeo until 1940. Later it was deemed advisable to obtain a site more centrally located and convenient to the residents of Marysville and Yuba City. Consequently, in July 1941 a 10-acre (4.0 ha) tract of land at our current site was purchased for $1,020. Activities were halted abruptly during the war years. Additional adjacent land was purchased and the fair has been held annually since 1945, although the severe flood of 1955 curtailed operations that year.

Today the 13th District Agricultural Fair is one of fifty-four district agricultural associations. Twenty-four county fairs, two citrus fairs and the state fair make up the 81 State Fair system.

== Concert venues ==
- Toyota Amphitheatre (formerly the Sleep Train Amphiteater)
- Marysville Pavilion
- Hard Rock Live Sacramento at Fire Mountain

== Beale Air Force Base ==
See Beale Air Force Base

== Education ==
=== Colleges and universities ===
- Yuba Community College District
- Chapman University
- Cambridge Career College

=== High schools ===
- Yuba City High School
- Marysville High School
- River Valley High School
- Lindhurst High School
- Sutter Union High School
- Live Oak High School
- Wheatland High School
- Three Rivers High School
- East Nicolaus High School
- Pierce High School
- Marysville Charter Academy for the Arts

== Sights, museums and recreation ==
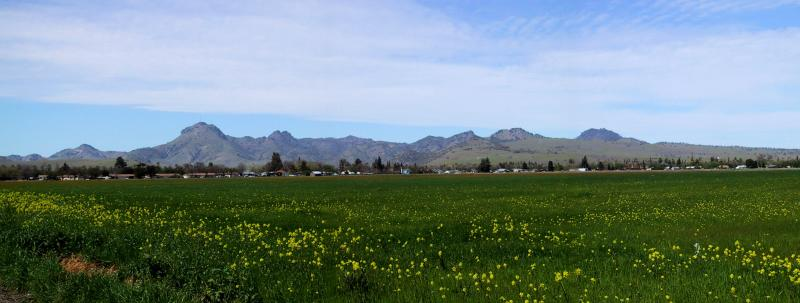
Sutter Buttes

- Sunsweet Growers Incorporated
- Marysville Gold Sox
- Sutter Buttes
- Bryant Field
- Bok Kai Temple - built in 1888 to replace the first temple built in the early 1850s, this temple has been a Chinese community project since 1866
- Sutter Hock Farm
- Marysville High School - Oldest high school in western U.S.
- Ellis Lake
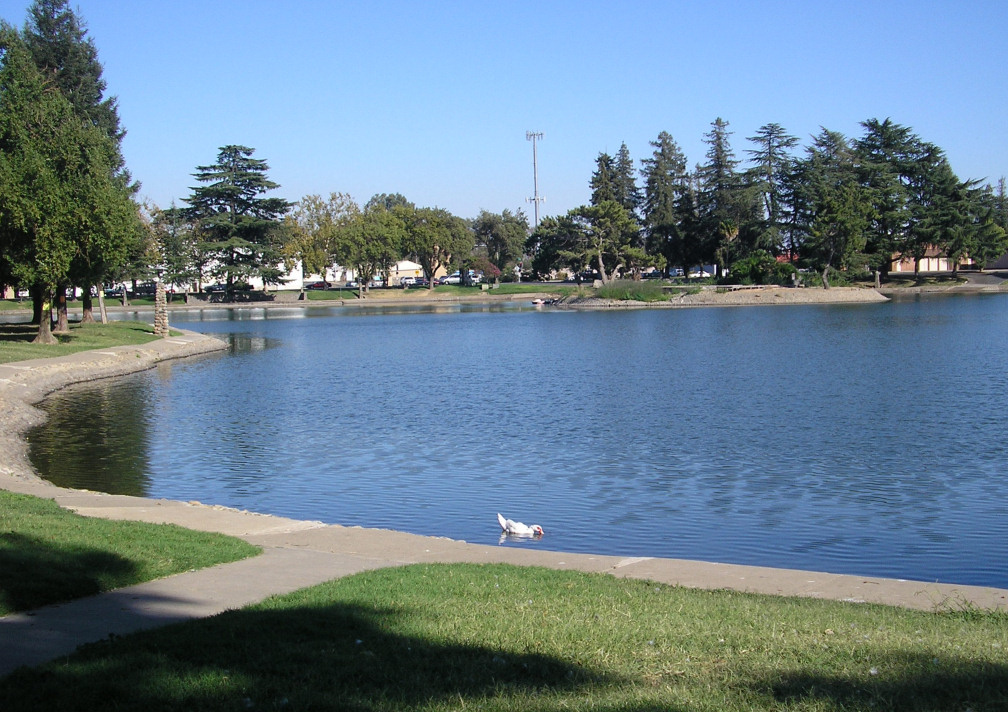
- Community Memorial Museum of Sutter County
- Mary Aaron Memorial Museum
- Museum of the Forgotten Warriors
- Yuba Feather Historical Museum
- Edward F. Beale Museum
- Yuba Sutter Mall
- Riverfront Park

== Media ==
=== Newspaper ===
- The Appeal-Democrat is one of many of the National daily newspapers that were formally owned by Freedom Communications. More specifically, it is the daily local newspaper for Sutter and Yuba county as well as neighboring communities. The Appeal-Democrat has been circulating throughout this region since 1926 when the Marysville Appeal (founded in 1860) and the Marysville Evening Democrat (founded in 1884) merged.
- The Territorial Dispatch was founded by Charlie McNiff in 1984 in Meadow Vista, California. He later moved the newspaper to Marysville and sold it in 2001 to John Mistler. It became a weekly in 2010.
- The Nor-Cal Paper (thenorcalpaper.org) was a weekly full size and full color newspaper from 1997 to 2005 then went strictly to an on-line news and opinions publication. Created by RW Gless, a former Marysville City Councilman from 1992 to 1996, as an Open Forum of news and opinions which allowed people to post views that other medias would not allow or refuse to print.

=== Radio ===
==== FM ====
- KETQ-LP 93.3
- KKCY 103.1
- KXJS 88.7
- KRCX 99.9
- KRYC 105.9

==== AM ====
- KMYC 1410
- KOBO 1450
- KUBA 1600

== Hospitals ==
- Rideout Memorial Hospital - Marysville, California
- Fremont Memorial Hospital - Yuba City, California

== See also ==
- Sacramento Valley
- List of Registered Historic Places in California
