= Robbins, California =

Robbins
- census-designated place
- Position in California
- Coordinates: 38°52′01″N 121°42′26″W
- Country: United States
- State: California
- County: Sutter

Area
  - Total: 2.598 sq mi (6.729 km^{2})
  - Land: 2.589 sq mi (6.706 km^{2})
  - Water: 0.0089 sq mi (0.023 km^{2}) 0.34%
- Elevation: 22 ft (6.7 m)

Population (2020)
  - Total: 347
  - Density: 134/sq mi (51.7/km^{2})
- Time zone: UTC-8 (Pacific (PST))
  - Summer (DST): UTC-7 (PDT)
- ZIP Code: 95676
- Area code: 530
- GNIS feature ID: 2583123

Robbins is a census-designated place (CDP) in Sutter County, California, United States. Robbins sits at an elevation of 23 feet (7.0 m). The ZIP Code is 95676. The community is served by area code 530. The 2020 United States census reported Robbins's population was 347.

== Geography ==
According to the United States Census Bureau, the CDP covers an area of 2.6 square miles (6.7 km^{2}), of which 99.66% is land and 0.34% is water.

== Demographics ==
Historical population
| Census | Pop. | Note | %± |
|---|---|---|---|
| 2010 | 323 | | — |
| 2020 | 347 | | 7.4% |
U.S. Decennial Census; 2010

Robbins first appeared as a census designated place in the 2010 U.S. census.

The 2020 United States census reported that Robbins had a population of 347. The population density was 134.0 inhabitants per square mile (51.7/km^{2}). The racial makeup of Robbins was 131 (37.8%) White, 2 (0.6%) African American, 13 (3.7%) Native American, 1 (0.3%) Asian, 0 (0.0%) Pacific Islander, 146 (42.1%) from other races, and 54 (15.6%) from two or more races. Hispanic or Latino of any race were 224 persons (64.6%).

The whole population lived in households. There were 109 households, out of which 49 (45.0%) had children under the age of 18 living in them, 71 (65.1%) were married-couple households, 9 (8.3%) were cohabiting couple households, 12 (11.0%) had a female householder with no partner present, and 17 (15.6%) had a male householder with no partner present. 14 households (12.8%) were one person, and 5 (4.6%) were one person aged 65 or older. The average household size was 3.18. There were 87 families (79.8% of all households).

The age distribution was 84 people (24.2%) under the age of 18, 30 people (8.6%) aged 18 to 24, 101 people (29.1%) aged 25 to 44, 97 people (28.0%) aged 45 to 64, and 35 people (10.1%) who were 65 years of age or older. The median age was 36.9 years. For every 100 females, there were 109.0 males.

There were 110 housing units at an average density of 42.5 units per square mile (16.4 units/km^{2}), of which 109 (99.1%) were occupied. Of these, 63 (57.8%) were owner-occupied, and 46 (42.2%) were occupied by renters.

== Politics ==
In the state legislature, Robbins is in the 1st senatorial district, represented by Republican Megan Dahle, and in the 3rd Assembly district, represented by Vacant.

Federally, Robbins is in California's 1st congressional district, represented by Republican James Gallagher.
