= Meridian, Sutter County, California =

Meridian
- Census-designated place
- Position in California.
- Coordinates: 39°08′26″N 121°54′28″W
- Country: United States
- State: California
- County: Sutter

Area
  - Total: 5.295 sq mi (13.714 km^{2})
  - Land: 5.295 sq mi (13.714 km^{2})
  - Water: 0 sq mi (0 km^{2}) 0%
- Elevation: 43 ft (13 m)

Population (2020)
  - Total: 304
  - Density: 57.4/sq mi (22.2/km^{2})
- Time zone: UTC-8 (Pacific (PST))
  - Summer (DST): UTC-7 (PDT)
- ZIP Code: 95957
- Area code: 530
- GNIS feature ID: 2583078

Meridian is a census-designated place (CDP) in Sutter County, California, United States. Meridian sits at an elevation of 43 feet (13 m). It is in the Yuba City Metropolitan Statistical Area. The ZIP Code is 95957. The community is inside area code 530. The 2020 United States census reported Meridian's population was 304.

== Geography ==
According to the United States Census Bureau, the CDP covers an area of 5.3 square miles (13.7 km^{2}), all land.

== Demographics ==
Historical population
Census	Pop.	Note	%±
2010	358		—
2020	304		−15.1%
U.S. Decennial Census; 2010

Meridian first appeared as a census designated place in the 2010 U.S. census.

The 2020 United States census reported that Meridian had a population of 304. The population density was 57.4 inhabitants per square mile (22.2/km^{2}). The racial makeup of Meridian was 221 (72.7%) White, 0 (0.0%) African American, 10 (3.3%) Native American, 0 (0.0%) Asian, 0 (0.0%) Pacific Islander, 44 (14.5%) from other races, and 29 (9.5%) from two or more races. Hispanic or Latino of any race were 64 persons (21.1%).

The whole population lived in households. There were 128 households, out of which 37 (28.9%) had children under the age of 18 living in them, 70 (54.7%) were married-couple households, 5 (3.9%) were cohabiting couple households, 28 (21.9%) had a female householder with no partner present, and 25 (19.5%) had a male householder with no partner present. 37 households (28.9%) were one person, and 20 (15.6%) were one person aged 65 or older. The average household size was 2.38. There were 85 families (66.4% of all households).

The age distribution was 62 people (20.4%) under the age of 18, 22 people (7.2%) aged 18 to 24, 55 people (18.1%) aged 25 to 44, 102 people (33.6%) aged 45 to 64, and 63 people (20.7%) who were 65 years of age or older. The median age was 47.6 years. For every 100 females, there were 87.7 males.

There were 144 housing units at an average density of 27.2 units per square mile (10.5 units/km^{2}), of which 128 (88.9%) were occupied. Of these, 84 (65.6%) were owner-occupied, and 44 (34.4%) were occupied by renters.

== Politics ==
In the state legislature, Meridian is in the 4th Senate District, represented by Republican Jim Nielsen, and in the 2nd Assembly District, represented by Democrat Jim Wood.

Federally, Meridian is in California's 3rd congressional district, represented by Independent Kevin Kiley.
