= Sutter National Wildlife Refuge =

National Wildlife Refuge in California

- IUCN category IV (habitat/species management area)
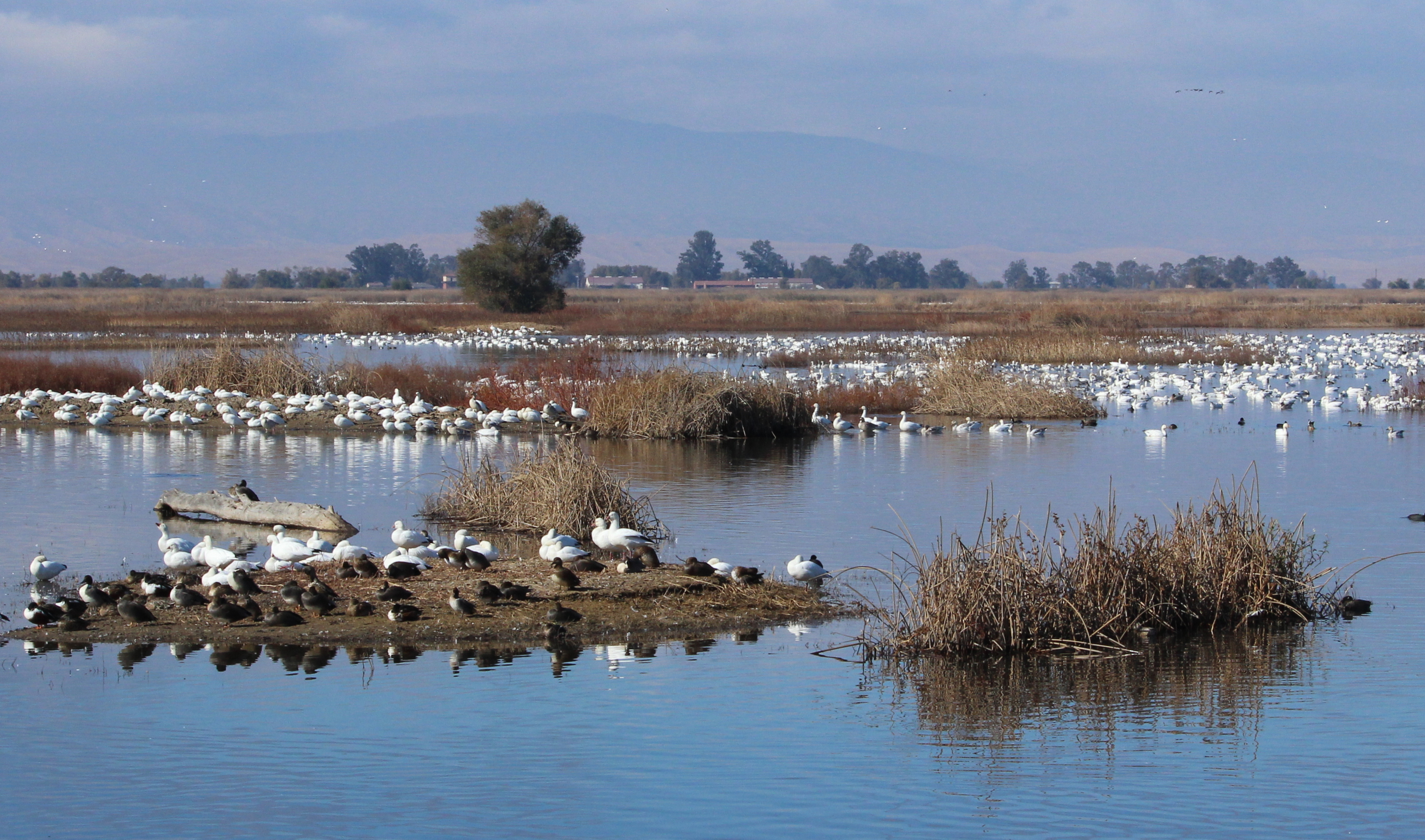

- Location within the United States
- Location: Sutter County, California, United States
- Nearest city: Yuba City, California
- Coordinates: 39°04′59″N 121°45′22″W
- Area: 2,591 acres (10.49 km^{2})
- Established: 1945
- Governing body: U.S. Fish and Wildlife Service
- Website: Sutter National Wildlife Refuge

Sutter National Wildlife Refuge, the southernmost refuge in the Sacramento National Wildlife Refuge Complex, is located in the Sacramento Valley of California, about 50 miles (80 km) north of the metropolitan area of Sacramento. The refuge consists of about 2,600 acres (11 km^{2}), consisting primarily of wetland impoundments with some riparian and grassland habitat.

About 80 percent of the refuge is located in the Sutter Bypass, a floodwater bypass from the Sacramento River that floods at least once a year and may cover portions of the refuge with up to 12 feet (3.7 m) of water. Sutter Refuge typically supports wintering populations of more than 175,000 ducks and 50,000 geese.

The mixed riparian forest habitat on the refuge is important for breeding and migrating passerine birds, and supports a large heron/egret rookery. The refuge provides habitat for several Federal and State endangered and threatened species, including giant garter snake, winter-run Chinook salmon, yellow-billed cuckoo, and Swainson's hawk.
