= Willie Clark (American football) =

American football player (born 1972)

No. 31, 25
- Position: Cornerback

Personal information
- Born: January 6, 1972 (age 54); New Haven, Connecticut, U.S.
- Listed height: 5 ft 10 in (1.78 m)
- Listed weight: 186 lb (84 kg)

Career information
- High school: Wheatland (Wheatland, California)
- College: Notre Dame
- NFL draft: 1994: 3rd round, 82nd overall pick

Career history
- San Diego Chargers (1994–1996); Baltimore Ravens (1997)*; Philadelphia Eagles (1997); St. Louis Rams (1998)*; San Diego Chargers (1998)
- * Offseason or practice squad member only

Career NFL statistics
- Tackles: 96
- Interceptions: 4
- Stats at Pro Football Reference

Willie Calvin Clark, Jr. (born January 6, 1972) is an American former professional football player who was a cornerback for the San Diego Chargers (1994–1996, 1998) and the Philadelphia Eagles (1997) in the National Football League (NFL). He played college football for the Notre Dame Fighting Irish and was selected by the Chargers in the third round of the 1994 NFL draft. He currently is the Executive Director of Secondary Education for the Manatee County School District in Manatee County, Florida.
