= Yuba Sutter Marketplace =

- Location: Yuba City, California, United States
- Coordinates: 39.14374°N 121.63264°W
- Address: Colusa Avenue and Highway 99
- Opened: March 7, 1990
- Developer: Stanley W. Gribble and Associates
- Owner: Ethan Conrad Properties
- Num. of stores: 50
- Num. of anchor tenants: 5
- Floor area: 407,857 square feet (37,891.2 m^{2})
- Floors: 1
- Website: www.shopyubasuttermarketplace.com

Yuba Sutter Marketplace (formerly Yuba Sutter Mall and The Mall at Yuba City) is a single-level shopping mall located in Yuba City, California, United States, opened on March 7, 1990. It is the only enclosed shopping mall in the Yuba–Sutter area. The mall is anchored by Burlington, Hobby Lobby, JCPenney, Planet Fitness and Ross Dress for Less.

== History ==
Yuba Sutter Marketplace opened originally as The Mall at Yuba City on March 7, 1990, with Gottschalks, JCPenney and Sears serving as the original anchors. The mall replaces the Peach Tree Mall in neighboring Linda, California in Yuba County, after that mall suffered damage from the February 20, 1986 flood. The former mall was later known as the Feather River Center and formerly housed county offices. The old mall suffered extensive fire damage on October 3, 2021 and was later demolished in January 2022. A Costco opened on November 22, 2023 on the site of the old mall.

The mall was renamed Yuba Sutter Mall on June 24, 2005, after a mild renovation. In March 2009, the Gottschalks store closed after the chain went into bankruptcy. Clothing retailer Forever 21 opened in the former Gottschalks in August 2009, but was later shuttered in April 2016. In 2017, Planet Fitness and grocery retailer Smart & Final opened in the former Gottschalks/Forever 21, with both businesses occupying portions of the building. Smart & Final was later shuttered in 2019.

On May 6, 2020, the mall was renamed to its current moniker as part of its reopening from the COVID-19 lockdown that shuttered the mall in March 2020.

On June 19, 2020, it was announced that Sears would be closing as part of a plan to close 28 stores nationwide. Sears closed on September 6, 2020. The closure left JCPenney as the last remaining original anchor, with Planet Fitness and Ross Dress for Less as the other remaining anchors.

In 2022, the mall gained two new anchors. Arts & crafts retailer Hobby Lobby opened May 9 in the former Sears and Burlington opened July 15 in the former Smart & Final. Discount retailer Five Below also opened in one of the remaining spaces in the building currently occupied by Planet Fitness and Burlington.
