= Trowbridge, California =

Trowbridge
- census-designated place
- Position in California.
- Coordinates: 38°55′35″N 121°30′53″W
- Country: United States
- State: California
- County: Sutter

Area
  - Total: 6.780 sq mi (17.560 km^{2})
  - Land: 6.780 sq mi (17.560 km^{2})
  - Water: 0 sq mi (0 km^{2}) 0%
- Elevation: 52 ft (16 m)

Population (2020)
  - Total: 229
  - Density: 33.8/sq mi (13.0/km^{2})
- Time zone: UTC-8 (Pacific (PST))
  - Summer (DST): UTC-7 (PDT)
- GNIS feature ID: 2583169

Trowbridge is a census-designated place (CDP) in Sutter County, California, United States. Trowbridge sits at an elevation of 52 feet (16 m). The 2020 United States census reported Trowbridge's population was 229.

== Geography ==
According to the United States Census Bureau, the CDP covers an area of 6.8 square miles (17.6 km^{2}), all land.

=== Climate ===
According to the Köppen Climate Classification system, Trowbridge has a warm-summer Mediterranean climate, abbreviated "Csa" on climate maps.

== Demographics ==
Historical population
Census	Pop.	Note	%±
2010	226		—
2020	229		1.3%
U.S. Decennial Census; 2010

The 2020 United States census reported that Trowbridge had a population of 229. The population density was 33.8 inhabitants per square mile (13.1/km^{2}). The racial makeup of Trowbridge was 175 (76.4%) White, 3 (1.3%) African American, 0 (0.0%) Native American, 3 (1.3%) Asian, 0 (0.0%) Pacific Islander, 13 (5.7%) from other races, and 35 (15.3%) from two or more races. Hispanic or Latino of any race were 34 persons (14.8%).

The whole population lived in households. There were 80 households, out of which 18 (22.5%) had children under the age of 18 living in them, 42 (52.5%) were married-couple households, 7 (8.8%) were cohabiting couple households, 27 (33.8%) had a female householder with no partner present, and 4 (5.0%) had a male householder with no partner present. 22 households (27.5%) were one person, and 13 (16.2%) were one person aged 65 or older. The average household size was 2.86. There were 54 families (67.5% of all households).

The age distribution was 46 people (20.1%) under the age of 18, 13 people (5.7%) aged 18 to 24, 68 people (29.7%) aged 25 to 44, 54 people (23.6%) aged 45 to 64, and 48 people (21.0%) who were 65 years of age or older. The median age was 39.2 years. There were 131 males and 98 females.

There were 84 housing units at an average density of 12.4 units per square mile (4.8 units/km^{2}), of which 80 (95.2%) were occupied. Of these, 44 (55.0%) were owner-occupied, and 36 (45.0%) were occupied by renters.
