= Marysville High School (California) =

Location
- 12 East 18th Street Marysville, California 95901, USA
- Coordinates: 39.15602°N 121.58708°W

Information
- Type: Public
- Established: 1871
- School district: Marysville Joint School District
- Principal: Joe Seiler
- Teaching staff: 52.07 (FTE)
- Grades: 9-12
- Enrollment: 1,034 (2024-2025)
- Student to teacher ratio: 19.86
- Color
- Mascot: Indian
- Website: http://marysville.mjusd.com

Marysville High School is a public school located in Marysville, California, USA within the Yuba City Metropolitan Statistical Area. The school mascot is the Indians and the school colors are orange and black. As of June 2024, it has had 151 graduating classes.
