= Glenn Hubbard (baseball) =

American baseball player (born 1957)

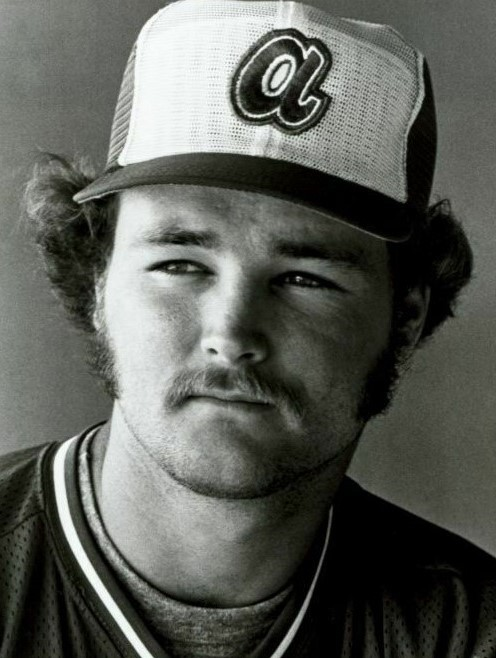
- Second baseman
- Born: September 25, 1957 (age 68); Hahn AFB, West Germany
- Batted: Right Threw: Right

MLB debut
- July 14, 1978, for the Atlanta Braves

Last MLB appearance
- July 29, 1989, for the Oakland Athletics

MLB statistics
- Batting average: .244
- Home runs: 70
- Runs batted in: 448
- Stats at Baseball Reference

Teams
- As player: Atlanta Braves (1978–1987); Oakland Athletics (1988–1989); As coach: Atlanta Braves (1999–2010)

Career highlights and awards
- All-Star (1983)

Glenn Dee Hubbard (born September 25, 1957) is an American professional baseball player and coach. He played in Major League Baseball (MLB) as a second baseman for the Atlanta Braves and Oakland Athletics from 1978 to 1989. He was an MLB All-Star in 1983. Hubbard coached for the Braves from 1999 to 2010.

== Playing career ==
Hubbard attended Wheatland High School, just outside Beale AFB, California, where his father was stationed. He finished high school at Ben Lomond High School when his father moved to Hill Air Force Base near Ogden, Utah. Out of high school, he was a 20th round selection in the 1975 MLB draft. The Atlanta Braves promoted him to the major leagues in 1978. Hubbard hit his first major league home run on September 23, 1978.

In 1983, Hubbard had his best season; he hit .263 with 14 home runs and 70 runs batted in (RBIs), as he earned his only All-Star Game appearance. During his 7th inning at-bat, announcers Vin Scully and Joe Garagiola made numerous light-hearted comments—even calling him Old Mother Hubbard—about his full beard, as beards were not in fashion at the time. Hubbard got a single when he hit a hard grounder to another first-time All-Star, Cal Ripken, which took a hop that Ripken couldn't handle.

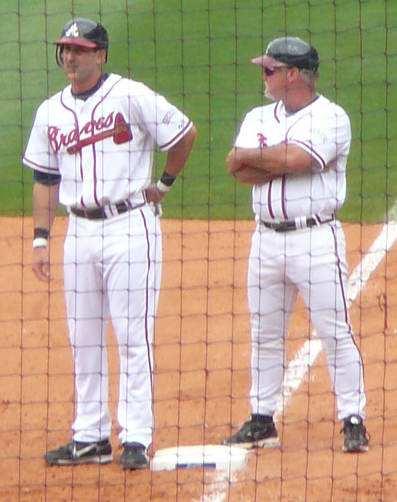
Hubbard (right) with Greg Norton in 2008

Hubbard was known for his defense, and he holds the record for highest range factor per nine innings for a second baseman in MLB history. He also had the most double plays in the National League for two seasons, and from 1981 to 1987, he consistently finished in the top two for assists in the league. In 1982, he led the league and second basemen overall in both double plays and sacrifice hits.

Hubbard's willingness to stand in while turning a double play with a runner coming at him and his steady glove made him very valuable for the Braves. He holds Braves' team fielding records for second basemen in all categories.

Hubbard's most notable trading card is his 1984 Fleer card, in which he has an eight-foot boa constrictor draped around his neck. The snake was part of a pre-game birthday ceremony for the Philadelphia Phillies' mascot, the Phillie Phanatic. Hubbard had spontaneously recruited a photographer at the park to take a shot of him with the snake and did not know it would be widely seen. He was subsequently surprised by its inclusion on the card and took many years to become comfortable with the image.

Hubbard's career with the Braves lasted from 1978 to 1987. He signed as a free agent with the Oakland Athletics and played with them in 1988 and 1989.

In 1,354 games over 12 seasons, Hubbard posted a .244 batting average (1084-for-4441) with 545 runs, 214 doubles, 22 triples, 70 home runs, 448 RBIs, 35 stolen bases, and 539 bases on balls. He recorded a .983 fielding percentage; on defense, he appeared only at second base. In seven postseason games, he hit .238 (5-for-21) with three runs, one RBI and one walk.

== Coaching career ==
In 1999, Hubbard was hired as the Braves' first base coach, under manager Bobby Cox. When Fredi Gonzalez was hired as the Braves' manager on October 13, 2010, Hubbard was not offered a position on his staff, and the previous hitting coach, Terry Pendleton, replaced him.

The Kansas City Royals organization hired Hubbard in 2011, and in 2014, he was hired as first base coach for the Lexington Legends, who operate as the Royals' class A team. On June 24, 2016, the Legends held a promotional giveaway with a Glenn Hubbard bobblehead, featuring him in a Legends uniform with a boa constrictor draped across his neck, as on his Fleer card.

Sporting positions
Preceded by Pat Corrales	Atlanta Braves first base coach 1999–2010	Succeeded by Terry Pendleton
