= South Yuba City, California =

Unincorporated community in California, United States

- Census-designated place (CDP) & Unincorporated community
- Location in Sutter County and the state of California
- Coordinates: 39°6′44″N 121°38′20″W
- Country: United States
- State: California
- County: Sutter

Area
  - Total: 3.2 sq mi (8.4 km^{2})
  - Land: 3.2 sq mi (8.4 km^{2})
  - Water: 0 sq mi (0 km^{2})
- Elevation: 52 ft (16 m)

Population (2000)
  - Total: 12,651
  - Density: 3,901/sq mi (1,506.1/km^{2})
- Time zone: UTC-8 (Pacific (PST))
  - Summer (DST): UTC-7 (PDT)
- ZIP code: 95991
- Area code: 530
- FIPS code: 06-73472
- GNIS feature ID: 1867060

South Yuba City is an unincorporated community and former census-designated place (CDP) in Sutter County, California, United States. It is part of the Yuba City Metropolitan Statistical Area within the Greater Sacramento CSA. The population was 12,651 at the 2000 census.

== Geography ==
South Yuba City is located at 39°6′44″N 121°38′20″W (39.112192, -121.638976).

According to the United States Census Bureau, the CDP has a total area of 3.2 square miles (8.3 km^{2}), all land.

== Demographics ==
As of the census of 2000, there were 12,651 people, 4,026 households, and 3,345 families residing in the CDP. The population density was 3,908.7 inhabitants per square mile (1,509.2/km^{2}). There were 4,144 housing units at an average density of 1,280.3 per square mile (494.3/km^{2}). The racial makeup of the CDP was 63.95% White, 1.68% African American, 0.91% Native American, 22.95% Asian, 0.23% Pacific Islander, 6.15% from other races, and 4.13% from two or more races. Hispanic or Latino of any race were 11.86% of the population.

There were 4,026 households, out of which 42.1% had children under the age of 18 living with them, 70.6% were married couples living together, 8.4% had a female householder with no husband present, and 16.9% were non-families. 13.3% of all households were made up of individuals, and 5.0% had someone living alone who was 65 years of age or older. The average household size was 3.13 and the average family size was 3.45.

In the CDP, the population was spread out, with 29.7% under the age of 18, 7.1% from 18 to 24, 28.7% from 25 to 44, 23.8% from 45 to 64, and 10.8% who were 65 years of age or older. The median age was 35 years. For every 100 females, there were 96.9 males. For every 100 females age 18 and over, there were 93.5 males.

The median income for a household in the CDP was $54,518, and the median income for a family was $59,886. Males had a median income of $40,574 versus $31,265 for females. The per capita income for the CDP was $21,423. About 4.9% of families and 5.8% of the population were below the poverty line, including 7.5% of those under age 18 and 6.4% of those age 65 or over.

== Media ==
MySYtv.com provides television coverage of local events in the area.

== Politics ==
In the state legislature, South Yuba City is in the 4th Senate District, represented by Republican Doug LaMalfa, and in the 2nd Assembly District, represented by Republican Jim Nielsen.

Federally, South Yuba City is in California's 3rd congressional district, represented by Independent Kevin Kiley.
