= KMYC =

- Marysville, California; United States
- Broadcast area: Yuba–Sutter area
- Frequency: 1410 kHz
- Branding: The Patriot 104.3

Programming
- Format: News/talk

Ownership
- Owner: E. E. Friesen

History
- First air date: 1940

Technical information
- Licensing authority: FCC
- Facility ID: 40633
- Class: B
- Power: 5,000 watts (day); 1,000 watts (night)
- Transmitter coordinates: 39°08′17.6″N 121°33′18.9″W
- Translator: 104.3 K282BS (Marysville)

Links
- Public license information: Public file; LMS
- Webcast: Listen Live
- Website: kmyc1410am.com

KMYC (1410 AM, "The Patriot 104.3") is a news/talk radio station licensed to Marysville, California. KMYC covers the Yuba–Sutter area. It was originally on 1420 kHz and moved to 1450 kHz in 1941 due to the NARBA agreement, it moved to 1410 kHz in 1952.

In April 2020, KMYC was for sale following the death of station owner Tom Huth. The sale of KMYC and translator K282BS to E. E. Friesen was consummated on February 9, 2021, at a price of $50,000.
