= Wheatland High School (California) =

Location
- 1010 Wheatland Rd; Wheatland, California 95692
- Coordinates: 39.00634°N 121.43088°W

Information
- Type: Public
- Established: 1907
- Staff: 50.19 (FTE)
- Enrollment: 1,048 (2022–2023)
- Student to teacher ratio: 20.88
- Color
- Mascot: Pirate
- Rivals: Sutter Union High School
- Website: www.wheatlandhigh.org

Wheatland Union High School is located in Wheatland, California, USA. The high school serves the city of Wheatland as well as Beale AFB and Plumas Lake. The area is included within the Yuba City Metropolitan Statistical Area.

Growth did not really hit the area until the late 1950s and until then the student body of the Wheatland High School was not in excess of 100 students. The full impact of the growth was foreseen about 1957 and the planning of the present plant followed. An election was held for voting the bonds in 1959 to construct the school plant. The completion of the new High School was September 1961 with the gymnasium completed in December 1961 and full occupancy January 1962. The contract was let October 28, 1960. The architect of Wheatland High School is Leonard Dam Blackford, a former student of the school.

The $4 million high school plan includes girls and boys locker rooms, outdoor community circle for entertainment called The Commons, a football field, a baseball field, track facilities, shops, and forty-one classrooms.

Today, plans to add portables and other buildings are underway to expand the campus to accommodate the increase in population. The current student body of around 1000 is expected to grow by some 200-300 students by 2023.

== Notable alumni ==
- Willie Clark (American football)
- Glenn Hubbard (baseball)
