= East Nicolaus, California =

East Nicolaus
- census-designated place
- Location of East Nicolaus in Sutter County, California.

- Position in California.
- Coordinates: 38°54′36″N 121°32′40″W
- Country: United States
- State: California
- County: Sutter

Area
  - Total: 4.58 sq mi (11.87 km^{2})
  - Land: 4.58 sq mi (11.87 km^{2})
  - Water: 0 sq mi (0.00 km^{2}) 0%
- Elevation: 43 ft (13 m)

Population (2020)
  - Total: 223
  - Density: 48.7/sq mi (18.79/km^{2})
- Time zone: UTC-8 (Pacific (PST))
  - Summer (DST): UTC-7 (PDT)
- GNIS feature ID: 2583004

East Nicolaus is a census-designated place (CDP) in Sutter County, California, United States. East Nicolaus sits at an elevation of 43 feet (13 m). The 2020 United States census reported East Nicolaus's population was 223. It is home to East Nicolaus High School (ENHS), a public school that serves grades nine through twelve.

== Geography ==
According to the United States Census Bureau, the CDP covers an area of 4.6 square miles (11.9 km^{2}), all land.

== Demographics ==
Historical population
Census	Pop.	Note	%±
2010	225		—
2020	223		−0.9%
U.S. Decennial Census

The 2020 United States census reported that East Nicolaus had a population of 223. The population density was 48.7 inhabitants per square mile (18.8/km^{2}). The racial makeup of East Nicolaus was 139 (62.3%) White, 0 (0.0%) African American, 8 (3.6%) Native American, 7 (3.1%) Asian, 2 (0.9%) Pacific Islander, 27 (12.1%) from other races, and 40 (17.9%) from two or more races. Hispanic or Latino of any race were 53 persons (23.8%).

The whole population lived in households. There were 85 households, out of which 21 (24.7%) had children under the age of 18 living in them, 40 (47.1%) were married-couple households, 4 (4.7%) were cohabiting couple households, 20 (23.5%) had a female householder with no partner present, and 21 (24.7%) had a male householder with no partner present. 25 households (29.4%) were one person, and 18 (21.2%) were one person aged 65 or older. The average household size was 2.62. There were 56 families (65.9% of all households).

The age distribution was 33 people (14.8%) under the age of 18, 17 people (7.6%) aged 18 to 24, 50 people (22.4%) aged 25 to 44, 61 people (27.4%) aged 45 to 64, and 62 people (27.8%) who were 65 years of age or older. The median age was 48.3 years. For every 100 females, there were 93.9 males.

There were 98 housing units at an average density of 21.4 units per square mile (8.3 units/km^{2}), of which 85 (86.7%) were occupied. Of these, 64 (75.3%) were owner-occupied, and 21 (24.7%) were occupied by renters.

== Notable person ==
- James Gallagher, U.S. Representative for California's 1st congressional district and former Minority Leader of the California State Assembly
