= Rio Oso, California =

Rio Oso
- Census-designated place
- Position in California. Rio Oso (the United States)
- Coordinates: 38°57′06″N 121°31′52″W
- Country: United States
- State: California
- County: Sutter

Area
  - Total: 6.500 sq mi (16.834 km^{2})
  - Land: 6.500 sq mi (16.834 km^{2})
  - Water: 0 sq mi (0 km^{2}) 0%
- Elevation: 52 ft (16 m)

Population (2020)
  - Total: 372
  - Density: 57.2/sq mi (22.1/km^{2})
- Time zone: UTC-8 (Pacific (PST))
  - Summer (DST): UTC-7 (PDT)
- ZIP Code: 95674
- Area code: 530
- GNIS feature ID: 2583121

Rio Oso (Spanish: Río Oso, meaning "Bear River") is a census-designated place (CDP) in Sutter County, California, United States. Rio Oso sits at an elevation of 52 feet (16 m). The ZIP Code is 95674. The community is served by area code 530. The 2020 United States census reported Rio Oso's population was 372.

== Geography ==
According to the United States Census Bureau, the CDP covers an area of 6.5 square miles (16.8 km^{2}), all land.

== Demographics ==
Historical population
Census	Pop.	Note	%±
2010	356		—
2020	372		4.5%
U.S. Decennial Census; 2010

Rio Oso first appeared as a census designated place in the 2010 U.S. census.

The 2020 United States census reported that Rio Oso had a population of 372. The population density was 57.2 inhabitants per square mile (22.1/km^{2}). The racial makeup of Rio Oso was 274 (73.7%) White, 8 (2.2%) African American, 4 (1.1%) Native American, 8 (2.2%) Asian, 0 (0.0%) Pacific Islander, 36 (9.7%) from other races, and 42 (11.3%) from two or more races. Hispanic or Latino of any race were 61 persons (16.4%).

The whole population lived in households. There were 127 households, out of which 42 (33.1%) had children under the age of 18 living in them, 88 (69.3%) were married-couple households, 5 (3.9%) were cohabiting couple households, 13 (10.2%) had a female householder with no partner present, and 21 (16.5%) had a male householder with no partner present. 19 households (15.0%) were one person, and 10 (7.9%) were one person aged 65 or older. The average household size was 2.93. There were 104 families (81.9% of all households).

The age distribution was 96 people (25.8%) under the age of 18, 40 people (10.8%) aged 18 to 24, 66 people (17.7%) aged 25 to 44, 110 people (29.6%) aged 45 to 64, and 60 people (16.1%) who were 65 years of age or older. The median age was 40.4 years. For every 100 females, there were 104.4 males.

There were 144 housing units at an average density of 22.2 units per square mile (8.6 units/km^{2}), of which 127 (88.2%) were occupied. Of these, 100 (78.7%) were owner-occupied, and 27 (21.3%) were occupied by renters.

== Politics ==
In the state legislature, Rio Oso is in the 1st senatorial district, represented by Republican Megan Dahle, and in the 3rd Assembly district, represented by Vacant.

Federally, Rio Oso is in California's 1st congressional district, represented by Republican James Gallagher.

== Notable person ==
- Wally Herger, former member of the United States House of Representatives.
