= Sutter Basin =

- Location within California

Geography
- Country: United States
- State: California
- Region: Lower Feather Watershed
- Coordinates: 38.8854°N 121.615°W
- Interactive map of Sutter Basin

The Sutter Basin is a 264 sq mi (680 km^{2}) area of the Sacramento Valley in the U.S. state of California, and is part of the Feather River drainage basin. The basin includes the Sutter Basin Fire Protection District of ~127 sq mi (330 km^{2}) and uses irrigation from the Thermalito Afterbay's Sutter-Butte Canal. The Feather River and the Sutter By-Pass are the basin's east and southwest borders.

== Sutter Bypass ==
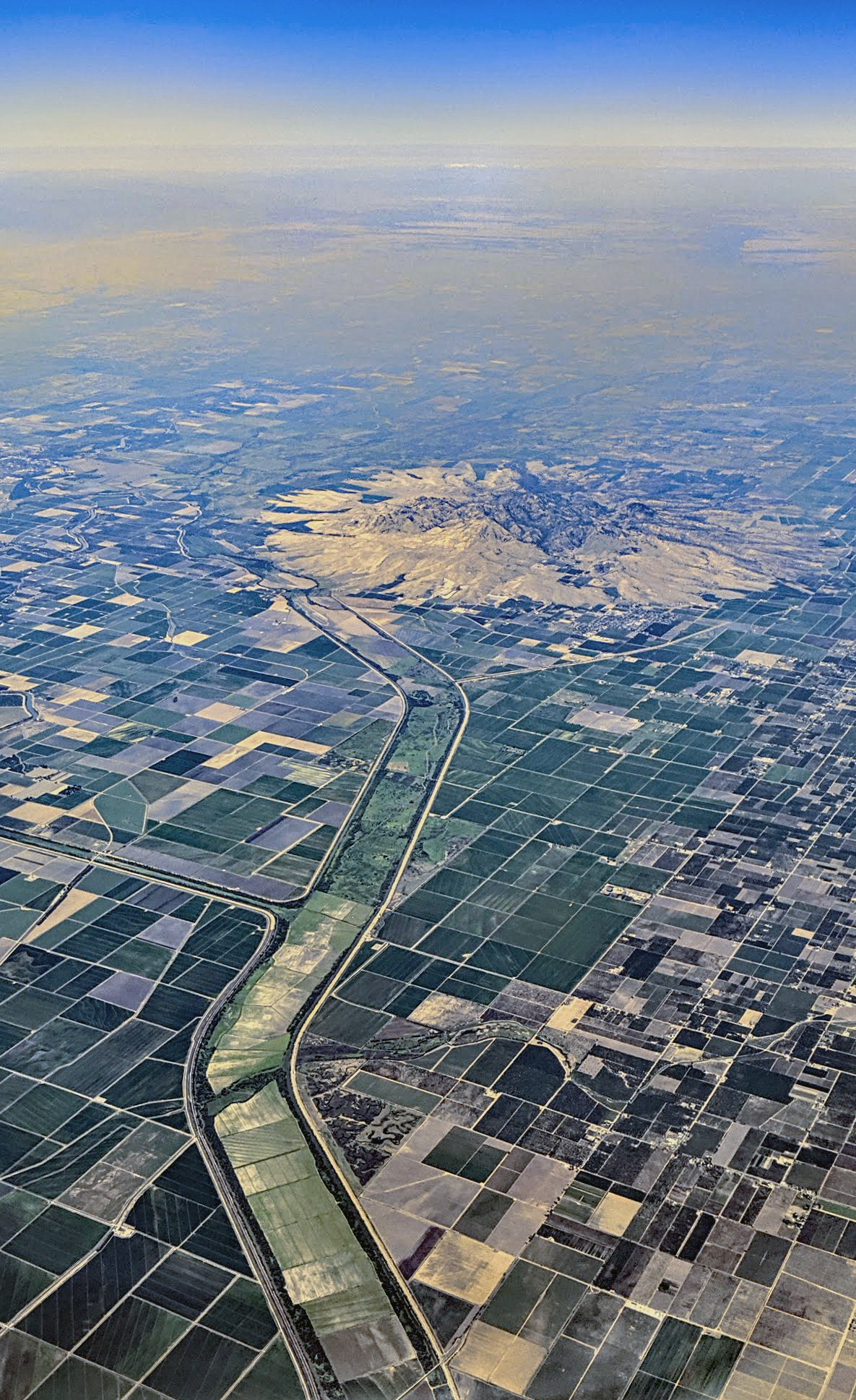
Sutter Bypass aerial view from the south

The Sutter Bypass is a leveed channel of the Lower Sacramento Valley Flood-Control System along the southwest portion of the Sutter Basin. The bypass allows channeling of escapement flow from the Tisdale Weir near the Sutter Buttes to the Feather River at 38.885421°N 121.614532°W. During Sacramento River flows of >23,000 cu ft/s (650 m^{3}/s), Sacramento overflow tops the 53 ft (16 m) Tisdale Weir and flows via the Sutter Bypass to Feather River mile 7 (the west levee of the bypass continues along the Feather River to the Sacramento River).

The bypass also receives similar Sacramento escapement flow from the Colusa Weir, and the Snake River, Gilsizer Slough, Wadsworth Canal, and other west side watercourses of the Lower Feather Watershed also drain to the Feather River via the Sutter Bypass, The bypass includes 3.24 sq mi (8.4 km^{2}) of the Sutter National Wildlife Refuge, which is part of California's ~5.00 sq mi (12.9 km^{2}) Sutter Bypass Wildlife Area.

== See also ==
- Feather Headwaters
- Yolo Bypass
