= Wally Herger =

American politician (born 1945)

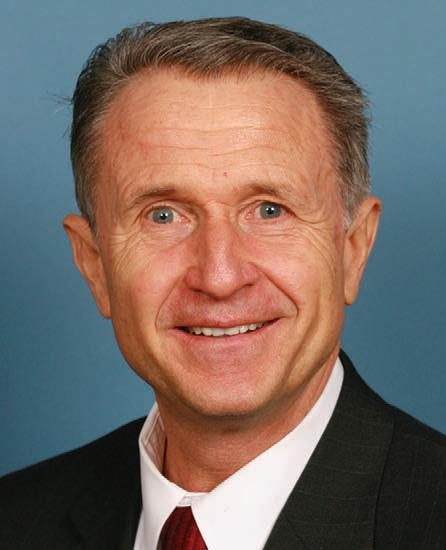

Member of the U.S. House of Representatives from California's 2nd district
- In office January 3, 1987 – January 3, 2013
- Preceded by: Eugene A. Chappie
- Succeeded by: Jared Huffman

Member of the California State Assembly from the 3rd district
- In office December 1, 1980 – November 30, 1986
- Preceded by: Eugene A. Chappie
- Succeeded by: Christopher Chandler

Personal details
- Born: Walter William Herger Jr. May 20, 1945 (age 81) Yuba City, California, U.S.
- Party: Republican
- Spouse: Deborah Burke (divorced) Pamela Sargent (m. 1975)
- Children: 9
- Education: American River College; California State University, Sacramento
- Herger's voice Herger supporting the PRIDE Act of 2003. Recorded February 13, 2003

Walter William Herger Jr. (born May 20, 1945) is an American politician who served as the U.S. representative for California's 2nd congressional district from 1987 to 2013. A member of the Republican Party, his district was the state's largest congressional district by area. It covered almost all of interior Northern California including Chico, Redding and Red Bluff. On January 10, 2012, Herger announced he would not seek re-election in November.

== Early life, education, and early political career ==
Herger was born in Yuba City, California. He is of Swiss descent; his paternal grandfather emigrated to the US from the canton of Uri in the late 19th century. He is also of German and Irish descent. Herger was raised on his family's 200-acre (0.81 km^{2}) cattle ranch and plum farm in the northern California town of Rio Oso (between Yuba City and Sacramento). He worked in the family's oil and gas exploration business.

He joined the Church of Jesus Christ of Latter-day Saints when he was about 20 years old. He graduated from American River College with an Associate of Arts. He also attended California State University, Sacramento for a year. His political career started in 1976, with his election to the East Nicolaus School Board. He also served northern California in the California State Assembly from 1980 to 1986.

== U.S. House of Representatives ==
=== Elections ===
Herger was easily reelected to Congress due to the "safe" Republican voter registration advantage in this district, but his election campaigns were challenged by Democratic candidates in his last campaigns. The district often fields a candidate registered with a third party, such as the Libertarian party and, during the 1990s, the Natural Law Party.

In 2002 and 2004, Herger defeated Democrat Mike Johnson, garnering 67% of the vote in 2004. In 2006, Herger faced Arjinderpal Sekhon and received 64% of the vote. In 2008, Herger faced Trinity County Supervisor Jeff Morris, who did somewhat better, holding Herger to 57% of the vote.

In 2010, Herger faced a Republican primary challenge from retired Colonel Pete Stiglich, and ran in the general against Democrat Jim Reed, a lawyer who divides his time between the Bay Area and Fall River. Herger prevailed with 57% of the vote.

=== Tenure ===
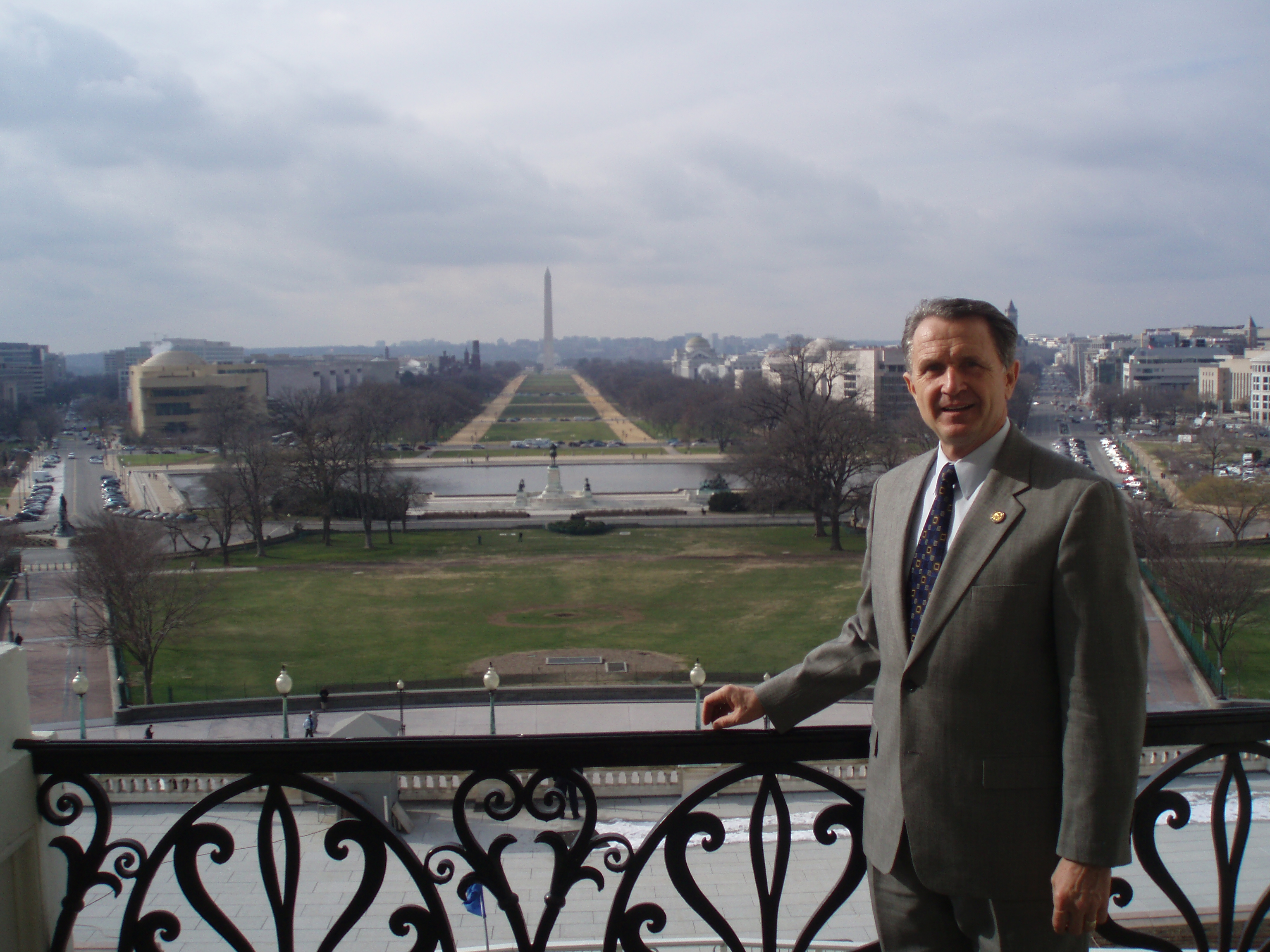
Wally Herger on the Speaker's Balcony overlooking the National Mall.

Herger served on the influential United States House Committee on Ways and Means since his tenure began as a federal representative. Within Ways and Means, Representative Herger served on two subcommittees, the Subcommittee on Trade, and the Subcommittee on Income Security and Family Support. In the 110th Congress he was named the Ranking Member of the Republican (minority) delegation to the Trade Subcommittee. Representative Herger's participation in full committee is limited to Ways and Means, in accordance with the rules of the Committee on Ways and Means. While he chaired the Subcommittee on Income Security and Family Support (called the Subcommittee on Human Resources during his watch) beginning with the 107th Congress, he played a leading role in the reauthorization and expansion of the 1996 welfare reform law. He sponsored the Criminal Welfare Prevention Act, passed as part of the larger 1996 Welfare Reform Law. This bill gave additional financial incentives to law enforcement agencies that identified fraudulent recipients of aid.

On August 18, 2009, Herger triggered controversy when he attended a town hall meeting in Redding, California, where an audience member introduced himself as a "proud right-wing terrorist" The person admitted to reporters in a private interview ten days later, after the controversy had reached national attention, that he had misspoken, having intended to say "extremist". Herger did not immediately distance himself from the remark then and there, but, instead, after the constituent's lengthy comment, responded by saying, "Amen. God bless you. There goes a great American." Many people, both inside and outside Herger's congressional district found his failure to respond immediately unacceptable. Herger's gaffe attained the apotheosis of national media attention when Keith Olbermann picked the story up for his show Countdown with Keith Olbermann on August 28, 2009.

Legislative goals

The 2nd congressional district is driven by agriculture. Herger supported legislation to bolster free and fair trade in an effort to support his constituency. Congressman Herger, from his position on the Trade Subcommittee, planned to lead the consideration of trade agreements with foreign nations. He worked on the Herger-Feinstein Quincy Library Group Forest Recovery Act, which instituted a framework for managing federal forest assets that will be tested on federal lands in Lassen, Plumas, and Tehama counties, and has been negotiated by a diverse coalition that includes environmental and logging interests. The act aims to reduce vegetation density in Forest Service lands, while expanding forest biodiversity (i.e. reduction of "monoculture" forests).

Congressmen Herger and Meek (D-FL) drafted a bill to repeal the three percent withholding tax scheduled to begin in 2011. The withholding tax would apply to governments with expenditures of greater than US$100 million on services from for-profit companies. The law mandates that governments will only deliver 97 percent of a contract to the contractor, and send the remaining 3% to the IRS. Vendors and contractors are expected to increase their bid values to cover this new cost. The National Association of Counties thinks that this will give Counties a competitive disadvantage when dealing with vendors and contractors. (Counties assess costs of federal '3-percent withholding law')

=== Committee assignments ===
- Committee on Ways and Means
  - Subcommittee on Trade
  - Subcommittee on Health (Chair)

=== Caucus memberships ===
- Congressional Biomass Caucus
- Congressional Caucus on Turkey and Turkish Americans
- Republican Study Committee
- Tea Party Caucus

== Personal life ==
Herger is married to Pamela Sargent, with whom he has 9 children and 19 grandchildren. He is a member of The Church of Jesus Christ of Latter-day Saints.

== Electoral history ==
California's 2nd Congressional District House Election, 1986
Party	Candidate	Votes	%
Republican	Wally Herger	109,758	58.25
Democratic	Stephen C. Swendiman	74,602	39.60
Libertarian	Harry Hugh "Doc" Pendery	4,054	2.15

California's 2nd Congressional District House Election, 1988
Party	Candidate	Votes	%
Republican	Wally Herger (Incumbent)	139,010	58.82
Democratic	Wayne R. Meyer	91,088	38.54
Libertarian	Harry Hugh "Doc" Pendery	6,253	2.65

California's 2nd Congressional District House Election, 1990
Party	Candidate	Votes	%
Republican	Wally Herger (Incumbent)	133,315	63.67
Democratic	Erwin E. "Bill" Rush	65,333	31.20
Libertarian	Ross Crain	10,753	5.14

California's 2nd Congressional District House Election, 1992
Party	Candidate	Votes	%
Republican	Wally Herger (Incumbent)	167,247	65.19
Democratic	Elliot Roy Freedman	71,780	27.98
Libertarian	Harry H. "Doc" Pendery	17,529	6.83

California's 2nd Congressional District House Election, 1994
Party	Candidate	Votes	%
Republican	Wally Herger (Incumbent)	137,864	64.17
Democratic	Mary Jacobs	55,959	26.04
American Independent	Devvy Kidd	15,619	7.27
Libertarian	Harry H. "Doc" Pendery	5,418	2.52

California's 2nd Congressional District House Election, 1996
Party	Candidate	Votes	%
Republican	Wally Herger (Incumbent)	144,913	60.80
Democratic	Roberts Braden	80,401	33.74
Natural Law	Patrice Thiessen	7,253	3.04
Libertarian	William Brunner	5,759	2.42

California's 2nd Congressional District House Election, 1998
Party	Candidate	Votes	%
Republican	Wally Herger (Incumbent)	128,372	62.52
Democratic	Roberts "Rob" Braden	70,837	34.50
Natural Law	Patrice Thiessen	6,138	2.99

California's 2nd Congressional District House Election, 2000
Party	Candidate	Votes	%
Republican	Wally Herger (Incumbent)	168,172	65.73
Democratic	Stan Morgan	72,075	28.17
Natural Law	John McDermott	8,910	3.48
Libertarian	Charles R. Martin	6,699	2.62

California's 2nd Congressional District House Election, 2002
Party	Candidate	Votes	%
Republican	Wally Herger (Incumbent)	117,747	65.79
Democratic	Mike Johnson	52,455	29.31
Natural Law	Patrice Thiessen	4,860	2.72
Libertarian	Charles R. Martin	3,923	2.19

California's 2nd Congressional District House Election, 2004
Party	Candidate	Votes	%
Republican	Wally Herger (Incumbent)	182,119	66.85
Democratic	Mike Johnson	90,310	33.15

California's 2nd Congressional District House Election, 2006
Party	Candidate	Votes	%
Republican	Wally Herger (Incumbent)	134,911	64.18
Democratic	Arjinderpal Sekhon	68,234	32.46
Libertarian	E. Kent Hinesley	7,057	3.36

California's 2nd Congressional District House Election, 2008
Party	Candidate	Votes	%
Republican	Wally Herger (Incumbent)	163,459	57.90
Democratic	Jeffrey W. Morris	118,878	42.11

California's 2nd Congressional District House Election, 2010
Party	Candidate	Votes	%
Republican	Wally Herger (Incumbent)	130,837	57.15
Democratic	Jim Reed	98,092	42.85

U.S. House of Representatives
Preceded by Eugene A. Chappie	Member of the U.S. House of Representatives from California's 2nd congressional district 1987–2013	Succeeded by Jared Huffman
U.S. order of precedence (ceremonial)
Preceded by Elton Gallegly as Former U.S. Representative	Order of precedence of the United States as Former U.S. Representative	Succeeded by Ed Royce as Former U.S. Representative
