= Sutter, California =

Census-designated place in California, US

Sutter South Butte, Sutter City
- census-designated place
- Location in Sutter County and the state of California
- Coordinates: 39°9′44″N 121°44′59″W
- Country: United States
- State: California
- County: Sutter
- South Butte: August 7, 1871
- Sutter City: January 20, 1888
- Sutter: January 26, 1895

Area
  - Total: 3.025 sq mi (7.835 km^{2})
  - Land: 3.025 sq mi (7.835 km^{2})
  - Water: 0 sq mi (0 km^{2}) 0%
- Elevation: 75 ft (23 m)

Population (2020)
  - Total: 2,997
  - Density: 990.7/sq mi (382.5/km^{2})
- Time zone: UTC-8 (Pacific (PST))
  - Summer (DST): UTC-7 (PDT)
- ZIP code: 95982
- Area code: 530
- FIPS code: 06-77378
- GNIS feature ID: 0255919

Sutter, formerly South Butte and Sutter City, is a census-designated place (CDP) in Sutter County, California, United States. It is part of the Yuba City Metropolitan Statistical Area within the Greater Sacramento CSA. The population as of the 2020 census was 2,997, up from 2,904 at the 2010 census.

== History ==
Originally a settlement called South Butte, established in the vicinity of the stage station at Butte House east of the current town. It had a post office from August 7, 1871, until December 17, 1878, and from February 18, 1879, to January 20, 1888, when it was moved to the new Sutter City Post Office nearby. The Sutter Cemetery (originally South Butte Cemetery) lay to the west on the stage road (in former times used mostly by stagecoaches), and beside it was the school house, that had its classes dismissed when there was a funeral.

Sutter City was the result of an attempt to take advantage of the boom in California in the late 1880s. The town was located south of the Cemetery along the path of a railroad line projected to pass through the town and it hoped to become the new county seat, because it was near the geographical center of the county. However the rail line was never built and it never became the county seat.

The Sutter City post office name was changed to Sutter on January 26, 1895.

== Geography ==
According to the United States Census Bureau, the CDP covers an area of 3.0 square miles (7.8 km^{2}), all land.

== Demographics ==
Historical population
Census	Pop.	Note	%±
1960	1,219		—
1970	1,488		22.1%
1980	2,225		49.5%
1990	2,606		17.1%
2000	2,885		10.7%
2010	2,904		0.7%
2020	2,997		3.2%
U.S. Decennial Census; 1960 1970 1980; 1990 2000 2010

=== 2020 census ===
As of the 2020 census, Sutter had a population of 2,997. The population density was 990.7 inhabitants per square mile (382.5/km^{2}). The median age was 38.6 years. For every 100 females there were 101.5 males, and for every 100 females age 18 and over there were 96.9 males age 18 and over.

The Census reported that 2,997 people (100% of the population) lived in households. The age distribution was 25.0% under the age of 18, 6.8% aged 18 to 24, 25.9% aged 25 to 44, 27.7% aged 45 to 64, and 14.6% who were 65 years of age or older.

There were 1,064 households, out of which 34.1% had children under the age of 18 living in them. Of all households, 59.8% were married-couple households, 6.3% were cohabiting couple households, 18.6% had a female householder with no spouse or partner present, and 15.3% had a male householder with no spouse or partner present. About 18.1% of households were made up of individuals and 8.6% had someone living alone who was 65 years of age or older. The average household size was 2.82. There were 811 families (76.2% of all households).

There were 1,097 housing units, of which 1,064 (97.0%) were occupied and 3.0% were vacant. Of occupied units, 73.5% were owner-occupied and 26.5% were occupied by renters. The homeowner vacancy rate was 0.3% and the rental vacancy rate was 2.8%.

0.0% of residents lived in urban areas, while 100.0% lived in rural areas.

Racial composition as of the 2020 census
Race	Number	Percent
White	2,337	78.0%
Black or African American	6	0.2%
American Indian and Alaska Native	46	1.5%
Asian	33	1.1%
Native Hawaiian and Other Pacific Islander	0	0.0%
Some other race	245	8.2%
Two or more races	330	11.0%
Hispanic or Latino (of any race)	498	16.6%

=== Income and poverty ===
In 2023, the US Census Bureau estimated that the median household income was $94,375, and the per capita income was $42,615. About 3.6% of families and 4.0% of the population were below the poverty line.

=== 2010 census ===
The 2010 United States census reported that Sutter had a population of 2,904. The population density was 956.7 inhabitants per square mile (369.4/km^{2}). The racial makeup of Sutter was 2,503 (86.2%) White, (0.6%) African American, (0.9%) Native American, 30 (1.0%) Asian, 1 (0.0%) Pacific Islander, 160 (5.5%) from other races, and 140 (4.8%) from two or more races. Hispanic or Latino of any race were 410 persons (14.1%).

The Census reported that 2,904 people (100% of the population) lived in households, 0 (0%) lived in non-institutionalized group quarters, and 0 (0%) were institutionalized.

There were 1,021 households, out of which 428 (41.9%) had children under the age of 18 living in them, 605 (59.3%) were opposite-sex married couples living together, 127 (12.4%) had a female householder with no husband present, 68 (6.7%) had a male householder with no wife present. There were 53 (5.2%) unmarried opposite-sex partnerships, and 7 (0.7%) same-sex married couples or partnerships. 177 households (17.3%) were made up of individuals, and 92 (9.0%) had someone living alone who was 65 years of age or older. The average household size was 2.84. There were 800 families (78.4% of all households); the average family size was 3.18.

The population was spread out, with 791 people (27.2%) under the age of 18, 255 people (8.8%) aged 18 to 24, 652 people (22.5%) aged 25 to 44, 856 people (29.5%) aged 45 to 64, and 350 people (12.1%) who were 65 years of age or older. The median age was 39.1 years. For every 100 females, there were 105.1 males. For every 100 females age 18 and over, there were 102.0 males.

There were 1,082 housing units at an average density of 356.4 per square mile (137.6/km^{2}), of which 777 (76.1%) were owner-occupied, and 244 (23.9%) were occupied by renters. The homeowner vacancy rate was 2.1%; the rental vacancy rate was 3.9%. 2,198 people (75.7% of the population) lived in owner-occupied housing units and 706 people (24.3%) lived in rental housing units.

== Media ==
MySYtv.com provides television coverage of local events in the area.

== Politics ==
In the state legislature, Sutter is in the 1st senatorial district, represented by Republican Megan Dahle, and in the 3rd Assembly district, represented by Vacant.

Federally, Sutter is in California's 1st congressional district, represented by Republican James Gallagher.
