= Live Oak, Sutter County, California =

City in California, United States

City of Live Oak
- City
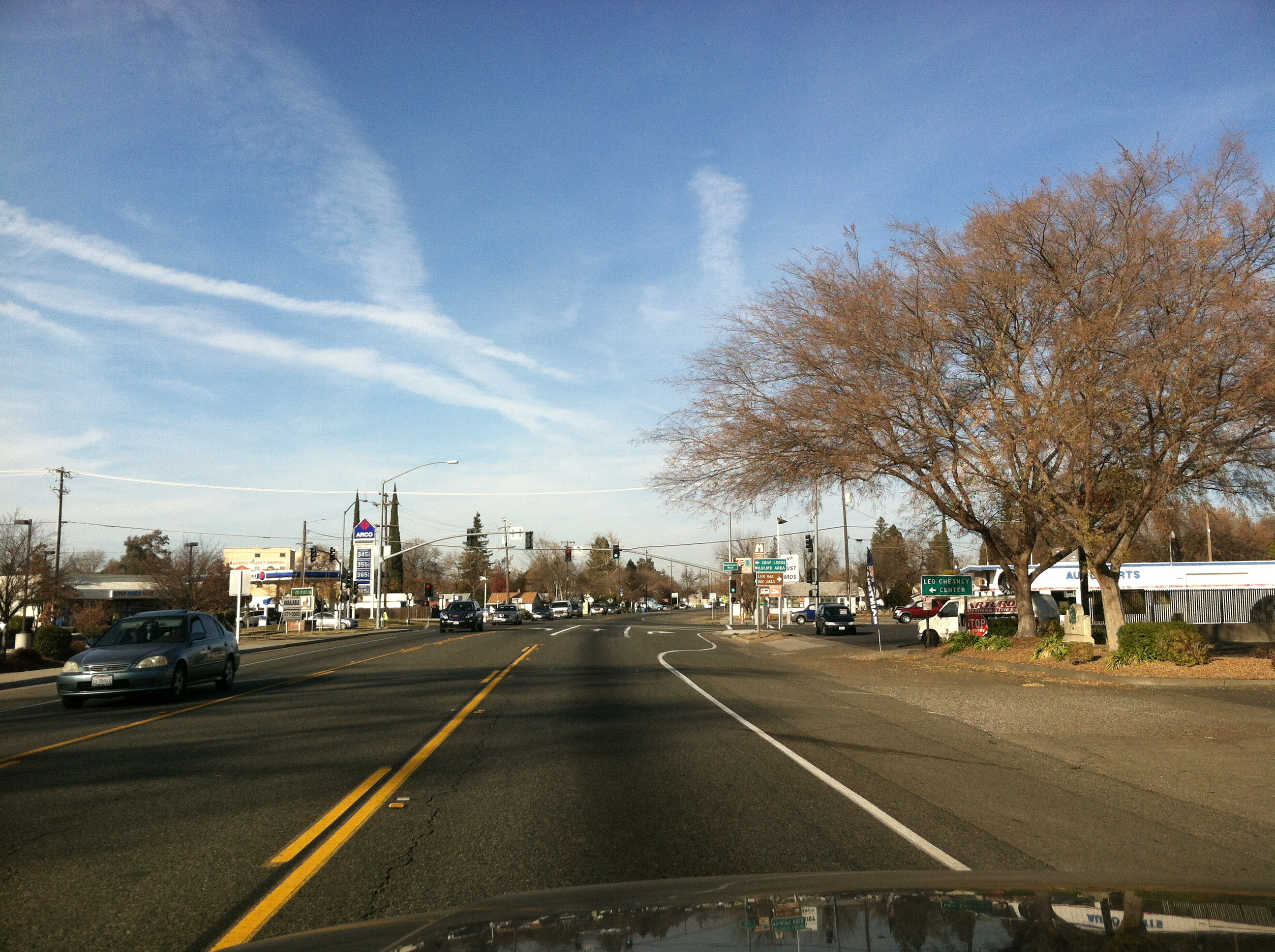
- Live Oak, California. On Live Oak blvd and Pennington Road access to Leo Cheney Correctional Center.
- Interactive map of City of Live Oak
- Location in the United States
- Coordinates: 39°16′33″N 121°39′36″W
- Country: United States
- State: California
- County: Sutter
- Incorporated: January 22, 1947

Government
  - Type: Council-Manager
  - Mayor: Jeramy Chapdelaine

Area
  - Total: 3.12 sq mi (8.08 km^{2})
  - Land: 3.12 sq mi (8.08 km^{2})
  - Water: 0 sq mi (0.00 km^{2}) 0%
- Elevation: 79 ft (24 m)

Population (2020)
  - Total: 9,106
  - Density: 2,855.5/sq mi (1,102.52/km^{2})
- Time zone: UTC-8 (Pacific (PST))
  - Summer (DST): UTC-7 (PDT)
- ZIP codes: 95953
- Area code: 530
- FIPS code: 06-41936
- GNIS feature IDs: 277541, 2410846
- Website: www.liveoakcity.org

Live Oak is an incorporated city in Sutter County, California, United States. It is part of the Yuba City Metropolitan Statistical Area within the Greater Sacramento CSA, and includes a hamlet historically named Stafford. The population was 9,106 at the 2020 census, up from 8,392 at the 2010 census.

== Geography ==
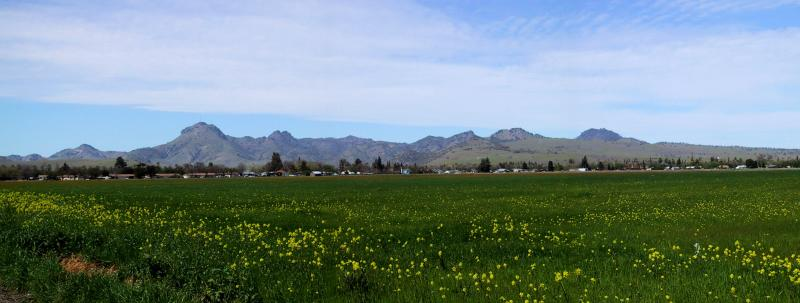
The Sutter Buttes in Northern California

Live Oak is located at 39°16′28″N 121°39′43″W (39.274518, -121.662003).

According to the United States Census Bureau, the city has a total area of 3.1 square miles (8.0 km^{2}), all land. Live Oak is an agricultural community located in the fertile Sacramento Valley. Rich farmlands, orchards, the Feather River, and the Sutter Buttes surround Live Oak.

== Climate ==
Live Oak's climate usually consists of hot, dry summers and prolonging wet, cool winters, a Mediterranean climate. Summers are hot, sunny and dry but a delta breeze occurs at times. This cools the temperature but doesn't last long. Heat waves occur during the summer months, lasting for 3–5 days on average. Temperatures range from 105 to 110 degrees. Dry months range from mid to late May to early to mid September where rainfall is rare. The hottest month is July with temperatures averaging around 96 to 100 degrees with no rain but it isn't rare for some rain to arrive from the Southwest Monsoon. Winters are prolonging wet, cool and foggy. Wet months range from mid October to mid April where rainfall becomes constant. January is the wettest and coolest month with rainfall averaging between 4 and 6 inches but during El Niño season, rainfall averages 10 to 12 inches which causes major flooding. During the La Niña season, rainfall averages 4 inches or below, causing drought problems during summer. In the winter, temperatures average 45 to 50 degrees. Foggy and cloudy weather can last up to 2 to 4 weeks, also known as Tule fog. Snow occurs rarely. The record amount of snow was 3.8 inches in 2002.

Monthly climate averages (1973–2006)
Month	High (°F)	Low (°F)	Precip. (inches)
January	54	35	4.97
February	59	39	4.34
March	65	41	3.78
April	74	45	1.78
May	85	50	0.89
June	94	56	0.21
July	95	61	0.08
August	94	61	0.09
September	87	56	0.51
October	76	47	1.56
November	60	41	3.67
December	55	38	3.89

== Demographics ==
Historical population
Census	Pop.	Note	%±
1950	1,770		—
1960	2,276		28.6%
1970	2,645		16.2%
1980	3,103		17.3%
1990	4,320		39.2%
2000	6,229		44.2%
2010	8,392		34.7%
2020	9,106		8.5%
U.S. Decennial Census

=== 2020 ===
The 2020 United States census reported that Live Oak had a population of 9,106. The population density was 2,917.7 inhabitants per square mile (1,126.5/km^{2}). The racial makeup of Live Oak was 37.0% White, 1.5% African American, 1.9% Native American, 13.7% Asian, 0.5% Pacific Islander, 30.3% from other races, and 15.1% from two or more races. Hispanic or Latino of any race were 49.5% of the population.

The census reported that 98.9% of the population lived in households, 0.2% lived in non-institutionalized group quarters, and 0.9% were institutionalized.

There were 2,734 households, out of which 47.7% included children under the age of 18, 52.9% were married-couple households, 6.6% were cohabiting couple households, 25.0% had a female householder with no partner present, and 15.5% had a male householder with no partner present. 17.8% of households were one person, and 8.9% were one person aged 65 or older. The average household size was 3.29. There were 2,100 families (76.8% of all households).

The age distribution was 28.3% under the age of 18, 9.6% aged 18 to 24, 26.2% aged 25 to 44, 22.4% aged 45 to 64, and 13.5% who were 65 years of age or older. The median age was 33.8 years. For every 100 females, there were 96.6 males.

There were 2,836 housing units at an average density of 908.7 units per square mile (350.9 units/km^{2}), of which 2,734 (96.4%) were occupied. Of these, 63.1% were owner-occupied, and 36.9% were occupied by renters.

In 2023, the US Census Bureau estimated that 26.4% of the population were foreign-born. Of all people aged 5 or older, 55.1% spoke only English at home, 27.0% spoke Spanish, 14.8% spoke other Indo-European languages, 2.1% spoke Asian or Pacific Islander languages, and 0.9% spoke other languages. Of those aged 25 or older, 71.7% were high school graduates and 13.3% had a bachelor's degree.

The median household income in 2023 was $66,590, and the per capita income was $25,986. About 11.8% of families and 15.1% of the population were below the poverty line.

=== 2010 ===
The 2010 United States census reported that Live Oak had a population of 8,392. The population density was 4,491.3 inhabitants per square mile (1,734.1/km^{2}). The racial makeup of Live Oak was 4,491 (53.5%) White, 138 (1.6%) African American, 130 (1.5%) Native American, 978 (11.7%) Asian, 17 (0.2%) Pacific Islander, 2,173 (25.9%) from other races, and 465 (5.5%) from two or more races. Hispanic or Latino of any race were 4,093 persons (48.8%).

The Census reported that 7,972 people (95.0% of the population) lived in households, 22 (0.3%) lived in non-institutionalized group quarters, and 398 (4.7%) were institutionalized.

There were 2,331 households, out of which 1,161 (49.8%) had children under the age of 18 living in them, 1,402 (60.1%) were opposite-sex married couples living together, 296 (12.7%) had a female householder with no husband present, 147 (6.3%) had a male householder with no wife present. There were 121 (5.2%) unmarried opposite-sex partnerships, and 13 (0.6%) same-sex married couples or partnerships. 400 households (17.2%) were made up of individuals, and 186 (8.0%) had someone living alone who was 65 years of age or older. The average household size was 3.42. There were 1,845 families (79.2% of all households); the average family size was 3.88.

The population was spread out, with 2,571 people (30.6%) under the age of 18, 816 people (9.7%) aged 18 to 24, 2,356 people (28.1%) aged 25 to 44, 1,753 people (20.9%) aged 45 to 64, and 896 people (10.7%) who were 65 years of age or older. The median age was 31.7 years. For every 100 females, there were 89.9 males. For every 100 females age 18 and over, there were 87.1 males.

There were 2,498 housing units at an average density of 1,336.9 units per square mile (516.2 units/km^{2}), of which 1,535 (65.9%) were owner-occupied, and 796 (34.1%) were occupied by renters. The homeowner vacancy rate was 2.6%; the rental vacancy rate was 8.2%. 5,306 people (63.2% of the population) lived in owner-occupied housing units and 2,666 people (31.8%) lived in rental housing units.

== Education ==
- Live Oak Child Care Center ages 3–5
- Live Oak Headstart Preschool
- Live Oak Luther Elementary School kindergarten-5
- Live Oak Middle School grades 6–8
- Live Oak High School grades 9–12
- Encinal Elementary School grades K-8
- Nuestro Elementary School grades K-8

== Government ==
In the California State Legislature, Live Oak is in the 1st senatorial district, represented by Republican Megan Dahle, and in the 3rd Assembly district, represented by Vacant.

Federally, Live Oak is in California's 1st congressional district, represented by Republican James Gallagher.

== Emergency services ==
=== Fire ===
Live Oak has a fire department which is part of the Sutter County Fire Department.

=== Law Enforcement ===
Until the mid-1970s, Live Oak had its own police department. In the 1970s the city decided to contract out services from the Sutter County Sheriff's Department.

There is a dedicated group of deputies from the Sheriff's Department who are stationed in and patrol mainly in the Live Oak contract area, making for a more effective patrol and more community oriented department.

The city has a substation staffed with seven patrol deputies, a Sergeant and a Lieutenant. The city also has a K9 unit to exclusively patrol the Live Oak area.

=== EMS ===
Emergency Medical Services (EMS), including ambulance/paramedics, are covered by the Bi-County Ambulance company, which covers both Sutter and Yuba County areas.

=== Emergency Services Headquarters ===
Both the Sheriff's Department Live Oak Sub Station and the Live Oak Fire Department are located at the corner of Fir Street and O Street in Live Oak.

== Business ==
The city's economy relies mainly on agricultural production. Its minimum-security Leo Chesney prison, located on nearly 10 acres a few blocks west of downtown Live Oak, directly abuts residential neighborhoods on its north and east perimeters. It held up to 195 women inmates. It is owned by the CoreCivic corporation, but was operated by Cornell Companies, of Houston, Texas, then after 2010 by Boca Raton, Florida's GEO Group after Cornell's purchase by its larger competitor. It has been vacant since 2011.

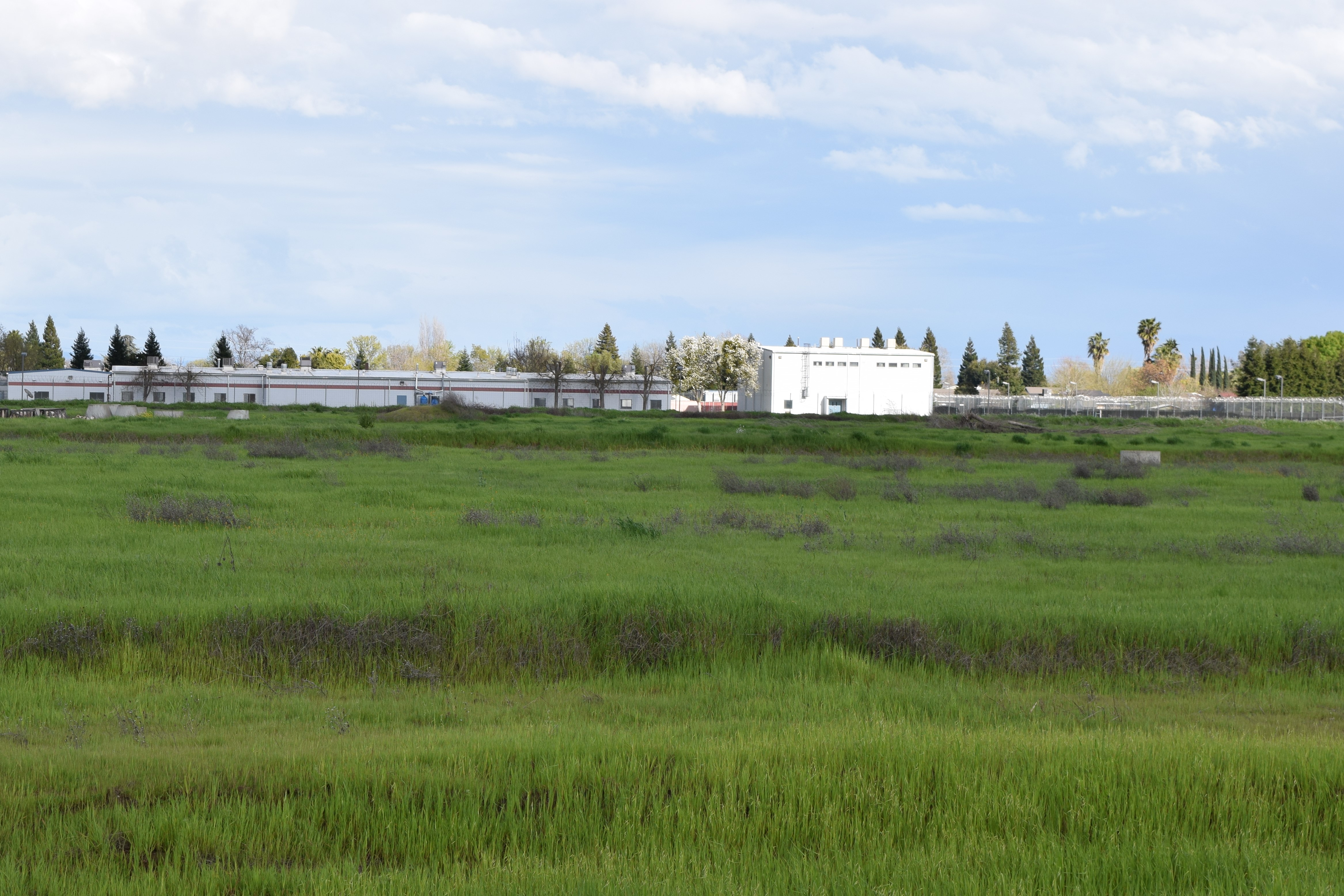
For-profit CoreCivic corporation's Leo Chesney prison

== See also ==
- List of cities in California
- List of communities in California
