= Sutter County, California =

County in California, United States

Coordinates: 39.04°N 121.69°W

Sutter County
- County
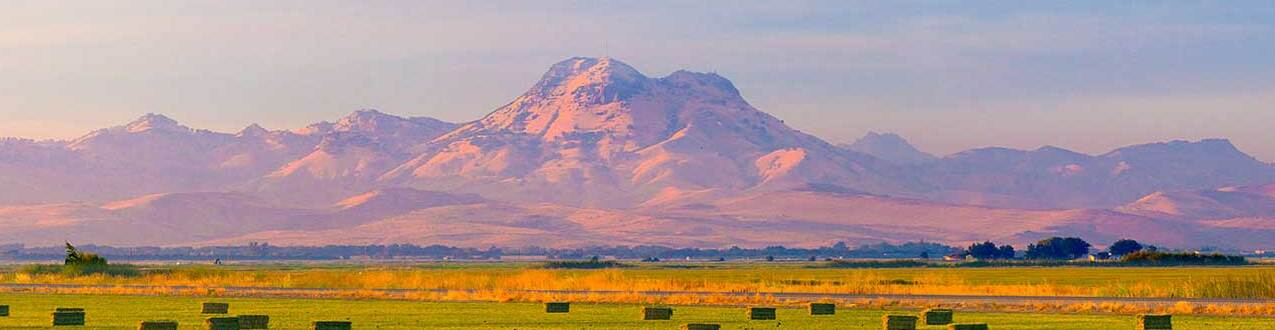
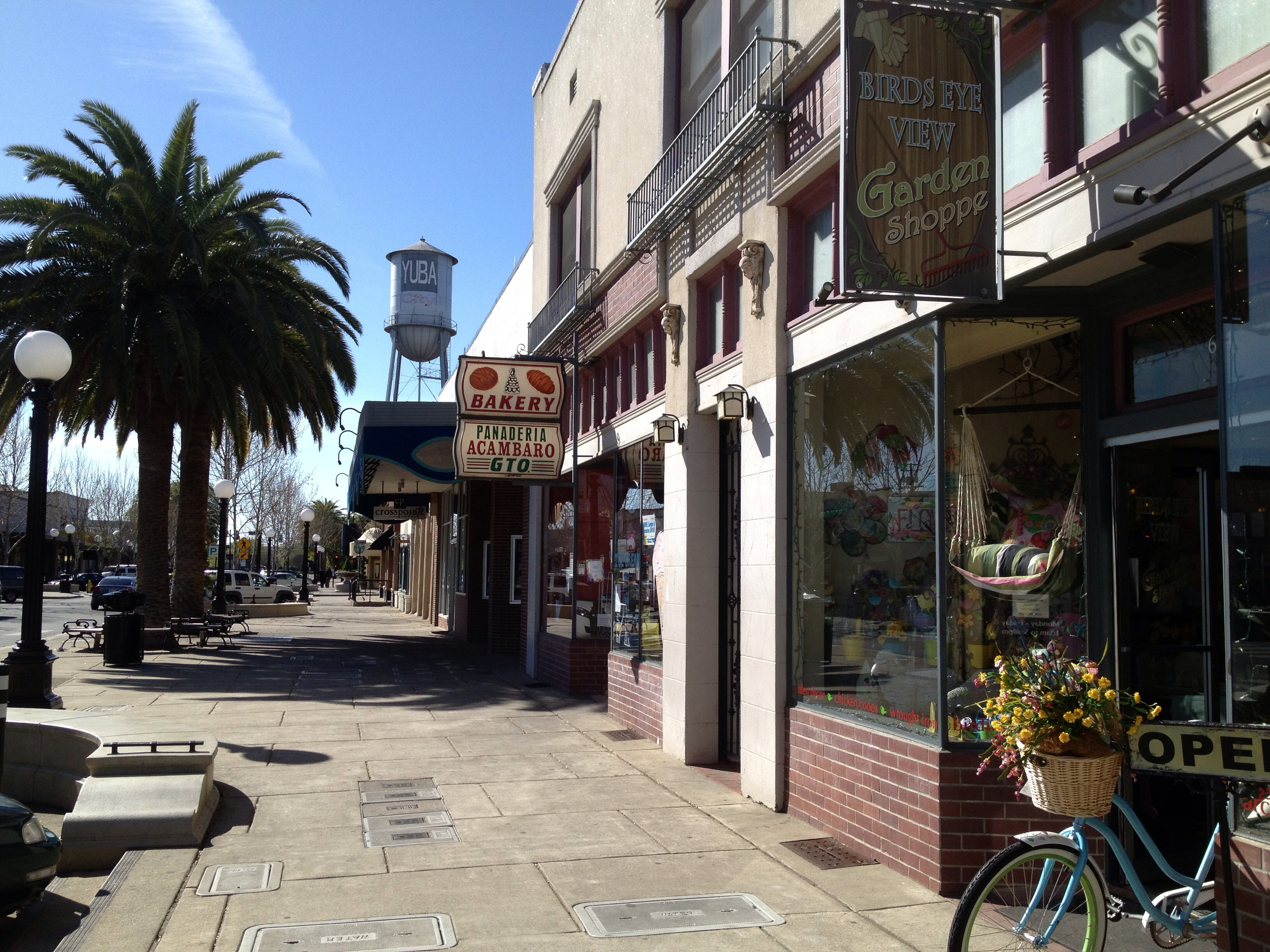
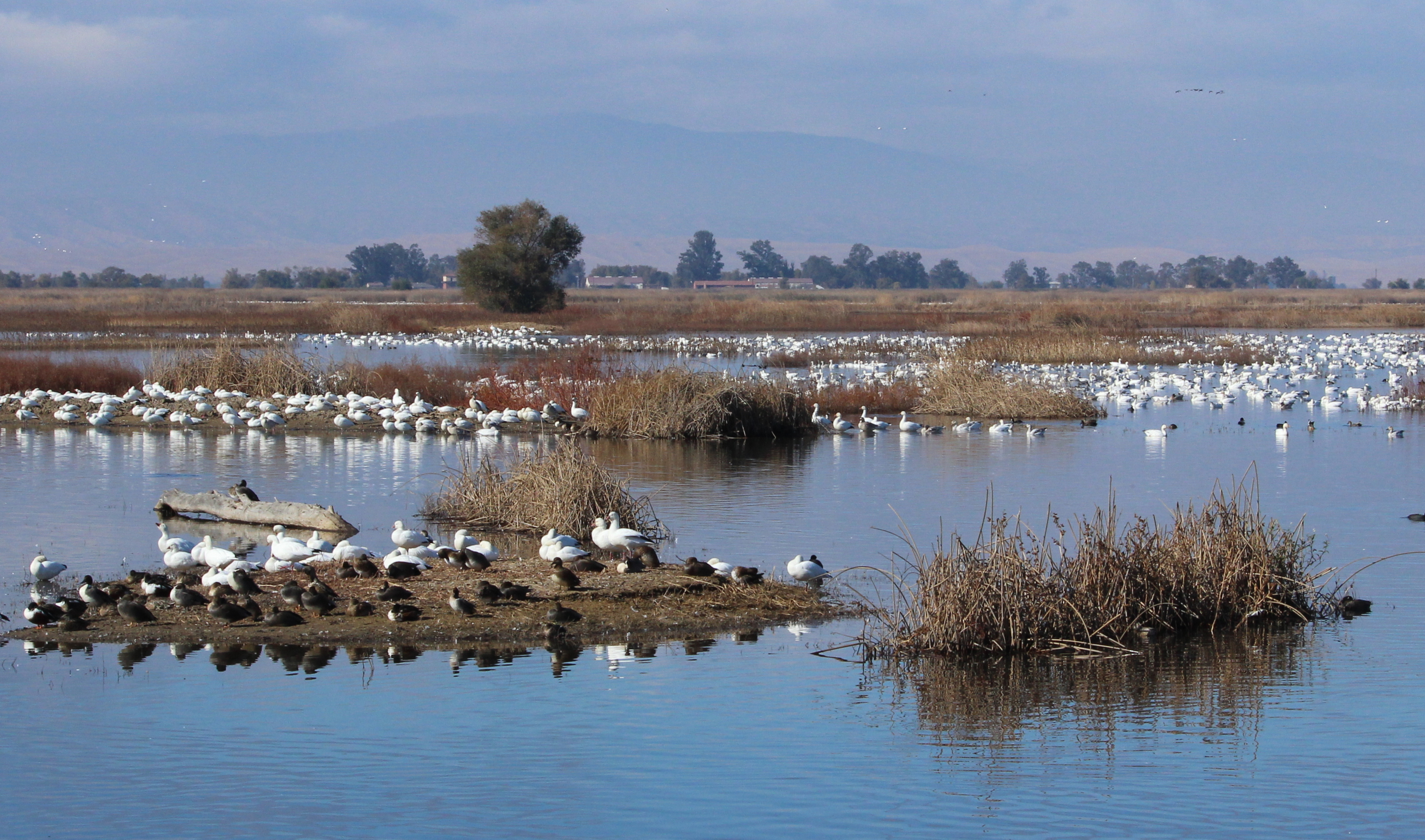
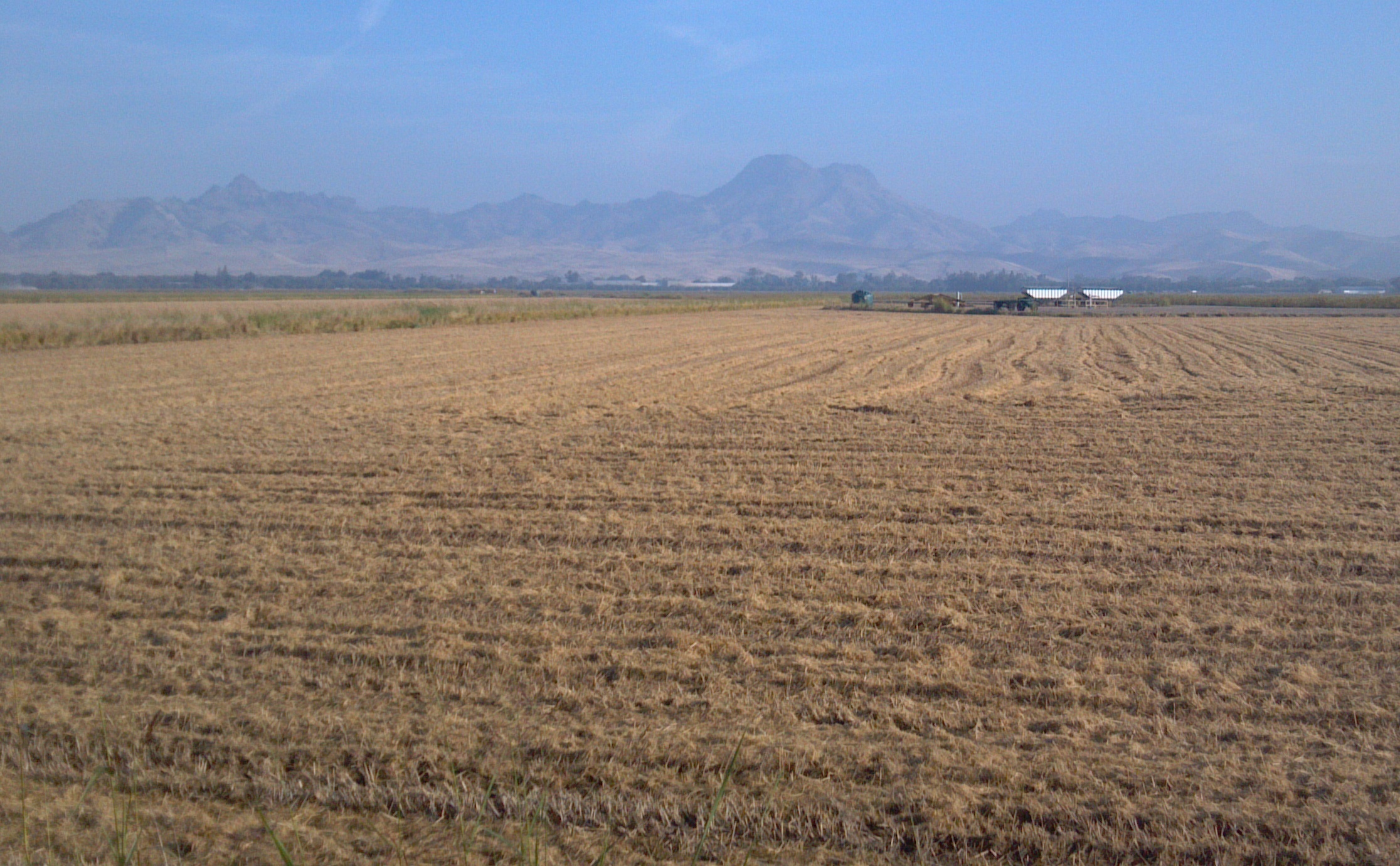
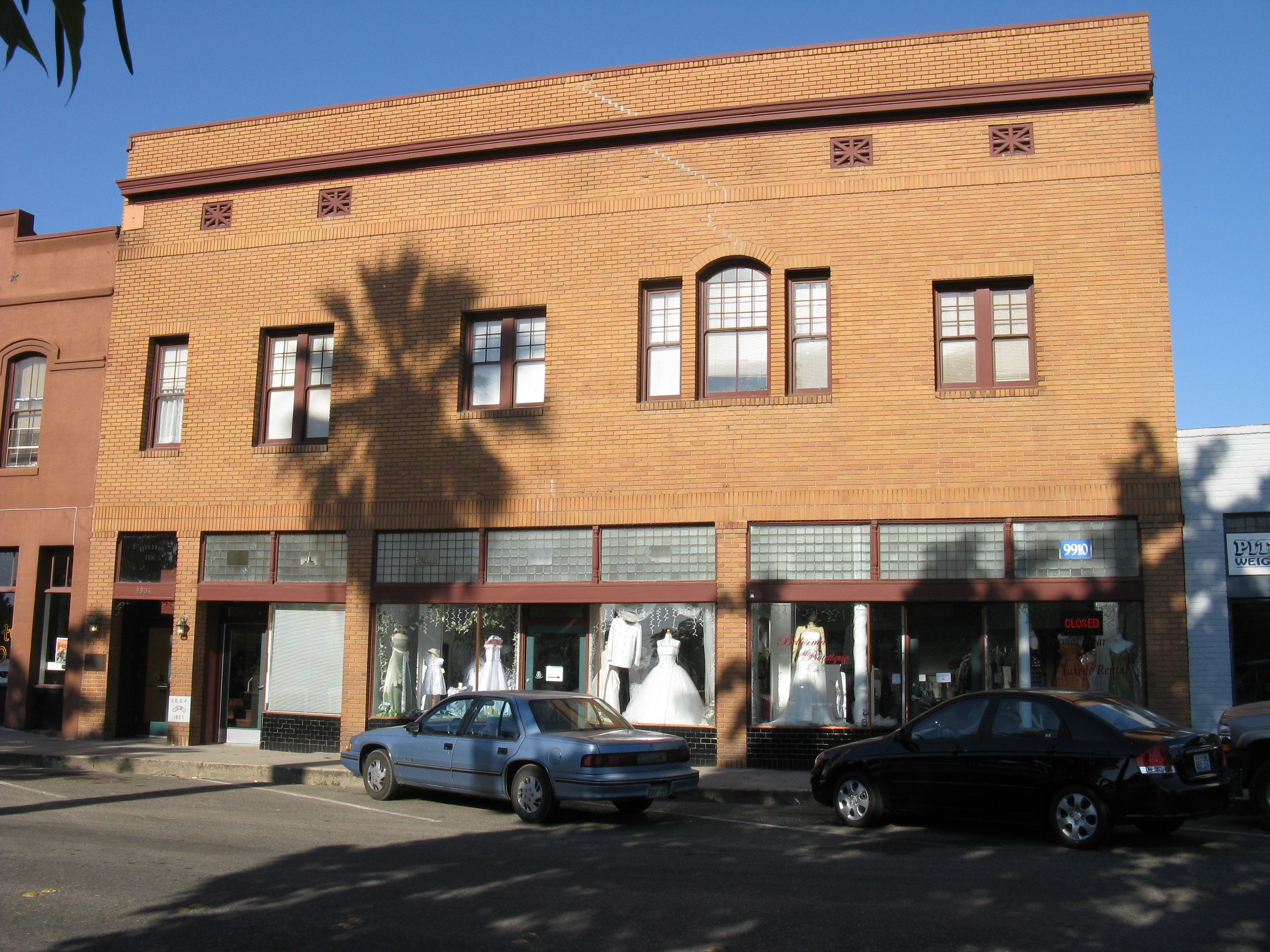
- Sutter Buttes in the Sacramento Valley Yuba City Sutter Wildlife Refuge Tudor Live Oak

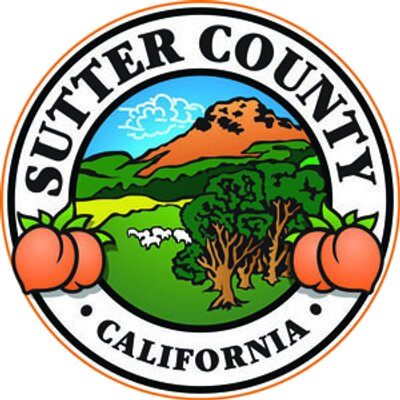
- Seal
- Interactive map of Sutter County
- Location in the state of California
- Country: United States
- State: California
- Region: Sacramento Valley
- Metro area: Yuba City metropolitan area
- Incorporated: February 18, 1850
- Named for: John Augustus Sutter
- County seat: Yuba City
- Largest city: Yuba City

Government
  - Type: Council–CAO
  - Body: Board of Supervisors
  - Chair: Dan Flores
  - Vice Chair: Mike Ziegenmeyer
  - Board of Supervisors: Supervisors: Jeff Boone; Dan Flores; Mike Ziegenmeyer; Karm Bains; Jeff Stephens
  - County Administrator: Steve Smith

Area
  - Total: 608 sq mi (1,570 km^{2})
  - Land: 602 sq mi (1,560 km^{2})
  - Water: 6.1 sq mi (16 km^{2})
- Highest elevation: 2,120 ft (650 m)

Population (April 1, 2020)
  - Total: 99,633
  - Estimate (2025): 98,787 ▼
  - Density: 166/sq mi (63.9/km^{2})

GDP
  - Total: $4.840 billion (2022)
- Time zone: UTC-8 (Pacific Time Zone)
  - Summer (DST): UTC-7 (Pacific Daylight Time)
- Congressional district: 1st
- Website: www.sutter.gov

Sutter County is located in the U.S. state of California. As of the 2020 census, the population was 99,633. The county seat is Yuba City. Sutter County is included in the Yuba City, CA Metropolitan Statistical Area as well as the Sacramento-Roseville, CA Combined Statistical Area. The county is located along the Sacramento River in the Sacramento Valley.

== History ==
The Maidu were the people living in the area of Sutter County when European settlers arrived.

Sutter County was one of the original counties of California, created in 1850 at the time of statehood. Parts of the county were given to Placer County in 1852.

Sutter County is named after John Augustus Sutter, a German native born to Swiss parents. He was one of the first Europeans to recognize the Sacramento Valley for its potential in agriculture. His Hock Farm, established in 1841 on the Feather River just south of present-day Yuba City, was the site of the first major farm in the Central Valley, and used extensive slave labor from Natives in order to function.

Sutter obtained the Rancho New Helvetia Mexican land grant, and called his first settlement New Helvetia (which included the present day city of Sacramento). In 1850, Sutter retired to Hock Farm when the gold rush led to him losing his holdings in Sacramento.

Sutter County is the birthplace (Yuba City, 1858) of John Joseph Montgomery, who was the first American to successfully pilot a heavier-than-air craft, 20 years before the Wright Brothers, and who held the first patent for an "aeroplane."

In the 1890s, Sutter County was one of the two prohibition counties in California; the other was Riverside County. Both outlawed saloons and sale or consumption of alcohol in public.

== Geography ==
According to the U.S. Census Bureau, the county has a total area of 608 square miles (1,570 km^{2}), of which 602 square miles (1,560 km^{2}) is land and 6.1 square miles (16 km^{2}), comprising 1.0%, is water. It is the fourth-smallest county in California by total area. Some 88 percent of the county is prime farmland and grazing land.

Sutter County is home to the Sutter Buttes, known as the "World's Smallest Mountain Range." This volcanic formation provides relief to the otherwise seemingly flat Sacramento Valley.

Bordered by the Sacramento River on the west and the Feather River on the east, Sutter County has 240 miles (390 km) of levees. The Sutter Bypass, which diverts flood waters from the Sacramento River, cuts through the heart of Sutter County.

=== Adjacent counties ===
- Butte County - north
- Yuba County - east
- Placer County - southeast
- Sacramento County - south
- Yolo County - southwest
- Colusa County - west

=== National protected areas ===
- Butte Sink National Wildlife Refuge (part)
- Sutter National Wildlife Refuge

Sutter County also has the State Feather River Wildlife Area, consisting of the Nelson Slough, O'Connor Lakes, Abbott Lake, Shanghai Bend, and Morse Road Units in Sutter County. Also, a 1,795-acre (7.26 km^{2}) State Park in the Sutter Buttes. In addition, there are the state public trust lands of the Feather, Bear and Sacramento rivers as well as smaller streams including Butte Creek and Butte Slough.

== Transportation ==
=== Major highways ===
- State Route 20
- State Route 70
- State Route 99
- State Route 113

=== Public transportation ===
Yuba Sutter Transit operates local bus service, as well as commuter runs to Downtown Sacramento. The Amtrak Thruway 3 bus also provides daily connections to/from Sacramento.

=== Airports ===
Sutter County Airport is a general aviation airport located just south of Yuba City. The closest major airport is in Sacramento.

== Government and policing ==
Sutter County is a general law county under the California Constitution. That is, it does not have a county charter. The county is governed by a five-member board of Supervisors. Supervisors are elected by districts for four-year terms. There are no term limits in effect. The chairman and vice-chairman are elected annually by the Board of Supervisors from among its members.

== Politics ==
=== Voter registration statistics ===
Population and registered voters
Total population	94,192	
Registered voters (Note: Percentage of registered voters with respect to total population. Percentages of party members with respect to registered voters follow.)	41,760	44.3%
Democratic	13,557	32.5%
Republican	18,571	44.5%
Democratic–Republican spread	-5,014	-12.0%
American Independent	1,328	3.2%
Green	117	0.3%
Libertarian	224	0.5%
Peace and Freedom	124	0.3%
Americans Elect	1	0.0%
Other	550	1.3%
No party preference	7,288	17.5%

==== Cities by population and voter registration ====
Cities by population and voter registration
City	Population	Registered voters	Democratic	Republican	D–R spread	Other	No party preference
Live Oak	8,244	35.9%	44.5%	29.9%	+14.6%	8.9%	19.6%
Yuba City	64,224	42.6%	34.2%	41.3%	-7.1%	9.2%	18.7%

=== Overview ===
Sutter is a strongly Republican county in presidential and congressional elections. The last Democrat to win the county was Franklin Roosevelt in 1940. It was the only county in the whole state to give a majority to George H. W. Bush in 1992.

United States presidential election results for Sutter County, California
Year	Republican		Democratic		Third party(ies)	
Year	No.	%	No.	%	No.	%
1892	745	47.27%	735	46.64%	96	6.09%
1896	796	51.89%	713	46.48%	25	1.63%
1900	819	54.93%	642	43.06%	30	2.01%
1904	872	60.81%	488	34.03%	74	5.16%
1908	896	54.94%	652	39.98%	83	5.09%
1912	5	0.24%	1,063	51.65%	990	48.10%
1916	1,211	42.00%	1,543	53.52%	129	4.47%
1920	1,862	70.32%	636	24.02%	150	5.66%
1924	1,617	49.92%	367	11.33%	1,255	38.75%
1928	2,239	53.98%	1,875	45.20%	34	0.82%
1932	1,392	25.74%	3,807	70.41%	208	3.85%
1936	1,613	28.11%	4,019	70.04%	106	1.85%
1940	3,089	42.06%	4,195	57.11%	61	0.83%
1944	3,111	49.99%	3,083	49.54%	29	0.47%
1948	3,913	52.47%	3,362	45.08%	183	2.45%
1952	7,053	67.31%	3,382	32.27%	44	0.42%
1956	6,327	62.79%	3,673	36.45%	77	0.76%
1960	7,520	62.91%	4,379	36.63%	55	0.46%
1964	7,241	51.56%	6,787	48.33%	16	0.11%
1968	8,665	59.57%	4,624	31.79%	1,256	8.64%
1972	10,224	62.45%	5,409	33.04%	739	4.51%
1976	8,745	54.21%	6,966	43.18%	420	2.60%
1980	11,778	63.47%	5,103	27.50%	1,676	9.03%
1984	14,477	71.23%	5,535	27.24%	311	1.53%
1988	14,100	67.47%	6,557	31.38%	241	1.15%
1992	12,956	50.10%	7,883	30.48%	5,021	19.42%
1996	14,264	57.64%	8,504	34.37%	1,977	7.99%
2000	17,350	65.31%	8,416	31.68%	798	3.00%
2004	20,254	67.19%	9,602	31.85%	289	0.96%
2008	18,911	57.41%	13,412	40.72%	618	1.88%
2012	18,122	58.41%	12,192	39.30%	712	2.29%
2016	18,176	54.22%	13,076	39.01%	2,271	6.77%
2020	24,375	57.16%	17,367	40.73%	902	2.12%
2024	25,372	64.50%	13,016	33.09%	951	2.42%

In the United States House of Representatives, Sutter County is in California's 3rd congressional district, represented by Independent Kevin Kiley.

In the California State Legislature, the county is in the 4th senatorial district, represented by Republican Marie Alvarado-Gil, and the 3rd Assembly district, represented by Vacant.

On November 4, 2008, Sutter County voted 70.7% for Proposition 8 which amended the California Constitution to ban same-sex marriages.

== Crime ==
The following table includes the number of incidents reported and the rate per 1,000 persons for each type of offense.

Population and crime rates
Population	94,192	
Violent crime	316	3.35
Homicide	1	0.01
Forcible rape	24	0.25
Robbery	54	0.57
Aggravated assault	237	2.52
Property crime	1,038	11.02
Burglary	446	4.74
Larceny-theft (Note: Only larceny-theft cases involving property over $400 in value are reported as property crimes.)	1,474	15.65
Motor vehicle theft	201	2.13
Arson	11	0.12

== Demographics ==
Historical population
Census	Pop.	Note	%±
1850	3,444		—
1860	3,390		−1.6%
1870	5,030		48.4%
1880	5,159		2.6%
1890	5,469		6.0%
1900	5,886		7.6%
1910	6,328		7.5%
1920	10,115		59.8%
1930	14,618		44.5%
1940	18,680		27.8%
1950	26,239		40.5%
1960	33,380		27.2%
1970	41,935		25.6%
1980	52,246		24.6%
1990	64,415		23.3%
2000	78,930		22.5%
2010	94,737		20.0%
2020	99,633		5.2%
2025 (est.)	101,188	▲	1.6%
U.S. Decennial Census; 1790–1960 1900–1990; 1990–2000 2010 2020

=== 2020 census ===
As of the 2020 census, the county had a population of 99,633. The median age was 36.9 years. 25.1% of residents were under the age of 18 and 16.0% of residents were 65 years of age or older. For every 100 females there were 99.1 males, and for every 100 females age 18 and over there were 96.8 males age 18 and over.

The racial makeup of the county was 47.0% White, 2.0% Black or African American, 1.9% American Indian and Alaska Native, 18.3% Asian, 0.3% Native Hawaiian and Pacific Islander, 18.0% from some other race, and 12.5% from two or more races. Hispanic or Latino residents of any race comprised 31.7% of the population.

84.9% of residents lived in urban areas, while 15.1% lived in rural areas.

There were 33,062 households in the county, of which 38.9% had children under the age of 18 living with them and 24.4% had a female householder with no spouse or partner present. About 20.6% of all households were made up of individuals and 10.2% had someone living alone who was 65 years of age or older.

There were 34,499 housing units, of which 4.2% were vacant. Among occupied housing units, 60.3% were owner-occupied and 39.7% were renter-occupied. The homeowner vacancy rate was 0.9% and the rental vacancy rate was 3.2%.

=== Racial and ethnic composition ===
Sutter County, California – Racial and ethnic composition Note: the US Census treats Hispanic/Latino as an ethnic category. This table excludes Latinos from the racial categories and assigns them to a separate category. Hispanics/Latinos may be of any race.
Race / Ethnicity (NH = Non-Hispanic)	Pop 1980	Pop 1990	Pop 2000	Pop 2010	Pop 2020	% 1980	% 1990	% 2000	% 2010	% 2020
White alone (NH)	40,969	46,140	47,532	47,782	41,366	78.42%	71.63%	60.22%	50.44%	41.52%
Black or African American alone (NH)	552	987	1,418	1,713	1,774	1.06%	1.53%	1.80%	1.81%	1.78%
Native American or Alaska Native alone (NH)	587	826	940	925	862	1.12%	1.28%	1.19%	0.98%	0.87%
Asian alone (NH)	3,597	5,748	8,771	13,442	18,014	6.88%	8.92%	11.11%	14.19%	18.08%
Native Hawaiian or Pacific Islander alone (NH)	x	x	142	256	279	x	x	0.18%	0.27%	0.28%
Other race alone (NH)	443	122	190	190	611	0.85%	0.19%	0.24%	0.20%	0.61%
Mixed race or Multiracial (NH)	x	x	2,408	3,178	5,159	x	x	3.05%	3.35%	5.18%
Hispanic or Latino (any race)	6,098	10,592	17,529	27,251	31,568	11.67%	16.44%	22.21%	28.76%	31.68%
Total	52,246	64,415	78,930	94,737	99,633	100.00%	100.00%	100.00%	100.00%	100.00%

=== American Community Survey 2025 data ===
The United States Census Bureau estimated that in 2025, Sutter County’s population was 98.787. It was also estimated that the county's population was 37,70% Non-Hispanic White, 34,26% Hispanic or Latino, 1,87% Non-Hispanic Black, 19,91% Asian, 0,83% Native American, 0,33% Pacific Islander, and 5,10% Multiracial.

Total	Population	Percentage
Non-Hispanic White	37.238	37,70%
Hispanic or Latino	33.845	34,26%
Non-Hispanic Black	1.849	1,87%
Asian	19.664	19,91%
Native American	822	0,83%
Pacific Islander	329	0,33%
Non-Hispanic Multiracial	5.040	5,10%

=== 2010 census ===
The 2010 United States census reported that Sutter County had a population of 94,737. The racial makeup of Sutter County was 57,749 (61.0%) White, 1,919 (2.0%) African American, 1,365 (1.4%) Native American, 13,663 (14.4%) Asian, 281 (0.3%) Pacific Islander, 14,463 (15.3%) from other races, and 5,297 (5.6%) from two or more races. Hispanic or Latino of any race were 27,251 persons (28.8%).

Population reported at 2010 United States census
The County	Total; Population	White	African; American	Native; American	Asian	Pacific; Islander	other races	two or more races	Hispanic or Latino (of any race)
Sutter County	94,737	57,749	1,919	1,365	13,663	281	14,463	5,297	27,251
Incorporated cities	Total; Population	White	African; American	Native; American	Asian	Pacific; Islander	other races	two or more races	Hispanic or Latino (of any race)
Live Oak	8,392	4,491	138	130	978	17	2,173	465	4,093
Yuba City	64,925	37,382	1,591	909	11,190	228	9,772	3,853	18,413
Census-designated places	Total; Population	White	African; American	Native; American	Asian	Pacific; Islander	other races	two or more races	Hispanic or Latino (of any race)
East Nicolaus	225	159	0	1	19	0	41	5	49
Meridian	358	268	2	7	0	0	58	23	85
Nicolaus	211	186	1	0	5	0	10	9	13
Rio Oso	356	274	5	7	26	1	32	11	53
Robbins	323	208	0	9	5	0	94	7	181
Sutter	2,904	2,503	16	54	30	1	160	140	410
Trowbridge	226	167	3	5	25	0	15	11	38
Other unincorporated areas	Total; Population	White	African; American	Native; American	Asian	Pacific; Islander	other races	two or more races	Hispanic or Latino (of any race)
All others not CDPs (combined)	16,817	12,111	163	243	1,385	34	2,108	773	3,916

=== 2000 census ===
As of the 2000 census, there were 78,930 people, 27,033 households, and 19,950 families residing in the county. The population density was 131 inhabitants per square mile (51/km^{2}). There were 28,319 housing units at an average density of 47 per square mile (18/km^{2}). The racial makeup of the county was 67.5% White, 1.9% Black or African American, 1.6% Native American, 11.3% Asian, 0.2% Pacific Islander, 13.0% from other races, and 4.6% from two or more races. 22.2% of the population were Hispanic or Latino of any race. 10.3% were of German, 9.0% American, 7.1% English and 6.1% Irish ancestry according to Census 2000. 70.3% spoke English, 17.9% Spanish and 9.3% Punjabi as their first language.

There were 27,033 households, out of which 37.9% had children under the age of 18 living with them, 57.0% were married couples living together, 11.7% had a female householder with no husband present, and 26.2% were non-families. 21.2% of all households were made up of individuals, and 8.6% had someone living alone who was 65 years of age or older. The average household size was 2.87 and the average family size was 3.35.

In the county, the population was spread out, with 29.0% under the age of 18, 9.2% from 18 to 24, 28.2% from 25 to 44, 21.3% from 45 to 64, and 12.4% who were 65 years of age or older. The median age was 34 years. For every 100 females, there were 98.0 males. For every 100 females age 18 and over, there were 94.3 males.

The median income for a household in the county was $38,375, and the median income for a family was $44,330. Males had a median income of $35,723 versus $25,778 for females. The per capita income for the county was $17,428. About 12.1% of families and 15.5% of the population were below the poverty line, including 21.3% of those under age 18 and 7.7% of those age 65 or over.

== Media ==
Sutter County is in the Sacramento television market, and thus receives Sacramento media.

== Communities ==
=== Cities ===
- Live Oak
- Yuba City (county seat)

=== Census-designated places ===
- East Nicolaus
- Meridian
- Nicolaus
- Rio Oso
- Robbins
- Sutter
- Trowbridge

=== Unincorporated communities ===
- Encinal
- Pleasant Grove
- South Yuba City
- Tierra Buena
- Tudor

=== Proposed town ===
- Sutter Pointe

=== Population ranking ===
The population ranking of the following table is based on the 2020 census of Sutter County.

† county seat

Rank	City/Town/etc.	Municipal type	Population (2020 census)
1	† Yuba City	City	70,117
2	Live Oak	City	9,106
3	Sutter	CDP	2,997
4	Rio Oso	CDP	372
5	Robbins	CDP	347
6	Meridian	CDP	304
7	Trowbridge	CDP	229
8	East Nicolaus	CDP	223
9	Nicolaus	CDP	176

== See also ==
- Hiking trails in Sutter County
- List of school districts in Sutter County, California
- National Register of Historic Places listings in Sutter County, California
- Sutter County Library
