= Electoral history of James Gallagher =

Elections featuring James Gallagher as a candidate

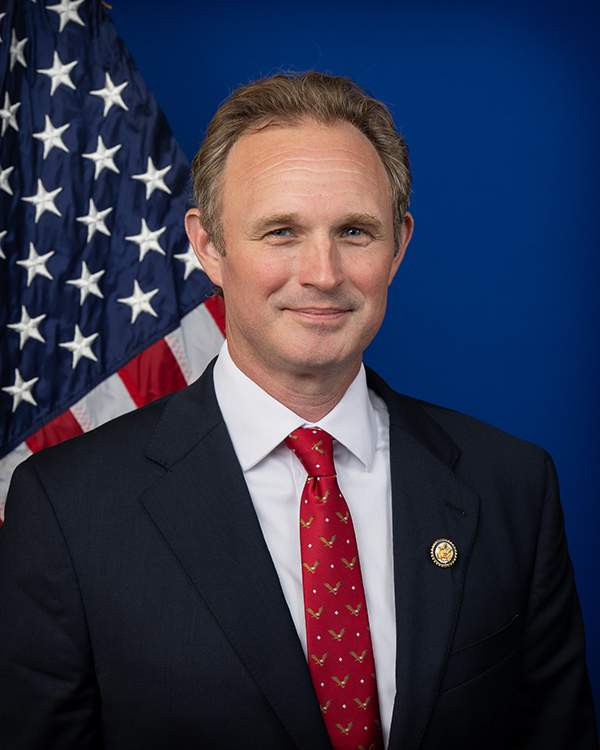
Official portrait, 2026

James Matthew Gallagher (born March 7, 1981) is an American politician who has served as the U.S. representative from California's 1st congressional district since 2026. A member of the Republican Party, he previously served in the California State Assembly from 2014 to 2026, representing the 3rd district located in the northern Sacramento Valley. Gallagher served as the Minority Leader of the California State Assembly from 2022 to 2025.

== California State Assembly ==
2014 California State Assembly 3rd district election
Primary election
Party	Candidate	Votes	%
Republican	James Gallagher	34,744	44.4
Democratic	Jim Reed	26,557	34.0
Republican	Ryan Schohr	16,906	21.6
Total votes		78,207	100.0
General election
Republican	James Gallagher	69,552	63.1
Democratic	Jim Reed	40,732	36.9
Total votes		110,284	100.0
Republican hold			

2016 California State Assembly 3rd district election
Primary election
Party	Candidate	Votes	%
Republican	James Gallagher (incumbent)	66,686	61.0
Democratic	Edward Ritchie	42,700	39.0
Democratic	Bryce Corron (write-in)	12	0.0
Total votes		109,398	100.0
General election
Republican	James Gallagher (incumbent)	108,910	63.0
Democratic	Edward Ritchie	63,867	37.0
Total votes		172,777	100.0
Republican hold			

2018 California State Assembly 3rd district election
Primary election
Party	Candidate	Votes	%
Republican	James Gallagher (incumbent)	64,975	65.0
Democratic	Sonia Aery	34,941	35.0
Total votes		99,916	100.0
General election
Republican	James Gallagher (incumbent)	95,786	60.2
Democratic	Sonia Aery	63,445	39.8
Total votes		159,231	100.0
Republican hold			

2020 California State Assembly 3rd district election
Primary election
Party	Candidate	Votes	%
Republican	James Gallagher (incumbent)	83,022	65.3
Democratic	James R. Henson	44,107	34.7
Total votes		127,129	100.0
General election
Republican	James Gallagher (incumbent)	130,163	63.7
Democratic	James R. Henson	74,201	36.3
Total votes		204,364	100.0

2022 California State Assembly 3rd district election
Primary election
Party	Candidate	Votes	%
Republican	James Gallagher (incumbent)	65,115	66.0
Democratic	David Leon Zink	33,513	34.0
Democratic	Jeanenne H. Hoston (write-in)	41	0.0
Total votes		98,669	100.0
General election
Republican	James Gallagher (incumbent)	98,475	65.4
Democratic	David Leon Zink	52,198	34.6
Total votes		150,673	100.0
Republican hold			

2024 California State Assembly 3rd district election
Primary election
Party	Candidate	Votes	%
Republican	James Gallagher (incumbent)	76,570	68.4
Democratic	Aaron Draper	35,434	31.6
Total votes		112,004	100.0
General election
Republican	James Gallagher (incumbent)	131,578	66.3
Democratic	Aaron Draper	66,962	33.7
Total votes		198,540	100.0
Republican hold			

== U.S. House of Representatives ==
2026 California's 1st congressional district special election
Party	Candidate	Votes	%
Republican	James Gallagher	123,551	62.10
Democratic	Audrey Denney	36,841	18.52
Democratic	Mike McGuire	34,319	17.25
Republican	Jot Thiara	2,423	1.22
No party preference	Richard Montgomery	1,808	0.91
Total votes		198,942	100.00
Republican hold			
