= La Malfa =

La Malfa is a surname. Notable people with the surname include:

- Giorgio La Malfa (born 1939), Italian politician
- Ugo La Malfa (1903–1979), Italian politician

== See also ==
- Alejandro Lamalfa (1947–2021), Spanish physician and politician
- Doug LaMalfa (1960–2026), American politician
