= Biggs, California =

City in California, United States

- City
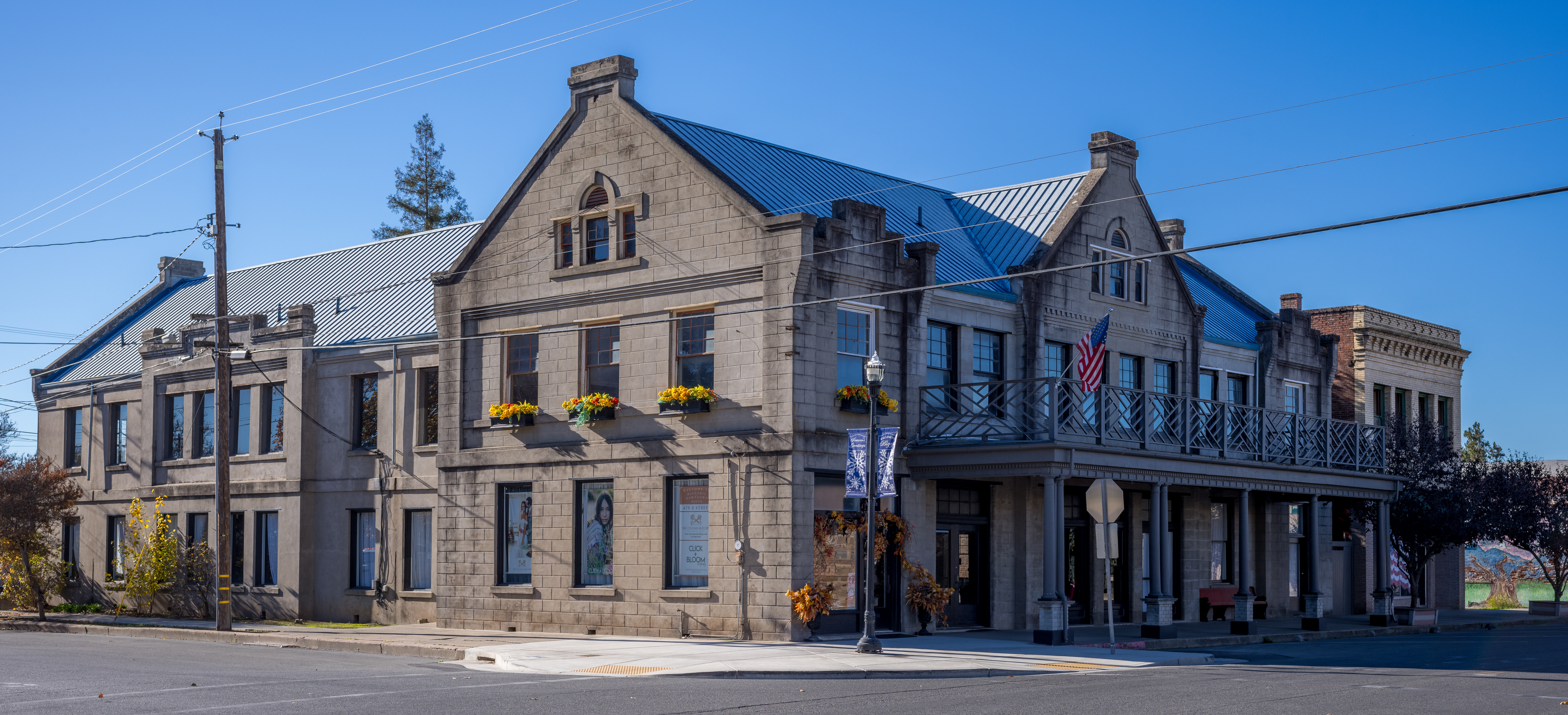
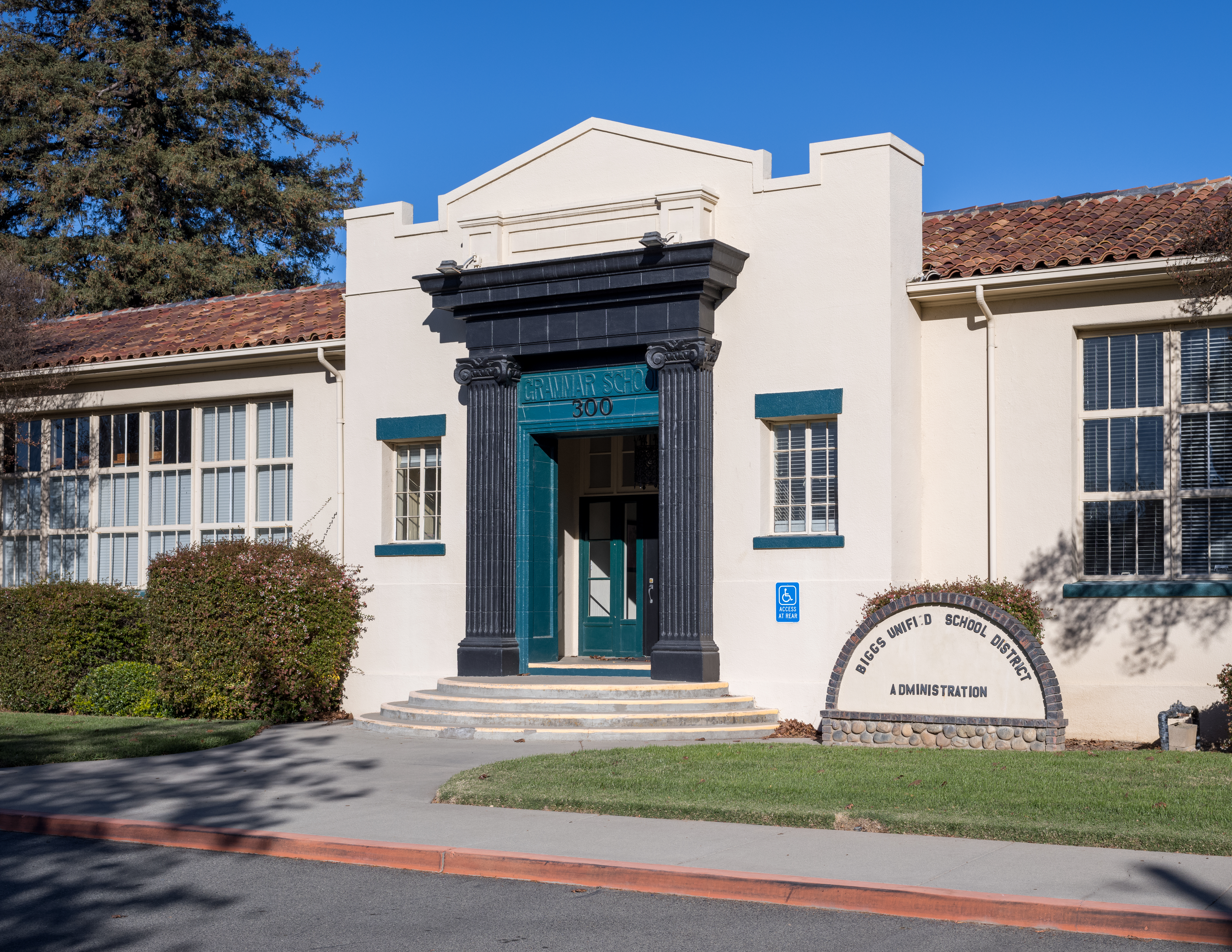
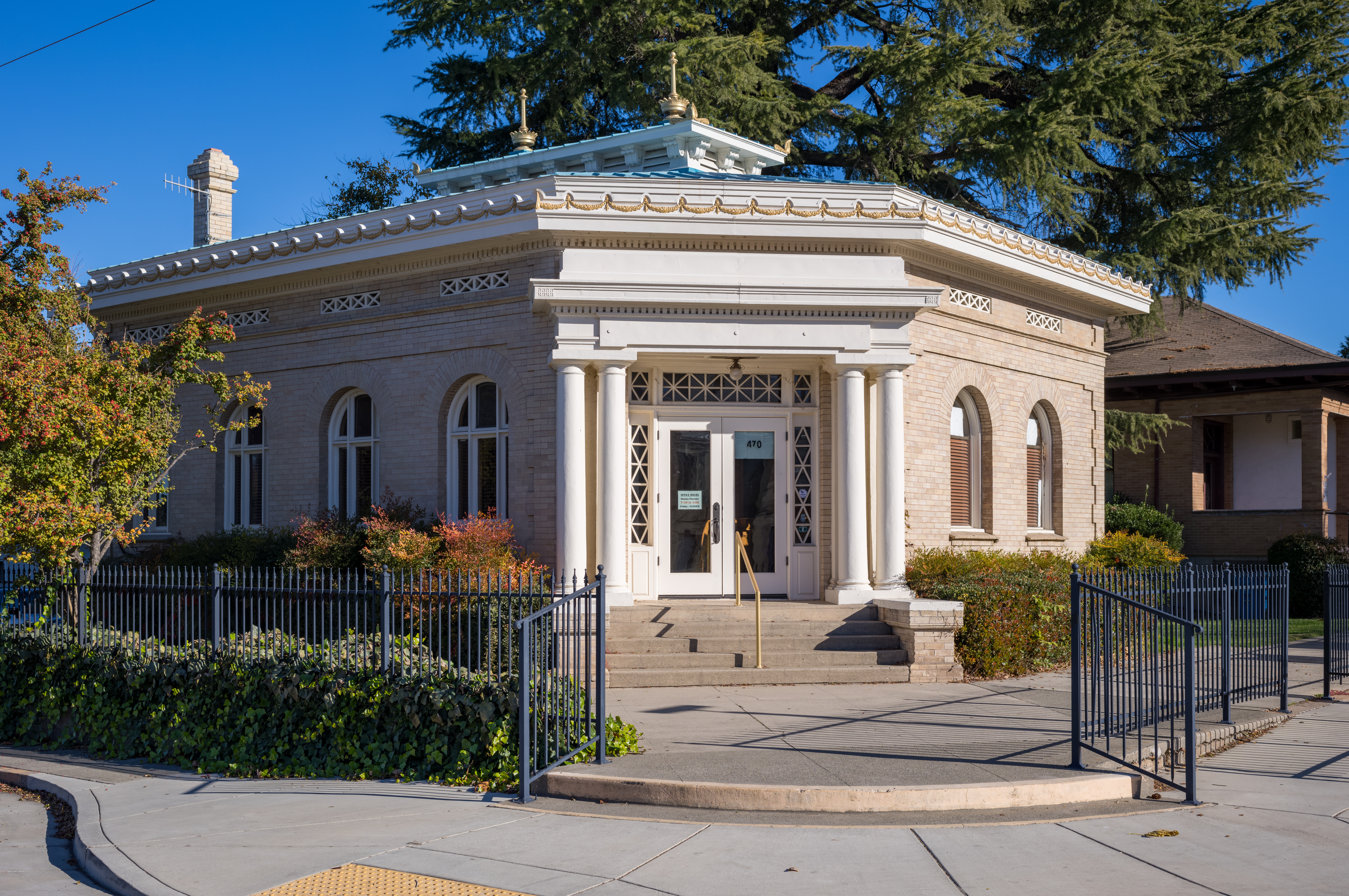

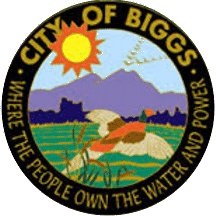
- Seal
- Nickname: "Heart of Rice Country"
- Motto: "Where The People Own The Water And Power"
- Interactive map of Biggs, California
- Location in the United States
- Coordinates: 39°24′50″N 121°42′37″W
- Country: United States
- State: California
- County: Butte
- Incorporated: June 26, 1903

Government
  - Type: Council - Manager
  - State Senator: Megan Dahle (R)
  - State Assembly: Vacant
  - U. S. Congress: James Gallagher (R)

Area
  - Total: 0.90 sq mi (2.32 km^{2})
  - Land: 0.90 sq mi (2.32 km^{2})
  - Water: 0 sq mi (0.00 km^{2}) 0%
- Elevation: 98 ft (30 m)

Population (2020)
  - Total: 1,964
  - Density: 2,195.3/sq mi (847.61/km^{2})
- Time zone: UTC-8 (PST)
  - Summer (DST): UTC-7 (PDT)
- ZIP code: 95917
- Area codes: 530, 837
- FIPS code: 06-06560
- GNIS feature IDs: 277474, 2409848
- Website: www.biggs-ca.gov

Biggs (formerly Biggs Station) is a city in Butte County, California, United States. The population was 1,964 at the 2020 census, up from 1,707 at the 2010 census.

== Geography ==
Biggs is located at 39°24′50″N 121°42′37″W (39.413820, -121.710316).

According to the United States Census Bureau, the city has a total area of 0.9 square miles (2.3 km^{2}), all land.

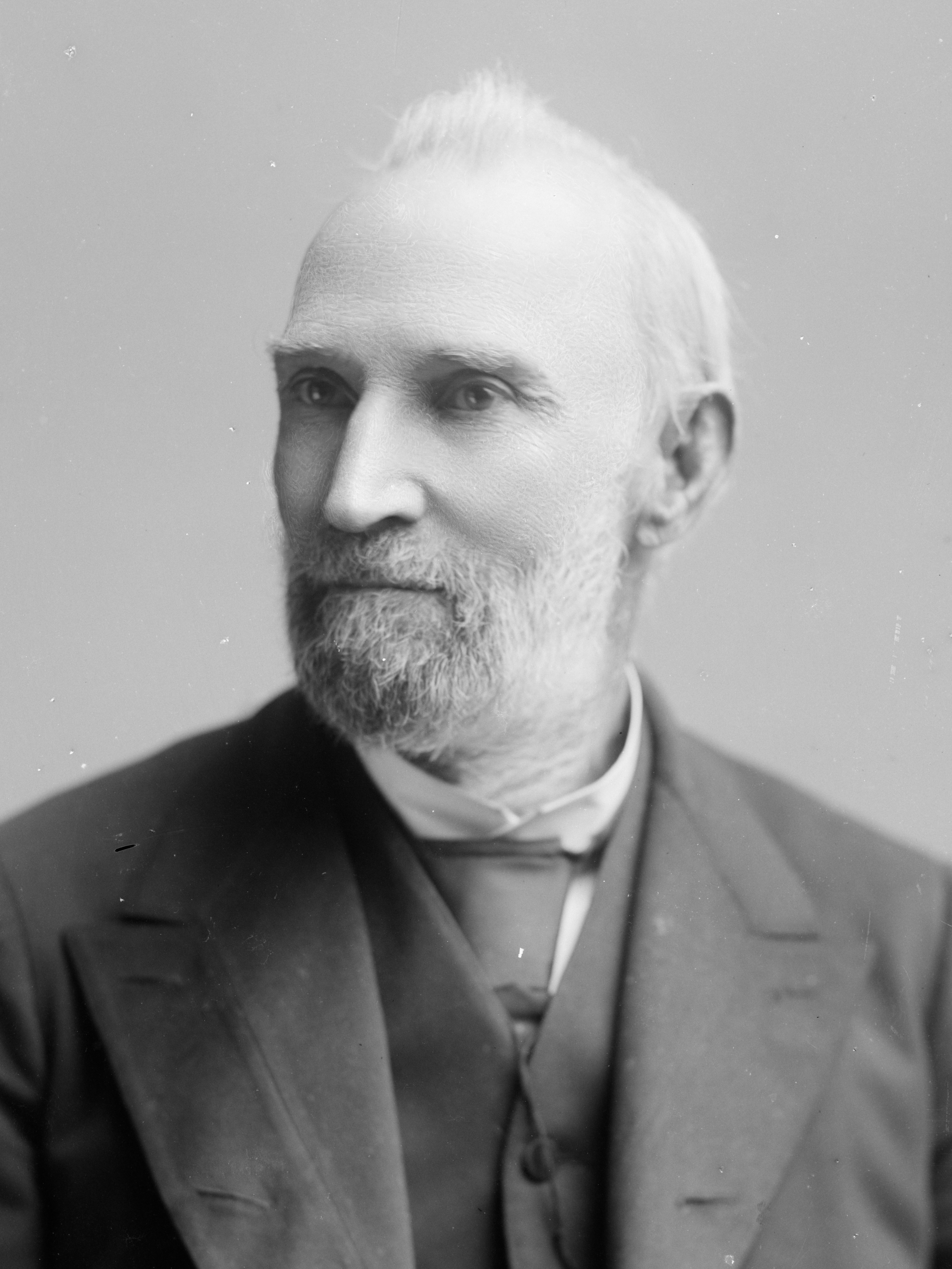
Marion Biggs, the city's namesake.

== History ==
A post office was established at Biggs Station in 1871, and the name changed to Biggs in 1884. It was incorporated in 1903. Biggs is named for Maj. Marion Biggs, who first shipped grain by rail from the town's location.

In 1877, ancestors of the scientist Linus Pauling left Missouri and travelled to California, where they lived for a time in Biggs, "a settlement composed mostly of Germans" (the ancestors in question were themselves of German descent).

In late 2002, the town's mayor received a letter from Jeff Manning, executive director of the California Milk Processor Board, proposing that the town change its name to "Got Milk?". The town council of Biggs subsequently rejected the proposal.

As of 2019, Biggs was declared a sister city to Woburn, Massachusetts by the mayor of Woburn, Ralph Grande.

== Demographics ==
Historical population
Census	Pop.	Note	%±
1880	95		—
1890	571		501.1%
1910	403		—
1920	683		69.5%
1930	463		−32.2%
1940	547		18.1%
1950	784		43.3%
1960	831		6.0%
1970	1,115		34.2%
1980	1,413		26.7%
1990	1,581		11.9%
2000	1,793		13.4%
2010	1,707		−4.8%
2020	1,964		15.1%
U.S. Decennial Census

=== 2020 census ===
As of the 2020 census, Biggs had a population of 1,964 and a population density of 2,194.4 inhabitants per square mile (847.3/km^{2}). The median age was 35.4 years; 27.6% of residents were under the age of 18, 9.0% were aged 18 to 24, 23.6% were aged 25 to 44, 25.9% were aged 45 to 64, and 13.8% were 65 years of age or older. For every 100 females, there were 96.8 males, and for every 100 females age 18 and over, there were 91.8 males age 18 and over.

The whole population lived in households. There were 642 households, of which 42.8% had children under the age of 18. Of all households, 53.6% were married-couple households, 7.3% were cohabiting couple households, 12.0% were households with a male householder and no spouse or partner present, and 27.1% were households with a female householder and no spouse or partner present. About 15.1% of all households were made up of individuals, 8.4% had someone living alone who was 65 years of age or older, and the average household size was 3.06. There were 499 families (77.7% of all households).

There were 676 housing units at an average density of 755.3 units per square mile (291.6 units/km^{2}), of which 642 (95.0%) were occupied. Of all housing units, 5.0% were vacant. The homeowner vacancy rate was 1.5% and the rental vacancy rate was 4.1%. Of occupied units, 70.6% were owner-occupied and 29.4% were renter-occupied.

0.0% of residents lived in urban areas, while 100.0% lived in rural areas.

Racial composition as of the 2020 census
Race	Number	Percent
White	1,122	57.1%
Black or African American	24	1.2%
American Indian and Alaska Native	37	1.9%
Asian	80	4.1%
Native Hawaiian and Other Pacific Islander	0	0.0%
Some other race	500	25.5%
Two or more races	201	10.2%
Hispanic or Latino (of any race)	778	39.6%

== Education ==
Biggs is within the Biggs Unified School District. The public schools in the Biggs Unified School District are Biggs Elementary School, Richvale Elementary School and Biggs High School.
