= Kristie's Law =

Kristie's Law was a proposed California law that would restrict immunity for damage (including injuries or deaths) caused by high-speed pursuits, where law enforcement agencies have established, but not followed, written pursuit policies. Kristie's Law is named for Kristina "Kristie" Marie Elena Priano a 15-year-old honor student, athlete, and community volunteer from Chico, California who died from injuries she sustained when her family's minivan was hit by a SUV that was being chased by the police.

== Background ==
On the evening of January 22, 2002, Kristie, her father, mother, and brother were in the family's minivan on the way to her high school basketball game when their car was broadsided by a Toyota RAV4. The other driver, 15 year old Jennifer Corron, was being pursued by the Chico police because she had taken her mother's car without permission. The force of the crash was enough to cause the minivan to spin around and around until it finally came to a rest on its side. Mark Priano, Kristie's father, was in a hospital's intensive-care unit for almost 48 hours with serious but non-life-threatening injuries. Kristie's mother and brother received minor physical injuries. Kristie, however, suffered massive head trauma and died six days later.

June of that year, the Prianos filed a wrongful-death lawsuit against the Cronn family and the Chico Police Department alleging that the agency was ultimately responsible for the car crash that claimed Kristie's life. The lawsuit was dismissed because according to a 1987 state law, California Vehicle Code 17004.7, "A public agency employing peace officers ...is immune from liability for civil damages for personal injury to or death of any person ...resulting from the collision of a vehicle being operated by an actual or suspected violator of the law..."

The Prianos approached California State Senator Sam Aanestad, R-Grass Valley, about changing the existing law and in early 2003 the Senator did introduce a bill but withdrew it shortly thereafter to do more research. Then in 2004, State Senator Aanestad introduced Senate Bill 1866 known as Kristie's Law to establish minimum guidelines and procedures for police vehicle pursuits that a public agency must adopt and implement, and its law enforcement officers must adhere to, as a condition of obtaining immunity from liability for injury or death caused to innocent third parties by a suspect fleeing a police vehicle pursuit. That bill was defeated. Senator Sam Aanestad re-introduced the legislation later in 2004, and then again in 2005. Each time the bill was defeated.

The Court of Appeal of the State of California, Fourth Appellate District, submitted this opinion regarding California's immunity shield that protects law enforcement agencies from accountability when officers do not follow their pursuit policy. On page 9, all of the judges concur with the following statement written by Justice J. Rylaarsdam. He wrote, "We urge the Legislature to revisit this statute and seriously reconsider the balance between public entity immunity and public safety. The balance appears to have shifted too far toward immunity and left public safety, as well as compensation for innocent victims, twisting in the wind."

== Aftermath ==
=== Senate Bill 719 ===
In 2005, Peace Officers Research Association of California (PORAC) sponsored California Senate Bill 719. "This bill would narrow the available immunity for public entities that employ peace officers when a third party is injured or killed in a collision with a person fleeing from peace officer pursuit. Such entities would be immune only if they: (1) adopted and promulgated a policy for safe conduct of motor vehicle pursuits that met minimum state standards; and (2) provided regular and periodic training for their officers regarding safe pursuits." Senate Bill 719 was authored by State Senators, Gloria Romero and Bob Margett, met no opposition from the state legislature and was signed by Governor Arnold Schwarzenegger on October 4, 2005.

=== Senate Bill 719 Detractors ===
According to State Senator Sam Aanestad's website he states: "Although I supported and voted in favor of SB 719, I do not feel this measure goes far enough and will not cut the number of pursuits in California. I will continue to track the actual numbers of police pursuits in this state, the accidents that result from these pursuits and the injuries and deaths that these pursuits cause."

"What SB 719 proposes is to slightly change the list of elements of pursuit policy -- while making no quantitative requirements," wrote the late Jim Phillips, founder of PursuitWatch.org.

Candy Priano, Kristie's mother, is founder and executive director of Voices Insisting on PursuitSAFETY, a national nonprofit public safety organization. According to its website, PursuitSAFETY is the only national nonprofit organization that exists to save the lives of innocent bystanders and police officers. PursuitSAFETY is staffed to reach out to families of law-abiding citizens impacted by the tragedy of pursuit and work with law enforcement to find safer ways to catch drivers who flee. Candy also maintains www.kristieslaw.org, a website devoted to the tragedy that claimed Kristie's life and the proposed California legislation. On the site is an ongoing list of innocent victims and police officers killed as the result of high-speed chases. She has stated that, "Because of Kristie's Law, California has received national attention about leading the nation in the number of innocent people killed in pursuits. Consequently, under the direction of law enforcement, our state legislators are now passing legislation that is simply window dressing to deceive the people of California and allows a law enforcement agency to do anything it pleases. Law enforcement has always wanted to keep the Legislature out of this issue, but with so much pressure coming because of Kristie's Law, they had to come up with another plan and that plan was putting forth meaningless legislation."
