= John H. O'Donnell =

American politician

Member of the California State Assembly from the 3rd district
- In office January 2, 1933 – January 6, 1941
- Preceded by: Jerrold L. Seawell
- Succeeded by: Lloyd W. Lowrey

Personal details
- Born: May 12, 1890 Cortland, New York, U.S.
- Died: May 9, 1968 (aged 77)
- Party: Democratic
- Children: 2

Military service
- Allegiance: United States
- Branch/service: United States Army
- Battles/wars: World War I

John H. O'Donnell (May 12, 1890 - May 9, 1968) served in the California State Assembly for the 3rd district and during World War I he served in the United States Army.
