= Cyrus H. Boynton =

American politician

Cyrus H. Boynton was an American politician. He served in the California State Assembly and represented the 3rd district.
