= John Wilburt McClellan =

American politician

John Wilburt McClellan (January 26, 1877 – July 21, 1937) was an American politician. He served in the California State Assembly and represented the 3rd district.
