= E. D. Kellogg =

American politician

E. D. Kellogg (September 21, 1820 – May 15, 1916) was an American politician. He served in the California State Assembly and represented the 3rd district.
