= Presidential Tax Transparency and Accountability Act =

State law of California

California State Legislature
- Full name: An act to add Chapter 7 (commencing with Section 6880) to Part 1 of Division 6 of, and to add Part 5 (commencing with Section 8900) to Division 8 of, the Elections Code, relating to elections, and declaring the urgency thereof, to take effect immediately.
- Introduced: December 3, 2018
- Assembly voted: 57-17
- Senate voted: 29-10
- Signed into law: July 30, 2019
- Sponsor(s): Mike McGuire and Scott Wiener
- Governor: Gavin Newsom
- Code: Elections
- Website: leginfo.legislature.ca.gov/..

Status: Partially struck down

California Senate Bill 27 (SB 27), also known as the Presidential Tax Transparency and Accountability Act, is a California law that requires candidates running for either President of the United States or Governor of California to publicly release their tax return of the previous five years in order to be listed on the primary ballot. The law does not place the requirement to publicly release tax returns on candidates running as write-in candidates.

The law's requirements for presidential candidates were invalidated by the courts. The law was first applied in the 2021 gubernatorial recall election, but a judge ruled that application invalid, halting the Secretary of State's application of the law to the recall election.

The 2022 gubernatorial election was the first election for which the law fully applied.

== History ==
The bill, authored by senators Mike McGuire and Scott Wiener, passed the two chambers of the state legislature with no Republican support and was signed into law by governor Gavin Newsom on July 30, 2019.

A similar bill was vetoed in 2017 by governor Jerry Brown. In vetoing the bill, Brown cited the slippery-slope argument as well as his concern that the law would be struck down by the courts as unconstitutional. Prominent legal scholar and UC Berkeley School of Law dean Erwin Chemerinsky argued Senate Bill 27 was lawful under the United States constitution.

=== Invalidation for presidential candidates ===
Within a week of the bill being signed into law, it was challenged in court. The Trump re-election campaign, the California Republican Party, and Judicial Watch all filed lawsuits challenging the constitutionality of the law. The suit by Judicial Watch was on behalf of four California voters.

On September 19, 2019, U.S. District Judge Morrison England issued a temporary injunction against enforcement of the law with a promise for a final ruling by the end of the month. In issuing the injunction, the judge made reference to the Ethics in Government Act as preempting the law under consideration. After the ruling, the state attorney general filed an appeal with the 9th Court of Appeals without requesting a stay of execution, meaning that the law would not apply to the presidential primaries in March 2020.

On November 21, 2019, the California Supreme Court unanimously determined the law violated the California Constitution and that Donald Trump must be allowed to appear on the March 2020 primary ballot. Chief Justice Tani Cantil-Sakauye delivered the 7–0 decision.

=== Invalidation for 2021 gubernatorial recall election ===
Although the court ruling invalidated the law for presidential candidates, it left intact the requirement for gubernatorial candidates to make their tax returns public. The first attempt to apply the law to gubernatorial candidates was in the 2021 gubernatorial recall election of Gavin Newsom. California secretary of state Shirley Weber applied the law to the recall election (the law does not specifically include recall elections, and uses the language of a "primary ballot").

After the close of the filing deadline, one candidate, Larry Elder, sued after Weber disqualified his candidacy due to purported errors in his submitted documents, saying the law required her to allow for the correction of those errors, and that the tax disclosure requirement in SB 27 did not even apply to recall elections. Sacramento County Superior Court Judge Laurie Earl agreed, saying Elder had been improperly disqualified and invalidated application of the law to recall elections; by that time, the tax returns for over 40 replacement candidates had already been made public by Weber's office. Weber's office said it would comply with the ruling and did not appeal.

Since the law was invalidated by Judge Earl for recall elections only after the close of filing, the law was cited as one reason for the major reduction in recall replacement candidates relative to the number of candidates in the 2003 gubernatorial recall.
