= Gustavus Adolphus Jasper =

American politician

Gustavus Adolphus Jasper (June 18, 1867 – December 1918) was an American politician. He served in the California State Assembly and represented the 3rd district.
