= Rick Keene =

American politician from California

Richard J. Keene

Member of the California State Assembly from the 3rd district
- In office December 2, 2002 – November 30, 2008
- Preceded by: Sam Aanestad
- Succeeded by: Dan Logue

Mayor of Chico, California
- In office May 20, 1997 – December 1998
- Preceded by: Michael McGinnis
- Succeeded by: Steve Bertagna

Personal details
- Born: November 16, 1957 (age 68) Crescent City, California
- Spouse: Janice
- Children: Erin, Christopher, Rosie, Caitlin and Lucy
- Education: California State University, Chico (B.A., 1982; Religious Studies, Psychology); Cal Northern School of Law (J.D., 1989)
- Profession: lawyer
- Website: http://www.keene.consulting

Richard J. "Rick" Keene (born November 16, 1957) is a former Republican member of the California State Assembly representing the 3rd district from 2002 to 2008. Keene previously served on the Chico, California City Council from 1994 to 2002, including a term as mayor from 1997 to 1998.

== Early life and family ==
Keene was born in Crescent City and raised in Hayfork, a small community in Trinity County. He is the son of a logger. He worked in many varied vocations in his youth. He set chokers in a logging operation, drove a forklift at a nut processing plant and, for 10 years, worked at United Parcel Service.

He began practicing law in Chico at a general law practice specializing in criminal defense, workers' compensation, and personal injury law.

== Political career ==
=== Chico City Council ===
Keene was first elected to the Chico City Council in 1994.

He served on the Internal Affairs Committee, Butte County Association of Governments and the Local Agency Formation Commission.

In 1996, his fellow Councilmember Ted Hubert died after re-election, but prior to the first meeting of the new session. This left the council evenly split 3 to 3 between progressive and conservative members. They stalemated on the selection of a mayor for six months before finally appointing Bill Johnston to fill the vacancy, and selecting Keene as mayor.

=== California Assembly ===
Keene was elected to the State Assembly in 2002. He represented the 3rd District including Lassen, Plumas, Yuba, Nevada, Sierra and portions of Butte and Placer Counties for six years. In his second term in the Assembly, Keene assumed several leadership positions, including being selected as Republican Whip and the Vice Chair of the Committee on Water, Parks and Wildlife.

Chosen as Assistant Republican Leader 10 months after being first elected, Keene served as principal consultant to three successive Republican Leaders on major policy issues and political strategy.

He was also selected to be lead Republican and Vice Chair on the Budget and Utility and Commerce Committees and also served on the Natural Resources Committee, the Joint Legislative Committee on Emergency Services and Homeland Security, and the Joint Legislative Audit Committee, the legislature's watchdog committee.

While in the Assembly, he focused much of his time and effort on the State Budget, Workers' Compensation Reform and addressing the State's infrastructure, including working to prevent failing levees in the North State and negotiating to construct new water storage.

=== 4th District Senate Election of 2010 ===
Keene was a candidate for the California State Senate 4th District in 2010. Incumbent Sam Aanestad was term-limited. Former 4th District senator Sam Aanestad, former senators Rico Oller and Tim Leslie and Congressman Tom McClintock endorsed Keene's candidacy. On June 8, 2010 Doug LaMalfa defeated him in the primary.

== Post political career ==
After serving in the legislature in 2009, Keene joined the Sacramento law firm of Wilke Fleury as "Of Counsel."

In the summer of 2010 he created a business, called Keene Consulting.

In 2012 he was hired in house by SAS Institute to assist them with business development within the State of California.

In 2015 he restarted Keene Consulting as a senior strategic advisor, assisting various IT technologies with matching their capabilities with State priorities and needs and helping State entities navigate the states procurement, funding and approval processes, which he still does currently.

Preceded by Michael McGinnis	Mayor of Chico, California; May 20, 1997–December 1998	Succeeded by Steve Bertagna
Preceded by Sam Aanestad	Member of the California State Assembly from the 3rd district 2002–2008	Succeeded by Dan Logue
