= Alejandro Lamalfa =

Spanish politician (died 2021)

Alejandro Lamalfa Díaz

Mayor of Barruelo de Santullán
- In office 1990–2007
- In office 2011–2015

Member of the Senate of Spain
- In office 1996–2000

Personal details
- Born: 1947 Santoña, Cantabria, Spain
- Died: August 18, 2021 (aged 73–74) Maliaño, Cantabria, Spain
- Party: People's Party
- Occupation: Physician

Alejandro Lamalfa Díaz (1947 – 18 August 2021) was a Spanish physician and politician. He served as mayor of Barruelo de Santullán for more than twenty years (1990–2007; 2011–2015), and was a senator in the Senate of Spain from 1996 to 2000.

== Biography ==
Lamalfa was born in Santoña, Cantabria. He studied medicine at the University of Valladolid and began his medical career in Casarejos (Province of Soria), where he worked for six years before moving to Barruelo de Santullán. He practised as a physician there for 32 years until his retirement in 2013.

From 1996 to 2000 he served as a senator for the People's Party in the VI legislature, taking part in several committees, including the Special Committee on the Study of Euthanasia, the Committee on Ibero-American Affairs, the Committee on Performing Arts, Music and Audiovisual Social Affairs, and the Special Committee on Genetic Manipulation for Food Production.

He was mayor of Barruelo de Santullán during two periods (1990–2007 and 2011–2015).

He was married to María del Carmen Gil La Red and had three children: Mercedes, Eva María and Alejandro.
