= Lloyd W. Lowrey =

American politician

Member of the California State Assembly from the 3rd district
- In office January 6, 1941 – January 7, 1963
- Preceded by: John H. O'Donnell
- Succeeded by: Leroy F. Greene

Personal details
- Born: December 7, 1903 Rumsey, California, U.S.
- Died: March 13, 1992 (aged 88) Rumsey, California, U.S.
- Party: Democratic
- Spouse: Helen Frances (after 1945)
- Children: 3
- Education: University of California, Berkeley

Military service
- Branch/service: California State Guard
- Battles/wars: World War II

Lloyd W. Lowrey (December 7, 1903 – March 13, 1992) represented the California's 3rd State Assembly district from 1941 to 1963. He ran unopposed for 8 of his 11 campaigns for office.

Lowrey was born in Rumsey, California. He married Helen Frances on November 3, 1945. They had three sons: Lloyd Jr., who was an attorney specializing in environmental and water rights issues, Jan Thomas, who followed his father into politics and ran the family ranch in Rumsey, and Timothy T. Lowrey, a botanist at University of New Mexico.
