= C. C. McCray =

American politician

Charles Carroll McCray (April 28, 1861 – March 9, 1939) was an American politician. He served in the California State Assembly and represented the 3rd district.
