= Darlington Jeffries Johnson =

American politician

Darlington Jeffries Johnson was an American politician. He served in the California State Assembly and represented the 3rd district.
