= E. D. Damon =

American politician

E. D. Damon was an American politician. He served in the California State Assembly and represented the 3rd district.
