= Mike McGuire (politician) =

American politician (born 1979)

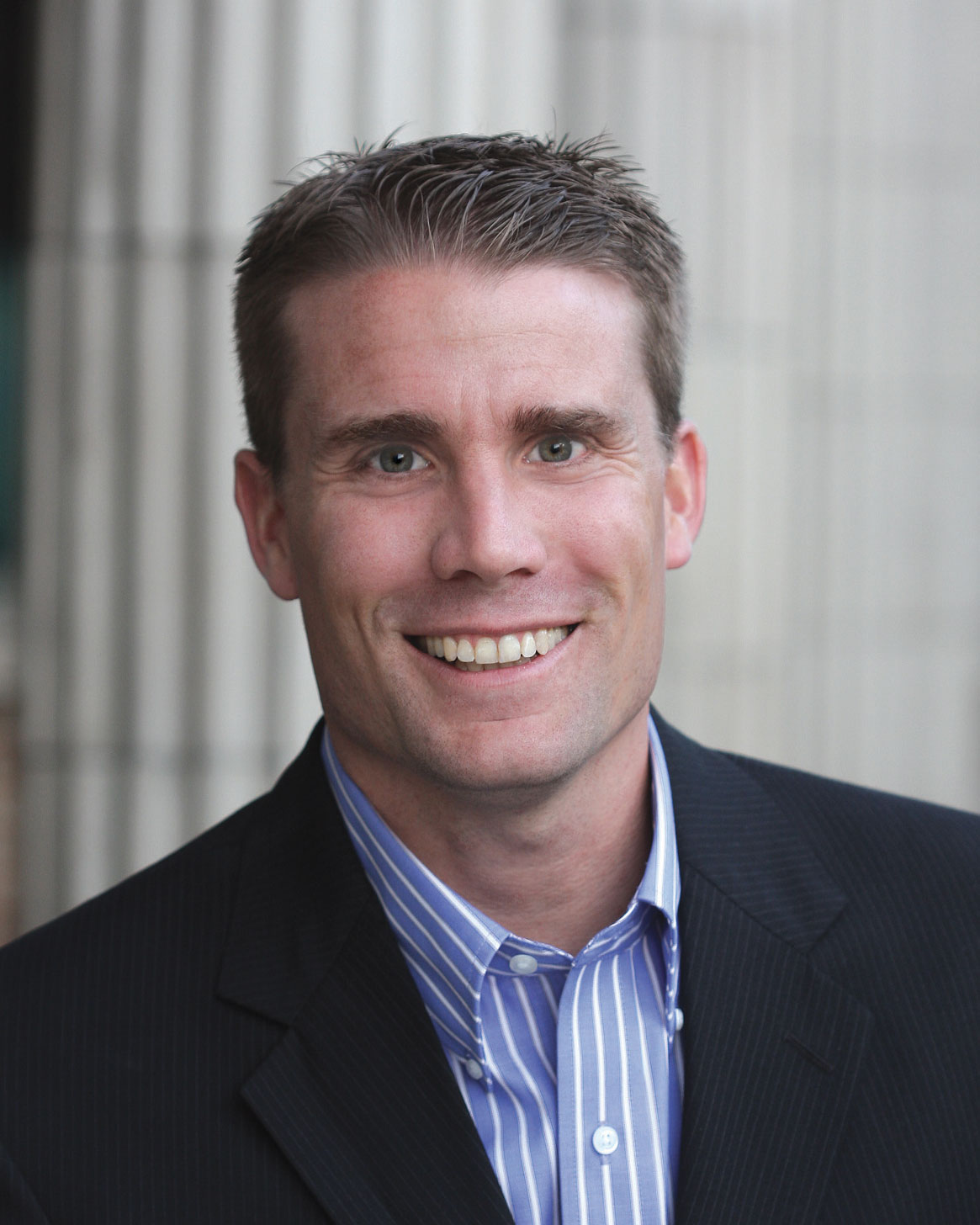
- Official portrait, 2017

Member-elect of the U.S. House of Representatives from California's 1st district
- Assuming office January 3, 2027
- Succeeding: James Gallagher

President pro tempore of the California State Senate
- In office February 5, 2024 – November 17, 2025
- Preceded by: Toni Atkins
- Succeeded by: Monique Limón

Majority Leader of the California Senate
- In office January 19, 2022 – February 5, 2024
- Preceded by: Robert Hertzberg
- Succeeded by: Lena Gonzalez

Member of the California Senate from the 2nd district
- Incumbent
- Assumed office December 1, 2014
- Preceded by: Noreen Evans

Member of the Sonoma County Board of Supervisors from the 4th district
- In office 2011–2014
- Preceded by: Paul Kelley
- Succeeded by: James Gore

Personal details
- Born: July 7, 1979 (age 47) Healdsburg, California, U.S.
- Party: Democratic
- Spouse: Erika Fremault
- Children: 1
- Education: Sonoma State University (BA)
- Website: Campaign website

Michael S. McGuire (born July 7, 1979) is an American politician who is the U.S. Representative-elect for California's 1st congressional district. He has been a Democratic member of the California State Senate representing the 2nd district since 2014, where he served as majority leader from 2022 to 2024 and senate president pro tempore from 2024 to 2025. His district encompasses the North Coast region, from Marin County to Del Norte County.

McGuire served as assistant majority leader from 2018 until he succeeded Robert Hertzberg as majority leader in 2022. Prior to being elected to the state senate in 2014, he was a member of the Sonoma County Board of Supervisors and served as mayor of Healdsburg. By August 2023, he began fundraising to run for State Insurance Commissioner in 2026. By November 2025, McGuire changed course and announced that he would instead run for Congress in the newly redrawn 1st district. He had also run in the special election for the same district in 2026 with the existing boundaries but had lost to Republican James Gallagher by a wide margin.

== Early life, education, and career ==
Mike McGuire comes from a family of farmers, specializing in grape and prune farming for over 50 years. In 1998, he became the youngest person ever elected to the Healdsburg School Board at age 19. He attended Sonoma State University in Rohnert Park, California, receiving a Bachelor of Arts in political science in 2002.

McGuire first held elected office at 19 in 1998 when he was elected to the Healdsburg School Board. In 2004, he was elected to the Healdsburg City Council, where he spent six years, including time as the city's youngest mayor. In 2010, he became a member of the Sonoma County Board of Supervisors.

== California State Senate ==
In 2014, McGuire ran for the California State Senate to succeed Democratic senator Noreen Evans, who decided not to seek reelection. McGuire easily defeated Republican candidate Lawrence Weisner for the District 2 State Senate seat that year, winning 70% of the vote.

In April 2015, he introduced bill SB 643, with the purpose of legalizing and regulating the medical marijuana industry. The regulation would cover cultivation to consumption. McGuire criticized the state's lack of rules and regulations for medical marijuana, and was opposed to the Adult Use of Marijuana Act (Proposition 64). In September 2017, he was part of the state's legislative session that urged Congress to censure the president Donald Trump.

In September 2018, the bill he introduced to establish a statewide protocol for emergency alerts for all 58 California counties was signed into a law. In December 2018, he was selected to serve as assistant majority leader of the California Senate. In early January 2019, McGuire "applauded" Governor Gavin Newsom's 2019 budget plan for California. That same month, when President Donald Trump threatened to withhold government emergency fundings for the wildfires because of poor forest management by the state of California, McGuire replied in a tweet that most California forests affected are managed by the federal government and not the state.

In 2019, he co-authored California Senate Bill 27 (SB27) officially named Tax Transparency Bill which was signed into law by Newsom on July 30, 2019. He authored a bill that established the Great Redwood Trail as a proposed rail-to-trail project in Northern California.

McGuire was announced as the incoming State Senate President Pro-Tempore on August 28, 2023. He assumed the position on February 5, 2024.

As President pro tempore of the California State Senate, McGuire selected Sen. María Elena Durazo to lead the Senate Local Government Committee and Aisha Wahab to lead the Senate Housing Committee. Both Durazo and Wahab used their chairmanship to seek to block the passage of California state legislation to allow apartment buildings near major transportation hubs in California, amid a major housing shortage.

== Candidacy for U.S. House ==
In 2026, McGuire ran for the open seat for California's 1st congressional district in the United States House of Representatives made vacant after the death of Doug LaMalfa. He was defeated by Republican State Assemblyman James Gallagher in the special election for the LaMalfa's remaining term. The special election also coincided with the primary election under the new district boundaries following the passage of Proposition 50. In this election, both Gallagher and McGuire advanced, setting up a rematch in the November general election in which McGuire is favored as the Democratic nominee.

In the 2026 November general election, McGuire defeated incumbent James Gallagher following redistricting.

== Electoral history ==
=== Healdsburg City Council ===
2004 Healdsburg City Council election
Party	Candidate	Votes	%
Nonpartisan	Mike McGuire	3,894	30.3
Nonpartisan	Gary W. Plass	2,821	22.0
Nonpartisan	Lisa W. Schaffner	2,746	21.4
Nonpartisan	Mark T. Gleason	2,462	19.2
Nonpartisan	Tod Brilliant	928	7.2
Total votes		12,851	100.0

2008 Healdsburg City Council Election
Party	Candidate	Votes	%
Nonpartisan	Mike McGuire	4,437	35.6
Nonpartisan	Tom Chambers	3,031	24.3
Nonpartisan	Gary W. Plass	2,928	23.5
Nonpartisan	Tony Pastene	2,053	16.5
Total votes		12,449	100.0

=== Sonoma County Board of Supervisors ===
2010 Sonoma County Board of Supervisors 4th district election
Party	Candidate	Votes	%
Nonpartisan	Mike McGuire	15,043	61.8
Nonpartisan	Debora Fudge	9,210	37.8
Write-in		103	0.4
Total votes		24,356	100.0

=== California State Senate ===
2014 California State Senate 2nd district election
Primary election
Party	Candidate	Votes	%
Democratic	Mike McGuire	104,670	57.9
Republican	Lawrence R. Wiesner	48,401	26.8
Democratic	Derek Knell	19,733	10.9
No party preference	Harry V. Lehmann	8,060	4.5
Total votes		180,864	100.0
General election
Democratic	Mike McGuire	188,142	70.0
Republican	Lawrence R. Wiesner	80,778	30.0
Total votes		268,920	100.0
Democratic hold			

2018 California State Senate 2nd district election
Primary election
Party	Candidate	Votes	%
Democratic	Mike McGuire (incumbent)	163,723	76.2
Democratic	Veronica "Roni" Jacobi	51,186	23.8
Total votes		214,909	100.0
General election
Democratic	Mike McGuire (incumbent)	233,688	67.2
Democratic	Veronica "Roni" Jacobi	114,184	32.8
Total votes		347,872	100.0
Democratic hold			

2022 California State Senate 2nd district election
Primary election
Party	Candidate	Votes	%
Democratic	Mike McGuire (incumbent)	197,999	75.1
Republican	Gene Yoon	65,762	24.9
Total votes		263,761	100.0
General election
Democratic	Mike McGuire (incumbent)	283,689	73.3
Republican	Gene Yoon	103,333	26.7
Total votes		387,022	100.0
Democratic hold			

=== US House of Representatives ===
2026 California's 1st congressional district special election
Party	Candidate	Votes	%
Republican	James Gallagher	123,551	62.10
Democratic	Audrey Denney	36,841	18.52
Democratic	Mike McGuire	34,319	17.25
Republican	Jot Thiara	2,423	1.22
No party preference	Richard Montgomery	1,808	0.91
Total votes		198,942	100.00
Republican hold			

2026 United States House of Representatives 1st district election
Primary election
Party	Candidate	Votes	%
Republican	James Gallagher (incumbent)	92,975	42.15
Democratic	Mike McGuire	92,121	41.76
Democratic	Audrey Denney	31,378	14.22
Democratic	Janice Karman	1,697	0.77
No party preference	Timothy Sean Kelly	1,640	0.74
No party preference	Richard Minner	784	0.36
Total votes		220,595	100.0
General election
Republican	James Gallagher (incumbent)		
Democratic	Mike McGuire		
Total votes			
hold			

California Senate
Preceded by Robert Hertzberg	Majority Leader of the California Senate; 2022–2024	Succeeded by Lena Gonzalez
Preceded by Toni Atkins	President pro tempore of the California State Senate; 2024–2025	Succeeded by Monique Limón
U.S. House of Representatives
Preceded by James Gallagher	Member of the U.S. House of Representatives from California's 1st congressional district Taking office 2027	Elect
