= Charles William White (California politician) =

American politician

Charles William White (August 30, 1886 – February 26, 1969) was an American politician. He served in the California State Assembly and represented the 3rd district.
