= Biggs High School =

Location
- 300 B Street; Biggs, California 95917; United States
- Coordinates: 39.415263°N 121.702541°W

Information
- School type: Comprehensive public high school
- Status: Operating
- School district: Biggs Unified School District
- Superintendent: Doug Kaelin
- CEEB code: 050335
- NCES School ID: 060504000486
- Principal: Doug Kaelin
- Teaching staff: 12.97 (FTE)
- Grades: 9–12
- Gender: Coeducational
- Enrollment: 177 (2023-2024)
- Student to teacher ratio: 13.65
- Campus type: Suburban
- Colors: Green and white
- Mascot: Wolverine
- Website: School website

Biggs High School is a public high school in Biggs, California, United States, a city north of Sacramento and south of Redding.

== Enrollment ==
Biggs High School enrolled about 175 students in the 2010–2011 school year.

The school was very integrated in the school year of 2011–2012, with 2.4% of the student body being American Indian/Alaska Native, 1.2% Asian, 47% Hispanic, and 48.8% White.

== Athletics ==
Biggs High School offers nine sport teams, including baseball/softball, basketball, football, wrestling, volleyball, track, soccer, dance, and cheerleading.

== Notable alumni ==
- Doug LaMalfa, politician and businessman
