= Albert Frederick Ross Jr. =

American politician

Albert Frederick Ross Jr. (November 1, 1894 – October 15, 1974) was an American politician. He served in the California State Assembly, representing the 2nd district and the 3rd district. He was a Republican.
