= Dan Logue =

American politician (1950–2021)

Daniel Logue
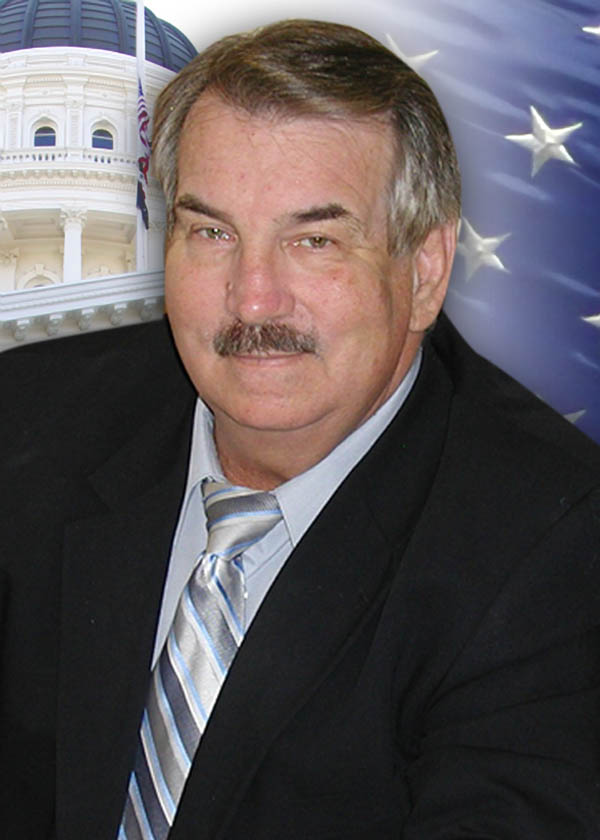

Member of the California State Assembly from the 3rd district
- In office December 1, 2008 – November 30, 2014
- Preceded by: Rick Keene
- Succeeded by: James Gallagher

Member of the Yuba County Board of Supervisors from the 1st District
- In office December 2, 2002 – December 1, 2008
- Preceded by: Al Amaro
- Succeeded by: Andy Vasquez

Personal details
- Born: Daniel Russell Logue; September 2, 1950 San Francisco, California, U.S.
- Died: July 22, 2021 (aged 70) Marysville, California, U.S.
- Party: Republican
- Spouse: Peggy Boyd Holden
- Children: Cheni Logue
- Education: Yuba College; Chico State University
- Occupation: Politician

Daniel Russell Logue (September 2, 1950 – July 22, 2021) was a Republican assemblyman who represented California's 3rd State Assembly district. He was first elected in November 2008. Prior to serving in the Assembly, Logue served as a Yuba County Supervisor.

== Early life, education, and early political career ==
Logue obtained his A.A. from Yuba College and a B.A. in government from Chico State University. He also graduated from the Oklahoma Military Academy.

Logue was elected twice to the Yuba County Board of Supervisors. He also owned his own realty firm which was Logue Realty. Logue was the Yolo County Chairman for Ronald Reagan's 1980 Campaign and the Yuba County chairman for George W. Bush's 2004 Campaign, and Arnold Schwarzenegger's 2006 gubernatorial campaign. He was also the founder of the Flood Control of Yuba- Sutter Political Action Committee. Furthermore, he was a member of the Yuba County Republican Party Executive Committee and a member of the California Republican Party State Central Committee.

== California Assembly ==
=== Elections ===
In the 2008 Republican primary election, he defeated Nevada County Supervisor Sue Horne 53%-47%. Logue defeated labor union official Mickey Harrington 56%-44%. In 2010, he won re-election to a second term by defeating Harrington in a rematch, 54%-37% as well as Libertarian candidate Gary Bryant 9%. In 2012, he won re-election to a third term by defeating Democrat Charles Rouse 56%-44%.

=== Tenure ===
In the California Assembly, Logue served as the Chief Whip for the Republican Caucus and was responsible for coordinating voting and managing messaging for the Republican Caucus. Assemblyman Logue was appointed chair of the Caucus Task Force on Jobs and Economic Recovery.

Logue organized the Economic Recovery Group, which meets regularly with business representatives from all sectors of California's economy to discuss ways to eliminate impediments and restrictive government regulations in order to improve our state's business climate. He had conducted public hearings to listen to the concerns of business owners. He held the first out-of-state hearing when he took fellow legislators to Reno, Nevada, to hear from businesses their reasons for leaving California.

The National Federation of Independent Business awarded Logue a perfect score based on his voting record and support of small business. When Texas Governor Rick Perry came to California to try to lure jobs, Logue said, "Governor Perry's message was clear to the entire delegation when he said: 'You can not be for jobs and against business – it just doesn't work.' And he's right."

Logue led the charge to organize a local veterans Memorial Committee that raised over $350,000 in private funds to construct two Veterans Memorials in the Yuba-Sutter area.

In the 2012 Election, Logue's Republican opponent, Bob Williams, sent out a news release alleging the Marysville address Logue declared as his home was the same as "Dirty Blondes Cleaning Service," a Yuba County cleaning company. Williams, a Tehama County supervisor, included in the news release a link to a website that showed the cleaning service's address was the same as the one Logue registered with the Yuba County Elections Office. The Yuba County Assessor's Office clarified the Marysville property was owned by a Walnut Grove couple and not by Dan Logue. During that same time, Logue changed his Facebook page to reflect his home being in Chico, California. Logue responded by saying, "I have 10 houses in the 3rd Assembly District, so I am just going to pick one of the houses that I already own and we will be residing there."

=== Committee assignments ===
- Total Budget
- Elections and Redistricting
- Health Committee (Vice Chair)
- Transportation

== 2014 congressional election ==
In June 2013, Logue announced he would challenge Democratic U.S. Congressman John Garamendi for California's 3rd congressional district. Garamendi won narrowly with 52.7% of the vote versus Logue's 47.3%.

== Death ==
On July 22, 2021, Logue died from Parkinson's disease.
