= J. F. McGowan =

American politician

J. F. McGowan was an American politician. A member of the Republican Party, he served in the California State Assembly and represented the 3rd district.
