= 2026 California's 1st congressional district special election =

- June 2, 2026

California's 1st congressional district
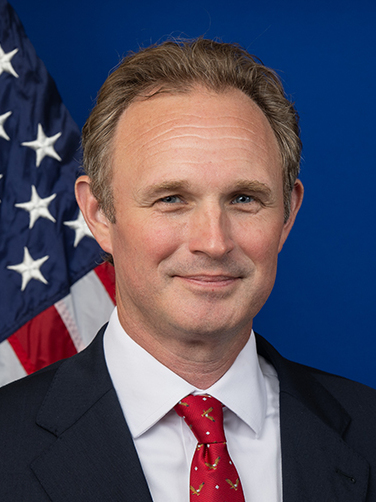

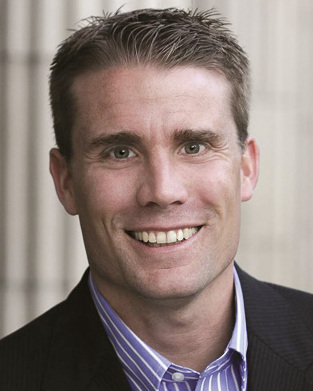
Candidate	James Gallagher	Audrey Denney	Mike McGuire
Party	Republican	Democratic	Democratic
Popular vote	123,551	36,841	34,319
Percentage	62.10%	18.52%	17.25%
- County results Gallagher: 50–60% 60–70% 70–80%
U.S. Representative before election
Doug LaMalfa
Republican
Elected U.S. Representative
James Gallagher
Republican

The 2026 California's 1st congressional district special election for California's 1st congressional district in the United States House of Representatives was held on June 2, 2026, to fill the vacancy created by the death of incumbent Republican U.S. representative Doug LaMalfa. A runoff between the top two candidates would have been held on August 4 if no candidate received a majority of the vote.

Although the election occurred after the passage of Proposition 50 in 2025, the proposition did not impact this election because the proposed map goes into effect for the term that begins on January 3, 2027, as the special election was for the term that expires on that date.

Republican state assemblyman James Gallagher won the election in this heavily red district by securing 62.10% of the total votes and defeating Democratic candidates Audrey Denney and Mike McGuire by a massive margin. The special election also coincided with the primary election for the new district boundaries, in which Gallagher and McGuire both advanced, setting up a rematch in the November general election.

== Background ==
=== Redistricting and scheduling ===
In 2025, California voters passed Proposition 50, an amendment to California's constitution that supplanted the map created by the California Citizens Redistricting Commission (CCRC) with a map that favors Democratic candidates. As a result, District 1 was redrawn to be more Democratic-leaning, removing the Republican-leaning rural counties of Modoc and Siskiyou along with the Redding and Yuba–Sutter metropolitan areas, while adding the Democratic-leaning city of Santa Rosa. In the 2024 presidential election, the newly redrawn 1st district would have voted for Kamala Harris by a margin of 54.5 to 42.3. Doug LaMalfa intended to seek reelection to the 1st district despite the new map before his death.

The congressional map drawn by Proposition 50 became official following the state's primary on June 2. As the primary for the special election was also held on June 2, the general special election used the current map drawn by the CCRC. A run-off for the general special election would have occurred on August 4 if no candidate received a majority of votes in the primary. Although most special elections use old district lines before a redistricting cycle, some previous elections have used newly drawn maps, including a special election for Nebraska's 1st district in 2022.

=== Republican control of the House ===
LaMalfa died one day after the resignation of Republican Marjorie Taylor Greene, bringing the total Republicans in the House of Representatives to a bare majority of 218 to 213 Democrats with four vacancies at the time. News organizations, including The Wall Street Journal and Politico, noted that this narrow margin provided additional strain on the Republican majority and Speaker Mike Johnson, as the Republicans could only lose two votes, placing increased prominence on the special election.

== Candidates ==
=== Declared ===
- Audrey Denney (Democratic), nonprofit consultant and food security activist; runner-up for this seat in 2018 and 2020
- James Gallagher (Republican), former Minority Leader of the California Assembly (2022–2025) from the 3rd district (2014–2026)
- Mike McGuire (Democratic), former president pro tempore of the California State Senate (2024–2025) from the 2nd district (2014–present)
- Richard Montgomery (Independent), retired nurse
- Jot Thiara (Republican), businessman

=== Withdrawn ===
- Kyle Wilson (Democratic), labor attorney

== Endorsements ==
Audrey Denney (D)

Organizations

- EMILY's List
James Gallagher (R)

Executive branch officials

- Donald Trump, president of the United States (2017–2021, 2025–present)

U.S. representatives

- Ken Calvert, CA-41 (1993–present)
- Vince Fong, CA-20 (2024–present)
- Darrell Issa, CA-48 (2001–2019, 2021–present)
- Kevin Kiley, CA-03 (2023–present)
- Young Kim, CA-40 (2021–present)
- Tom McClintock, CA-05 (2009–present)
- Jay Obernolte, CA-23 (2021–present)
- David Valadao, CA-22 (2013–2019, 2021–present)

Individuals

- Jill LaMalfa, widow of Doug LaMalfa
Mike McGuire (D)

Newspapers

- The Sacramento Bee

== Results ==
2026 California's 1st congressional district special election
Party	Candidate	Votes	%
Republican	James Gallagher	123,551	62.10
Democratic	Audrey Denney	36,841	18.52
Democratic	Mike McGuire	34,319	17.25
Republican	Jot Thiara	2,423	1.22
No party preference	Richard Montgomery	1,808	0.91
Total votes		198,942	100.00
Republican hold			

=== By county ===
County	James Gallagher Republican		Audrey Denney Democratic		Mike McGuire Democratic		Other candidates Various parties		Margin		Total votes cast
County	#	%	#	%	#	%	#	%	#	%	Total votes cast
Butte	32,090	52.84%	15,461	25.46%	12,648	20.83%	526	0.87%	16,629	27.38%	60,725
Colusa	2,861	67.97%	546	12.97%	702	16.68%	100	2.38%	2,159	51.29%	4,209
Glenn	4,514	70.80%	809	12.69%	904	14.18%	149	2.34%	3,610	56.62%	6,376
Lassen	5,269	73.34%	806	11.22%	748	10.41%	361	5.03%	4,463	62.12%	7,184
Modoc	1,990	75.12%	343	12.95%	274	10.34%	42	1.59%	1,647	62.17%	2,649
Shasta	35,434	66.61%	8,577	16.12%	8,177	15.37%	1,012	1.90%	26,857	50.48%	53,200
Siskiyou	7,917	58.37%	3,700	27.28%	1,668	12.30%	278	2.05%	4,217	31.09%	13,563
Sutter	14,661	65.01%	2,843	12.61%	4,168	18.48%	881	3.91%	10,493	46.53%	22,553
Tehama	11,514	70.88%	1,984	12.21%	2,277	14.02%	469	2.89%	9,237	56.86%	16,244
Yuba (part)	7,301	59.65%	1,772	14.48%	2,753	22.49%	413	3.37%	4,548	37.16%	12,239
Totals	123,551	62.10%	36,841	18.52%	34,319	17.25%	4,231	2.13%	86,710	43.59%	198,942
