= Brice H. McNeil =

American politician

Brice Hoguland McNeil (March 6, 1848 – August 11, 1916) was an American politician. He served in the California State Assembly and represented the 3rd district.
