= Louis P. Branstetter =

American politician

Lewis Phillip Branstetter

Member of the California State Assembly

Member of the U.S. House of Representatives from 's 3rd district
- In office 1905–1907

Personal details
- Born: June 20, 1862
- Died: March 30, 1942 (aged 79)

Lewis Phillip Branstetter (June 20, 1862 – March 30, 1942) was an American politician. He served in the California State Assembly from 1905 to 1907, representing the 3rd district.
