= California's 3rd State Assembly district =

American legislative district

- Current assemblymember: Vacant
- Population: 495,048
- Demographics: 57.3% White; 1.7% Black; 25.6% Latino; 7.2% Asian; 1.4% Native American; 0.3% Hawaiian/Pacific Islander; 0.6% other; 6.0% remainder of multiracial
- Registration: 38.41% Republican; 32.13% Democratic; 22.79% No party preference

California's 3rd State Assembly district is one of 80 California State Assembly districts. The seat has been vacant since June 9, 2026, and was most recently represented by Republican James Gallagher of Yuba City.

== District profile ==
The district consists of much of the northern Sacramento Valley, along with parts of the adjacent foothills. The district is primarily rural.

All of Butte County

- Biggs
- Chico
- Gridley
- Oroville
- Paradise

All of Glenn County

- Orland
- Willows

Placer County – part

- Sheridan

All of Sutter County

- Live Oak
- Yuba City

All of Tehama County

- Corning
- Red Bluff
- Tehama

All of Yuba County

- Marysville
- Wheatland

== Election results from statewide races ==
Year	Office	Results
2024	President	Trump 58.2 - 38.9%
2021	Recall	Yes 61.6 – 38.4%
2020	President	Trump 54.5 - 42.9%
2018	Governor	Cox 59.7 – 40.3%
2018	Senator	de Leon 59.2 – 40.8%
2016	President	Trump 53.3 – 39.5%
2016	Senator	Harris 56.8 – 43.2%
2014	Governor	Kashkari 56.3 – 43.7%
2012	President	Romney 52.5 – 42.4%
2012	Senator	Emken 55.4 – 44.6%

== List of assembly members representing the district ==
Due to redistricting, the 3rd district has been moved around different parts of the state. The current iteration resulted from the 2021 redistricting by the California Citizens Redistricting Commission.

Assembly members	Party	Years served	Counties represented	Notes
John H. G. Weaver	Republican	January 5, 1885 – January 3, 1887	Humboldt	
J. F. McGowan	Republican	January 3, 1887 – January 7, 1889	Humboldt	
George Williams	Republican	January 7, 1889 – January 5, 1891	Humboldt	
E. D. Kellogg	American	January 5, 1891 – January 2, 1893	Humboldt	
Darlington Jeffries Johnson	Republican	January 2, 1893 – January 4, 1897	Humboldt	
E. D. Damon	Republican	January 4, 1897 – January 2, 1899	Humboldt	
Cyrus H. Boynton	Republican	January 2, 1899 – January 5, 1901	Humboldt	
Brice H. McNeil	Republican	January 5, 1901 – January 2, 1905	Humboldt	
Lewis Phillip Branstetter	Republican	January 2, 1905 – January 7, 1907	Humboldt	
John Wilburt McClellan	Republican	January 7, 1907 – January 2, 1911	Humboldt	
Gustavus Adolphus Jasper	Republican	January 2, 1911 – January 6, 1913	Humboldt	
Charles William White	Republican	January 6, 1913 – January 4, 1915	Shasta, Trinity	
Charles Carroll McCray	Republican	January 4, 1915 – January 3, 1921	Shasta, Trinity	
Albert Frederick Ross Jr.	Republican	January 3, 1921 – January 8, 1923	Shasta, Trinity	
Earnest Dozier	Republican	January 8, 1923 – January 5, 1925	Shasta, Trinity	
Roscoe J. Anderson	Republican	January 5, 1925 – January 5, 1931	Shasta, Trinity	
Jerrold L. Seawell	Republican	January 5, 1931 – January 2, 1933	Lassen, Nevada, Placer, Plumas, Sierra	
John H. O'Donnell	Democratic	January 2, 1933 – January 6, 1941	Colusa, Glenn, Tehama, Yolo	
Lloyd W. Lowrey	Democratic	January 6, 1941 – January 7, 1963	Colusa, Glenn, Tehama, Yolo	
Leroy F. Greene	Democratic	January 7, 1963 – November 30, 1974	Sacramento	
Eugene A. Chappie	Republican	December 7, 1974 – November 30, 1980	Butte, Colusa, Nevada, Placer, Sierra, Sutter, Yuba	
Wally Herger	Republican	December 1, 1980 – November 30, 1986	Butte, Colusa, Nevada, Placer, Sierra, Sutter, Yuba	
Wally Herger	Republican	December 1, 1980 – November 30, 1986	Butte, Colusa, Nevada, Sierra, Sutter	
Christopher Chandler	Republican	December 1, 1986 – November 30, 1992	Butte, Colusa, Nevada, Sierra, Sutter	
Bernie Richter	Republican	December 7, 1992 – November 30, 1998	Butte, Lassen, Modoc, Nevada, Plumas, Sierra, Yuba	
Sam Aanestad	Republican	December 7, 1998 – November 30, 2002	Butte, Lassen, Modoc, Nevada, Plumas, Sierra, Yuba	
Rick Keene	Republican	December 2, 2002 – November 30, 2008	Butte, Lassen, Modoc, Nevada, Plumas, Sierra, Yuba	
Dan Logue	Republican	December 1, 2008 – November 30, 2014	Butte, Lassen, Modoc, Nevada, Plumas, Sierra, Yuba	
Dan Logue	Republican	December 1, 2008 – November 30, 2014	Butte, Colusa, Glenn, Sutter, Tehama, Yuba	
James Gallagher	Republican	December 1, 2014 – June 9, 2026	Butte, Colusa, Glenn, Sutter, Tehama, Yuba	
Vacant		June 9, 2026 – present	Butte, Colusa, Glenn, Sutter, Tehama, Yuba	Gallagher was elected to the 1st congressional election in the 2026 special election.
Dom Belza	Republican	December 2026 – present		

== Election results (1990–present) ==
=== 2024 ===
2024 California State Assembly 3rd district election
Primary election
Party	Candidate	Votes	%
Republican	James Gallagher (incumbent)	76,570	68.4
Democratic	Aaron Draper	35,434	31.6
Total votes		112,004	100.0
General election
Republican	James Gallagher (incumbent)	131,578	66.3
Democratic	Aaron Draper	66,962	34.6
Total votes		198,540	100
Republican hold			

=== 2022 ===
2022 California State Assembly 3rd district election
Primary election
Party	Candidate	Votes	%
Republican	James Gallagher (incumbent)	65,115	66.9
Democratic	David Zink	33,513	34.0
Democratic	Jeannene Hosten (write-in)	41	0.0
Total votes		98,669	100.0
General election
Republican	James Gallagher (incumbent)	98,475	65.4
Democratic	David Zink	52,198	34.6
Total votes		250,673	100.0
Republican hold			

=== 2020 ===
2020 California State Assembly 3rd district election
Primary election
Party	Candidate	Votes	%
Republican	James Gallagher (incumbent)	83,022	65.3
Democratic	James R. Henson	44,107	34.7
Total votes		127,129	100.0
General election
Republican	James Gallagher (incumbent)	130,163	63.7
Democratic	James R. Henson	74,201	36.3
Total votes		204,364	100.0
Republican hold			

=== 2018 ===
2018 California State Assembly 3rd district election
Primary election
Party	Candidate	Votes	%
Republican	James Gallagher (incumbent)	64,975	65.0
Democratic	Sonia Aery	34,941	35.0
Total votes		99,916	100.0
General election
Republican	James Gallagher (incumbent)	95,786	60.2
Democratic	Sonia Aery	63,445	39.8
Total votes		159,231	100.0
Republican hold			

=== 2016 ===
2016 California State Assembly 3rd district election
Primary election
Party	Candidate	Votes	%
Republican	James Gallagher (incumbent)	66,686	61.0
Democratic	Edward Ritchie	42,700	39.0
Democratic	Bryce Corron (write-in)	12	0.0
Total votes		109,398	100.0
General election
Republican	James Gallagher (incumbent)	108,910	63.0
Democratic	Edward Ritchie	63,867	37.0
Total votes		172,777	100.0
Republican hold			

=== 2014 ===
2014 California State Assembly 3rd district election
Primary election
Party	Candidate	Votes	%
Republican	James Gallagher	34,744	44.4
Democratic	Jim Reed	26,557	34.0
Republican	Ryan Schohr	16,906	21.6
Total votes		78,207	100.0
General election
Republican	James Gallagher	69,552	63.1
Democratic	Jim Reed	40,732	36.9
Total votes		104,284	100.0
Republican hold			

=== 2012 ===
2012 California State Assembly 3rd district election
Primary election
Party	Candidate	Votes	%
Republican	Dan Logue (incumbent)	38,742	42.9
Democratic	Charles Rouse	28,926	32.0
Republican	Bob Williams	22,657	25.1
Total votes		90,325	100.0
General election
Republican	Dan Logue (incumbent)	86,692	55.6
Democratic	Charles Rouse	69,265	44.4
Total votes		155,957	100.0
Republican hold			

=== 2010 ===
2010 California State Assembly 3rd district election
Party	Candidate	Votes	%
Republican	Dan Logue (incumbent)	84,069	54.2
Democratic	Michael Harrington	56,812	36.6
Libertarian	Gary Bryant	14,420	9.2
Total votes		155,301	100.0
Republican hold			

=== 2008 ===
2008 California State Assembly 3rd district election
Party	Candidate	Votes	%
Republican	Daniel Logue	104,755	55.5
Democratic	Michael Harrington	83,950	44.5
Total votes		188,705	100.0
Republican hold			

=== 2006 ===
2006 California State Assembly 3rd district election
Party	Candidate	Votes	%
Republican	Rick Keene (incumbent)	87,758	61.0
Democratic	Michael J. Harrington	56,101	39.0
Total votes		143,859	100.0
Republican hold			

=== 2004 ===
2004 California State Assembly 3rd district election
Party	Candidate	Votes	%
Republican	Rick Keene (incumbent)	111,747	59.3
Democratic	Robert A. Woods	70,126	37.2
Libertarian	Robert Burk	6,421	3.4
Total votes		188,294	100.0
Republican hold			

=== 2002 ===
2002 California State Assembly 3rd district election
Party	Candidate	Votes	%
Republican	Rick Keene	78,225	61.5
Democratic	Stuart Randall King	43,096	33.8
Libertarian	Jon Petersen	5,987	4.7
Total votes		127,308	100.0
Republican hold			

=== 2000 ===
2000 California State Assembly 3rd district election
Party	Candidate	Votes	%
Republican	Sam Aanestad (incumbent)	99,336	61.4
Democratic	Benjamin Wirtschafter	52,978	32.7
Libertarian	William L. Thomason	9,601	5.9
Total votes		161,915	100.0
Republican hold			

=== 1998 ===
1998 California State Assembly 3rd district election
Party	Candidate	Votes	%
Republican	Sam Aanestad	78,683	60.9
Democratic	Scott Gruendl	50,511	39.1
Total votes		129,194	100.0
Republican hold			

=== 1996 ===
1996 California State Assembly 3rd district election
Party	Candidate	Votes	%
Republican	Bernie Richter (incumbent)	94,765	61.6
Democratic	Irene Perry	59,159	38.4
Total votes		153,924	100.0
Republican hold			

=== 1994 ===
1994 California State Assembly 3rd district election
Party	Candidate	Votes	%
Republican	Bernie Richter (incumbent)	84,341	63.3
Democratic	Jim Chapman	48,798	36.7
Total votes		133,139	100.0
Republican hold			

=== 1992 ===
1992 California State Assembly 3rd district election
Party	Candidate	Votes	%
Republican	Bernie Richter (incumbent)	85,685	51.7
Democratic	Lon Hatamiya	62,540	37.7
Libertarian	Vicki Lynn Vallis	17,502	10.6
Total votes		165,727	100.0
Republican hold			

=== 1990 ===
1990 California State Assembly 3rd district election
Party	Candidate	Votes	%
Republican	Christopher Chandler (incumbent)	64,994	54.0
Democratic	Lon S. Hatamiya	55,277	46.0
Total votes		120,271	100.0
Republican hold			

== See also ==
- California State Assembly
- California State Assembly districts
- Districts in California
