= Sam Aanestad =

American politician

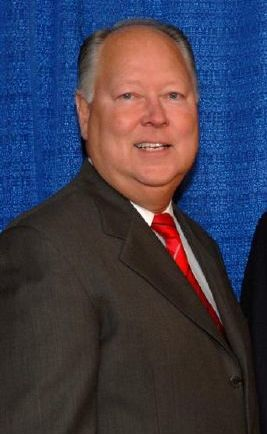

Member of the California Senate from the 4th district
- In office December 2, 2002 – November 30, 2010
- Preceded by: Maurice Johannessen
- Succeeded by: Doug LaMalfa

Member of the California State Assembly from the 3rd district
- In office December 7, 1998 – November 30, 2002
- Preceded by: Bernie Richter
- Succeeded by: Rick Keene

Personal details
- Born: Samuel Mark Aanestad; July 16, 1946 Bismarck, North Dakota, U.S.
- Died: May 6, 2018 (aged 71) Penn Valley, California, U.S.
- Party: Republican
- Spouse: Susan Aanestad
- Children: 3
- Education: University of California, Los Angeles (B.A. and DDS); Golden Gate University (MPA, 1991)
- Profession: oral and maxillofacial surgeon

Samuel Mark Aanestad (July 16, 1946 – May 6, 2018) was an American physician, surgeon, and politician. A Republican, he served in the California State Assembly from the 3rd District from 1998 to 2002 and a member of the California State Senate from the 4th district from 2002 to 2010. He was an unsuccessful candidate for California's 1st Congressional District, which was being vacated by retiring Congressman Wally Herger.

== Education and early career ==
Aanestad was born in Bismarck, North Dakota. He received both his Bachelor of Arts and Doctor of Dental Surgery (DDS) degrees from the University of California, Los Angeles. He then did a four-year Oral and Maxillofacial Surgery residency at Highland Hospital in Oakland. Aanestad received a Master in Public Administration degree from Golden Gate University in 1991. He was honored by the UCLA School of Dentistry as their "Alumnus of the Year" in November 1998.

Aanestad was a practicing dentist in Grass Valley, and served as the Vice-Chief of Surgery at Sierra Nevada Memorial Hospital. He served three terms on the California Dental Association Council on Legislation, including three years as chairman, and he served two terms as president of the Butte-Sierra District Dental Society. He was also a member of the California and American Dental Association.

Aanestad served 11 years on the Grass Valley School District Board of Trustees. He was a member of the Rotary Club of Grass Valley, a youth soccer, football, and baseball coach, and as a member of the KNCO radio broadcast team for Nevada Union High School football.

== State legislature ==
Aanestad was elected to the California State Assembly in 1998 to represent the 3rd District. In 2002, Aanestad was elected to the California State Senate, where he served for two terms.

In the State Senate, Aanestad's top priorities included rural health care, protecting North State water, and constituent services.

== Lieutenant governor campaign ==
Aanestad ran in the Republican primary for Lieutenant Governor of California in 2010. He was defeated by Abel Maldonado, coming in second place with 31% of the vote.

== Congressional campaign ==
On February 9, 2012, Aanestad announced that he is officially running for the open 1st Congressional District in California being vacated by retiring Congressman Wally Herger. Aanestad, who has represented most of this 1st Congressional District over the past twelve years, was endorsed by Rep. Tom McClintock, a longtime friend and mentor who served with Aanestad in the Assembly and Senate.

Aanestad came third in the open primary losing to fellow Republican State Sen. Doug LaMalfa and Democrat Jim Reed. The top two vote-getters faced off in the general election on Nov. 6, 2012.

== Personal life ==
Aanestad and his wife Susan lived in the 4th Senate District since 1980. The couple had three children. Aanestad died in Nevada County on May 6, 2018, after a long illness.

California Assembly
Preceded by Bernie Richter	California State Assemblyman; 3rd District; 1998–2002	Succeeded by Rick Keene
California Senate
Preceded by Maurice Johannessen	California State Senator; 4th District; 2002-2010	Succeeded by Doug LaMalfa
