= Bernie Richter =

American politician

Bernard Dartanian Richter

Member of the California State Assembly from the 3rd district
- In office December 7, 1992 – November 30, 1998
- Preceded by: Christopher Chandler
- Succeeded by: Sam Aanestad

Personal details
- Born: September 7, 1931 Los Angeles, California, U.S.
- Died: October 25, 1999 (aged 68) Enloe Medical Center, Chico, California, U.S.
- Resting place: Chico Cemetery, Chico, California
- Party: Republican (formerly a Democrat)
- Spouse: Mary La Rae (m. 1953-1999; his death)
- Children: 3
- Education: University of California, Los Angeles
- Occupation: Teacher, business owner

Bernard Dartanian Richter (September 7, 1931 – October 25, 1999) was a Republican member of the California State Assembly from the 3rd district from 1992 to 1998. Prior to his terms in the Assembly, he served on the Butte County Board of Supervisors.

== Early life and family ==
Richter attended the University of California, Los Angeles on a football scholarship. During the 1950s, he served in the Army Corps of Engineers.

From 1967-75, Richter taught high school civics at Chico High School. He operated family-owned video and liquor stores in Chico named Ray's liquor which still popular until now. Richter and his wife Rae were the parents of three daughters.

== Political career ==
=== Butte County Board of Supervisors ===
He was a member of the Butte County Board of Supervisors representing Butte County's 2nd district in Chico from 1972 to 1976.

=== California Assembly ===
Richter was an outspoken opponent of affirmative action and was the legislative author of Proposition 209 to end the practice in 1994.

In 1994, the Republicans were able to attain a one-vote majority in the Assembly. At this point Democrat Willie Brown had maintained power as speaker for 15 years, and this was the first opportunity to unseat him. However, in the end, Brown was able to get one Republican, Paul Horcher, to vote for him keeping him as speaker. During this time, Richter, also attempted to become speaker with the support of all or most of the Democrats. Richter tried to gain the support of his fellow Republicans, but succeeded only in angering them. He was term limited out of the assembly in 1998.

== Death ==
He died at Enloe Medical Center after suffering a heart attack at his home in Chico on October 25, 1999. At the time of his death, he was in the initial stages of a campaign for the 1st Senate district. He was preparing to face Rico Oller for the Republican nomination.

== Legacy ==
The 5-mile segment of Highway 99 south of its intersection with Highway 70 in Sutter County is named the "Bernie Richter Memorial Highway".

== Sources ==
Political offices
Preceded by Christopher Chandler	Member of the California State Assembly from the 3rd district 1992–1998	Succeeded by Sam Aanestad
