= John H. G. Weaver =

American politician

John H. G. Weaver was an American politician. He served in the California State Assembly. He was a resident of Eureka, California.
