= James Gallagher (California politician) =

American politician (born 1981)

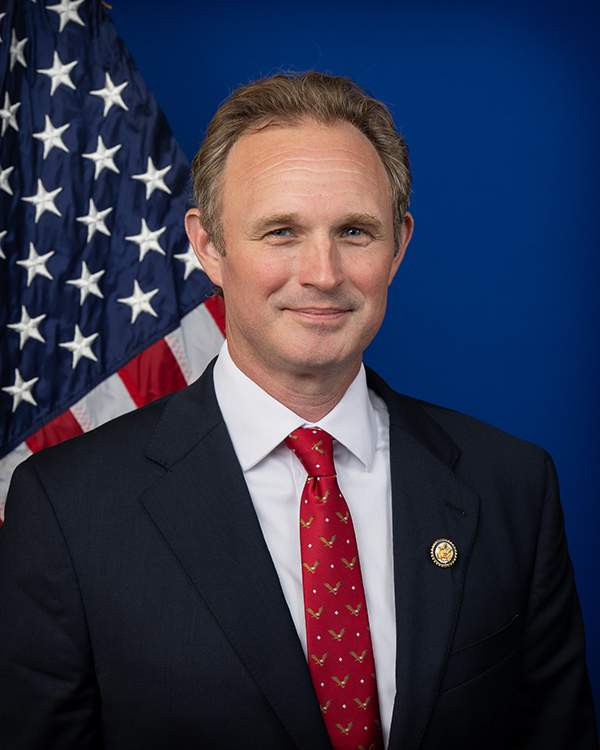
- Official portrait, 2026

Member of the U.S. House of Representatives from California's 1st district
- Incumbent
- Assumed office June 10, 2026
- Preceded by: Doug LaMalfa

Minority Leader of the California Assembly
- In office February 8, 2022 – September 16, 2025
- Preceded by: Marie Waldron
- Succeeded by: Heath Flora

Member of the California State Assembly from the 3rd district
- In office December 1, 2014 – June 9, 2026
- Preceded by: Dan Logue
- Succeeded by: Dom Belza

Member of the Sutter County Board of Supervisors from the 5th district
- In office January 13, 2009 – December 1, 2014
- Preceded by: Dan Silva
- Succeeded by: Barbara LeVake

Personal details
- Born: James Matthew Gallagher; March 4, 1981 (age 45) Yuba City, California, U.S.
- Party: Republican
- Spouse: Janna
- Children: 5
- Education: University of California, Berkeley (BA); University of California, Davis (JD)
- Website: House website Campaign website

James Matthew Gallagher (born March 7, 1981) is an American politician who has served as the U.S. representative from California's 1st congressional district since 2026. A member of the Republican Party, he previously served in the California State Assembly from 2014 to 2026, representing the 3rd district located in the northern Sacramento Valley. Gallagher served as the Minority Leader of the California State Assembly from 2022 to 2025. He lost election to a full term to Democrat Mike McGuire.

== Early life and education ==
Gallagher was born on March 7, 1981. He is the descendant of Irish immigrants who settled northern California in the early 1800s. His paternal grandfather, Robert Gallagher, served on the Sutter County Board of Supervisors from 1985 to 1989.

After graduating from East Nicolaus High School, Gallagher earned a bachelor's degree in political science from UC Berkeley. Gallagher earned a JD degree from UC Davis.

== Career ==
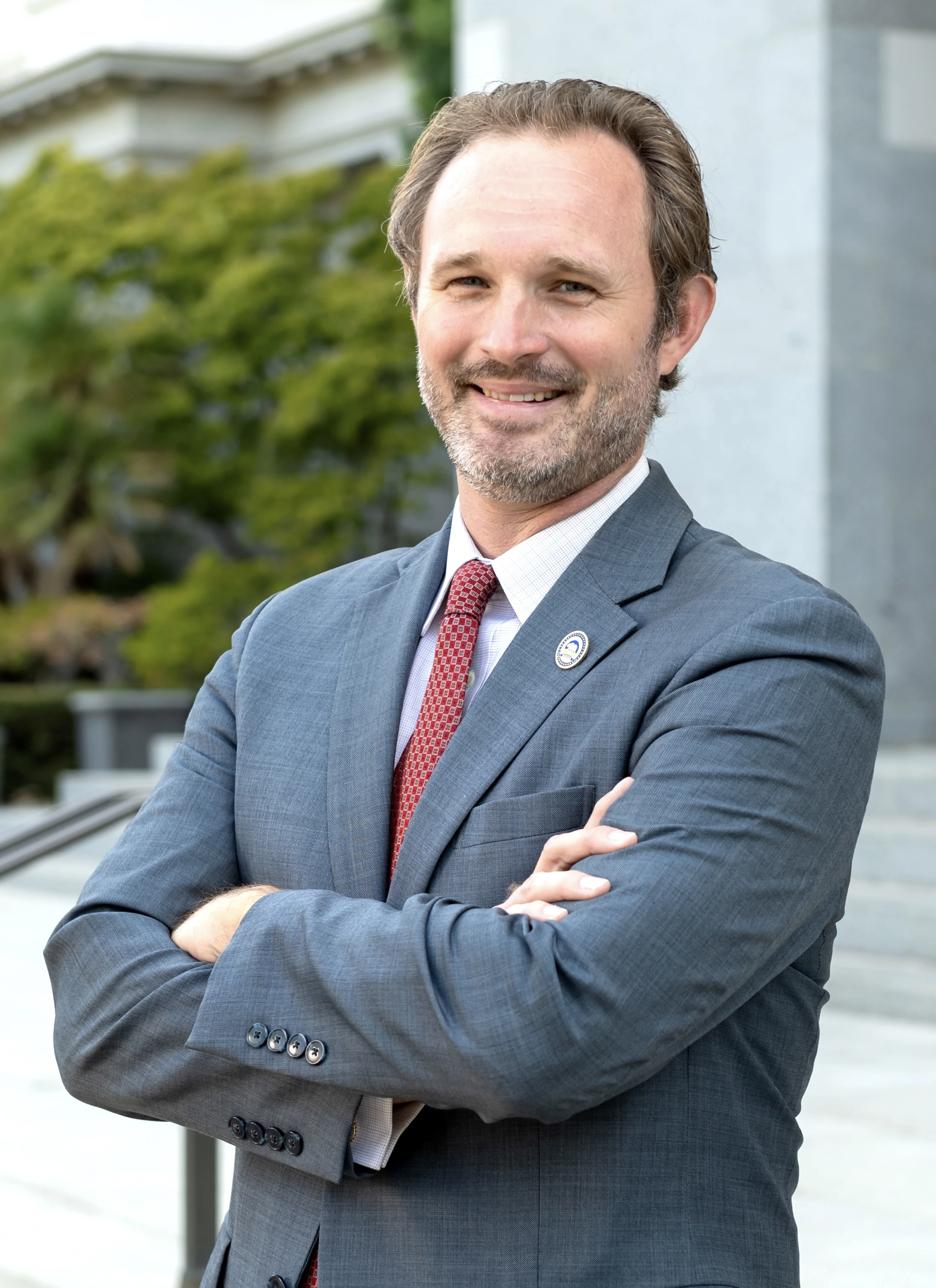
Gallagher while serving in California State Assembly, 2024

Gallagher's political career began when he worked for state Assemblyman Doug LaMalfa as a fellow in a Fellowship Program.

Since 2007, Gallagher has been practicing law. He is a partner in his family's fifth generation rice and walnut farming operation. In 2008, Gallagher was elected to the Sutter County Board of Supervisors, where he served until his election to the State Assembly.

On November 4, 2014, Gallagher won the election and succeeded fellow Republican Dan Logue, who ran unsuccessfully for Congress that year. Gallagher is a Republican. In 2017, Gallagher became the Republican Caucus Chairman of the California General Assembly.

== U.S. House of Representatives (2026-present) ==
=== Elections ===
==== 2026 special ====
In 2026, Gallagher ran for the open seat for California's 1st congressional district in the United States House of Representatives made vacant after the death of Doug LaMalfa. He received the endorsement of President Donald Trump and 8 other Republican congressmen from the state. He defeated Democratic challengers Audrey Denney and Mike McGuire in the special election by a large margin. The special election also coincided with the primary election for the new district boundaries, in which Gallagher and McGuire both advanced, setting up a rematch in the November general election. He was sworn into the U.S. House of Representatives on June 10, 2026.

=== 2026 general ===
Gallagher again faces McGuire in the general election under new lines following the passage of Proposition 50. The primary for the general election was held simultaneously with the general election, which Gallagher won outright 62.10% of the vote while winning only 42.08% in the primary.

=== Committee assignments ===
- Committee on Foreign Affairs
  - Subcommittee on South and Central Asia
  - Subcommittee on Western Hemisphere
- Committee on Transportation and Infrastructure
  - Subcommittee on Aviation
  - Subcommittee on Highways and Transit
  - Subcommittee on Railroads, Pipelines, and Hazardous Materials
- Committee on Science, Space, and Technology

=== Caucus memberships ===
- Congressional Western Caucus
- Republican Study Committee

== Personal life ==
Gallagher's wife is Janna; they met in kindergarten while attending Browns School in Rio Oso, California. They have five children.

== Electoral history ==
Electoral history of Candidate Name
Year	Office		Party	Primary			General			Result	Swing	Ref.
Year	Office		Party	Total	%	P.	Total	%	P.	Result	Swing	Ref.
2014	California State Assembly	3rd	Republican	34,744	44.4	1st	69,552	63.1	1st	Won	Hold	
2016	California State Assembly	3rd	Republican	66,686	61.0	1st	108,910	63.0	1st	Won	Hold	
2018	California State Assembly	3rd	Republican	64,975	65.0	1st	95,786	60.2	1st	Won	Hold	
2020	California State Assembly	3rd	Republican	83,022	65.3	1st	130,163	63.7	1st	Won	Hold	
2022	California State Assembly	3rd	Republican	65,115	66.0	1st	98,475	65.4	1st	Won	Hold	
2024	California State Assembly	3rd	Republican	76,570	68.4	1st	131,578	66.3	1st	Won	Hold	
2026	U.S. House	1st	Republican	123,551	62.10	1st				Won	Hold	
2026	U.S. House	1st	Republican	92,975	42.1	1st	TBD					
Source: Secretary of State of California | Statewide Election Results

California Assembly
Preceded by Marie Waldron	Minority Leader of the California Assembly; 2022–2025	Succeeded by Heath Flora
U.S. House of Representatives
Preceded by Doug LaMalfa	Member of the U.S. House of Representatives from California's 1st congressional district 2026–present	Incumbent
U.S. order of precedence (ceremonial)
Preceded by Analilia Mejia	United States representatives by seniority 431st	Succeeded by Everton Blair
