= Casarejos =

- Municipality
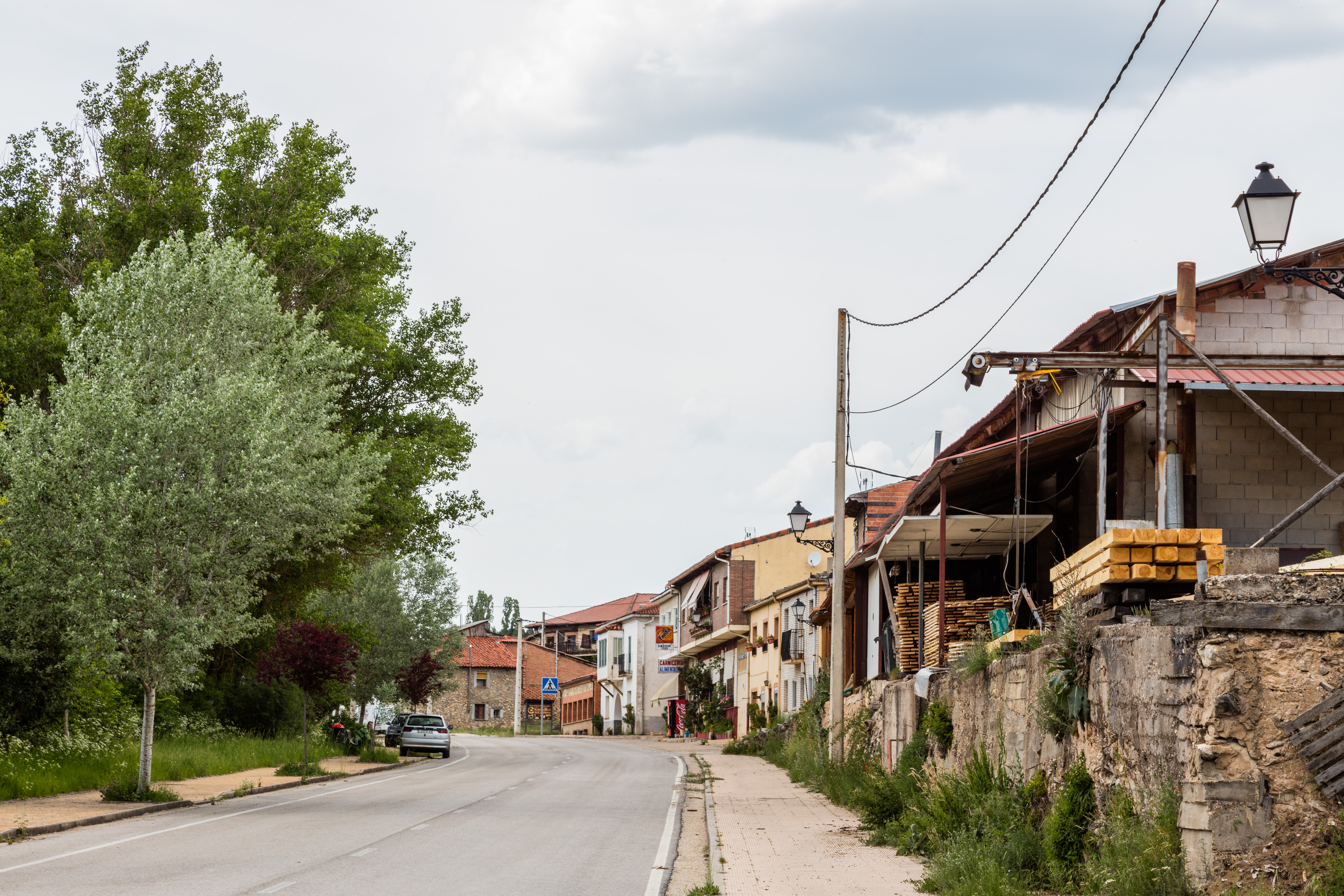
- Street of Casarejos, Soria, Spain

- Location in Spain. Casarejos (Spain)
- Country: Spain
- Autonomous community: Castile and León
- Province: Soria
- Municipality: Casarejos

Area
  - Total: 28 km^{2} (11 sq mi)

Population (2025-01-01)
  - Total: 145
  - Density: 5.2/km^{2} (13/sq mi)
- Time zone: UTC+1 (CET)
  - Summer (DST): UTC+2 (CEST)
- Website: Official website

Casarejos is a municipality located in the province of Soria, Castile and León, Spain. According to the 2004 census (INE), the municipality has a population of 256 inhabitants.

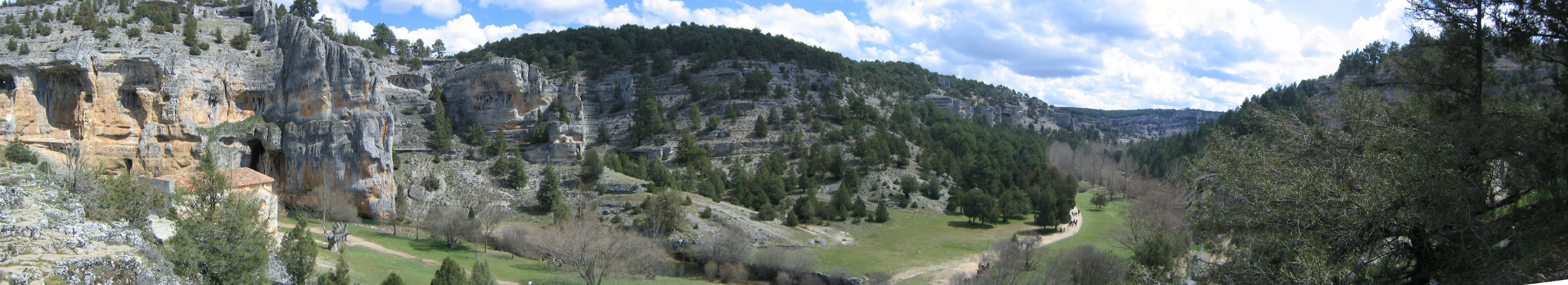
View of Río Lobos Canyon, the town is part of this natural park.
