= United States House Transportation Subcommittee on Railroads, Pipelines, and Hazardous Materials =

U.S. House of Representatives committee

Subcommittee of Committee on Transportation and Infrastructure
- Active United States House of Representatives; 119th Congress

Leadership
- Chair: Daniel Webster (R)
- Ranking Member: Dina Titus (D)

Structure
- Seats: 31 (29 currently filled) 15/17 14/14
- Political parties: Majority (15): Republican (15); Minority (14): Democratic (14)

Meeting place
- 2165, Rayburn House Office Building; Washington, D.C. 20515

Phone number
- (202)-225-9446

The Subcommittee on Railroads, Pipelines, and Hazardous Materials is a subcommittee within the House Transportation and Infrastructure Committee.

== Jurisdiction ==
The Subcommittee oversees regulation of railroads by the Surface Transportation Board, including economic regulations; Amtrak, rail safety, the Federal Railroad Administration, and the National Mediation Board, which handles railway labor disputes. It is also oversees of the Pipeline and Hazardous Materials Safety Administration within the U.S. Department of Transportation, which is responsible for the safety of the nation's oil and gas pipelines as well as the transportation of hazardous materials.

== Members, 119th Congress ==
Majority	Minority
Daniel Webster, Florida, Chair; David Rouzer, North Carolina; Mike Bost, Illinois; Doug LaMalfa, California; Pete Stauber, Minnesota; Tim Burchett, Tennessee; Dusty Johnson, South Dakota; Troy Nehls, Texas; Tracey Mann, Kansas; Burgess Owens, Utah; Eric Burlison, Missouri; Vince Fong, California; Nick Begich III, Alaska, Vice Chair; Jefferson Shreve, Indiana; David Taylor, Ohio; Mike Kennedy, Utah	Dina Titus, Ranking Member; André Carson, Indiana; Seth Moulton, Massachusetts; Valerie Foushee, North Carolina; Chris Deluzio, Pennsylvania, Vice Ranking Member; Jerry Nadler, New York; Chuy García, Illinois; Steve Cohen, Tennessee; Hank Johnson, Georgia; Frederica Wilson, Florida; Pat Ryan, New York; Emilia Sykes, Ohio; Laura Friedman, California; Mark DeSaulnier, California
Ex officio
Sam Graves, Missouri	Rick Larsen, Washington

== Historical membership rosters ==
=== 115th Congress ===
Majority	Minority
Jeff Denham, California, Chair; Jimmy Duncan, Tennessee; Sam Graves, Missouri; Lou Barletta, Pennsylvania; Blake Farenthold, Texas (until April 6, 2018); Daniel Webster, Florida; Mark Walker, North Carolina; Scott Perry, Pennsylvania; Mark Sanford South Carolina; Todd Rokita, Indiana; John Katko, New York; Brian Babin Texas; Randy Weber, Texas; Bruce Westerman, Arkansas; Lloyd Smucker, Pennsylvania; Paul Mitchell, Michigan; John Faso, New York, Vice Chair; Jason Lewis, Minnesota	Mike Capuano, Massachusetts, Ranking Member; Donald Payne Jr., New Jersey; Jerrold Nadler, New York; Elijah Cummings, Maryland; Steve Cohen, Tennessee; Albio Sires, New Jersey; John Garamendi, California; André Carson, Indiana; Rick Nolan, Minnesota; Elizabeth Esty, Connecticut; Cheri Bustos, Illinois; Frederica Wilson, Florida; Mark DeSaulnier, California; Dan Lipinski, Illinois
Ex officio
Bill Shuster, Pennsylvania	Peter DeFazio, Oregon

=== 116th Congress ===
Majority	Minority
Dan Lipinski, Illinois, Chair; Albio Sires, New Jersey; Donald Payne, New Jersey; Lizzie Fletcher, Texas; Elijah Cummings, Maryland; André Carson, Indiana; Frederica Wilson, Florida; Mark DeSaulnier, California; Stephen Lynch, Massachusetts; Tom Malinowski, New Jersey; Grace Napolitano, California; Steve Cohen, Tennessee; Chuy García, Illinois; Eleanor Holmes Norton, District of Columbia; Eddie Bernice Johnson, Texas; Alan Lowenthal, California; Colin Allred, Texas; Angie Craig, Minnesota	Rick Crawford, Arkansas, Ranking Member; Scott Perry, Pennsylvania; Rodney Davis, Illinois; Brian Babin, Texas; Mike Bost, Illinois; Randy Weber, Texas; Doug LaMalfa, California; Lloyd Smucker, Pennsylvania; Paul Mitchell, Michigan; Brian Fitzpatrick, Pennsylvania; Troy Balderson, Ohio; Ross Spano, Florida; Pete Stauber, Minnesota; Greg Pence, Indiana
Ex officio
Peter DeFazio, Oregon	Sam Graves, Missouri

=== 117th Congress ===
Majority	Minority
Donald Payne Jr., New Jersey, Chair; Tom Malinowski, New Jersey; Seth Moulton, Massachusetts; Marie Newman, Illinois; Steve Cohen, Tennessee; Albio Sires, New Jersey; André Carson, Indiana; Frederica Wilson, Florida; Jesús "Chuy" García, Illinois; Marilyn Strickland, Washington, Vice Chair; Grace Napolitano, California; Hank Johnson, Georgia; Dina Titus, Nevada; Jared Huffman, California; Stephen Lynch, Massachusetts; Jake Auchincloss, Massachusetts; Troy Carter, Louisiana	Rick Crawford, Arkansas, Ranking Member; Scott Perry, Pennsylvania; Rodney Davis, Illinois; Mike Bost, Illinois; Randy Weber, Texas; Doug LaMalfa, California; Bruce Westerman, Arkansas; Brian Fitzpatrick, Pennsylvania; Troy Balderson, Ohio; Pete Stauber, Minnesota; Tim Burchett, Tennessee; Dusty Johnson, South Dakota; Troy Nehls, Texas; Michelle Steel, California
Ex officio
Peter DeFazio, Oregon	Sam Graves, Missouri

=== 118th Congress ===
Majority	Minority
Troy Nehls, Texas, Chair; Brian Babin, Texas; David Rouzer, North Carolina; Mike Bost, Illinois; Doug LaMalfa, California; Bruce Westerman, Arkansas; Pete Stauber, Minnesota; Tim Burchett, Tennessee; Dusty Johnson, South Dakota; Tracey Mann, Kansas; Rudy Yakym, Indiana; Thomas Kean Jr., New Jersey; Eric Burlison, Missouri; Brandon Williams, New York, Vice Chair; Marc Molinaro, New York; John Duarte, California; Vince Fong, California (from June 3, 2024)	Donald Payne Jr., New Jersey, Ranking Member (until April 24, 2024); Frederica Wilson, Florida, Ranking Member (from May 7, 2024); Seth Moulton, Massachusetts; Troy Carter, Louisiana; André Carson, Indiana; Mark DeSaulnier, California; Marilyn Strickland, Washington; Valerie Foushee, North Carolina; Grace Napolitano, California; Steve Cohen, Tennessee; Hank Johnson, Georgia; Jared Huffman, California; Chuy García, Illinois; Rob Menendez, New Jersey
Ex officio
Sam Graves, Missouri	Rick Larsen, Washington
