= Doug LaMalfa =

American politician (1960–2026)

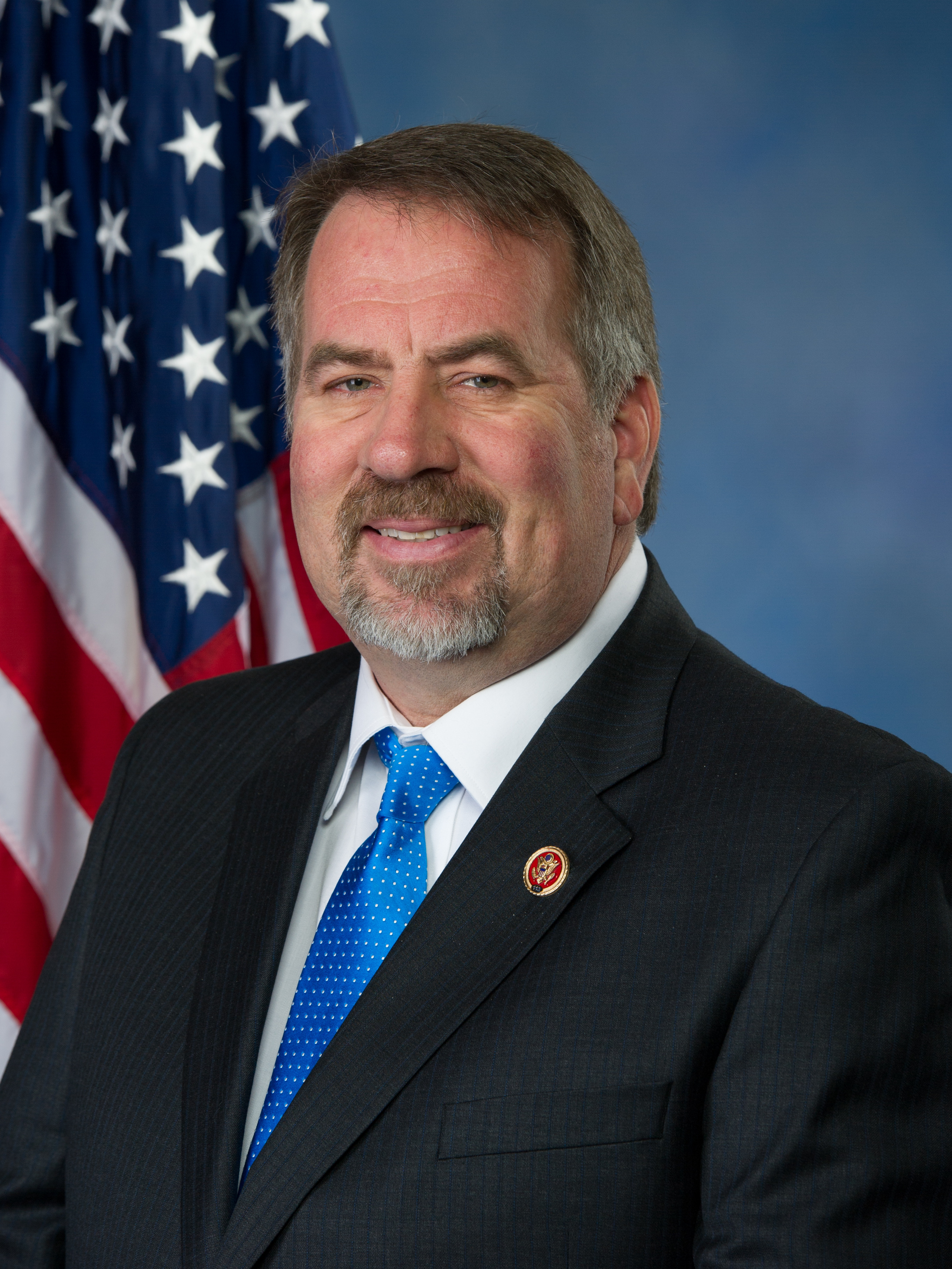
- Official portrait, 2013

Member of the U.S. House of Representatives from California's 1st district
- In office January 3, 2013 – January 6, 2026
- Preceded by: Mike Thompson
- Succeeded by: James Gallagher

Member of the California State Senate from the 4th district
- In office December 6, 2010 – August 31, 2012
- Preceded by: Sam Aanestad
- Succeeded by: Jim Nielsen

Member of the California State Assembly from the 2nd district
- In office December 2, 2002 – November 30, 2008
- Preceded by: Richard Dickerson
- Succeeded by: Jim Nielsen

Personal details
- Born: Douglas Lee LaMalfa; July 2, 1960 Oroville, California, U.S.
- Died: January 6, 2026 (aged 65) Chico, California, U.S.
- Party: Republican
- Spouse: Jill
- Children: 4
- Education: Butte College (attended); California Polytechnic State University, San Luis Obispo (BS)
- Website: House website Campaign website
- LaMalfa's voice LaMalfa in favor of nuclear power. Recorded June 8, 2022

Douglas Lee LaMalfa (/ləˈmælfə/ lə-MAL-fə; July 2, 1960 – January 6, 2026) was an American politician and businessman who served as the U.S. representative for California's 1st congressional district from 2013 until his death in 2026. A member of the Republican Party, his district covered nearly all of interior Northern California, including Chico, Redding, and Susanville.

A native of Oroville, LaMalfa was the California state assemblyman for the 2nd district from 2002 to 2008 and California state senator from the 4th district from 2010 to 2012.

== Early life, education and business career ==
Douglas Lee LaMalfa was born July 2, 1960, in Oroville, California. LaMalfa graduated from Biggs High School in 1978 and received a bachelor's degree in agricultural business from Cal Poly, San Luis Obispo, in 1982. He was a fourth-generation rice farmer.

== California State Assembly ==
=== Elections ===
In 2002, LaMalfa ran for the California State Assembly in the 2nd district. He won the Republican primary with 59% of the vote, and the general election with 67%. He was reelected in 2004 (68%) and 2006 (68%).

=== Tenure ===
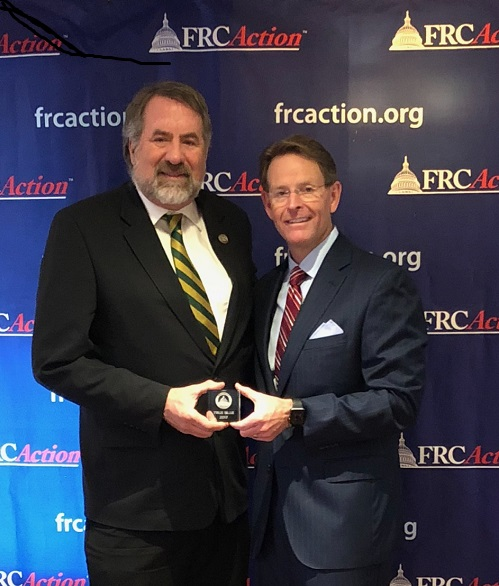
LaMalfa (left) being presented the True Blue award by FRC President Tony Perkins (right)

LaMalfa worked with Bernie Richter as an early supporter of Proposition 209, which ended affirmative action in California. He worked for passage of the Protection of Marriage Act, Proposition 22, which banned same-sex marriage in California, and after the Supreme Court of California overturned that initiative in In re Marriage Cases, he was an early supporter of, and active in, the Proposition 8 campaign, an initiative that would overturn the court ruling and again ban same-sex marriage. In June 2008, he urged voters to approve Proposition 8, saying "This is an opportunity to take back a little bit of dignity ... for kids, for all of us in California. It really disturbs me that the will of the people was overridden by four members of the Supreme Court."

LaMalfa opposed Mike Feuer's microstamping bill, AB 1471, which Governor Arnold Schwarzenegger signed into law on October 13, 2007.

LaMalfa was a co-author of ACA 20, which would empower law enforcement to act as Immigration and Customs Enforcement agents and would have cracked down on illegal immigration.

In 2007, LaMalfa successfully passed AB 1645, a law that would prevent seizures of firearms in the event of an emergency or natural disaster. This was the first pro-gun legislation passed and signed into law in a decade. When he was named the California Rifle and Pistol Association's "Legislator of the Year" for 2007, LaMalfa said, "Receiving this award today from the California Rifle and Pistol Association is a truly humbling honor."

=== Committee assignments ===
- Joint Committee on Legislative Audit
- Public Safety
- West Nile virus

== California State Senate ==
=== 2010 election ===
In 2010, LaMalfa ran for the California State Senate in the 4th district. In the Republican primary, he defeated State Assemblyman Rick Keene 58%–42%. In the general election, he defeated Lathe Gill 68%–32%.

=== Positions ===
In November 2011, LaMalfa opposed a proposed bullet train, saying, "In light of the High Speed Rail plan that was submitted and that the numbers still do not work, California in this dire fiscal crisis that we're in, we're going to introduce legislation to repeal the HSR Authority and the funding for that the state was going to put forward".

LaMalfa opposed a bill that would require history teachers in all California public schools to teach history of homosexuality and gay civil rights. He said that Governor Jerry Brown was "out of touch with what I think are still mainstream American values. That's not the kind of stuff I want my kids learning about in public school. They've really crossed a line into a new frontier."

LaMalfa strongly opposed the National Popular Vote Interstate Compact, which would bypass the United States Electoral College, saying, "I think this is dangerous. It flies in the face of 220 years of election law. We have an electoral college; it was put there for a reason."

=== Committee assignments ===
- Agriculture
- Budget and Fiscal Review
- Elections and Constitutional Amendments (Vice Chair)
- Governance and Finance
- Natural Resources and Water (Vice Chair)
- Veterans Affairs
- Joint Committee on Legislative Audit
- Joint Committee on Fairs, Allocation, and Classification (Chair)
- Joint Committee on Fisheries and Aquaculture

== U.S. House of Representatives ==
=== Elections ===
==== 2012 ====
In January 2012, 2nd district congressman Wally Herger announced that he was retiring after 13 terms. Hours after his announcement, Republican consultant Dave Gilliard told Flash Report that Herger had endorsed LaMalfa as his successor. Herger's district was renumbered the 1st in the 2010 round of redistricting. LaMalfa's state senate district was largely coextensive with the western portion of the congressional district.

LaMalfa finished first in the June 2012 Republican primary election with 38% of the vote in an eight-person race, winning 10 of the district's 11 counties.

On November 6, 2012, LaMalfa defeated Democratic Party nominee Jim Reed 57%–43%.

==== 2014 ====
LaMalfa defeated Democratic nominee Heidi Hall in the general election with 61% of the vote.

==== 2016 ====
In the 2016 general election, LaMalfa defeated Democratic nominee Jim Reed with 59.1% of the vote.

==== 2018 ====
There were many candidates in the primary contest, including four candidates expressing preference for the Democratic party, two candidates expressing preference for the Republican party (including LaMalfa), and one candidate expressing preference for the Green Party of the United States. LaMalfa and Audrey Denney (who preferred the Democratic party) were the top two candidates in the primary, earning 51.7% and 17.9% of the vote, respectively.

During the general election, LaMalfa's campaign sent out an attack mailer showing a falsified picture of Denney signing a document endorsing Nancy Pelosi and liberal Democrats. In February 2018, Denney uploaded the original photograph to her campaign website; it showed her signing a promise to oppose campaign contributions from the petroleum industry. LaMalfa's campaign altered the wording on the document in its mailer.

LaMalfa defeated Denney in the November 6 general election, with 54.9% of the 291,594 votes cast to Denney's 45.1%.

==== 2020 ====
LaMalfa defeated Denney in a general-election rematch with 57.0% of the vote to her 43.0%.

==== 2022 ====
LaMalfa defeated Max Steiner, who described himself as a "moderate Democrat", with 62.1% of the 246,225 votes cast to Steiner's 37.9%. During the campaign, Steiner attacked LaMalfa's support for election fraud claims and his vote against certifying President Joe Biden's victory in the 2020 presidential election.

In the 2022 race, 63% of LaMalfa's campaign contributions came from inside his state, with 25% coming from inside his district.

==== 2024 ====
LaMalfa defeated Democratic candidate Rose Penelope Yee with 65.3% of the vote.

=== Committee assignments ===
For the 119th Congress:

- Committee on Agriculture
  - Subcommittee on Forestry and Horticulture (Chair)
  - Subcommittee on General Farm Commodities, Risk Management, and Credit
- Committee on Natural Resources
  - Subcommittee on Indian and Insular Affairs
  - Subcommittee on Water, Wildlife and Fisheries
- Committee on Transportation and Infrastructure
  - Subcommittee on Highways and Transit
  - Subcommittee on Railroads, Pipelines, and Hazardous Materials
  - Subcommittee on Water Resources and Environment

=== Caucus memberships ===
- Congressional Western Caucus
- Republican Study Committee
- U.S.–Japan Caucus
- Congressional Coalition on Adoption

== Political positions ==
LaMalfa had a conservative voting record. During the 117th Congress, LaMalfa's voting record was in line with Joe Biden's stated position only 11.6% of the time.

=== Abortion ===
LaMalfa supported the overturning of Roe v. Wade. He called Roe v. Wade "partisan" and said it "does not represent the values of our country". LaMalfa voted in favor of the Born-Alive Abortion Survivors Protection Act. As of the 118th Congress, LaMalfa was given the rating of A+ by the Susan B. Anthony Pro-Life America.

=== Bipartisanship ===
LaMalfa was known for using State of the Union addresses to get one-on-one moments with presidents, regardless of political party, and make requests. After other Republican members of Congress loudly jeered Joe Biden's 2024 State of the Union address, LaMalfa had a three-minute conversation on the House floor with him. He was also known, according to The Washington Post, as an "affable, approachable and pragmatic lawmaker".

=== Climate change ===
LaMalfa said in 2012: "The climate of the globe has been fluctuating since God created it", and that the Book of Genesis disproves the scientific consensus on climate change, which he called "bad science". In 2017, he said, "I don't buy the idea that man-made activity is responsible." In 2018, amid wildfires, LaMalfa said, "I'm not going to quibble here today about whether it's man, or sunspot activity, or magma causing ice shelves to melt." He suggested the wildfires were due to poor land management by state and federal agencies.

LaMalfa's February 2024 claim that CO_{2} cannot cause climate change—because it is only 0.04% of the atmosphere—was soon fact-checked as false and misleading, given the scientifically known strong effect of even small concentrations of that greenhouse gas on climate.

=== Donald Trump ===
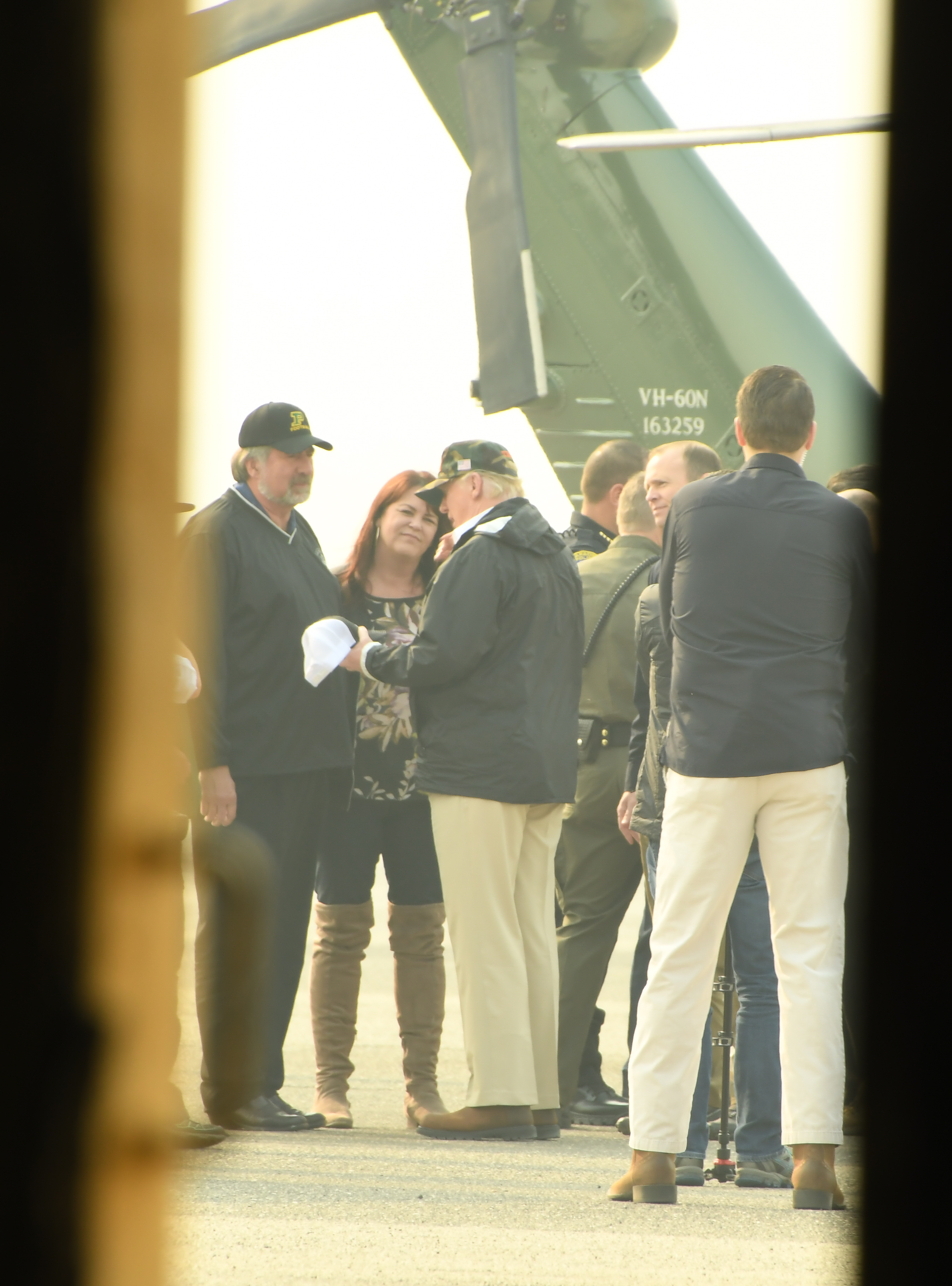
LaMalfa (far left) with President Donald Trump (center) in November 2018

During President Donald Trump's first impeachment, LaMalfa voted against impeachment, believing that Trump did not do anything that warranted impeachment, including during his phone call with Ukrainian president Volodymyr Zelenskyy.

After Trump lost the 2020 presidential election to Joe Biden and refused to concede, LaMalfa claimed that "the circumstances surrounding this presidential election point to a fraudulent outcome". In December 2020, LaMalfa was one of 126 Republican members of the House of Representatives who signed an amicus curiae brief in support of Texas v. Pennsylvania, a lawsuit filed at the United States Supreme Court contesting the results of the 2020 election. The Supreme Court declined to hear the case on the basis that Texas lacked standing under Article III of the Constitution to challenge the results of an election held by another state.

House speaker Nancy Pelosi issued a statement that called signing the amicus brief an act of "election subversion."

On January 7, 2021, following the attack on the U.S. Capitol building by Trump supporters, LaMalfa and six other California representatives voted to reject the certification of Arizona's and Pennsylvania's electoral votes in the 2020 presidential election.

=== Race ===
After the 2017 Unite the Right rally in Charlottesville, Virginia, LaMalfa released a statement saying, "Of course it's awful. We've fought and won wars against this hateful ideology, and it has no place in our country."

After the passing of a defense spending bill with a provision aiming to weed out white supremacy from military and federal law enforcement, LaMalfa expressed concerns that it would turn into a witch hunt and that racism would always exist. He also said it is not Congress's job to deal with racism in the government.

In June 2021, LaMalfa was one of 14 House Republicans to vote against legislation to establish Juneteenth, a celebration of the end of slavery, as a federal holiday. The House passed the resolution with a vote of 415–14, while it passed in the Senate 100–0.

=== Farming ===
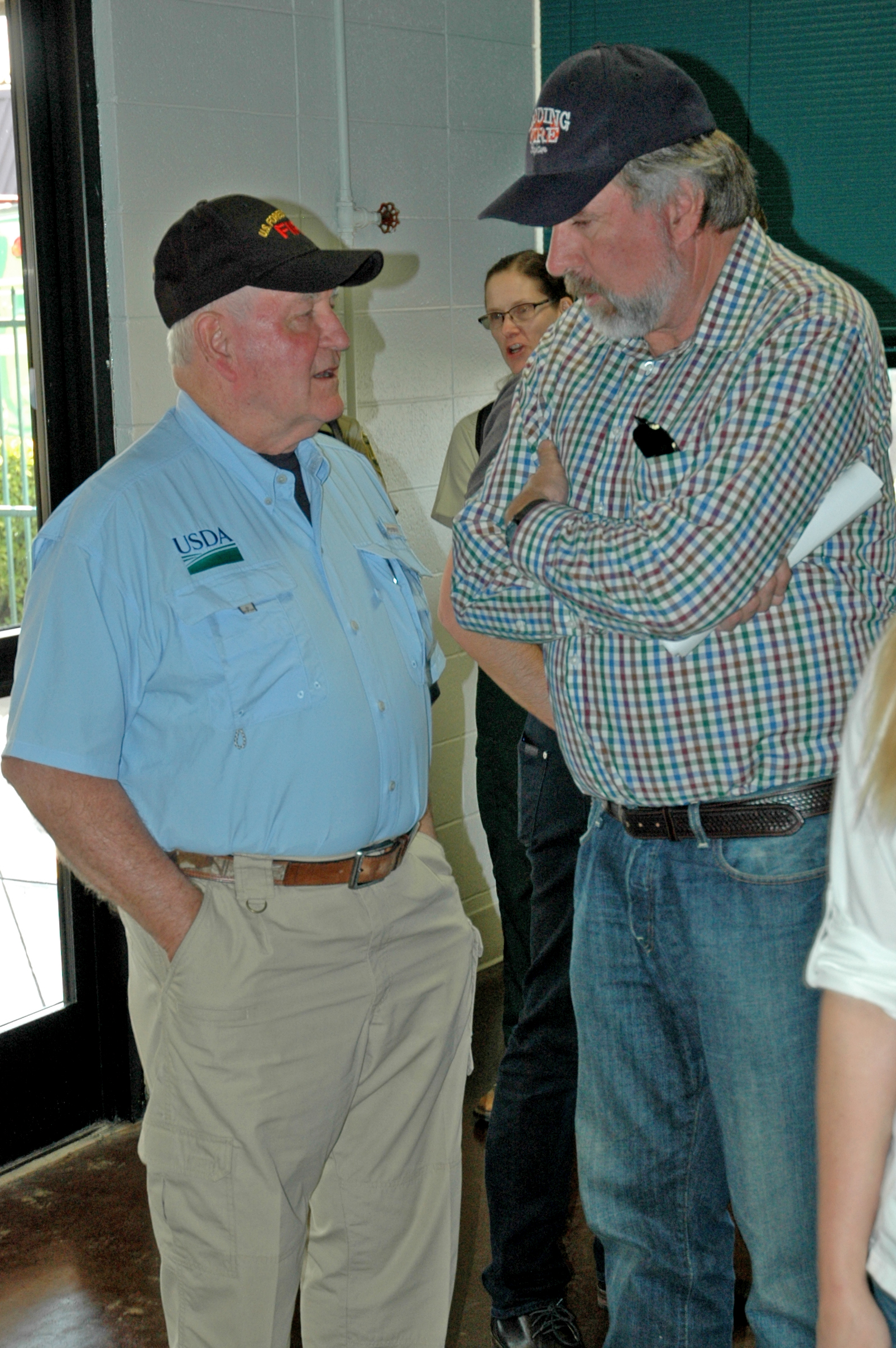
LaMalfa (right) with U.S. Secretary of Agriculture Sonny Perdue (left), August 2018

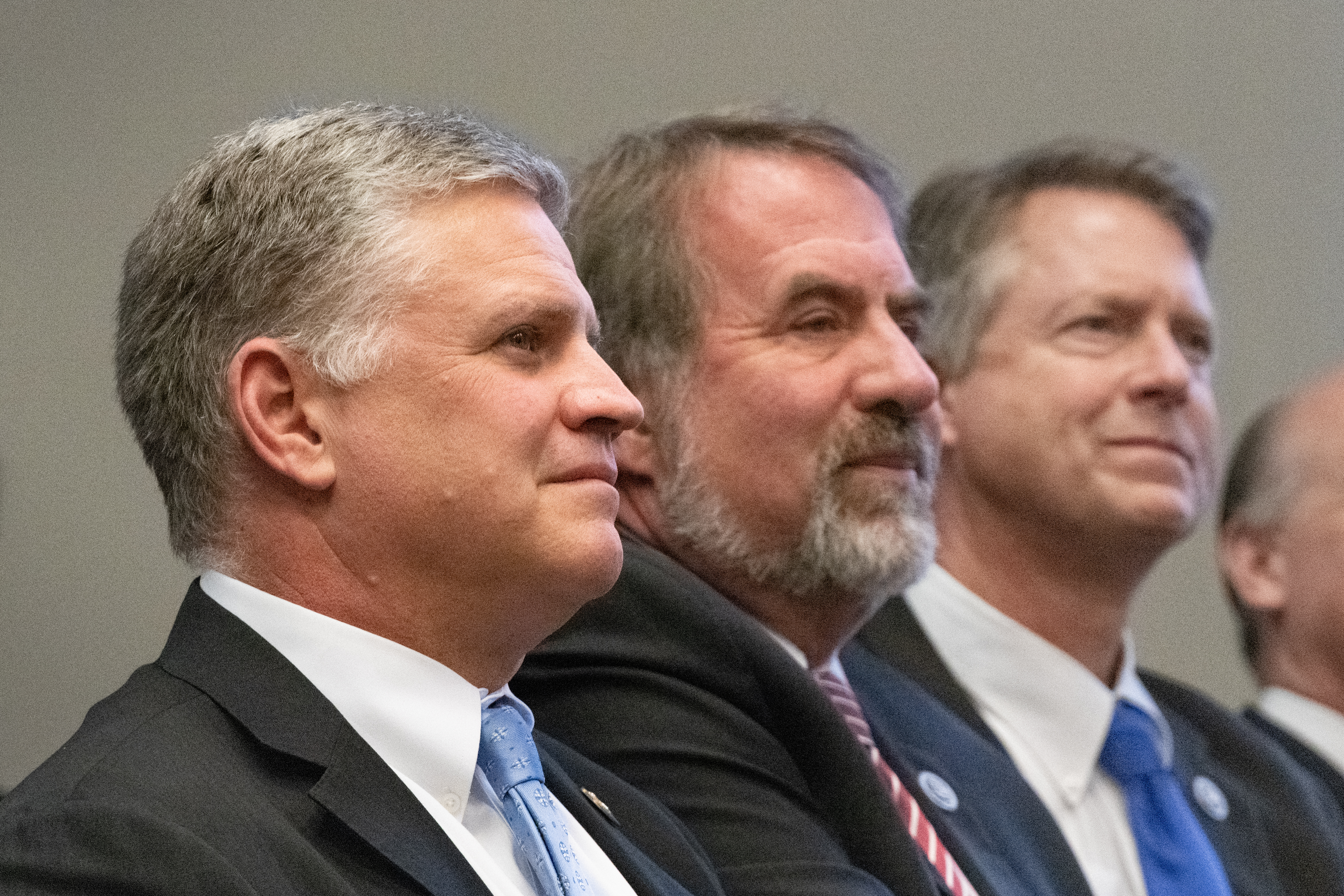
LaMalfa (center) looking on with fellow Representatives Drew Ferguson (left) and Roger Marshall (right) in an agriculture meeting, December 2018

From 1995 to 2016, LaMalfa's own farm received the largest amount of public assistance money from agricultural subsidies (over $1.7 million) in the history of Congress. As a member of the House Agricultural Committee, LaMalfa oversaw farm subsidies, presenting a conflict of interest. In 2017, his spokesman, Parker Williams, said that LaMalfa "voted to end direct farm subsidy payments in the very first farm bill he worked on" and that a new farm bill proposed does not provide subsidies for rice grown in California, a crop that LaMalfa farms. He supported the 2020–2021 Indian farmers' protest.

=== LGBT rights ===
LaMalfa opposed same-sex marriage and believed that legalizing it would "open the floodgates" for polygamy to be legalized. He also stated that marriage is "an institution created by God and supposed to be held up and respected by men and women". He endorsed the First Amendment Defense Act, which he said would "protect the nonprofit status of religious institutions if the federal government tried to compel them to act against their faith". In 2015, LaMalfa co-sponsored a resolution to amend the Constitution to ban same-sex marriage. LaMalfa voted against the Equality Act (which would amend the Civil Rights Act of 1964 to ban discrimination against LGBT people and against women within employment, housing, public accommodations, education, federal programs, banking, and jury service as well as strengthen protections for ethnic minorities) in both the 116th Congress and the 117th Congress. On July 19, 2022, he voted against the Respect for Marriage Act, a bill that would protect the right to same-sex marriage at a federal level.

=== Voter fraud ===
LaMalfa once said, "California is just a sieve on its voter security." Speaking about his own district, he said, "There's a percentage of illegal votes, probably in every district. Is it high here? Probably not. We don't really have the demographics that would be a really big push of that."

=== Taxes ===
LaMalfa voted in favor of the Tax Cuts and Jobs Act of 2017. According to him, the bill would enable his constituents to save more money and give them tax relief. He said that the bill will give a "booster shot to the U.S. economy", enable businesses to hire more workers, and cause more products to be made in the USA, especially in Redding.

=== Colleagues ===
In November 2021, after Representative Paul Gosar shared an animated video of himself killing Representative Alexandria Ocasio-Cortez and attacking President Biden, LaMalfa voted against Gosar's censure.

In December 2023, LaMalfa voted against the expulsion of George Santos, stating that while he believed Santos should resign, he did not want to set a bad precedent by expelling a representative who had not committed treason or been convicted of a crime.

=== Defense ===
In September 2021, LaMalfa was among 75 House Republicans to vote against the National Defense Authorization Act of 2022, which contained a provision that would require women to be drafted.

=== Immigration ===
LaMalfa sponsored H.R. 6202, the American Tech Workforce Act of 2021, introduced by Representative Jim Banks. The legislation would establish a wage floor for the high-skill H-1B visa program, thereby significantly reducing employer dependence on the program. The bill would also eliminate the Optional Practical Training program that allows foreign graduates to stay and work in the United States.

=== Ukraine ===
In August 2023, LaMalfa was the sole California Republican to vote in favor of Amendment 22 of H.R. 2670, the National Defense Authorization Act for Fiscal Year 2024, to prohibit all security assistance to Ukraine. Additionally LaMalfa was the only California Republican to vote for Amendment 21 to cancel $300 million of assistance for Ukraine.

== Personal life ==
LaMalfa and his wife, Jill, had four children. LaMalfa commuted weekly from California to Washington, D.C. He was an owner and manager of the DSL LaMalfa Family Partnership, which owns and operates the family rice farm in Richvale, California. LaMalfa employed a farm manager who ran the farm while he was working in Washington.

He was a Protestant.

=== Death ===
On January 5, 2026, LaMalfa was hospitalized after experiencing a medical emergency at his home in Richvale. He was transported to Chico, California, where he underwent emergency surgery for an aortic aneurysm. He died at 3:20 a.m. PST on January 6 while still in surgery from a heart attack as a complication of an aortic dissection and cardiomegaly, at the age of 65.

== Electoral history ==
Electoral history of Doug LaMalfa
Year	Office		Party	Primary			General			Ref.
Year	Office		Party	Total	%	P.	Total	%	Result	Ref.
2002	State Assembly	2nd	Republican	32,004	58.80%	1st	79,361	67.40%	Won	
2004	State Assembly	2nd	Republican	54,574	100.0%	1st	115,651	64.87%	Won	
2006	State Assembly	2nd	Republican	49,877	100.0%	1st	95,723	68.10%	Won	
2010	State Senate	4th	Republican	72,742	57.80%	1st	226,239	68.30%	Won	
2012	U.S. House	1st	Republican	66,527	37.93%	1st	168,827	57.38%	Won	
2014	U.S. House	1st	Republican	75,317	53.45%	1st	132,052	61.03%	Won	
2016	U.S. House	1st	Republican	86,136	40.79%	1st	185,448	59.05%	Won	
2018	U.S. House	1st	Republican	98,354	51.66%	1st	160,046	54.89%	Won	
2020	U.S. House	1st	Republican	128,613	54.64%	1st	204,190	56.99%	Won	
2022	U.S. House	1st	Republican	96,858	57.11%	1st	152,839	62.07%	Won	
2024	U.S. House	1st	Republican	122,858	66.68%	1st	208,592	65.3%	Won	

== See also ==
- List of members of the United States Congress who died in office (2000–present)

U.S. House of Representatives
Preceded by Mike Thompson	Member of the U.S. House of Representatives from California's 1st congressional district 2013–2026	Succeeded by James Gallagher
