= 2004 United States House of Representatives elections in California =

- November 2, 2004

All 53 California seats to the United States House of Representatives
	Majority party	Minority party
Party	Democratic	Republican
Last election	33	20
Seats won	33	20
Seat change	Steady	Steady
Popular vote	6,223,698	5,030,821
Percentage	53.54%	43.28%
Swing	▲2.26%	▼1.86%

Democratic hold
Republican hold
Democratic
50–60%
60–70%
70–80%
80–90%
Republican
50–60%
60–70%
70–80%
80–90%

The United States House of Representatives elections in California, 2004 was an election for California's delegation to the United States House of Representatives, which occurred as part of the general election of the House of Representatives on November 2, 2004. The districts after the 2000 census were gerrymandered to protect incumbents of both parties, so there was no change in the party balance, 33 Democrats and 20 Republicans.

== Overview ==
United States HoR elections in California, 2004
Party	Votes	%	Seats
Democratic	6,223,698	53.54%	33
Republican	5,030,821	43.28%	20
Green	205,278	1.77%	0
Libertarian	111,031	0.96%	0
Peace and Freedom	39,211	0.34%	0
American Independent	8,163	0.07%	0
Write-in	5,551	0.05%	0
Totals	11,623,753	100.00%	53

== Results ==
The following are the final results from the Secretary of State of California.

== District 1 ==
2004 California's 1st congressional district election
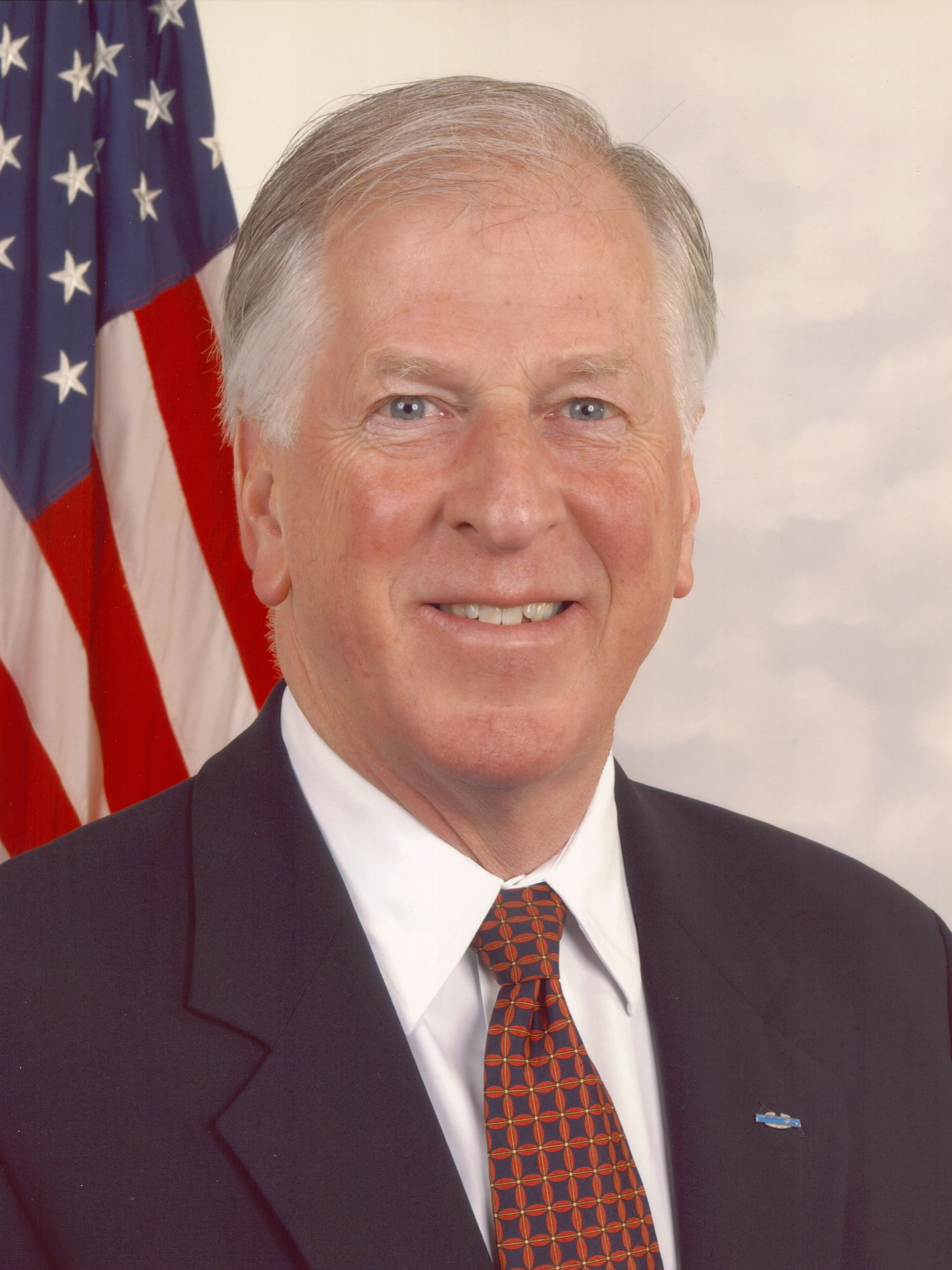

Nominee	Mike Thompson	Lawrence R. Wiesner
Party	Democratic	Republican
Popular vote	189,366	79,970
Percentage	66.9%	28.3%
- County results Thompson: 50–60% 60–70%
U.S. Representative before election
Mike Thompson
Democratic
Elected U.S. Representative
Mike Thompson
Democratic

=== Predictions ===
Source	Ranking	As of
The Cook Political Report	Safe D	October 29, 2004
Sabato's Crystal Ball	Safe D	November 1, 2004

=== Results ===
California's 1st congressional district election, 2004
Party	Candidate	Votes	%
Democratic	Mike Thompson (incumbent)	189,366	66.92
Republican	Lawrence R. Wiesner	79,970	28.26
Green	Pamela Elizondo	13,635	4.82
Total votes		282,971	100.00
Turnout			
Democratic hold			

== District 2 ==
2004 California's 2nd congressional district election
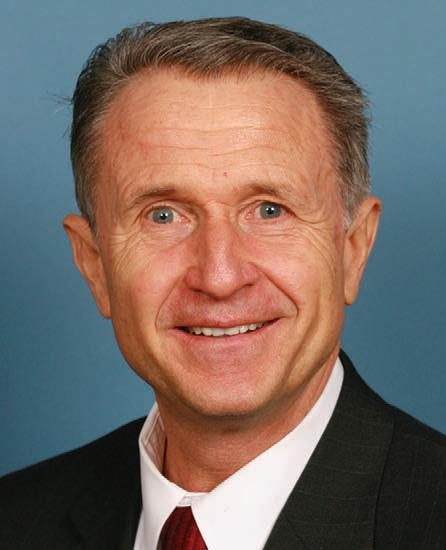

Nominee	Wally Herger	Mike Johnson
Party	Republican	Democratic
Popular vote	182,119	90,310
Percentage	66.8%	33.1%
- County results Herger: 50–60% 60–70% 70–80%
U.S. Representative before election
Wally Herger
Republican
Elected U.S. Representative
Wally Herger
Republican

=== Predictions ===
Source	Ranking	As of
The Cook Political Report	Safe R	October 29, 2004
Sabato's Crystal Ball	Safe R	November 1, 2004

=== Results ===
California's 2nd congressional district election, 2004
Party	Candidate	Votes	%
Republican	Wally Herger (incumbent)	182,119	66.85
Democratic	Mike Johnson	90,310	33.15
Total votes		272,429	100.00
Turnout			
Republican hold			

== District 3 ==
2004 California's 3rd congressional district election
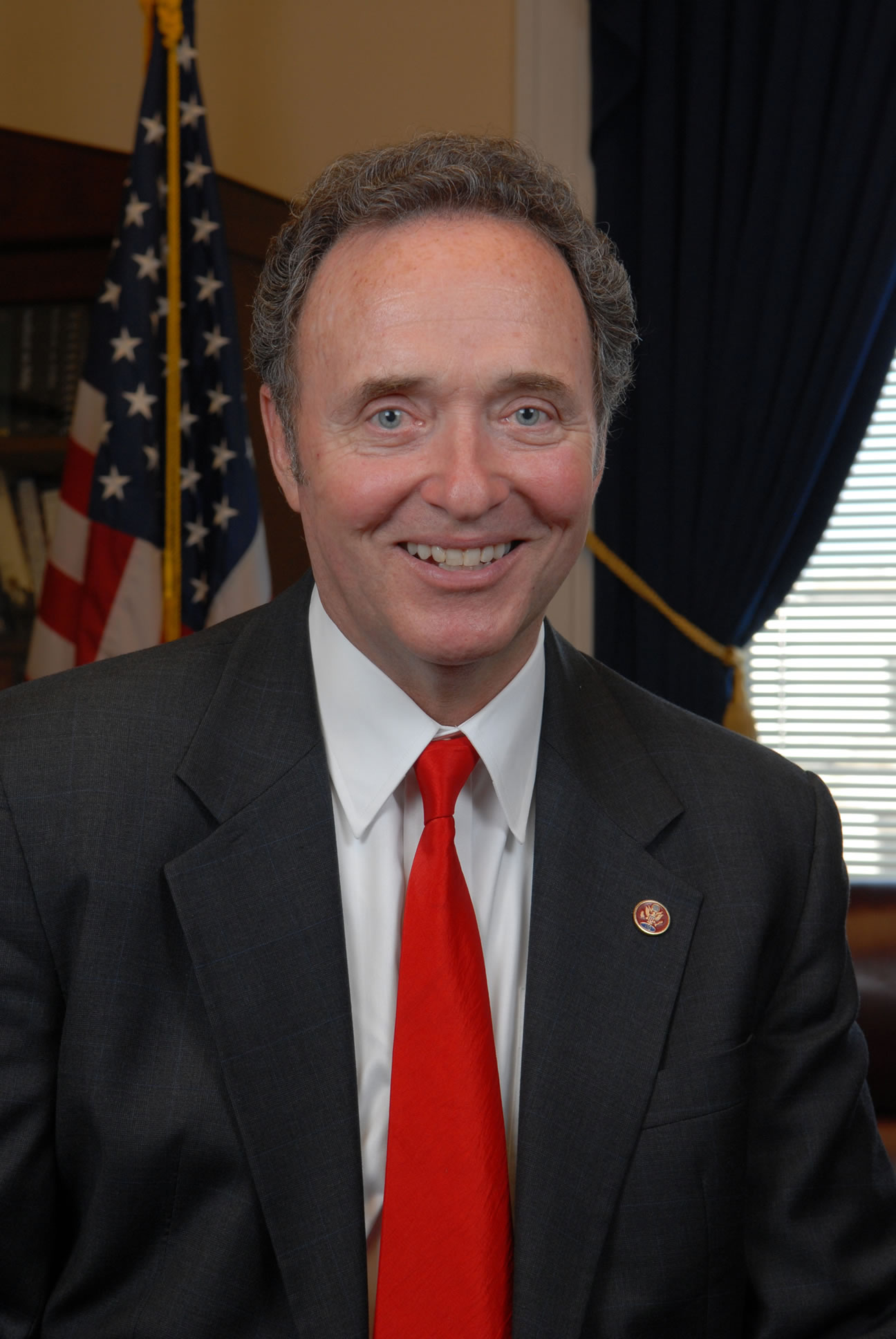

Nominee	Dan Lungren	Gabe Castillo
Party	Republican	Democratic
Popular vote	177,738	100,025
Percentage	61.9%	34.8%
- County results Lungren: 50–60% 60–70%
U.S. Representative before election
Doug Ose
Republican
Elected U.S. Representative
Dan Lungren
Republican

=== Predictions ===
Source	Ranking	As of
The Cook Political Report	Safe R	October 29, 2004
Sabato's Crystal Ball	Safe R	November 1, 2004

=== Results ===
California's 3rd congressional district election, 2004
Party	Candidate	Votes	%
Republican	Dan Lungren	177,738	61.92
Democratic	Gabe Castillo	100,025	34.84
Libertarian	Douglas Arthur Tuma	9,310	3.24
Total votes		287,063	100.00
Turnout			
Republican hold			

== District 4 ==
2004 California's 4th congressional district election
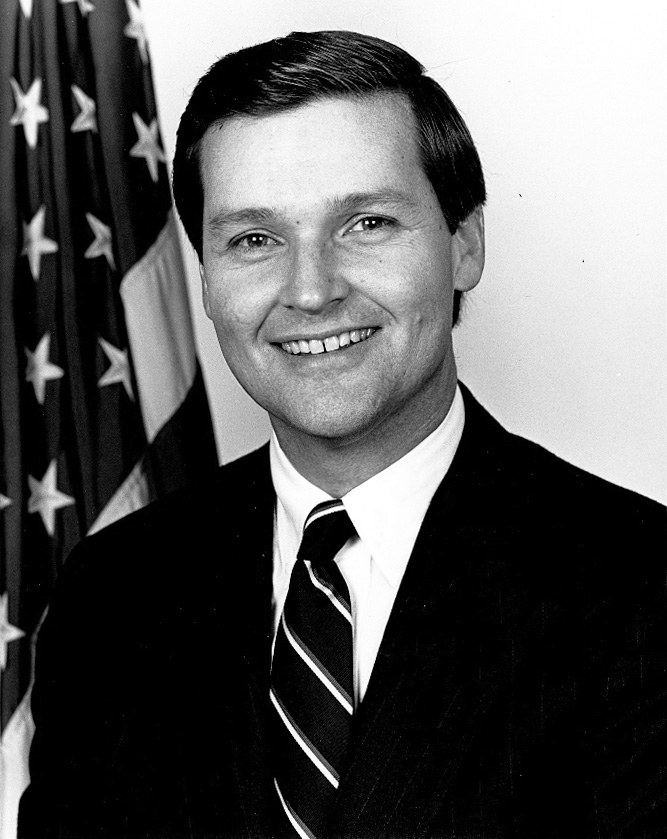

Nominee	John Doolittle	David I. Winters
Party	Republican	Democratic
Popular vote	221,926	117,743
Percentage	65.4%	34.7%
- County results Doolittle: 50–60% 60–70% 70–80%
U.S. Representative before election
John Doolittle
Republican
Elected U.S. Representative
John Doolittle
Republican

=== Predictions ===
Source	Ranking	As of
The Cook Political Report	Safe R	October 29, 2004
Sabato's Crystal Ball	Safe R	November 1, 2004

=== Results ===
California's 4th congressional district election, 2004
Party	Candidate	Votes	%
Republican	John Doolittle (incumbent)	221,926	65.39
Democratic	David I. Winters	117,743	34.69
Total votes		339,369	100.00
Turnout			
Republican hold			

== District 5 ==
2004 California's 5th congressional district election
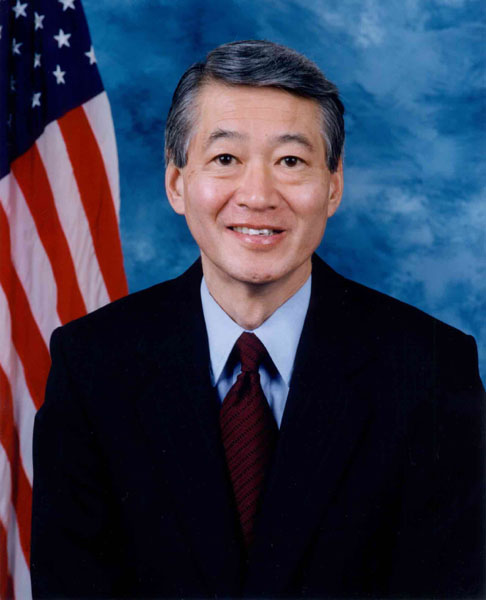
Nominee	Robert Matsui	Mike Dugas
Party	Democratic	Republican
Popular vote	138,004	45,120
Percentage	71.4%	23.3%
- County results Matsui: 70–80%
U.S. Representative before election
Robert Matsui
Democratic
Elected U.S. Representative
Robert Matsui
Democratic

=== Predictions ===
Source	Ranking	As of
The Cook Political Report	Safe D	October 29, 2004
Sabato's Crystal Ball	Safe D	November 1, 2004

=== Results ===
California's 5th congressional district election, 2004
Party	Candidate	Votes	%
Democratic	Robert Matsui (incumbent)	138,004	71.36
Republican	Mike Dugas	45,120	23.33
Green	Pat Driscoll	6,593	3.41
Peace and Freedom	John C. Reiger	3,670	1.90
Total votes		193,387	100.00
Turnout			
Democratic hold			

== District 6 ==
2004 California's 6th congressional district election
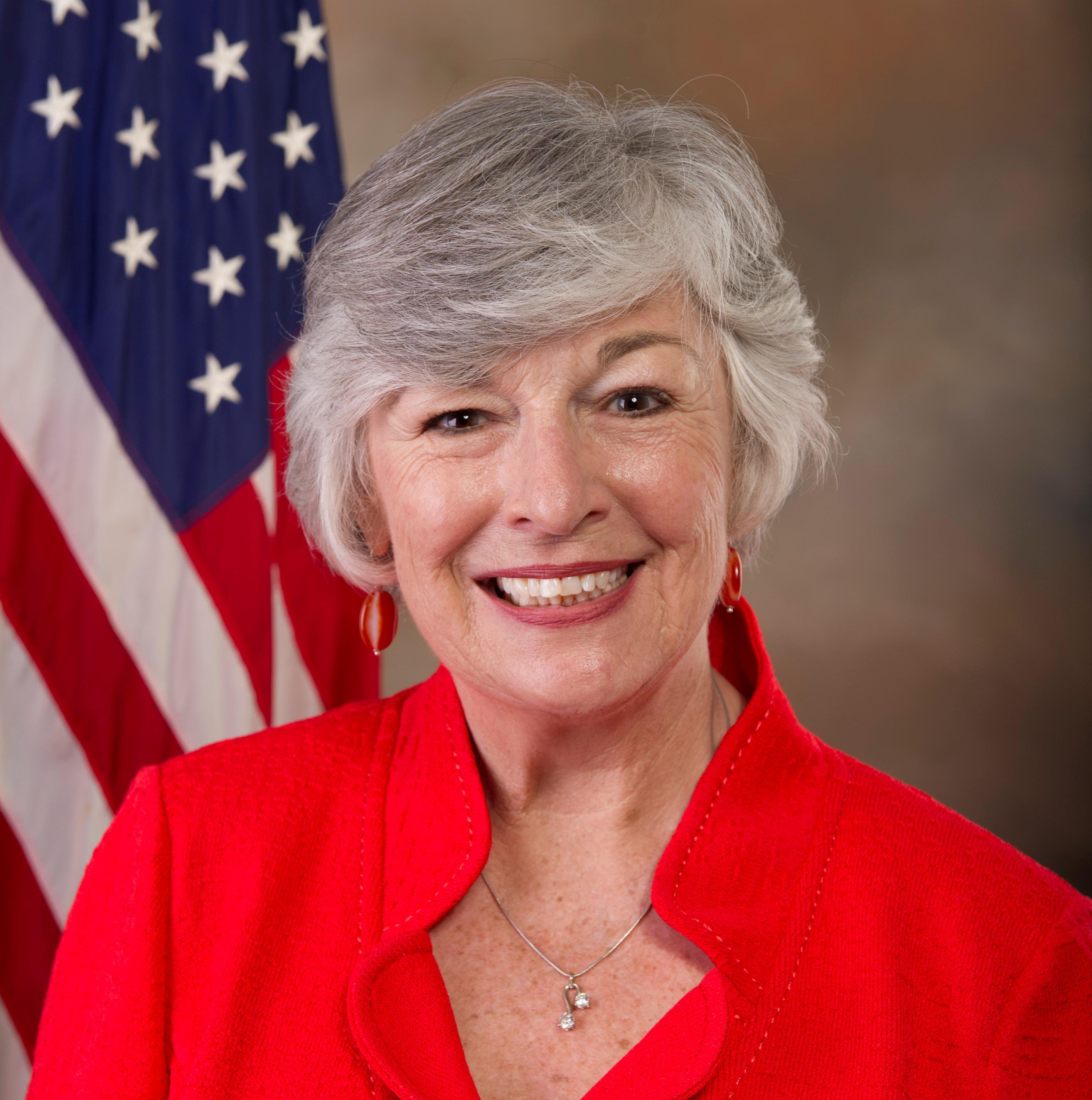

Nominee	Lynn Woolsey	Paul L. Erickson
Party	Democratic	Republican
Popular vote	226,423	85,244
Percentage	72.7%	27.4%
- County results Woolsey: 70–80%
U.S. Representative before election
Lynn Woolsey
Democratic
Elected U.S. Representative
Lynn Woolsey
Democratic

=== Predictions ===
Source	Ranking	As of
The Cook Political Report	Safe D	October 29, 2004
Sabato's Crystal Ball	Safe D	November 1, 2004

=== Results ===
California's 6th congressional district election, 2004
Party	Candidate	Votes	%
Democratic	Lynn Woolsey (incumbent)	226,423	72.65
Republican	Paul L. Erickson	85,244	27.35
Total votes		311,667	100.00
Turnout			
Democratic hold			

== District 7 ==
2004 California's 7th congressional district election
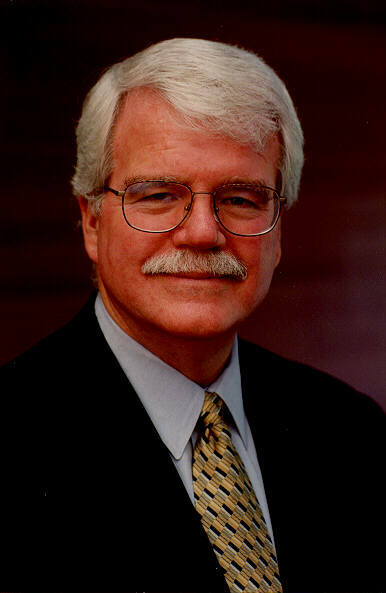

Nominee	George Miller	Charles Hargrave
Party	Democratic	Republican
Popular vote	166,831	52,446
Percentage	76.1%	23.9%
- County results Miller: 60–70% 80–90%
U.S. Representative before election
George Miller
Democratic
Elected U.S. Representative
George Miller
Democratic

=== Predictions ===
Source	Ranking	As of
The Cook Political Report	Safe D	October 29, 2004
Sabato's Crystal Ball	Safe D	November 1, 2004

=== Results ===
California's 7th congressional district election, 2004
Party	Candidate	Votes	%
Democratic	George Miller (incumbent)	166,831	76.08
Republican	Charles Hargrave	52,446	23.92
Total votes		219,277	100.00
Turnout			
Democratic hold			

== District 8 ==
2004 California's 8th congressional district election
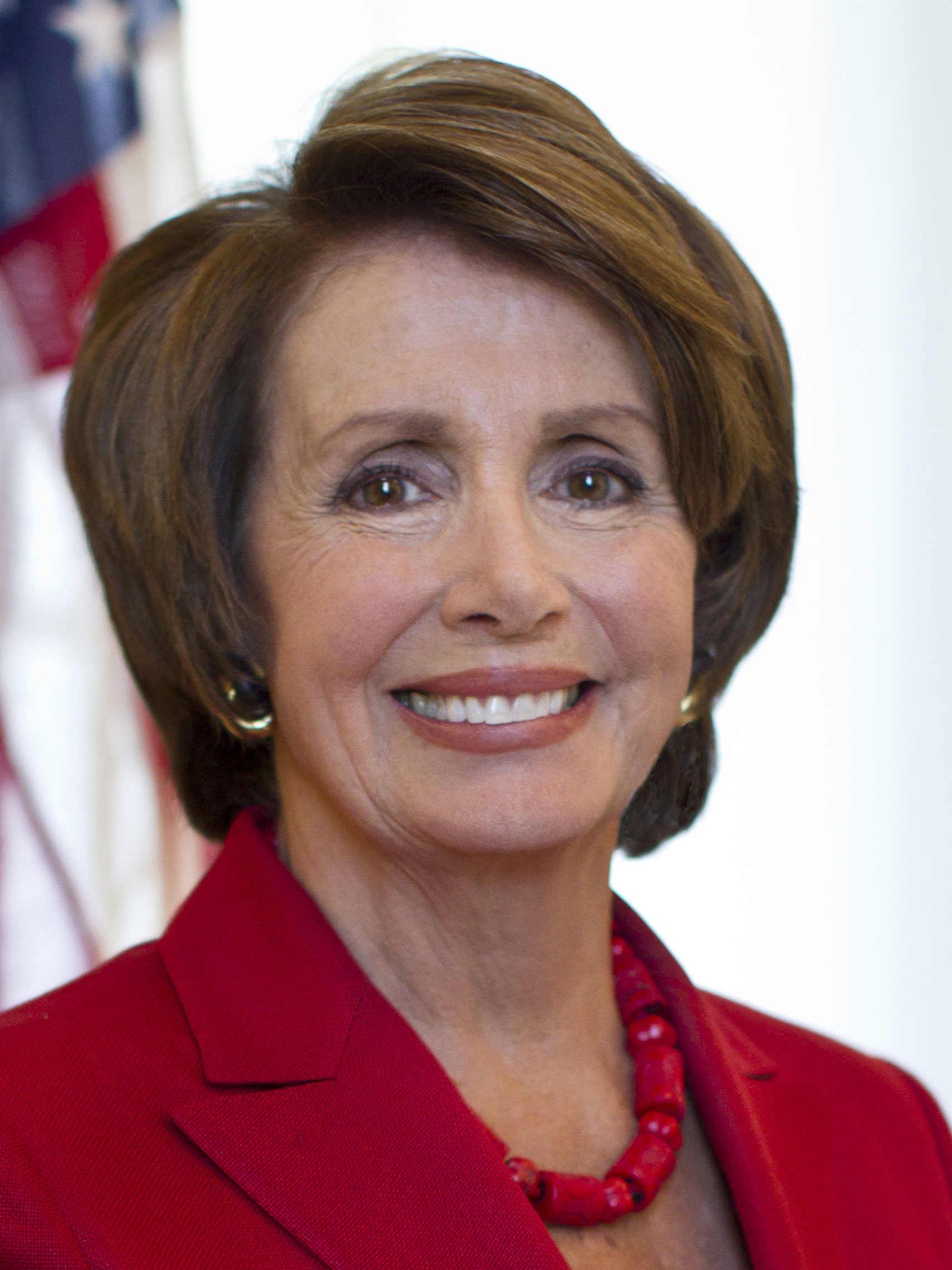

Nominee	Nancy Pelosi	Jennifer Depalma
Party	Democratic	Republican
Popular vote	224,017	31,074
Percentage	83.0%	11.5%
- County results Pelosi: 80–90%
U.S. Representative before election
Nancy Pelosi
Democratic
Elected U.S. Representative
Nancy Pelosi
Democratic

=== Predictions ===
Source	Ranking	As of
The Cook Political Report	Safe D	October 29, 2004
Sabato's Crystal Ball	Safe D	November 1, 2004

=== Results ===
California's 8th congressional district election, 2004
Party	Candidate	Votes	%
Democratic	Nancy Pelosi (incumbent)	224,017	82.95
Republican	Jennifer Depalma	31,074	11.51
Peace and Freedom	Leilani Dowell	9,527	3.53
No party	Terry Baum (write-in)	5,446	2.02
Total votes		270,064	100.00
Turnout			
Democratic hold			

== District 9 ==
2004 California's 9th congressional district election
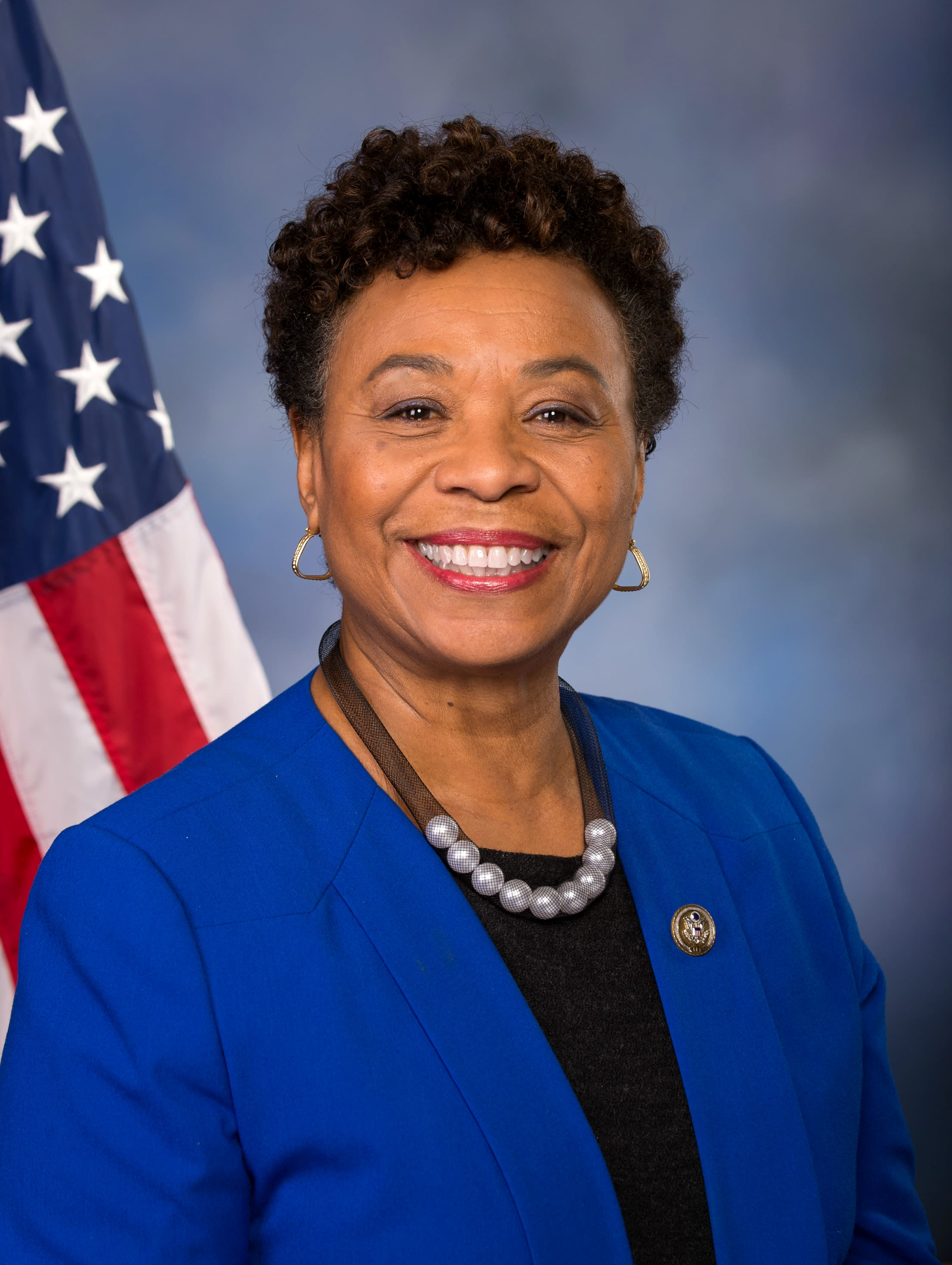

Nominee	Barbara Lee	Claudia Bermudez
Party	Democratic	Republican
Popular vote	215,630	31,278
Percentage	84.5%	12.3%
- County results Lee: 80–90%
U.S. Representative before election
Barbara Lee
Democratic
Elected U.S. Representative
Barbara Lee
Democratic

=== Predictions ===
Source	Ranking	As of
The Cook Political Report	Safe D	October 29, 2004
Sabato's Crystal Ball	Safe D	November 1, 2004

=== Results ===
California's 9th congressional district election, 2004
Party	Candidate	Votes	%
Democratic	Barbara Lee (incumbent)	215,630	84.55
Republican	Claudia Bermudez	31,278	12.26
Libertarian	Jim Eyer	8,131	3.19
Total votes		255,039	100.00
Turnout			
Democratic hold			

== District 10 ==
2004 California's 10th congressional district election
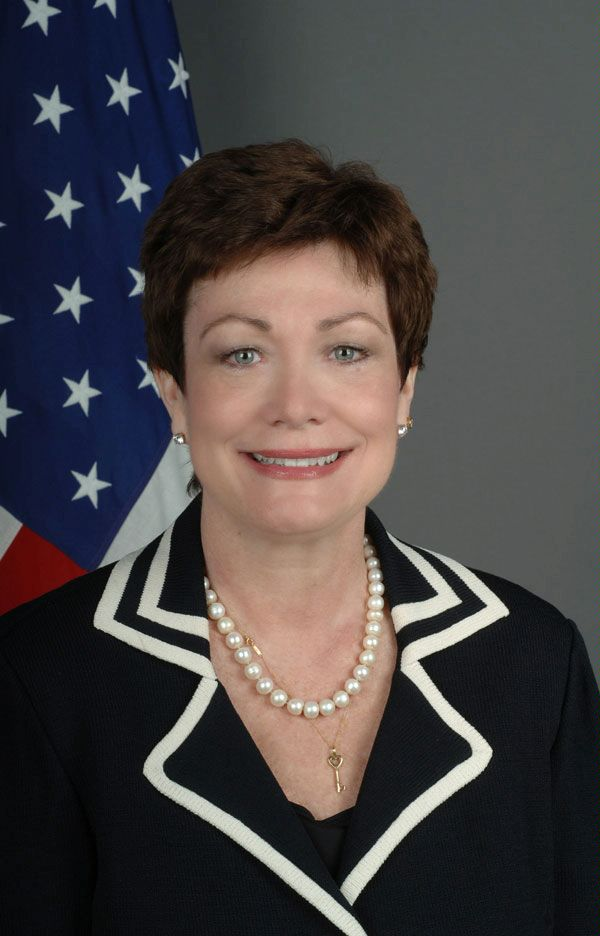

Nominee	Ellen Tauscher	Jeff Ketelson
Party	Democratic	Republican
Popular vote	182,750	95,349
Percentage	65.7%	34.3%
- County results Tauscher: 50–60% 60–70%
U.S. Representative before election
Ellen Tauscher
Democratic
Elected U.S. Representative
Ellen Tauscher
Democratic

=== Predictions ===
Source	Ranking	As of
The Cook Political Report	Safe D	October 29, 2004
Sabato's Crystal Ball	Safe D	November 1, 2004

=== Results ===
California's 10th congressional district election, 2004
Party	Candidate	Votes	%
Democratic	Ellen Tauscher (incumbent)	182,750	65.71
Republican	Jeff Ketelson	95,349	34.29
Total votes		278,099	100.00
Turnout			
Democratic hold			

== District 11 ==
2004 California's 11th congressional district election
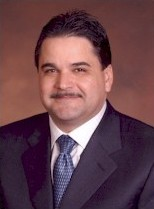

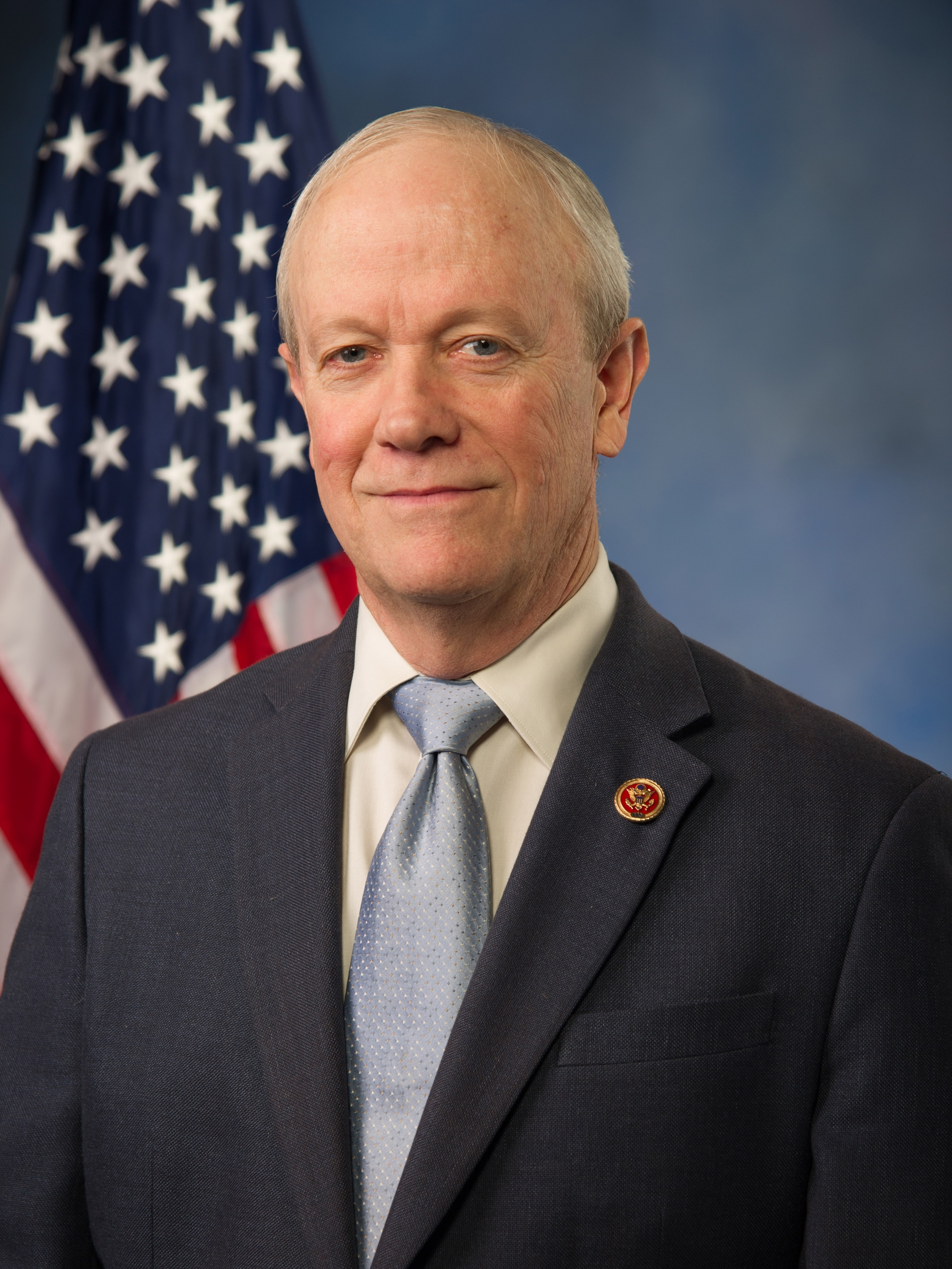
Nominee	Richard Pombo	Jerry McNerney
Party	Republican	Democratic
Popular vote	163,582	103,587
Percentage	61.2%	38.8%
- County results Pombo: 50–60% 60–70%
U.S. Representative before election
Richard Pombo
Republican
Elected U.S. Representative
Richard Pombo
Republican

=== Predictions ===
Source	Ranking	As of
The Cook Political Report	Safe R	October 29, 2004
Sabato's Crystal Ball	Safe R	November 1, 2004

=== Results ===
California's 11th congressional district election, 2004
Party	Candidate	Votes	%
Republican	Richard Pombo (incumbent)	163,582	61.23
Democratic	Jerry McNerney	103,587	38.77
Total votes		267,169	100.00
Turnout			
Republican hold			

== District 12 ==
2004 California's 12th congressional district election
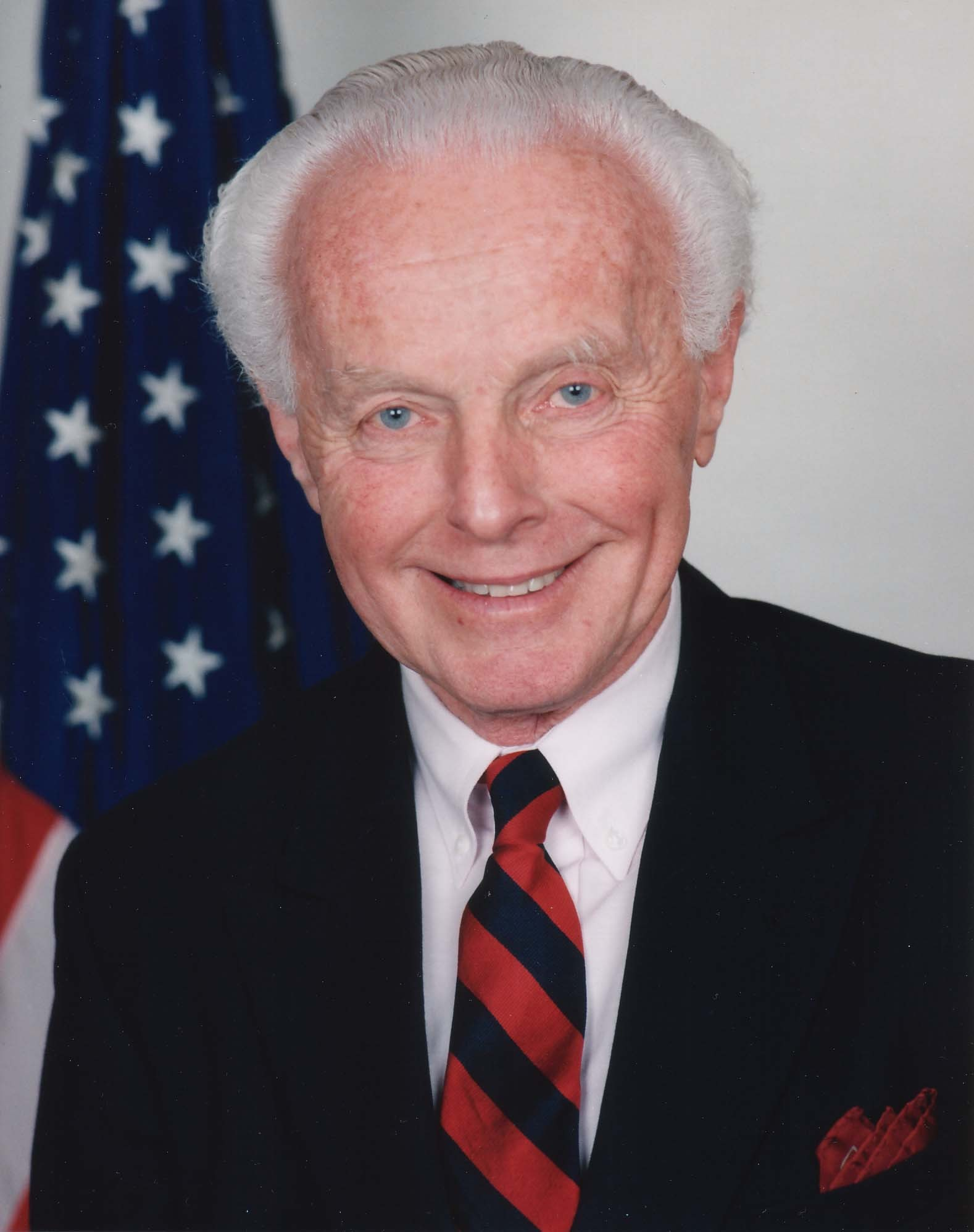

Nominee	Tom Lantos	Mike Garza	Pat Gray
Party	Democratic	Republican	Green
Popular vote	171,852	52,593	23,038
Percentage	68.0%	20.8%	9.1%
- County results Lantos: 60–70% 70–80%
U.S. Representative before election
Tom Lantos
Democratic
Elected U.S. Representative
Tom Lantos
Democratic

=== Predictions ===
Source	Ranking	As of
The Cook Political Report	Safe D	October 29, 2004
Sabato's Crystal Ball	Safe D	November 1, 2004

=== Results ===
California's 12th congressional district election, 2004
Party	Candidate	Votes	%
Democratic	Tom Lantos (incumbent)	171,852	68.03
Republican	Mike Garza	52,593	20.82
Green	Pat Gray	23,038	9.12
Libertarian	Harland Harrison	5,116	2.03
Total votes		252,599	100.00
Turnout			
Democratic hold			

== District 13 ==
2004 California's 13th congressional district election
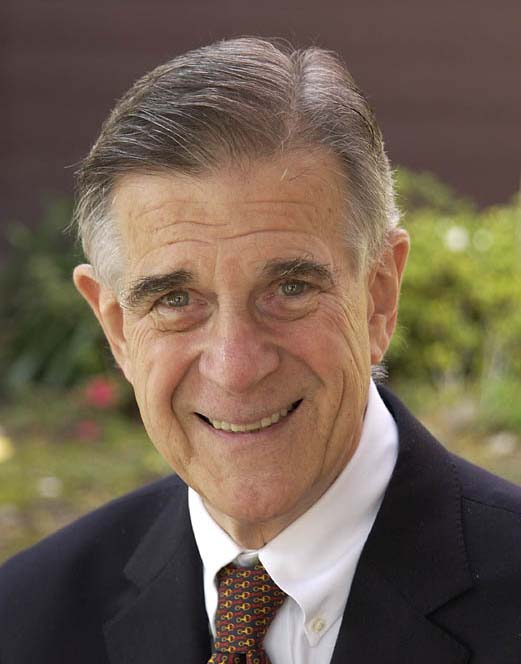

Nominee	Pete Stark	George I. Bruno
Party	Democratic	Republican
Popular vote	144,605	48,439
Percentage	71.6%	24.0%
- County results Stark: 70–80%
U.S. Representative before election
Pete Stark
Democratic
Elected U.S. Representative
Pete Stark
Democratic

=== Predictions ===
Source	Ranking	As of
The Cook Political Report	Safe D	October 29, 2004
Sabato's Crystal Ball	Safe D	November 1, 2004

=== Results ===
California's 13th congressional district election, 2004
Party	Candidate	Votes	%
Democratic	Pete Stark (incumbent)	144,605	71.61
Republican	George I. Bruno	48,439	23.99
Libertarian	Mark W. Stroberg	8,877	4.40
Total votes		201,921	100.00
Turnout			
Democratic hold			

== District 14 ==
2004 California's 14th congressional district election
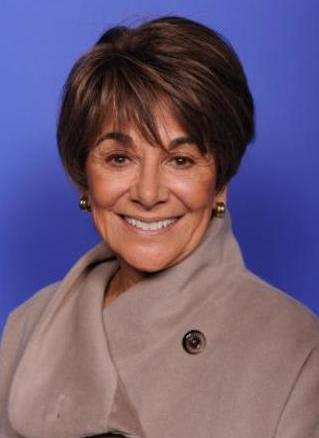

Nominee	Anna Eshoo	Chris Haugen
Party	Democratic	Republican
Popular vote	182,712	69,564
Percentage	69.8%	26.6%
- County results Eshoo: 60–70% 70–80%
U.S. Representative before election
Anna Eshoo
Democratic
Elected U.S. Representative
Anna Eshoo
Democratic

=== Predictions ===
Source	Ranking	As of
The Cook Political Report	Safe D	October 29, 2004
Sabato's Crystal Ball	Safe D	November 1, 2004

=== Results ===
California's 14th congressional district election, 2004
Party	Candidate	Votes	%
Democratic	Anna Eshoo (incumbent)	182,712	69.77
Republican	Chris Haugen	69,564	26.56
Libertarian	Brian Holtz	9,588	3.66
No party	Dennis Mitrzyk (write-in)	24	0.01
Total votes		261,888	100.00
Turnout			
Democratic hold			

== District 15 ==
2004 California's 15th congressional district election
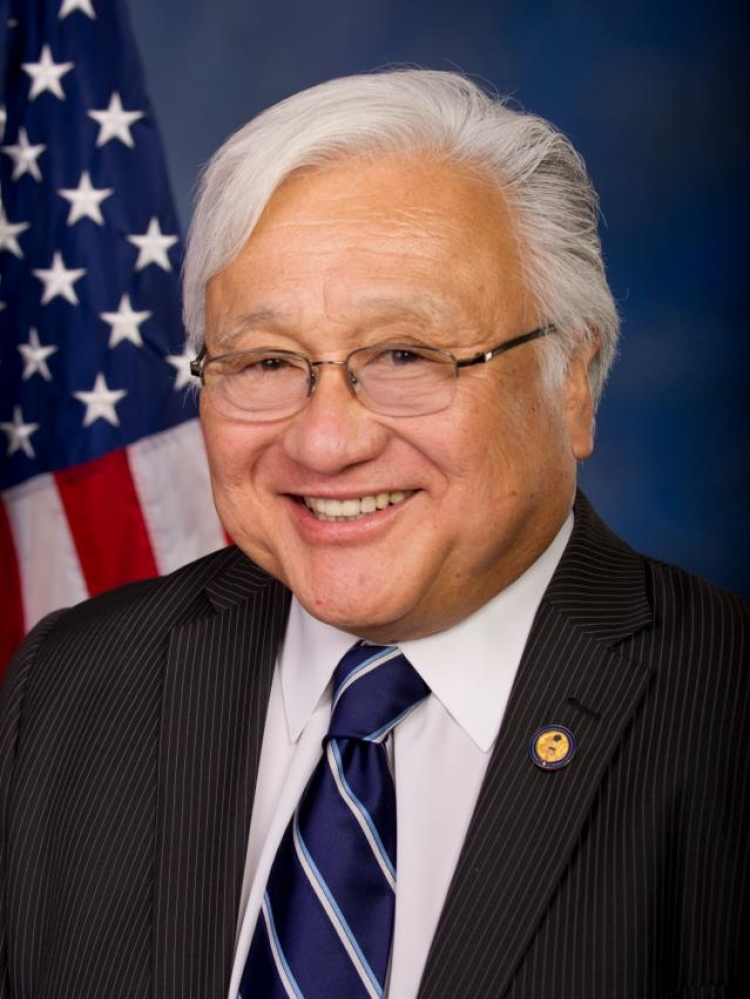

Nominee	Mike Honda	Raymond L. Chukwu
Party	Democratic	Republican
Popular vote	154,385	59,953
Percentage	72.0%	28.0%
- County results Honda: 70–80%
U.S. Representative before election
Mike Honda
Democratic
Elected U.S. Representative
Mike Honda
Democratic

=== Predictions ===
Source	Ranking	As of
The Cook Political Report	Safe D	October 29, 2004
Sabato's Crystal Ball	Safe D	November 1, 2004

=== Results ===
California's 15th congressional district election, 2004
Party	Candidate	Votes	%
Democratic	Mike Honda (incumbent)	154,385	72.03
Republican	Raymond L. Chukwu	59,953	27.97
Total votes		214,338	100.00
Turnout			
Democratic hold			

== District 16 ==
2004 California's 16th congressional district election
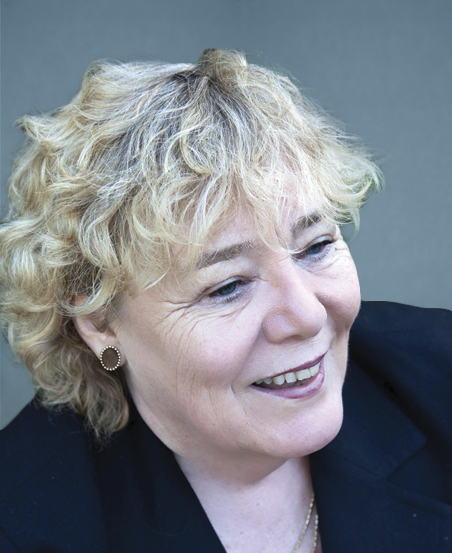

Nominee	Zoe Lofgren	Douglas Adams McNea
Party	Democratic	Republican
Popular vote	129,222	47,992
Percentage	70.9%	26.3%
- County results Lofgren: 70–80%
U.S. Representative before election
Zoe Lofgren
Democratic
Elected U.S. Representative
Zoe Lofgren
Democratic

=== Predictions ===
Source	Ranking	As of
The Cook Political Report	Safe D	October 29, 2004
Sabato's Crystal Ball	Safe D	November 1, 2004

=== Results ===
California's 16th congressional district election, 2004
Party	Candidate	Votes	%
Democratic	Zoe Lofgren (incumbent)	129,222	70.89
Republican	Douglas Adams McNea	47,992	26.33
Libertarian	Markus Welch	5,067	2.78
Total votes		182,281	100.00
Turnout			
Democratic hold			

== District 17 ==
2004 California's 17th congressional district election
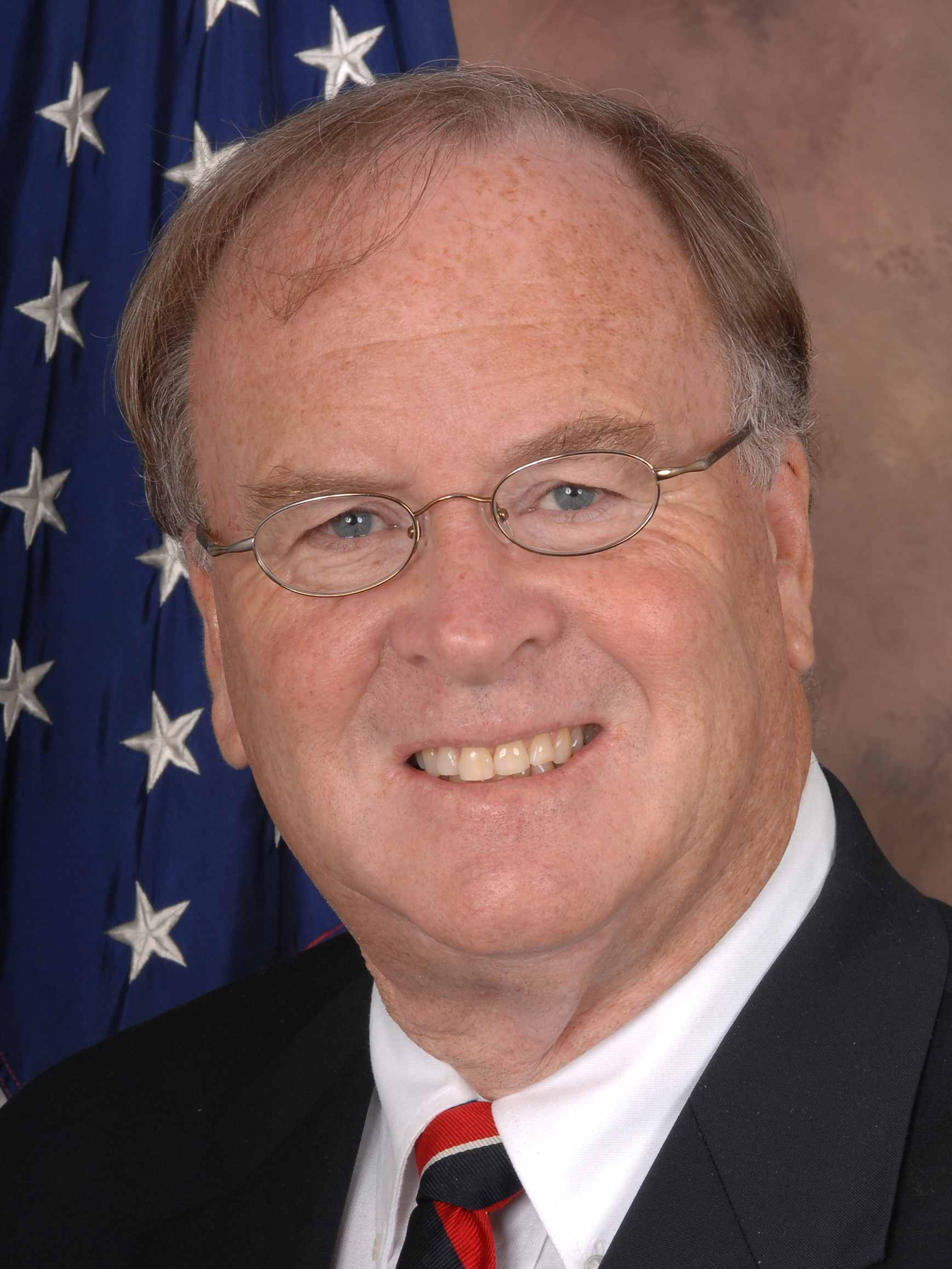

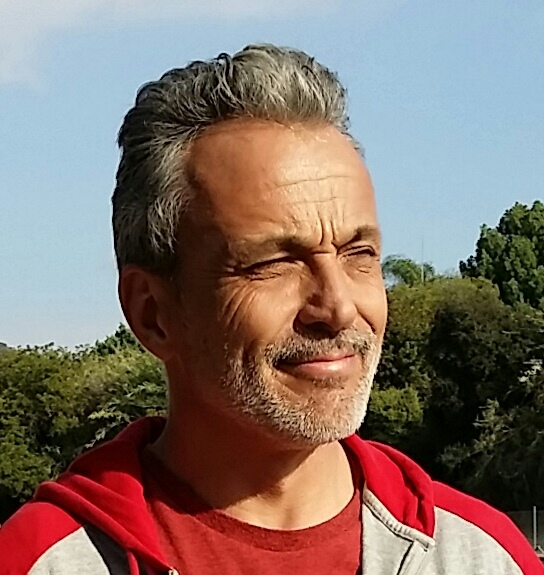
Nominee	Sam Farr	Mark Risley
Party	Democratic	Republican
Popular vote	148,958	65,117
Percentage	66.7%	29.2%
- County results Farr: 50–60% 60–70% 70–80%
U.S. Representative before election
Sam Farr
Democratic
Elected U.S. Representative
Sam Farr
Democratic

=== Predictions ===
Source	Ranking	As of
The Cook Political Report	Safe D	October 29, 2004
Sabato's Crystal Ball	Safe D	November 1, 2004

=== Results ===
California's 17th congressional district election, 2004
Party	Candidate	Votes	%
Democratic	Sam Farr (incumbent)	148,958	66.73
Republican	Mark Risley	65,117	29.17
Green	Ray Glock-Grueneich	3,645	1.63
Peace and Freedom	Joe Williams	2,823	1.26
Libertarian	Joel Smolen	2,607	1.17
No party	David Mauricio Munoz (write-in)	75	0.03
Total votes		223,225	100.00
Turnout			
Democratic hold			

== District 18 ==
2004 California's 18th congressional district election
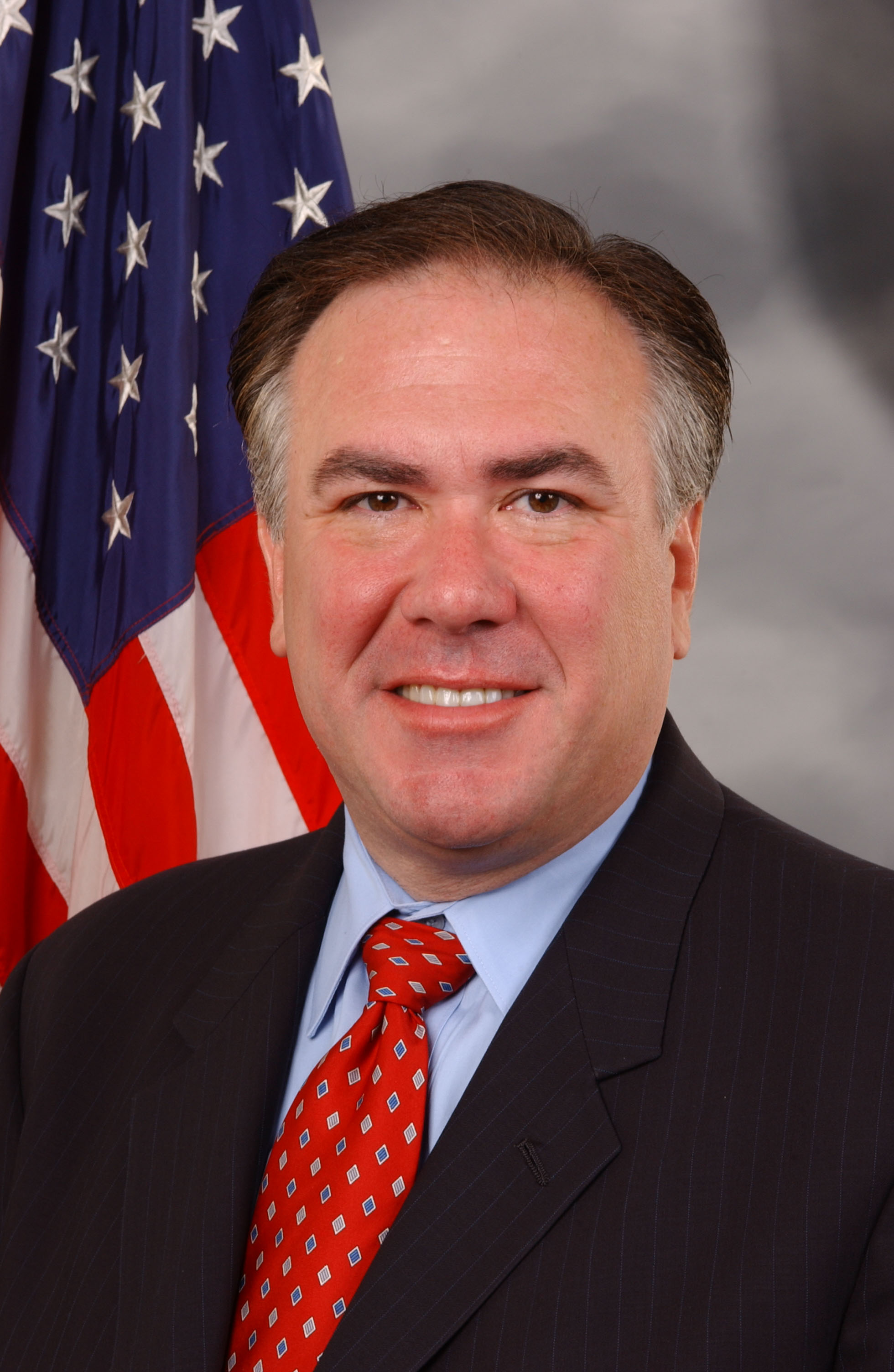

Nominee	Dennis Cardoza	Charles F. Pringle, Sr.
Party	Democratic	Republican
Popular vote	103,732	49,973
Percentage	67.5%	32.5%
- County results Cardoza: 60–70% 70–80% Charles F. Pringle: 50–60%
U.S. Representative before election
Dennis Cardoza
Democratic
Elected U.S. Representative
Dennis Cardoza
Democratic

=== Predictions ===
Source	Ranking	As of
The Cook Political Report	Safe D	October 29, 2004
Sabato's Crystal Ball	Safe D	November 1, 2004

=== Results ===
California's 18th congressional district election, 2004
Party	Candidate	Votes	%
Democratic	Dennis Cardoza (incumbent)	103,732	67.49
Republican	Charles F. Pringle, Sr.	49,973	32.51
Total votes		153,705	100.00
Turnout			
Democratic hold			

== District 19 ==
2004 California's 19th congressional district election
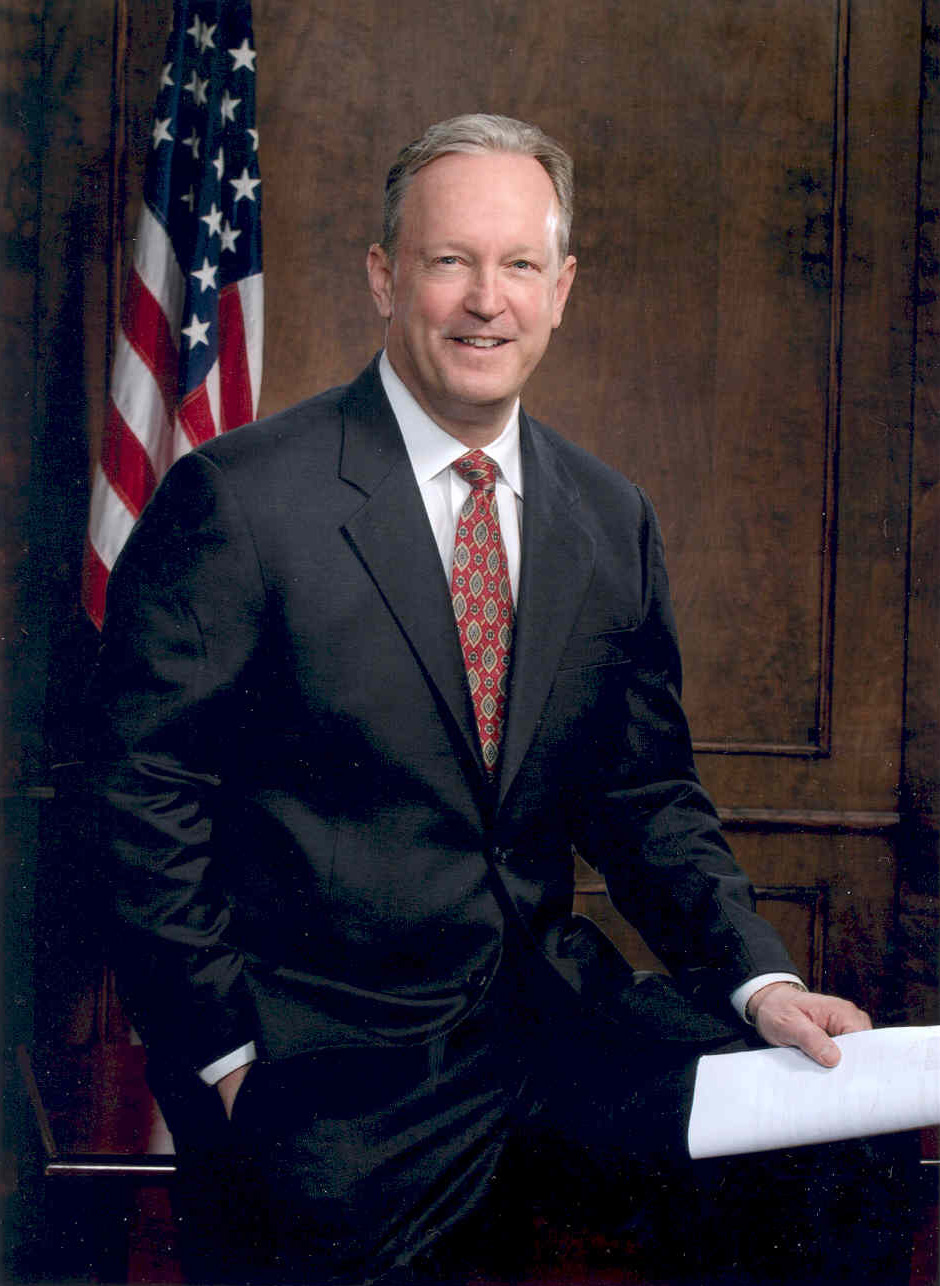

Nominee	George Radanovich	James Lex Bufford	Larry R. Mullen
Party	Republican	Democratic	Green
Popular vote	155,354	64,047	15,863
Percentage	66.0%	27.2%	6.7%
- County results Radanovich: 60–70%
U.S. Representative before election
George Radanovich
Republican
Elected U.S. Representative
George Radanovich
Republican

=== Predictions ===
Source	Ranking	As of
The Cook Political Report	Safe R	October 29, 2004
Sabato's Crystal Ball	Safe R	November 1, 2004

=== Results ===
California's 19th congressional district election, 2004
Party	Candidate	Votes	%
Republican	George Radanovich (incumbent)	155,354	66.03
Democratic	James Lex Bufford	64,047	27.22
Green	Larry R. Mullen	15,863	6.74
Total votes		235,264	100.00
Turnout			
Republican hold			

== District 20 ==
2004 California's 20th congressional district election
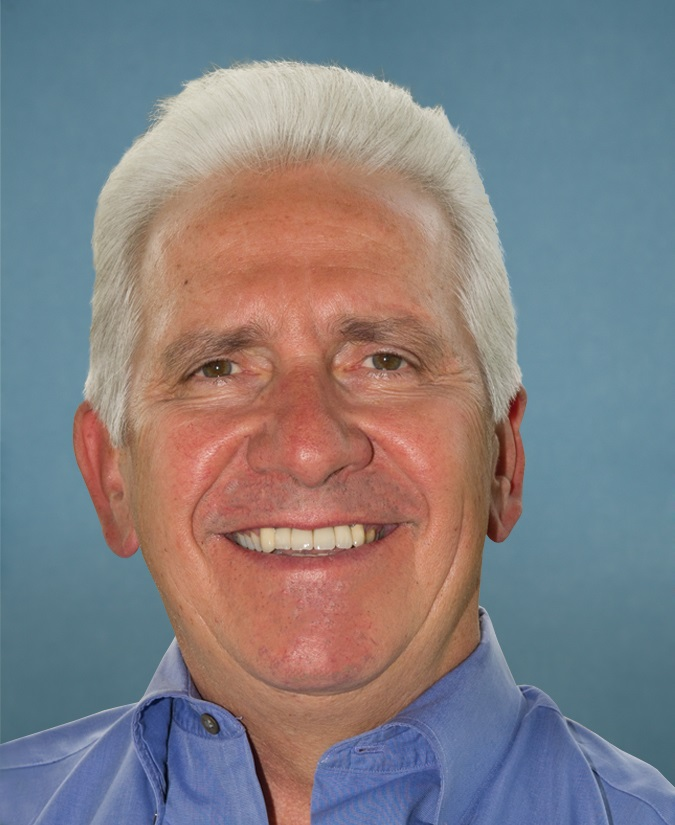

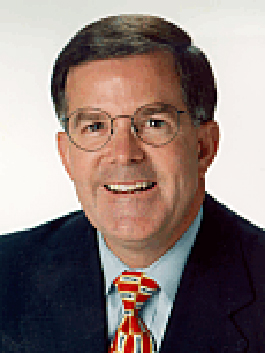
Nominee	Jim Costa	Roy Ashburn
Party	Democratic	Republican
Popular vote	61,005	53,231
Percentage	53.4%	46.6%
- County results Costa: 50–60% 60–70% Ashburn: 60–70%
U.S. Representative before election
Cal Dooley
Democratic
Elected U.S. Representative
Jim Costa
Democratic

=== Predictions ===
Source	Ranking	As of
The Cook Political Report	Lean D	October 29, 2004
Sabato's Crystal Ball	Safe D	November 1, 2004

=== Results ===
California's 20th congressional district election, 2004
Party	Candidate	Votes	%
Democratic	Jim Costa	61,005	53.40
Republican	Roy Ashburn	53,231	46.60
Total votes		114,236	100.00
Turnout			
Democratic hold			

== District 21 ==
2004 California's 21st congressional district election
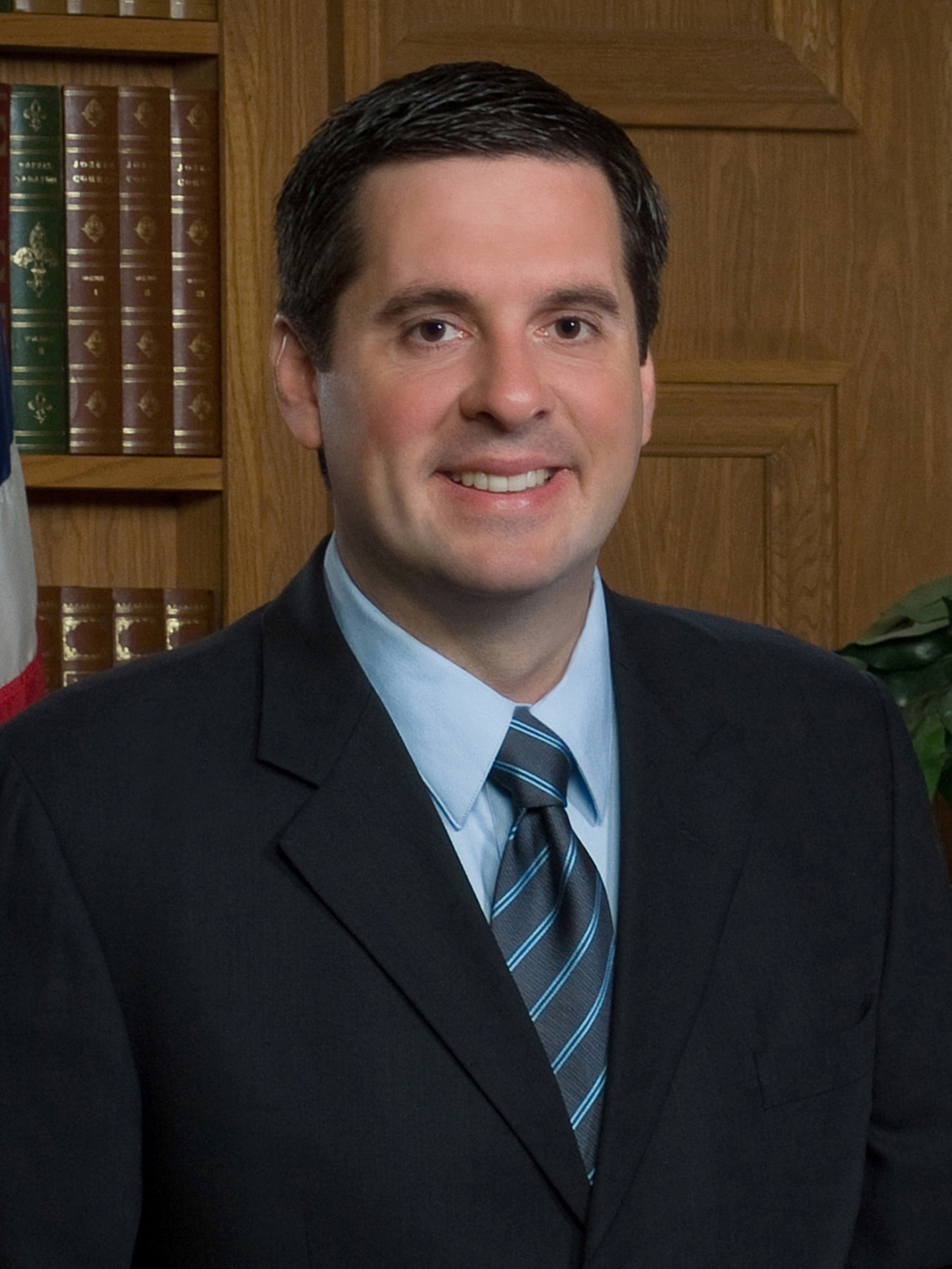

Nominee	Devin Nunes	Fred B. Davis
Party	Republican	Democratic
Popular vote	140,721	51,594
Percentage	73.2%	26.8%
- County results Nunes: 70–80%
U.S. Representative before election
Devin Nunes
Republican
Elected U.S. Representative
Devin Nunes
Republican

=== Predictions ===
Source	Ranking	As of
The Cook Political Report	Safe R	October 29, 2004
Sabato's Crystal Ball	Safe R	November 1, 2004

=== Results ===
California's 21st congressional district election, 2004
Party	Candidate	Votes	%
Republican	Devin Nunes (incumbent)	140,721	73.17
Democratic	Fred B. Davis	51,594	26.83
Total votes		192,315	100.00
Turnout			
Republican hold			

== District 22 ==
2004 California's 22nd congressional district election
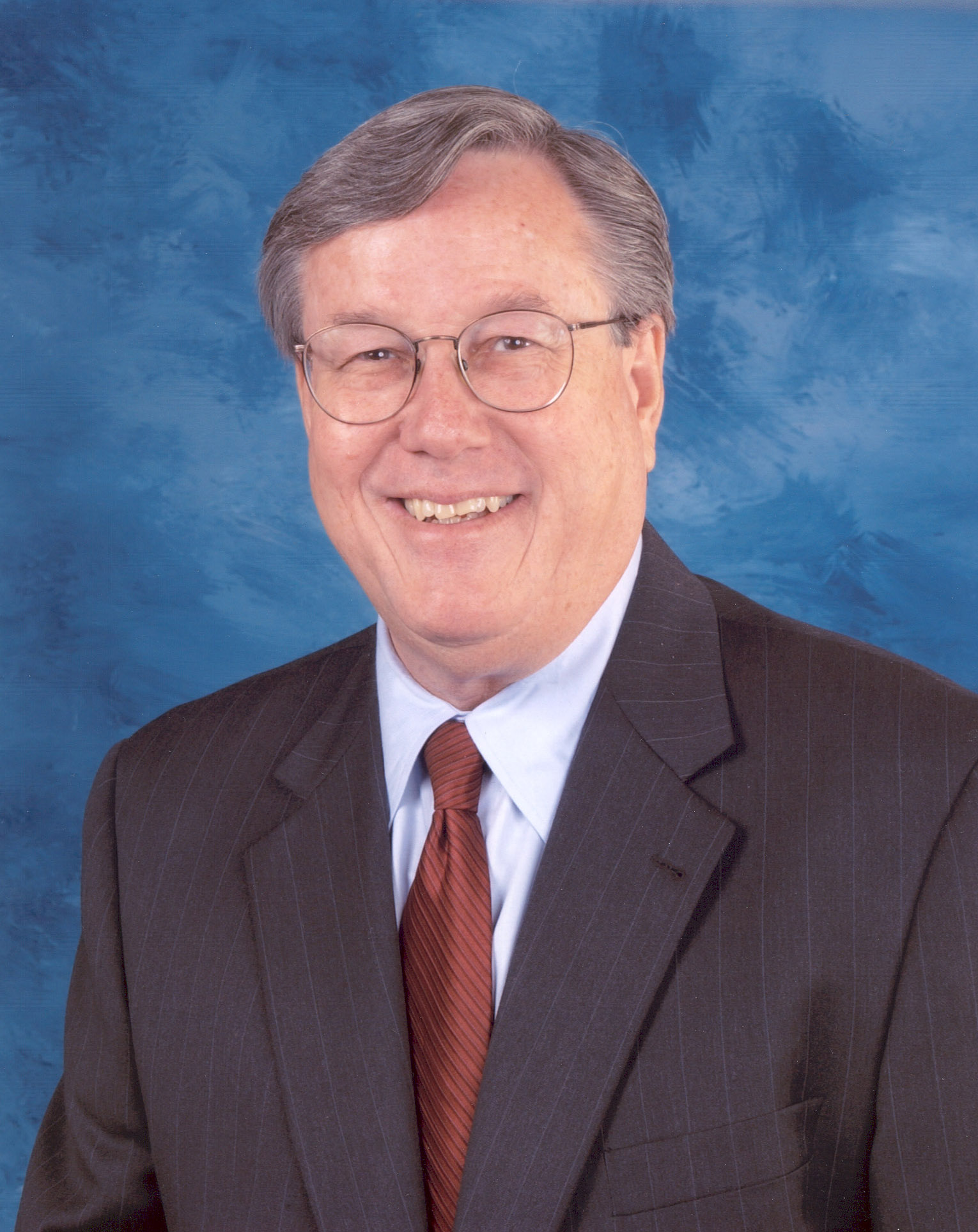
Nominee	Bill Thomas
Party	Republican
Popular vote	209,384
Percentage	100.0%
U.S. Representative before election
Bill Thomas
Republican
Elected U.S. Representative
Bill Thomas
Republican

=== Predictions ===
Source	Ranking	As of
The Cook Political Report	Safe R	October 29, 2004
Sabato's Crystal Ball	Safe R	November 1, 2004

=== Results ===
California's 22nd congressional district election, 2004
Party	Candidate	Votes	%
Republican	Bill Thomas (incumbent)	209,384	100.00
Total votes		209,384	100.00
Turnout			
Republican hold			

== District 23 ==
2004 California's 23rd congressional district election
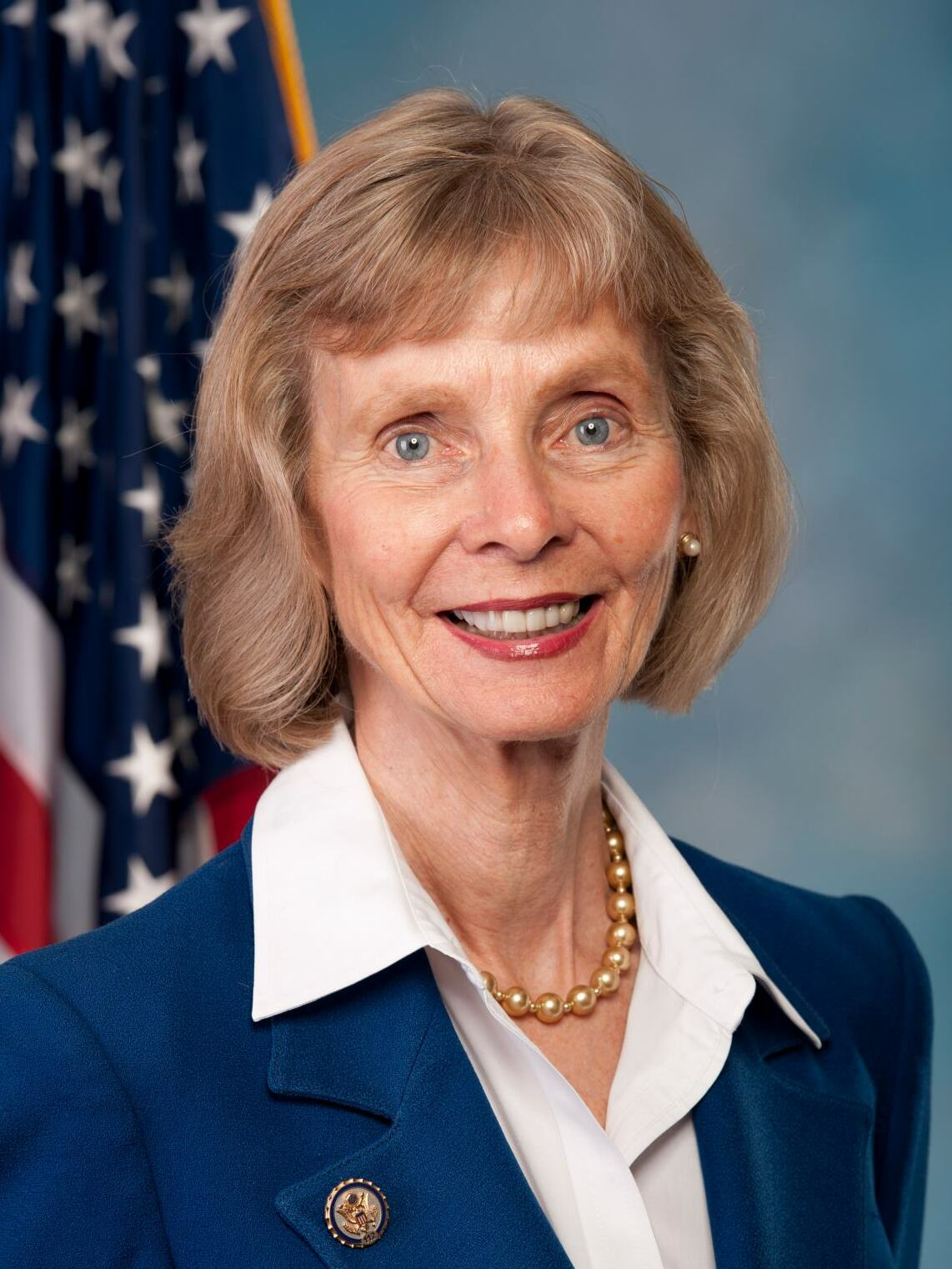

Nominee	Lois Capps	Don Regan
Party	Democratic	Republican
Popular vote	153,980	83,926
Percentage	63.0%	34.4%
- County results Capps: 50–60% 60–70%
U.S. Representative before election
Lois Capps
Democratic
Elected U.S. Representative
Lois Capps
Democratic

=== Predictions ===
Source	Ranking	As of
The Cook Political Report	Safe D	October 29, 2004
Sabato's Crystal Ball	Safe D	November 1, 2004

=== Results ===
California's 23rd congressional district election, 2004
Party	Candidate	Votes	%
Democratic	Lois Capps (incumbent)	153,980	63.03
Republican	Don Regan	83,926	34.35
Libertarian	Michael Favorite	6,391	2.62
Total votes		244,297	100.00
Turnout			
Democratic hold			

== District 24 ==
2004 California's 24th congressional district election
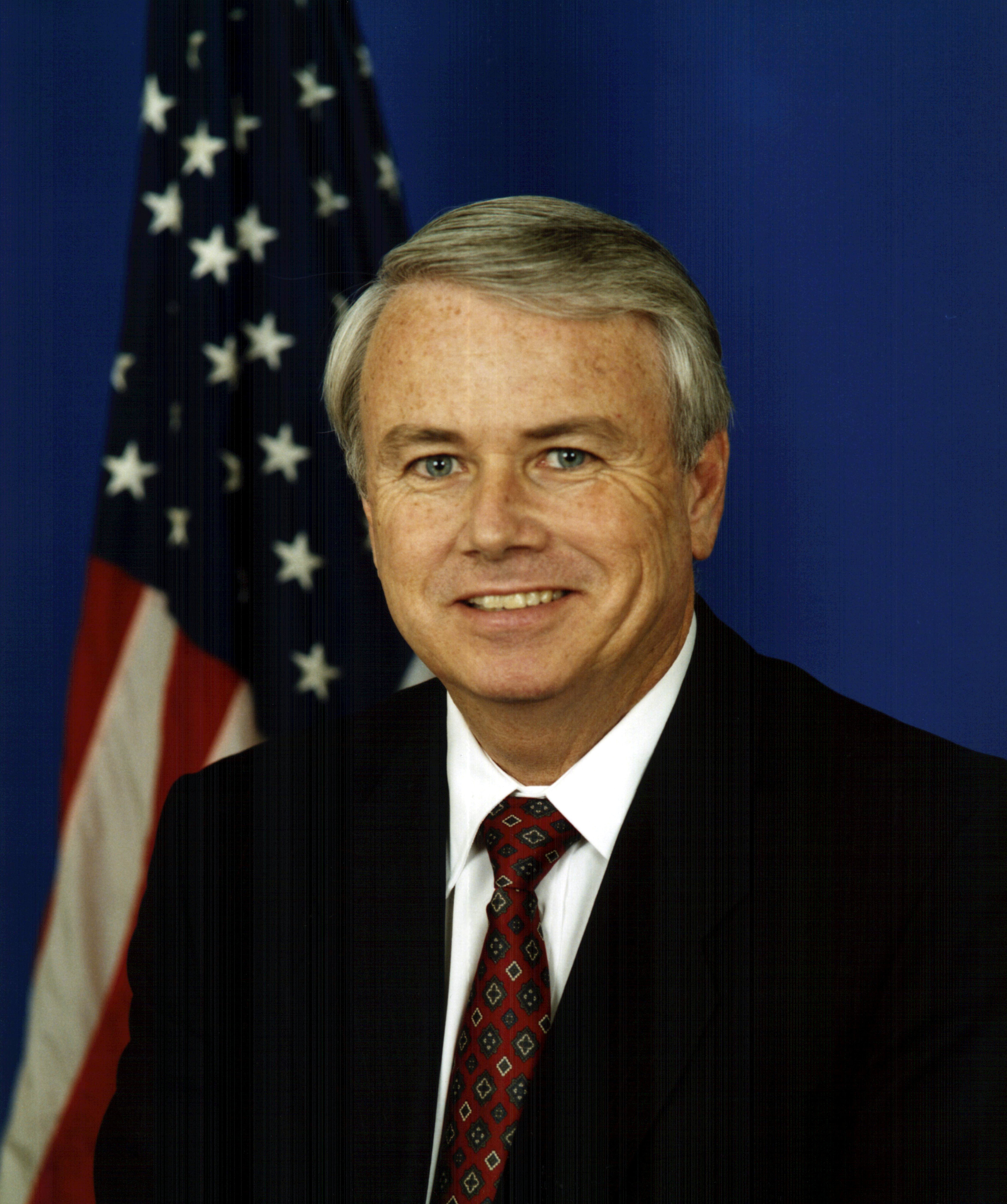

Nominee	Elton Gallegly	Brett Wagner
Party	Republican	Democratic
Popular vote	178,660	96,397
Percentage	62.8%	33.9%
- County results Gallegly: 60–70%
U.S. Representative before election
Elton Gallegly
Republican
Elected U.S. Representative
Elton Gallegly
Republican

=== Predictions ===
Source	Ranking	As of
The Cook Political Report	Safe R	October 29, 2004
Sabato's Crystal Ball	Safe R	November 1, 2004

=== Results ===
California's 24th congressional district election, 2004
Party	Candidate	Votes	%
Republican	Elton Gallegly (incumbent)	178,660	62.82
Democratic	Brett Wagner	96,397	33.90
Green	Stuart A. Bechman	9,321	3.28
Total votes		284,378	100.00
Turnout			
Republican hold			

== District 25 ==
2004 California's 25th congressional district election
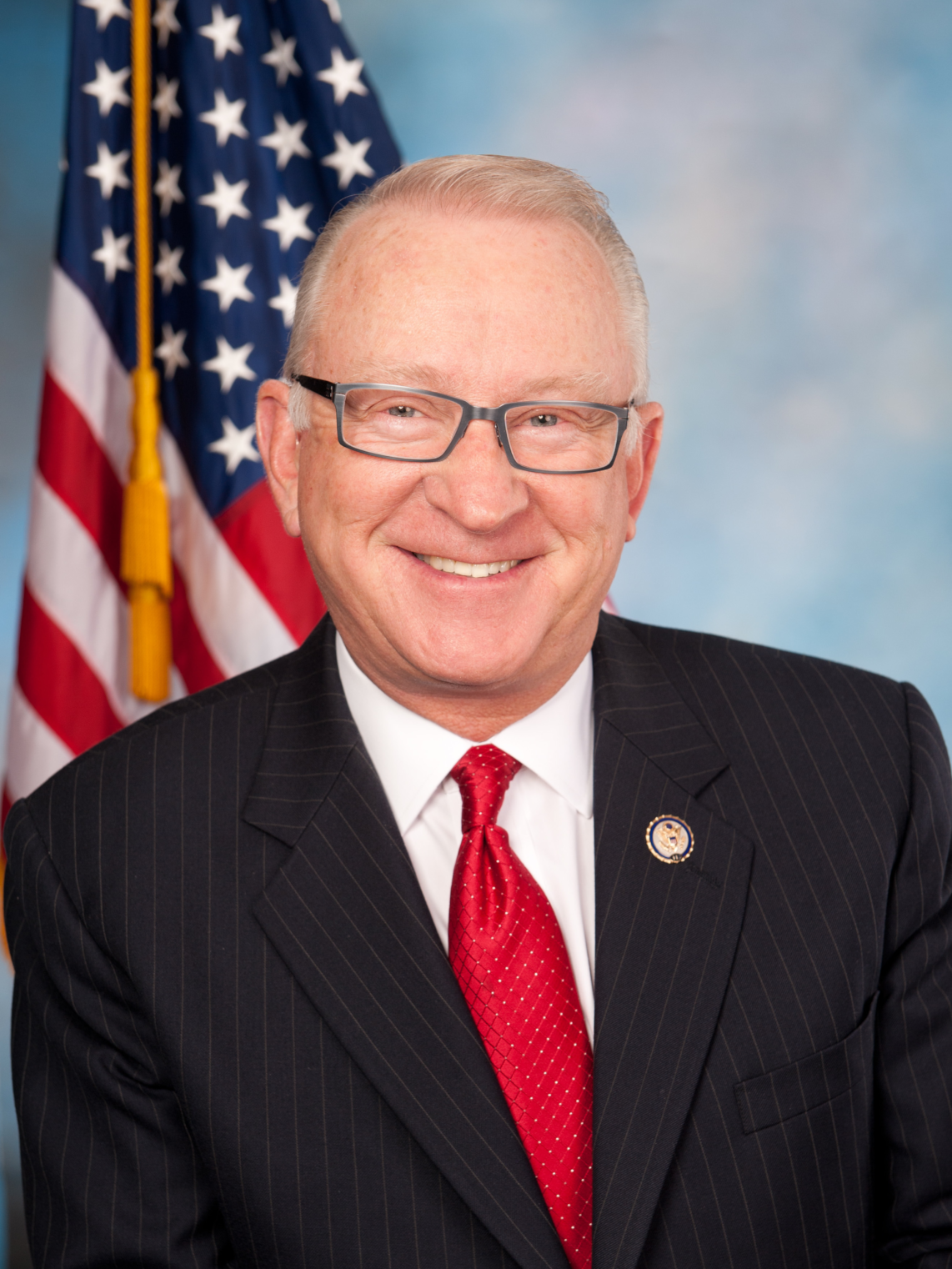

Nominee	Howard McKeon	Fred "Tim" Willoughby
Party	Republican	Democratic
Popular vote	145,575	80,395
Percentage	64.4%	35.6%
- County results Mckeon: 50–60% 60–70%
U.S. Representative before election
Howard McKeon
Republican
Elected U.S. Representative
Howard McKeon
Republican

=== Predictions ===
Source	Ranking	As of
The Cook Political Report	Safe R	October 29, 2004
Sabato's Crystal Ball	Safe R	November 1, 2004

=== Results ===
California's 25th congressional district election, 2004
Party	Candidate	Votes	%
Republican	Howard McKeon (incumbent)	145,575	64.42
Democratic	Fred "Tim" Willoughby	80,395	35.58
Total votes		225,970	100.00
Turnout			
Republican hold			

== District 26 ==
2004 California's 26th congressional district election
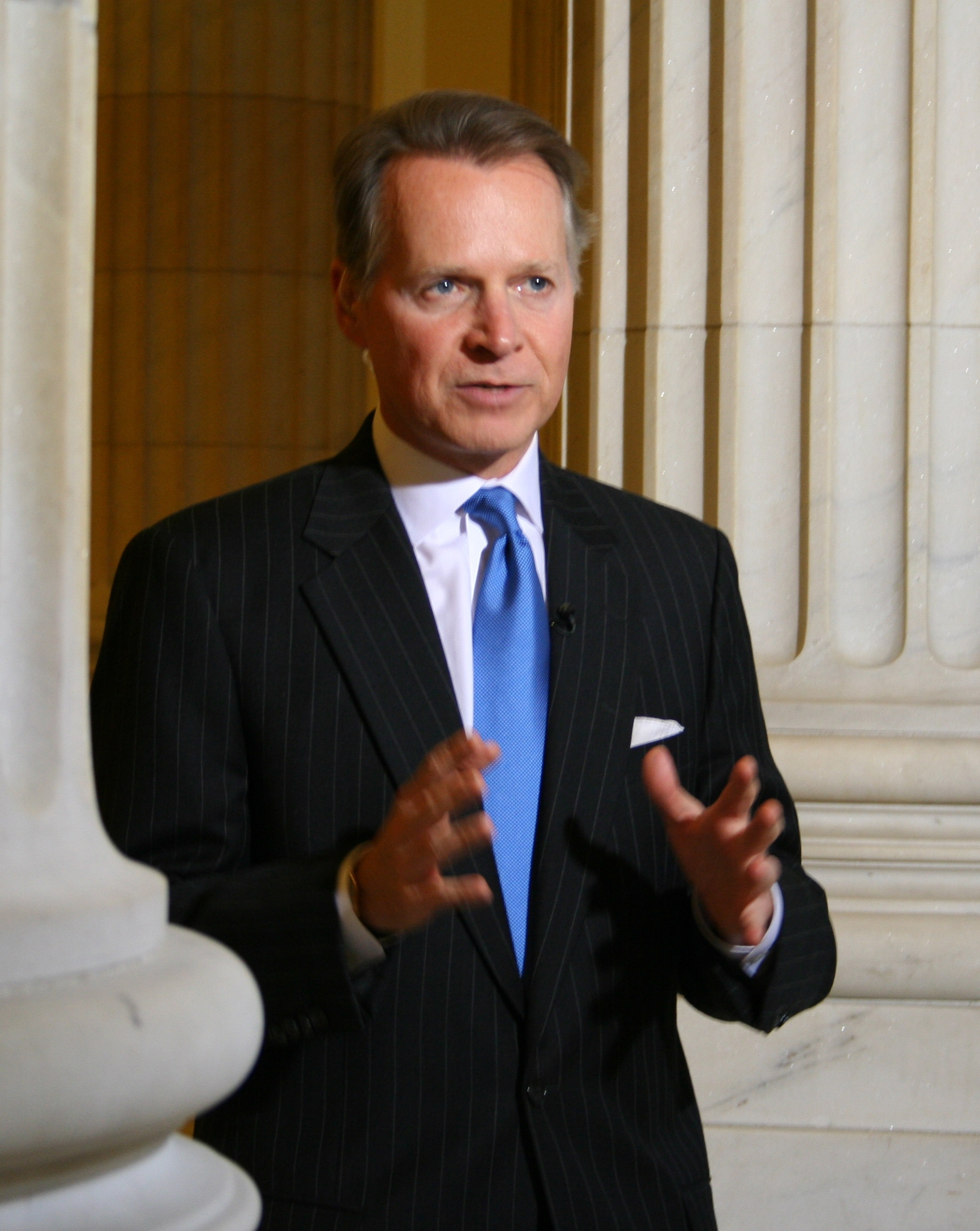

Nominee	David Dreier	Cynthia Matthews
Party	Republican	Democratic
Popular vote	134,596	107,522
Percentage	53.6%	42.8%
- County results Dreier: 50–60%
U.S. Representative before election
David Dreier
Republican
Elected U.S. Representative
David Dreier
Republican

=== Predictions ===
Source	Ranking	As of
The Cook Political Report	Safe R	October 29, 2004
Sabato's Crystal Ball	Safe R	November 1, 2004

=== Results ===
California's 26th congressional district election, 2004
Party	Candidate	Votes	%
Republican	David Dreier (incumbent)	134,596	53.58
Democratic	Cynthia Matthews	107,522	42.80
Libertarian	Randall Weissbuch	9,089	3.62
Total votes		251,207	100.00
Turnout			
Republican hold			

== District 27 ==
2004 California's 27th congressional district election
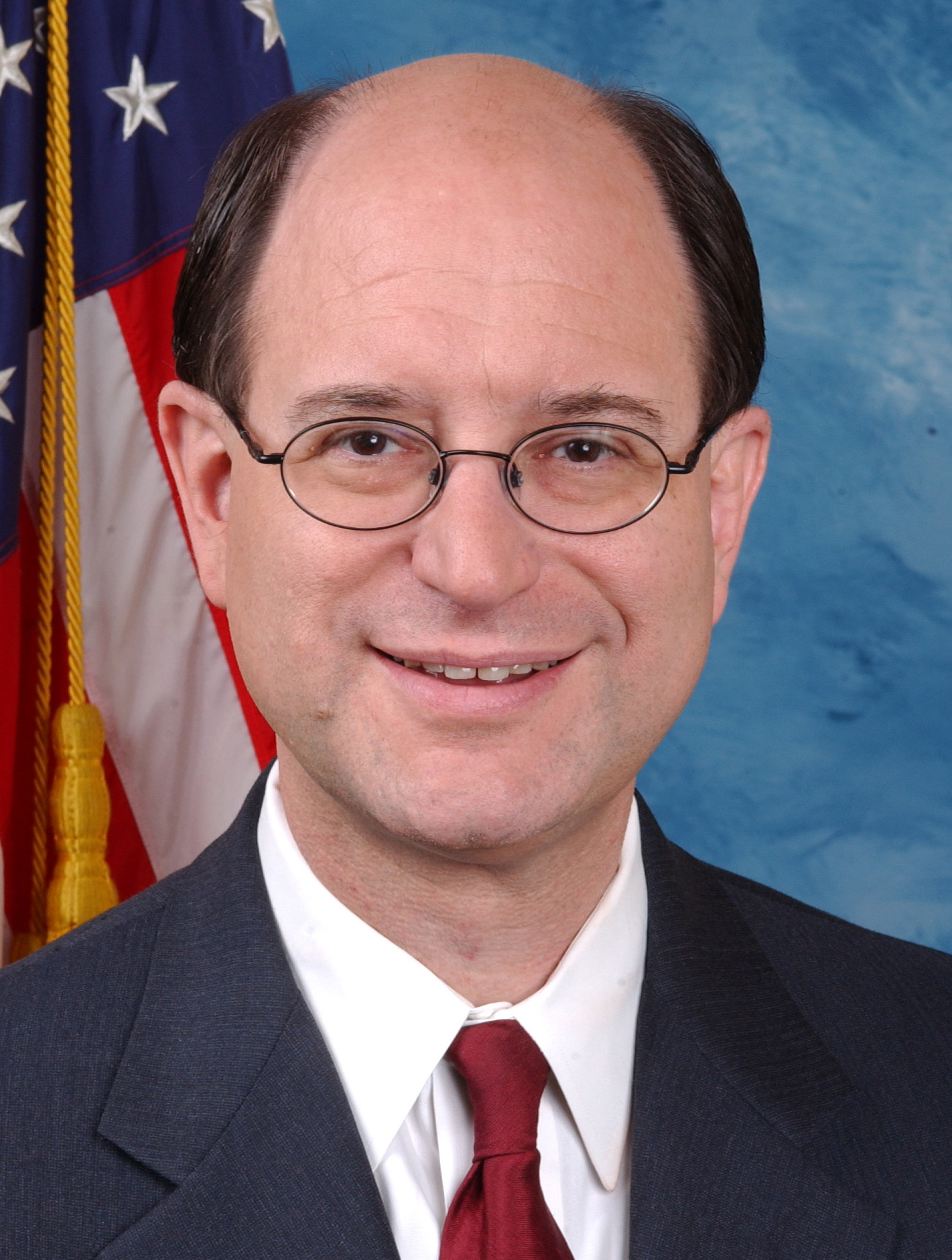

Nominee	Brad Sherman	Robert M. Levy
Party	Democratic	Republican
Popular vote	125,296	66,946
Percentage	62.3%	33.3%
- County results Sherman: 60–70%
U.S. Representative before election
Brad Sherman
Democratic
Elected U.S. Representative
Brad Sherman
Democratic

=== Predictions ===
Source	Ranking	As of
The Cook Political Report	Safe D	October 29, 2004
Sabato's Crystal Ball	Safe D	November 1, 2004

=== Results ===
California's 27th congressional district election, 2004
Party	Candidate	Votes	%
Democratic	Brad Sherman (incumbent)	125,296	62.27
Republican	Robert M. Levy	66,946	33.27
Green	Eric J. Carter	8,956	4.45
Total votes		201,198	100.00
Turnout			
Democratic hold			

== District 28 ==
2004 California's 28th congressional district election
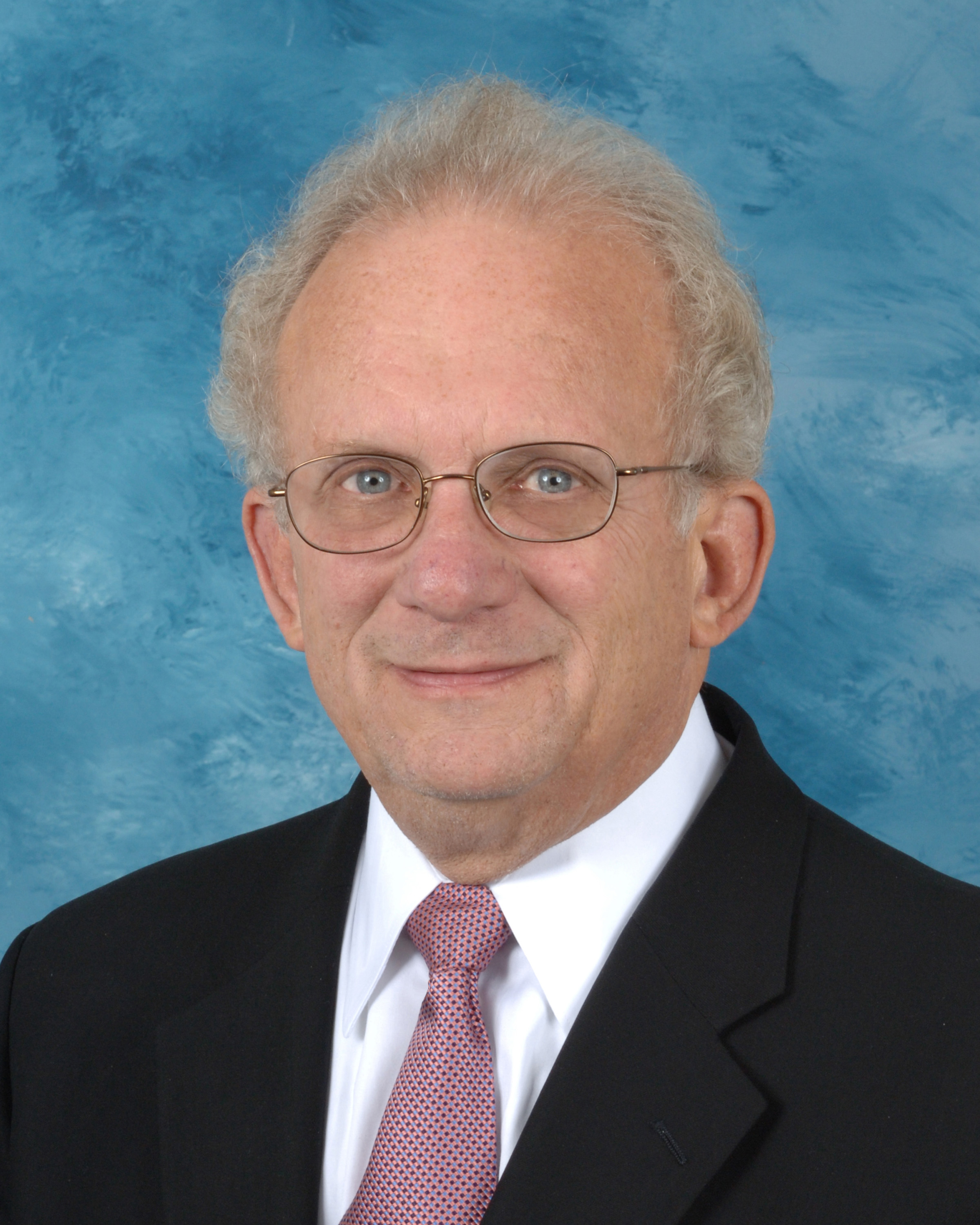

Nominee	Howard Berman	David Hernandez	Kelley L. Ross
Party	Democratic	Republican	Libertarian
Popular vote	115,303	37,868	9,339
Percentage	71.0%	23.3%	5.8%
- County results Berman: 70–80%
U.S. Representative before election
Howard Berman
Democratic
Elected U.S. Representative
Howard Berman
Democratic

=== Predictions ===
Source	Ranking	As of
The Cook Political Report	Safe D	October 29, 2004
Sabato's Crystal Ball	Safe D	November 1, 2004

=== Results ===
California's 28th congressional district election, 2004
Party	Candidate	Votes	%
Democratic	Howard Berman (incumbent)	115,303	70.95
Republican	David Hernandez	37,868	23.30
Libertarian	Kelley L. Ross	9,339	5.75
Total votes		162,510	100.00
Turnout			
Democratic hold			

== District 29 ==
2004 California's 29th congressional district election
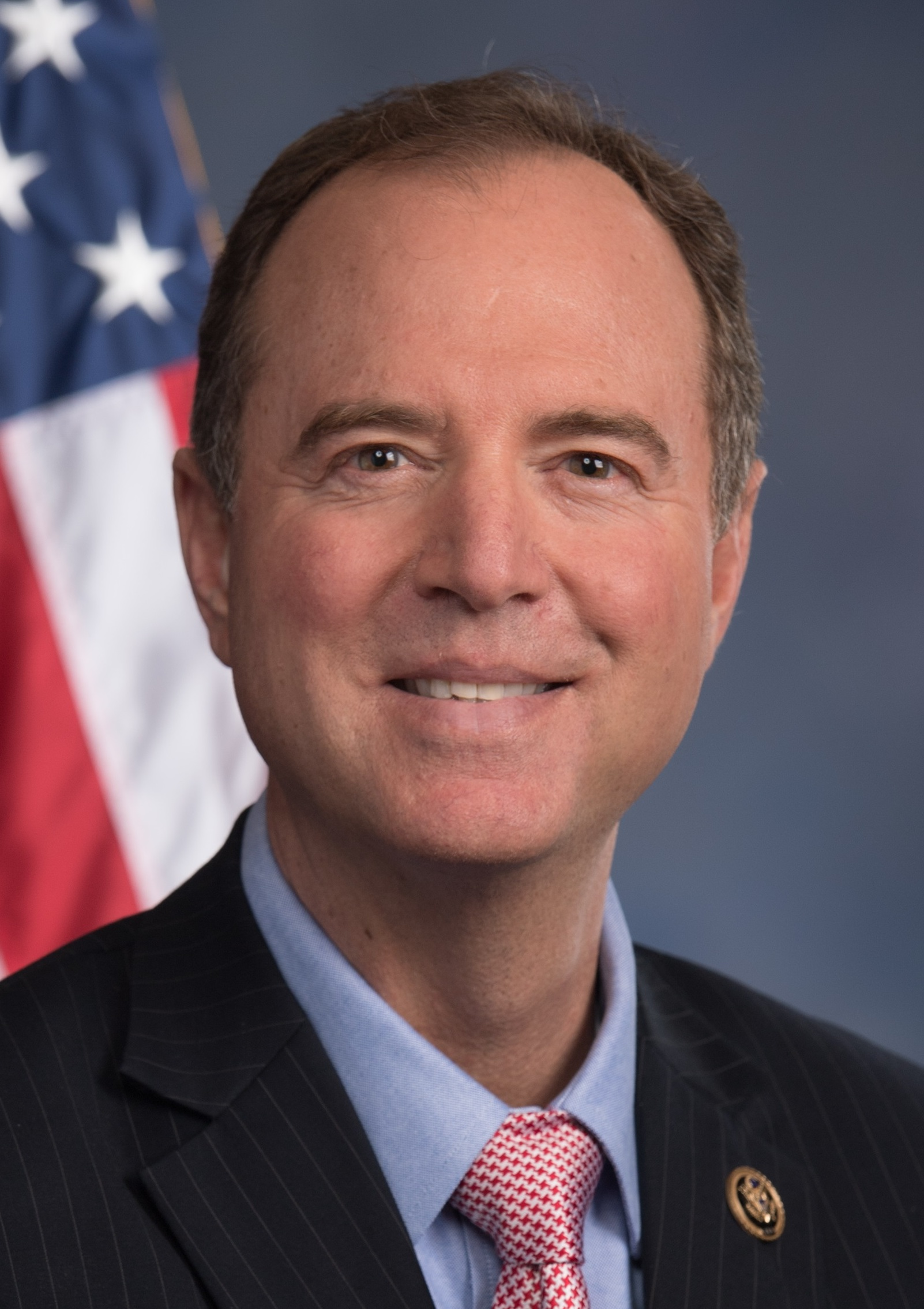

Nominee	Adam Schiff	Harry Scolinos
Party	Democratic	Republican
Popular vote	133,670	62,871
Percentage	64.6%	30.4%
- County results Schiff: 60–70%
U.S. Representative before election
Adam Schiff
Democratic
Elected U.S. Representative
Adam Schiff
Democratic

=== Predictions ===
Source	Ranking	As of
The Cook Political Report	Safe D	October 29, 2004
Sabato's Crystal Ball	Safe D	November 1, 2004

=== Results ===
California's 29th congressional district election, 2004
Party	Candidate	Votes	%
Democratic	Adam Schiff (incumbent)	133,670	64.63
Republican	Harry Scolinos	62,871	30.40
Green	Philip Koebel	5,715	2.76
Libertarian	Ted Brown	4,570	2.21
No party	John Burton (write-in)	6	0.00
Total votes		206,832	100.00
Turnout			
Democratic hold			

== District 30 ==
2004 California's 30th congressional district election
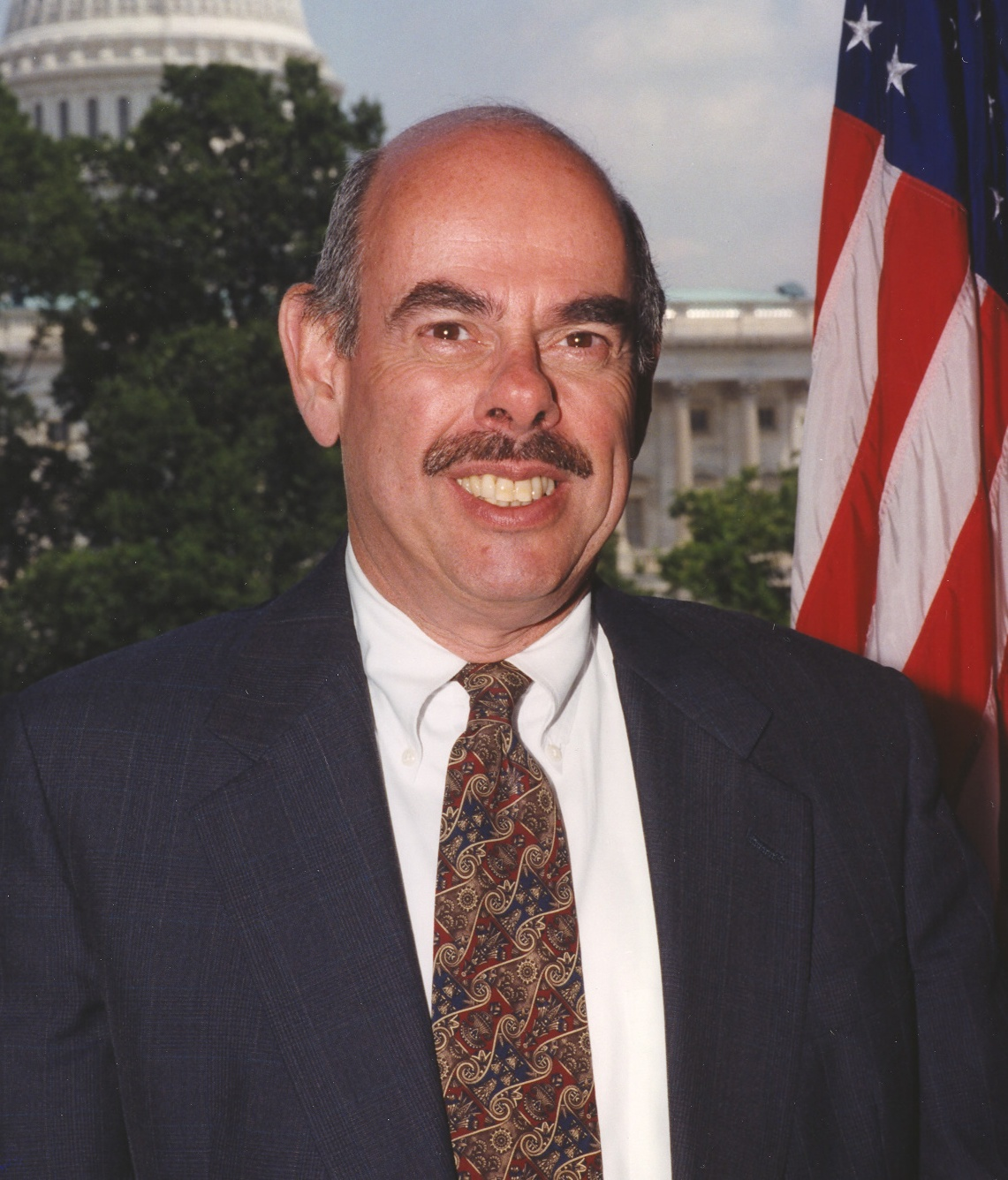

Nominee	Henry Waxman	Victor Elizade
Party	Democratic	Republican
Popular vote	216,682	87,465
Percentage	71.2%	28.8%
- County results Waxman: 70–80%
U.S. Representative before election
Henry Waxman
Democratic
Elected U.S. Representative
Henry Waxman
Democratic

=== Predictions ===
Source	Ranking	As of
The Cook Political Report	Safe D	October 29, 2004
Sabato's Crystal Ball	Safe D	November 1, 2004

=== Results ===
California's 30th congressional district election, 2004
Party	Candidate	Votes	%
Democratic	Henry Waxman (incumbent)	216,682	71.24
Republican	Victor Elizade	87,465	28.76
Total votes		304,147	100.00
Turnout			
Democratic hold			

== District 31 ==
2004 California's 31st congressional district election
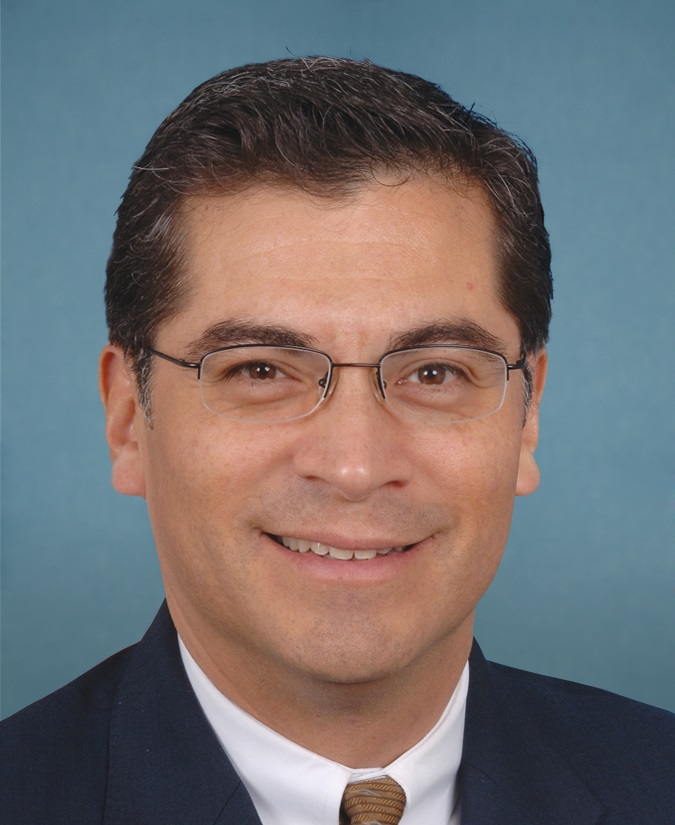

Nominee	Xavier Becerra	Luis Vega
Party	Democratic	Republican
Popular vote	89,363	22,048
Percentage	80.2%	19.8%
- County results Becerra: 80–90%
U.S. Representative before election
Xavier Becerra
Democratic
Elected U.S. Representative
Xavier Becerra
Democratic

=== Predictions ===
Source	Ranking	As of
The Cook Political Report	Safe D	October 29, 2004
Sabato's Crystal Ball	Safe D	November 1, 2004

=== Results ===
California's 31st congressional district election, 2004
Party	Candidate	Votes	%
Democratic	Xavier Becerra (incumbent)	89,363	80.21
Republican	Luis Vega	22,048	19.79
Total votes		111,411	100.00
Turnout			
Democratic hold			

== District 32 ==
2004 California's 32nd congressional district election
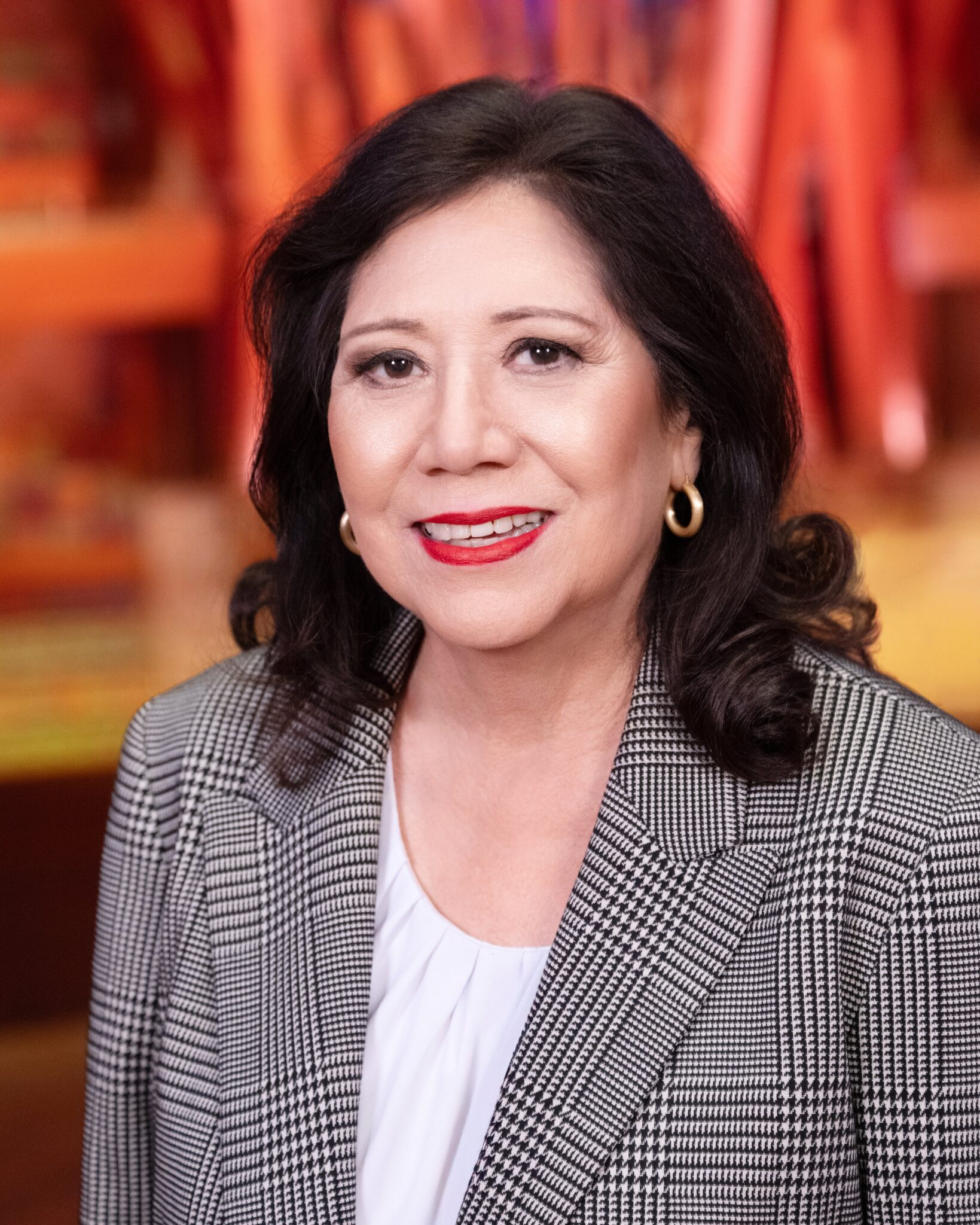

Nominee	Hilda Solis	Leland Faegre
Party	Democratic	Libertarian
Popular vote	119,144	21,002
Percentage	85.0%	15.0%
- County results Solis: 80–90%
U.S. Representative before election
Hilda Solis
Democratic
Elected U.S. Representative
Hilda Solis
Democratic

=== Predictions ===
Source	Ranking	As of
The Cook Political Report	Safe D	October 29, 2004
Sabato's Crystal Ball	Safe D	November 1, 2004

=== Results ===
California's 32nd congressional district election, 2004
Party	Candidate	Votes	%
Democratic	Hilda Solis (incumbent)	119,144	85.01
Libertarian	Leland Faegre	21,002	14.99
Total votes		140,146	100.00
Turnout			
Democratic hold			

== District 33 ==
2004 California's 33rd congressional district election
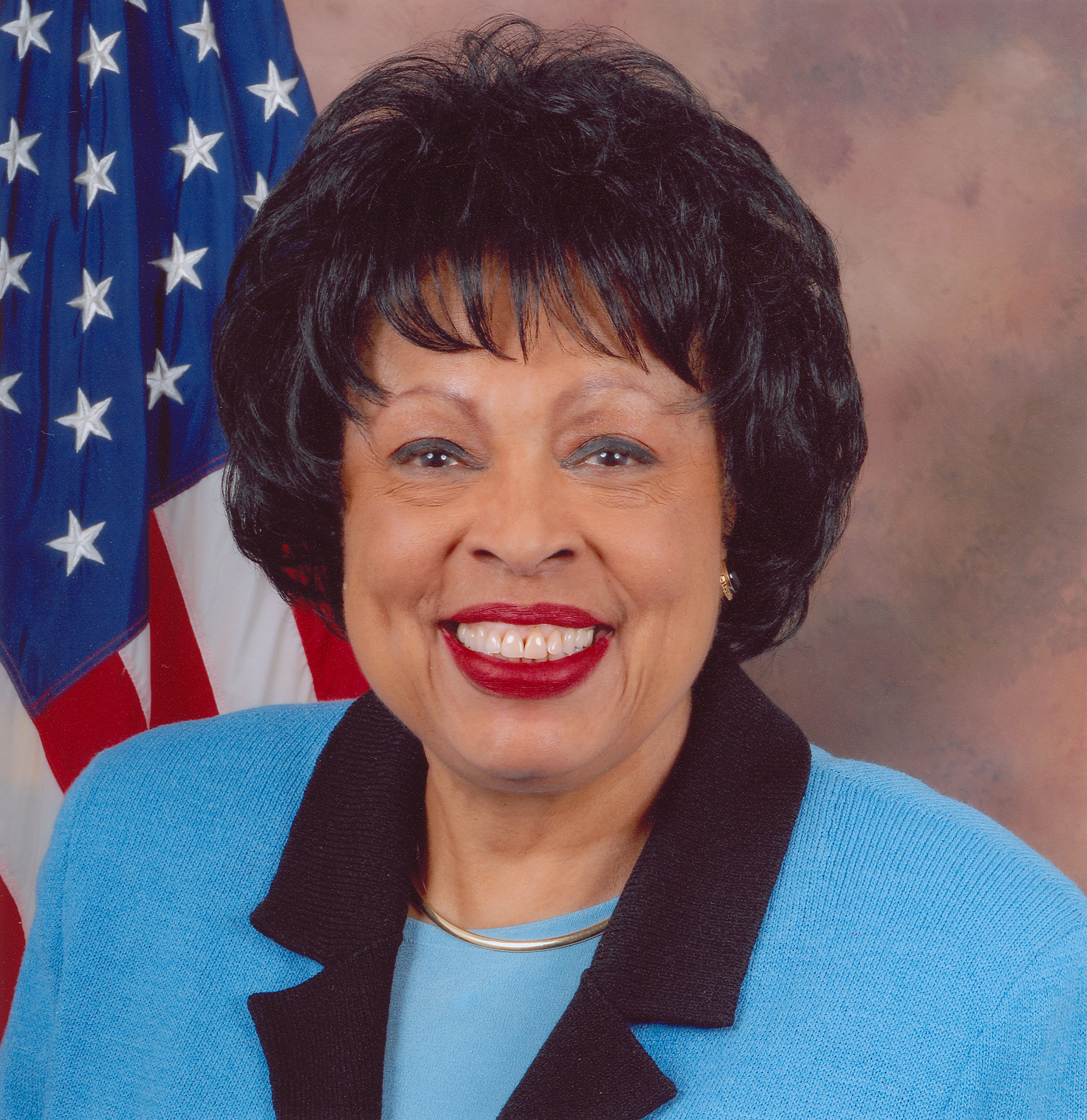

Nominee	Diane Watson	Robert G. Weber, Jr.
Party	Democratic	Libertarian
Popular vote	166,801	21,513
Percentage	88.6%	11.4%
- County results Watson: 80–90%
U.S. Representative before election
Diane Watson
Democratic
Elected U.S. Representative
Diane Watson
Democratic

=== Predictions ===
Source	Ranking	As of
The Cook Political Report	Safe D	October 29, 2004
Sabato's Crystal Ball	Safe D	November 1, 2004

=== Results ===
California's 33rd congressional district election, 2004
Party	Candidate	Votes	%
Democratic	Diane Watson (incumbent)	166,801	88.58
Libertarian	Robert G. Weber, Jr.	21,513	11.42
Total votes		188,314	100.00
Turnout			
Democratic hold			

== District 34 ==
2004 California's 34th congressional district election
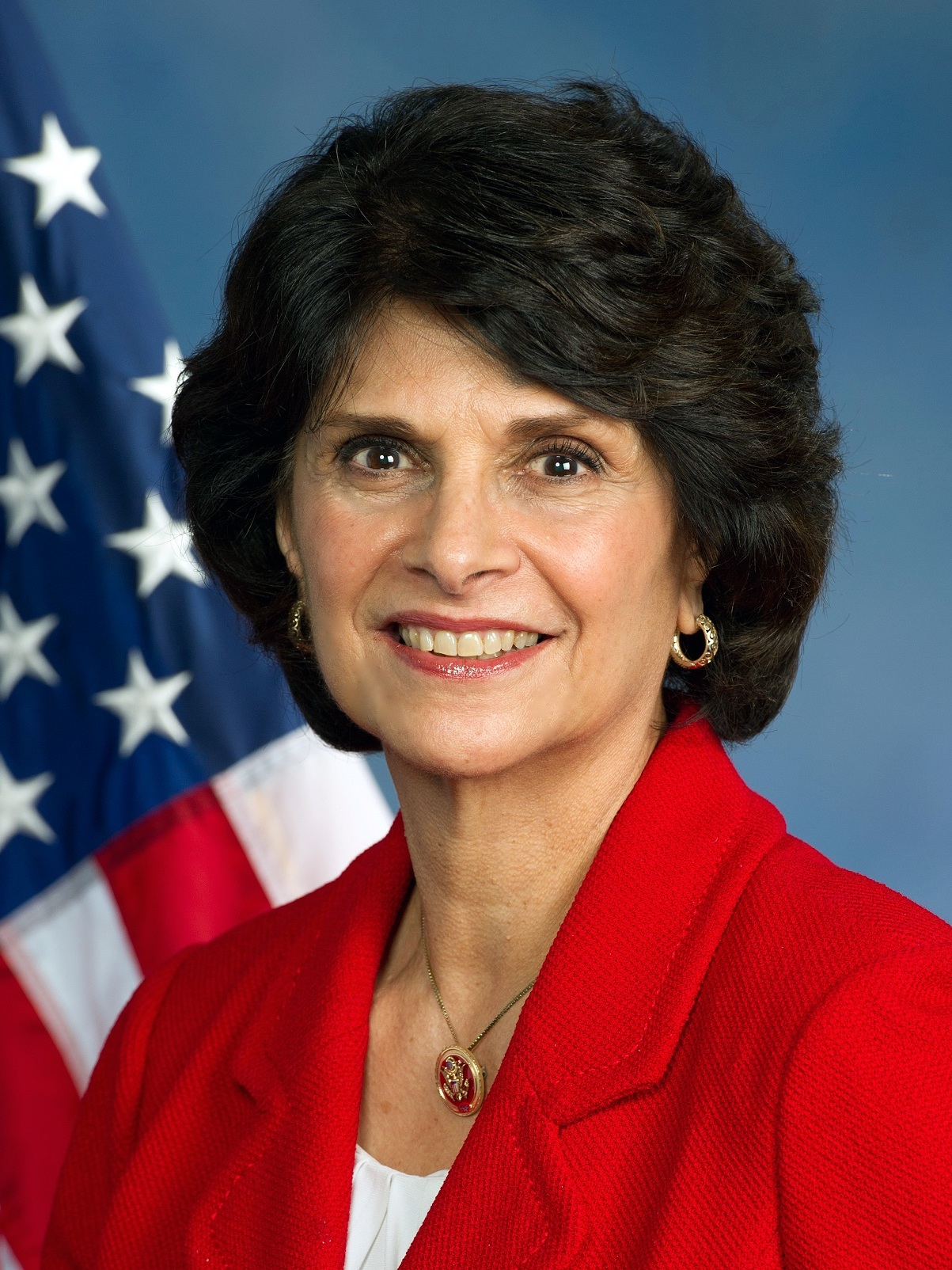

Nominee	Lucille Roybal-Allard	Wayne Miller
Party	Democratic	Republican
Popular vote	82,282	28,175
Percentage	74.5%	25.5%
- County results Roybal-Allard: 70–80%
U.S. Representative before election
Lucille Roybal-Allard
Democratic
Elected U.S. Representative
Lucille Roybal-Allard
Democratic

=== Predictions ===
Source	Ranking	As of
The Cook Political Report	Safe D	October 29, 2004
Sabato's Crystal Ball	Safe D	November 1, 2004

=== Results ===
California's 34th congressional district election, 2004
Party	Candidate	Votes	%
Democratic	Lucille Roybal-Allard (incumbent)	82,282	74.49
Republican	Wayne Miller	28,175	25.51
Total votes		110,457	100.00
Turnout			
Democratic hold			

== District 35 ==
2004 California's 35th congressional district election
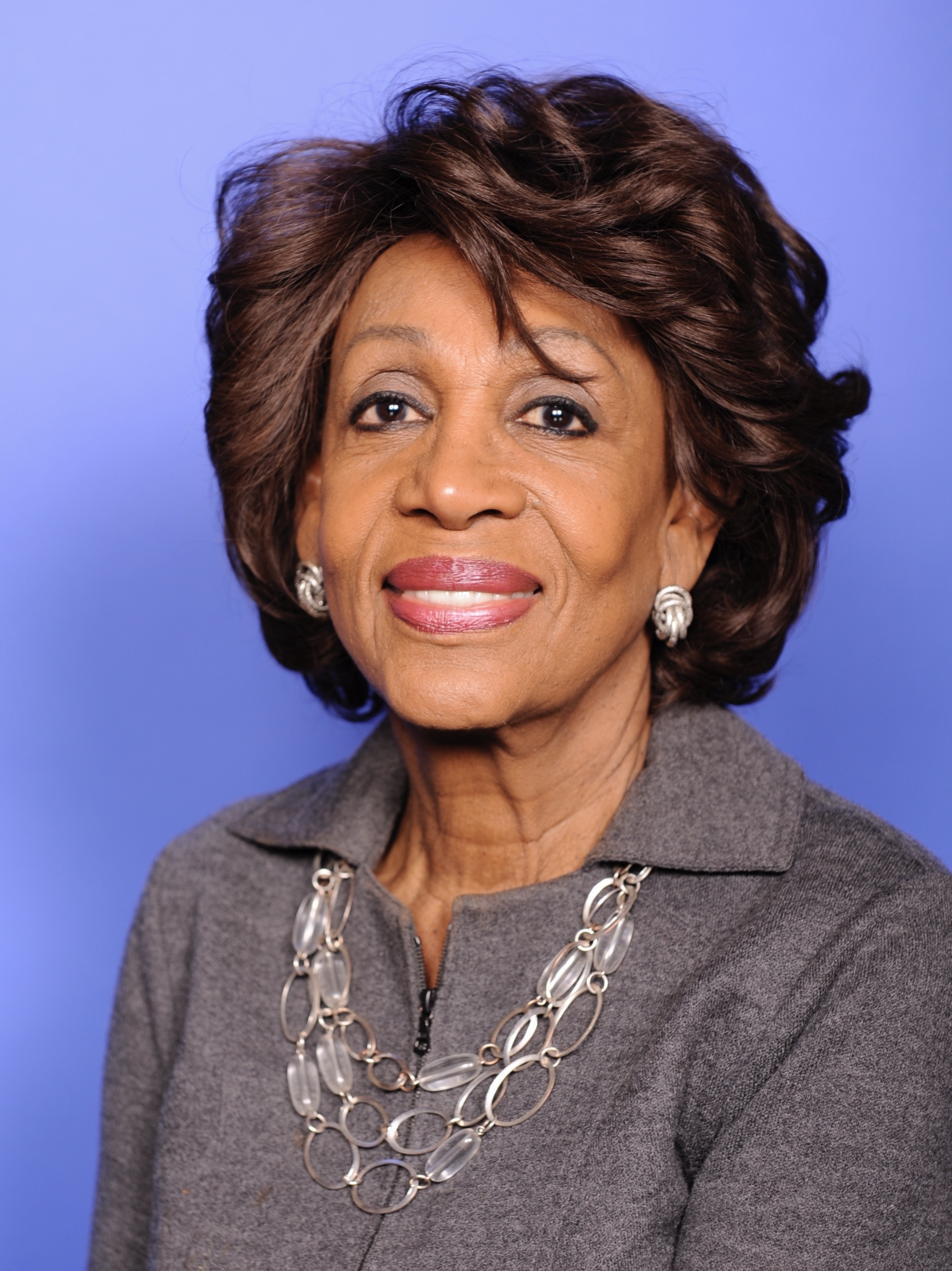

Nominee	Maxine Waters	Ross Moen
Party	Democratic	Republican
Popular vote	125,949	23,591
Percentage	80.5%	15.1%
- County results Waters: 80–90%
U.S. Representative before election
Maxine Waters
Democratic
Elected U.S. Representative
Maxine Waters
Democratic

=== Predictions ===
Source	Ranking	As of
The Cook Political Report	Safe D	October 29, 2004
Sabato's Crystal Ball	Safe D	November 1, 2004

=== Results ===
California's 35th congressional district election, 2004
Party	Candidate	Votes	%
Democratic	Maxine Waters (incumbent)	125,949	80.53
Republican	Ross Moen	23,591	15.08
American Independent	Gordon Michael Mego	3,440	2.20
Libertarian	Charles Tate	3,427	2.19
Total votes		156,407	100.00
Turnout			
Democratic hold			

== District 36 ==
2004 California's 36th congressional district election
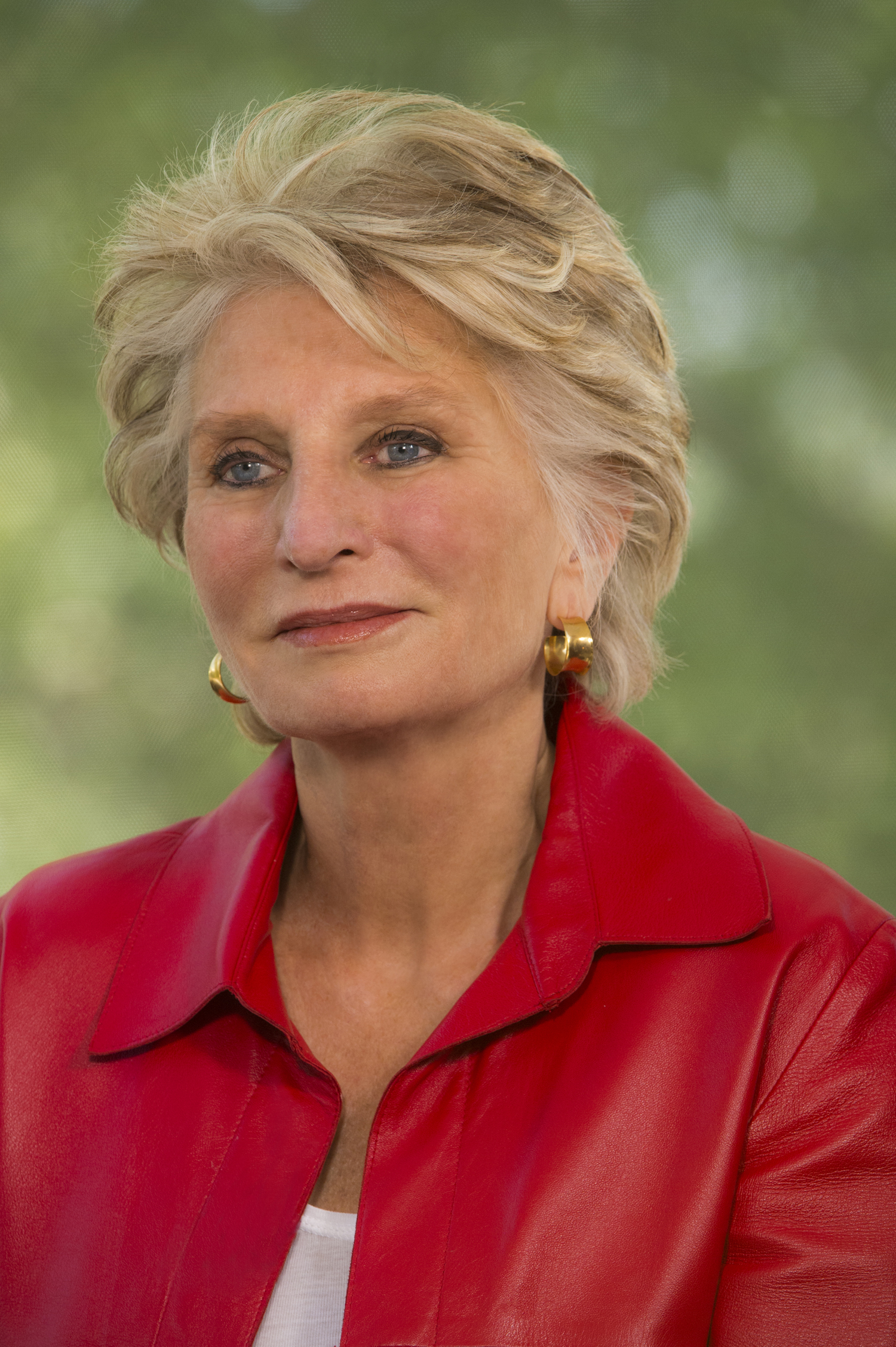

Nominee	Jane Harman	Paul Whitehead
Party	Democratic	Republican
Popular vote	151,208	81,666
Percentage	62.0%	33.5%
- County results Harman: 60–70%
U.S. Representative before election
Jane Harman
Democratic
Elected U.S. Representative
Jane Harman
Democratic

=== Predictions ===
Source	Ranking	As of
The Cook Political Report	Safe D	October 29, 2004
Sabato's Crystal Ball	Safe D	November 1, 2004

=== Results ===
California's 36th congressional district election, 2004
Party	Candidate	Votes	%
Democratic	Jane Harman (incumbent)	151,208	61.96
Republican	Paul Whitehead	81,666	33.46
Peace and Freedom	Alice Stek	6,105	2.50
Libertarian	Mike Binkley	5,065	2.08
Total votes		244,044	100.00
Turnout			
Democratic hold			

== District 37 ==
2004 California's 37th congressional district election
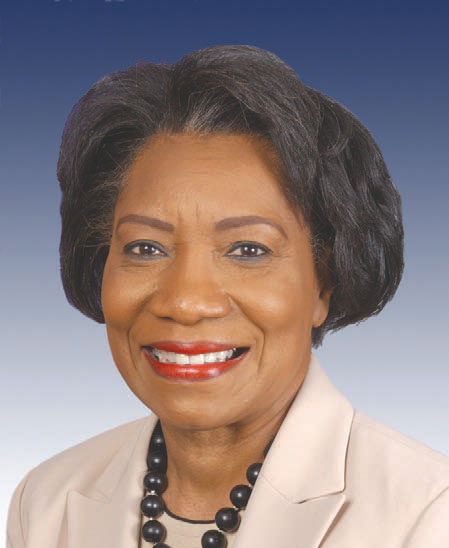

Nominee	Juanita Millender-McDonald	Vernon Van
Party	Democratic	Republican
Popular vote	118,823	31,960
Percentage	75.0%	20.2%
- County results Millender-Mcdonald: 70–80%
U.S. Representative before election
Juanita Millender-McDonald (inc.)
Democratic
Elected U.S. Representative
Juanita Millender-McDonald
Democratic

=== Predictions ===
Source	Ranking	As of
The Cook Political Report	Safe D	October 29, 2004
Sabato's Crystal Ball	Safe D	November 1, 2004

=== Results ===
California's 37th congressional district election, 2004
Party	Candidate	Votes	%
Democratic	Juanita Millender-McDonald (inc.)	118,823	75.05
Republican	Vernon Van	31,960	20.19
Libertarian	Herb Peters	7,535	4.76
Total votes		158,318	100.00
Turnout			
Democratic hold			

== District 38 ==
2004 California's 38th congressional district election
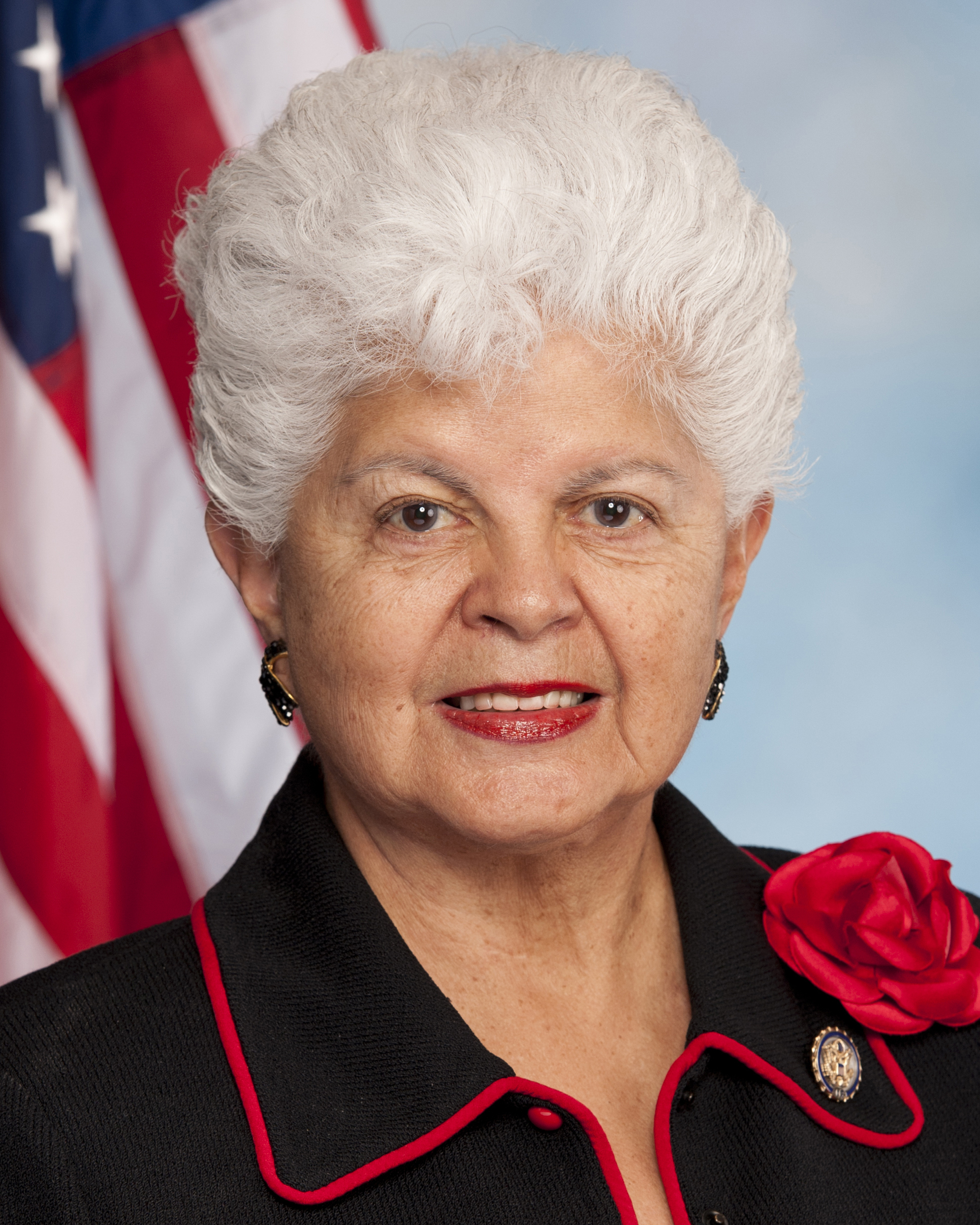
Nominee	Grace Napolitano
Party	Democratic
Popular vote	116,851
Percentage	100.0%
U.S. Representative before election
Grace Napolitano
Democratic
Elected U.S. Representative
Grace Napolitano
Democratic

=== Predictions ===
Source	Ranking	As of
The Cook Political Report	Safe D	October 29, 2004
Sabato's Crystal Ball	Safe D	November 1, 2004

=== Results ===
California's 38th congressional district election, 2004
Party	Candidate	Votes	%
Democratic	Grace Napolitano (incumbent)	116,851	100.00
Total votes		116,851	100.00
Turnout			
Democratic hold			

== District 39 ==
2004 California's 39th congressional district election
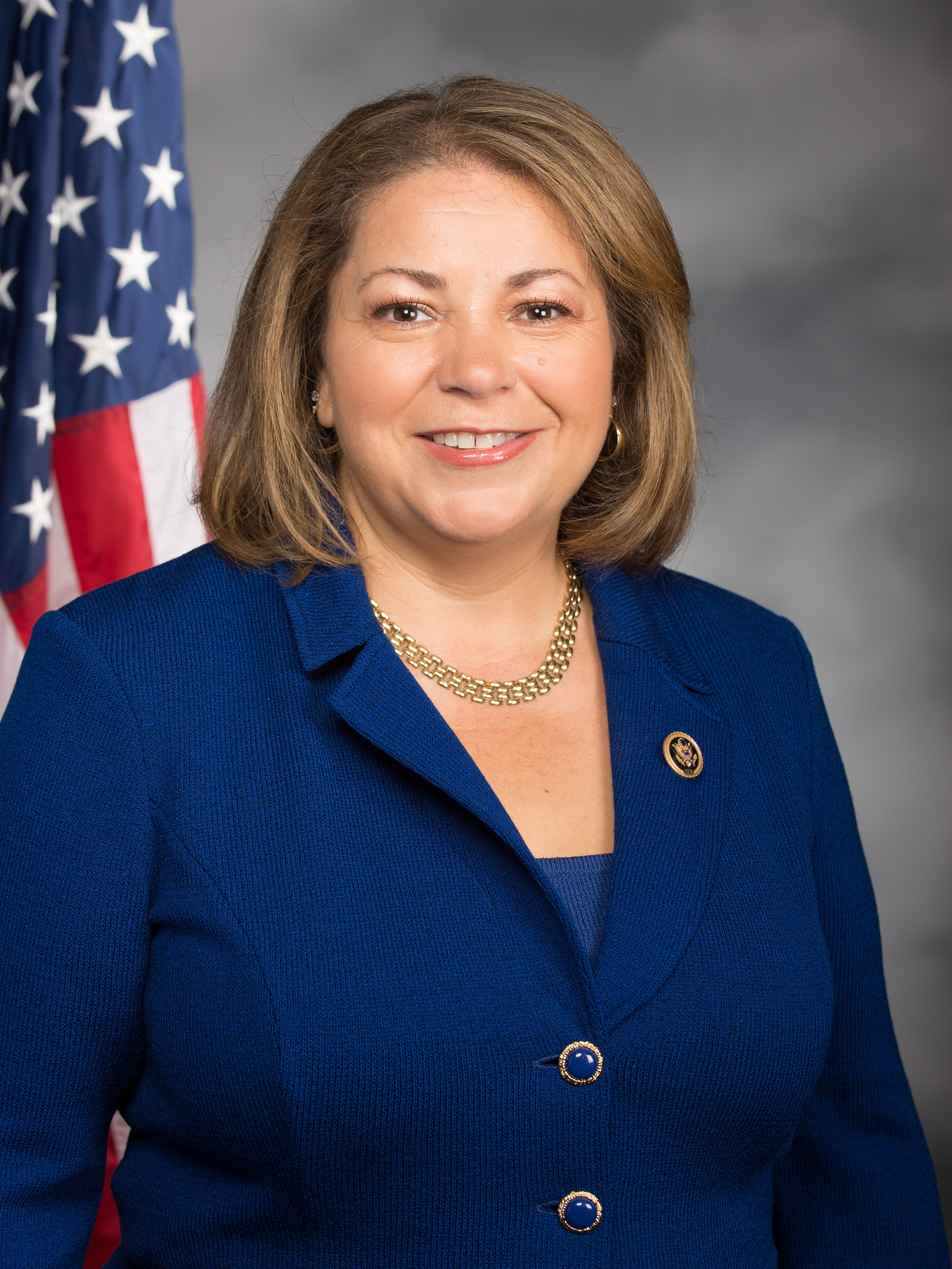

Nominee	Linda Sánchez	Tim Escobar
Party	Democratic	Republican
Popular vote	100,132	64,832
Percentage	60.7%	39.3%
- County results Sanchez: 60–70%
U.S. Representative before election
Linda Sánchez
Democratic
Elected U.S. Representative
Linda Sánchez
Democratic

California's 39th congressional district election, 2004
Party	Candidate	Votes	%
Democratic	Linda Sánchez (incumbent)	100,132	60.70
Republican	Tim Escobar	64,832	39.30
Total votes		164,964	100.00
Turnout			
Democratic hold			

== District 40 ==
2004 California's 40th congressional district election
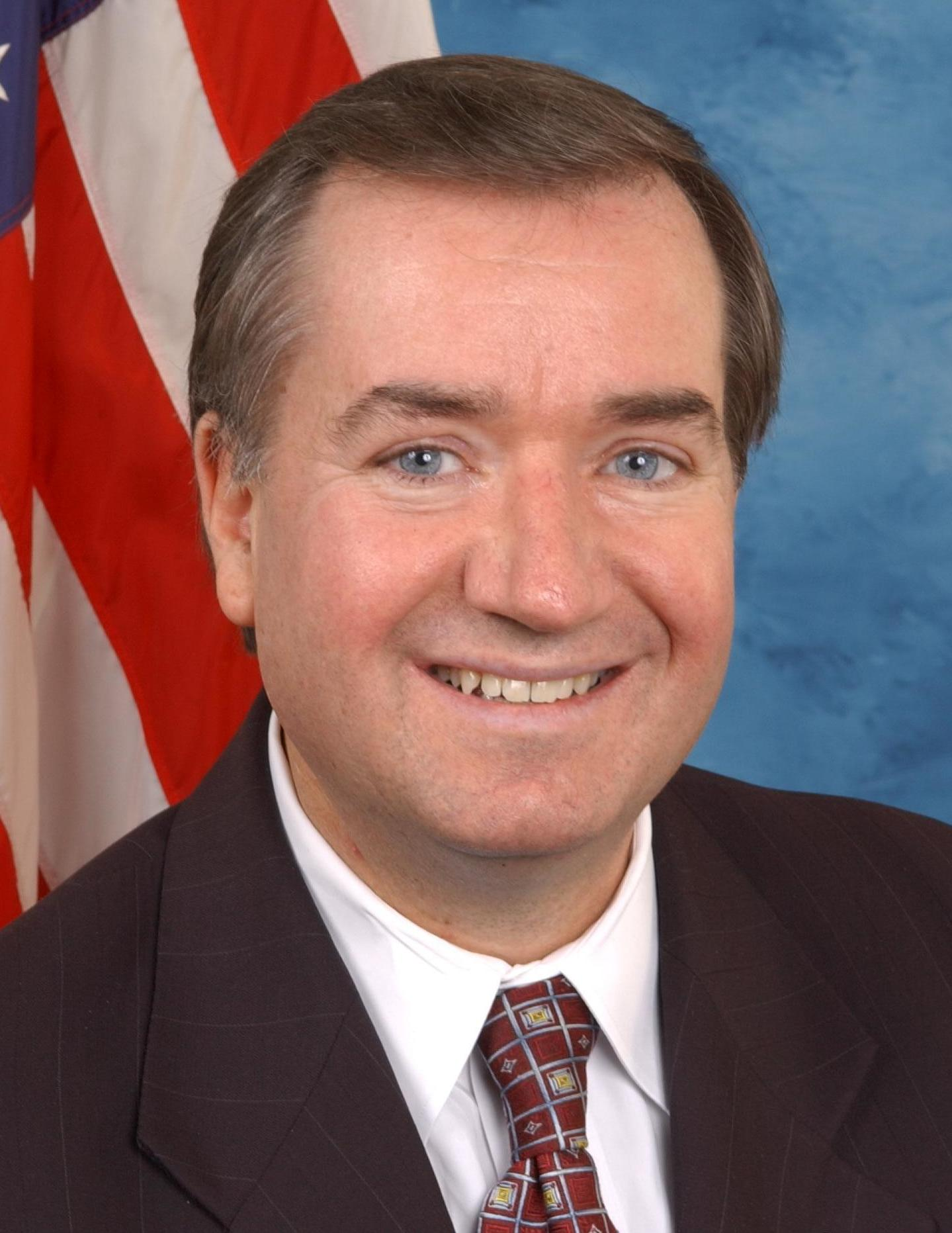

Nominee	Ed Royce	J. Tillman Williams
Party	Republican	Democratic
Popular vote	147,617	69,684
Percentage	67.9%	32.1%
- County results Royce: 60–70%
U.S. Representative before election
Ed Royce
Republican
Elected U.S. Representative
Ed Royce
Republican

=== Predictions ===
Source	Ranking	As of
The Cook Political Report	Safe R	October 29, 2004
Sabato's Crystal Ball	Safe R	November 1, 2004

=== Results ===
California's 40th congressional district election, 2004
Party	Candidate	Votes	%
Republican	Ed Royce (incumbent)	147,617	67.93
Democratic	J. Tillman Williams	69,684	32.07
Total votes		217,301	100.00
Turnout			
Republican hold			

== District 41 ==
2004 California's 41st congressional district election
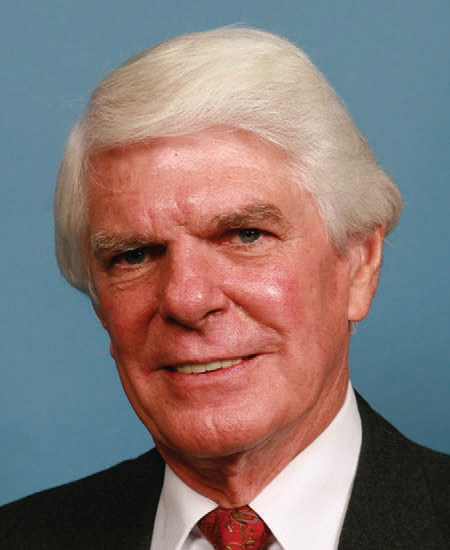

Nominee	Jerry Lewis	Peymon Mottahedeh
Party	Republican	Libertarian
Popular vote	181,605	37,332
Percentage	83.0%	17.1%
- County results Lewis: 70–80% 80–90%
U.S. Representative before election
Jerry Lewis
Republican
Elected U.S. Representative
Jerry Lewis
Republican

=== Predictions ===
Source	Ranking	As of
The Cook Political Report	Safe R	October 29, 2004
Sabato's Crystal Ball	Safe R	November 1, 2004

=== Results ===
California's 41st congressional district election, 2004
Party	Candidate	Votes	%
Republican	Jerry Lewis (incumbent)	181,605	82.95
Libertarian	Peymon Mottahedeh	37,332	17.05
Total votes		218,937	100.00
Turnout			
Republican hold			

== District 42 ==
2004 California's 42nd congressional district election
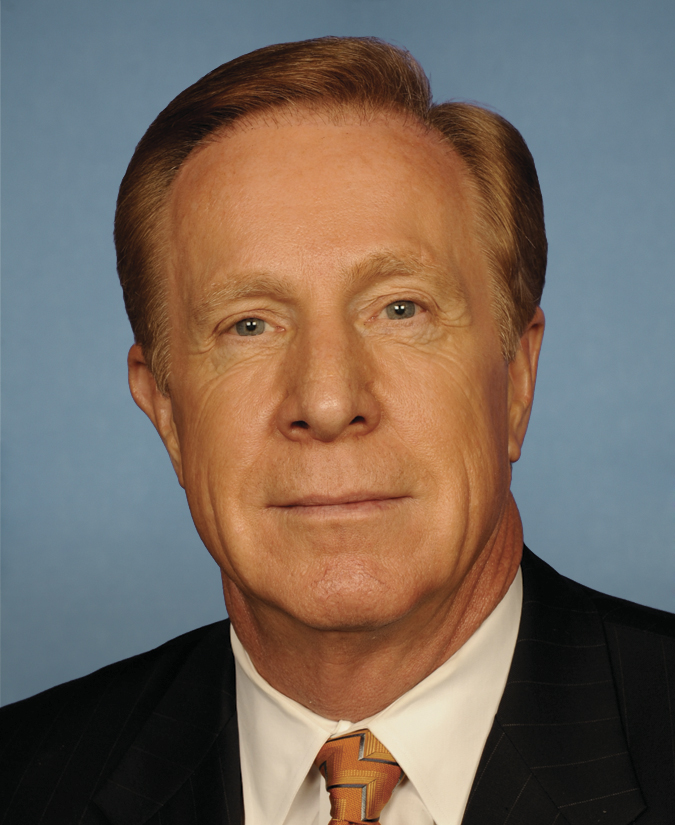

Nominee	Gary Miller	Lewis Myers
Party	Republican	Democratic
Popular vote	167,632	78,393
Percentage	68.1%	31.9%
- County results Miller: 60–70% 70–80%
U.S. Representative before election
Gary Miller
Republican
Elected U.S. Representative
Gary Miller
Republican

=== Predictions ===
Source	Ranking	As of
The Cook Political Report	Safe R	October 29, 2004
Sabato's Crystal Ball	Safe R	November 1, 2004

=== Results ===
California's 42nd congressional district election, 2004
Party	Candidate	Votes	%
Republican	Gary Miller (incumbent)	167,632	68.14
Democratic	Lewis Myers	78,393	31.86
Total votes		246,025	100.00
Turnout			
Republican hold			

== District 43 ==
2004 California's 43rd congressional district election
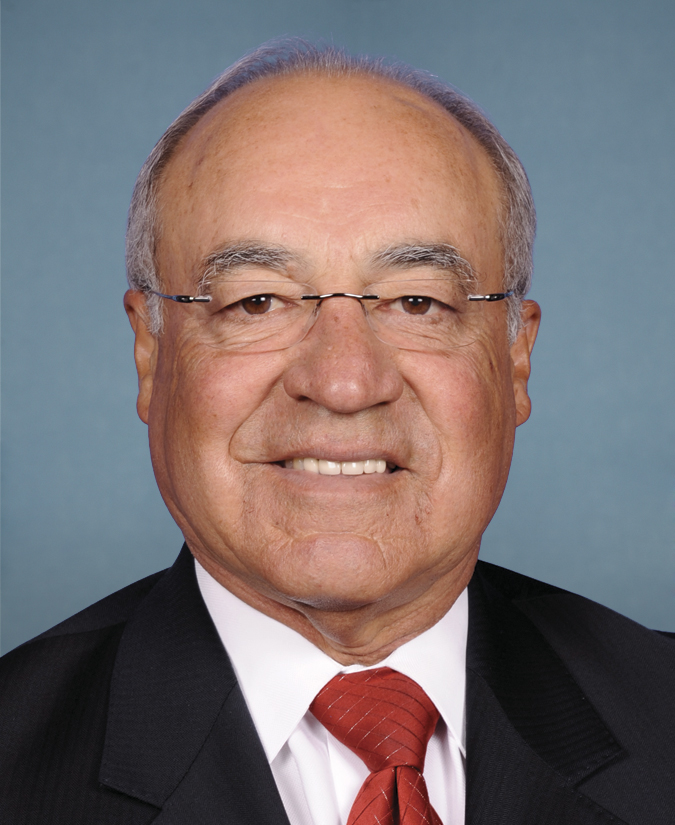

Nominee	Joe Baca	Ed Laning
Party	Democratic	Republican
Popular vote	86,830	44,004
Percentage	66.4%	33.6%
- County results Baca: 60–70%
U.S. Representative before election
Joe Baca
Democratic
Elected U.S. Representative
Joe Baca
Democratic

=== Predictions ===
Source	Ranking	As of
The Cook Political Report	Safe D	October 29, 2004
Sabato's Crystal Ball	Safe D	November 1, 2004

=== Results ===
California's 43rd congressional district election, 2004
Party	Candidate	Votes	%
Democratic	Joe Baca (incumbent)	86,830	66.37
Republican	Ed Laning	44,004	33.63
No party	Barry J. Patts (write-in)	0	0.00
Total votes		130,834	100.00
Turnout			
Democratic hold			

== District 44 ==
2004 California's 44th congressional district election
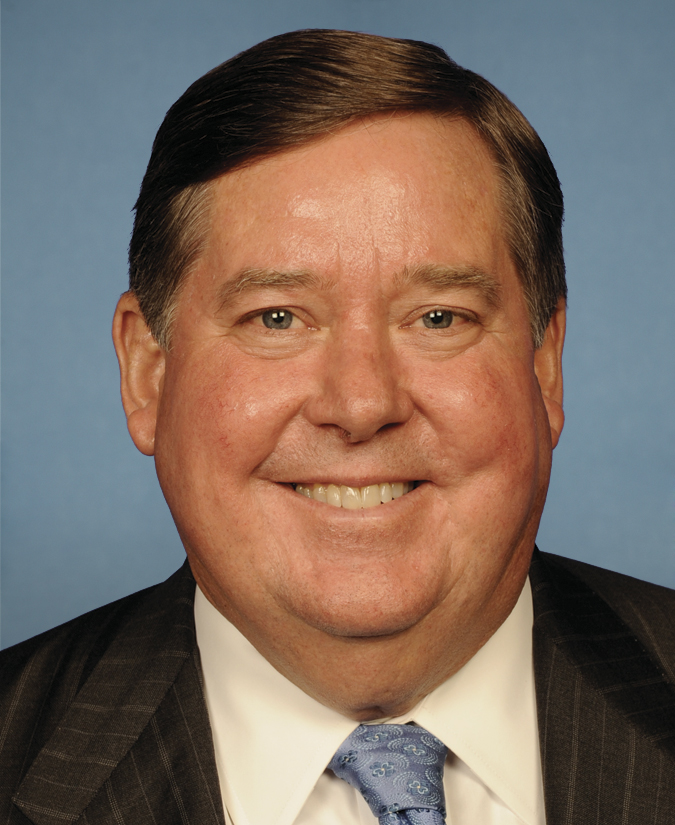

Nominee	Ken Calvert	Louis Vandenburg
Party	Republican	Democratic
Popular vote	138,768	78,796
Percentage	61.6%	35.0%
- County results Calvert: 50–60% 70–80%
U.S. Representative before election
Ken Calvert
Republican
Elected U.S. Representative
Ken Calvert
Republican

=== Predictions ===
Source	Ranking	As of
The Cook Political Report	Safe R	October 29, 2004
Sabato's Crystal Ball	Safe R	November 1, 2004

=== Results ===
California's 44th congressional district election, 2004
Party	Candidate	Votes	%
Republican	Ken Calvert (incumbent)	138,768	61.64
Democratic	Louis Vandenburg	78,796	35.00
Peace and Freedom	Kevin Akin	7,559	3.36
Total votes		225,123	100.00
Turnout			
Republican hold			

== District 45 ==
2004 California's 45th congressional district election
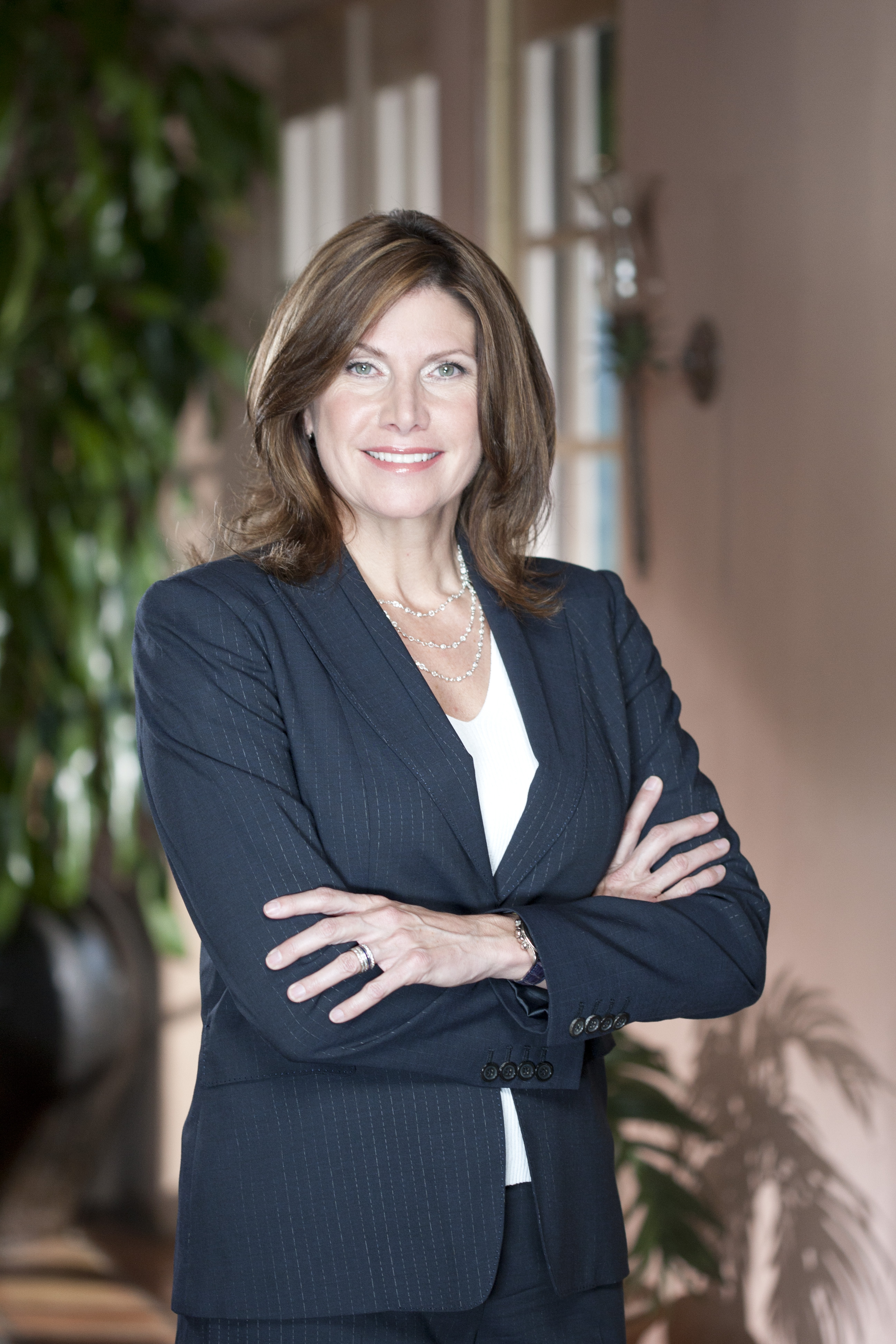

Nominee	Mary Bono	Richard J. Meyer
Party	Republican	Democratic
Popular vote	153,523	76,967
Percentage	66.6%	33.4%
- County results Bono: 60–70%
U.S. Representative before election
Mary Bono
Republican
Elected U.S. Representative
Mary Bono
Republican

=== Predictions ===
Source	Ranking	As of
The Cook Political Report	Safe R	October 29, 2004
Sabato's Crystal Ball	Safe R	November 1, 2004

=== Results ===
California's 45th congressional district election, 2004
Party	Candidate	Votes	%
Republican	Mary Bono (incumbent)	153,523	66.61
Democratic	Richard J. Meyer	76,967	33.39
Total votes		230,490	100.00
Turnout			
Republican hold			

== District 46 ==
2004 California's 46th congressional district election
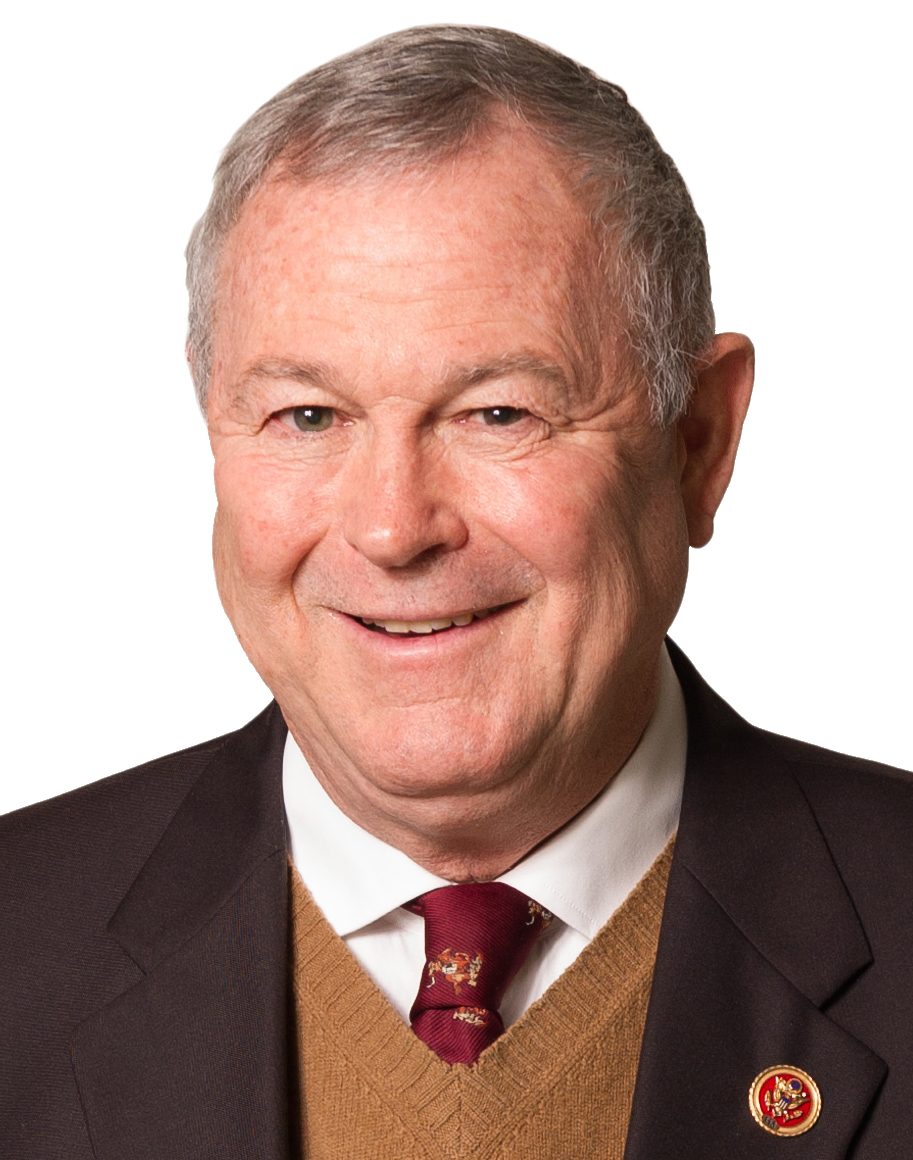

Nominee	Dana Rohrabacher	Jim Brandt
Party	Republican	Democratic
Popular vote	171,318	90,129
Percentage	61.9%	32.6%
- County results Rohrabacher: 50–60% 60–70%
U.S. Representative before election
Dana Rohrabacher
Republican
Elected U.S. Representative
Dana Rohrabacher
Republican

=== Predictions ===
Source	Ranking	As of
The Cook Political Report	Safe R	October 29, 2004
Sabato's Crystal Ball	Safe R	November 1, 2004

=== Results ===
California's 46th congressional district election, 2004
Party	Candidate	Votes	%
Republican	Dana Rohrabacher (incumbent)	171,318	61.92
Democratic	Jim Brandt	90,129	32.57
Green	Tom Lash	10,238	3.70
Libertarian	Keith Gann	5,005	1.81
Total votes		276,690	100.00
Turnout			
Republican hold			

== District 47 ==
2004 California's 47th congressional district election
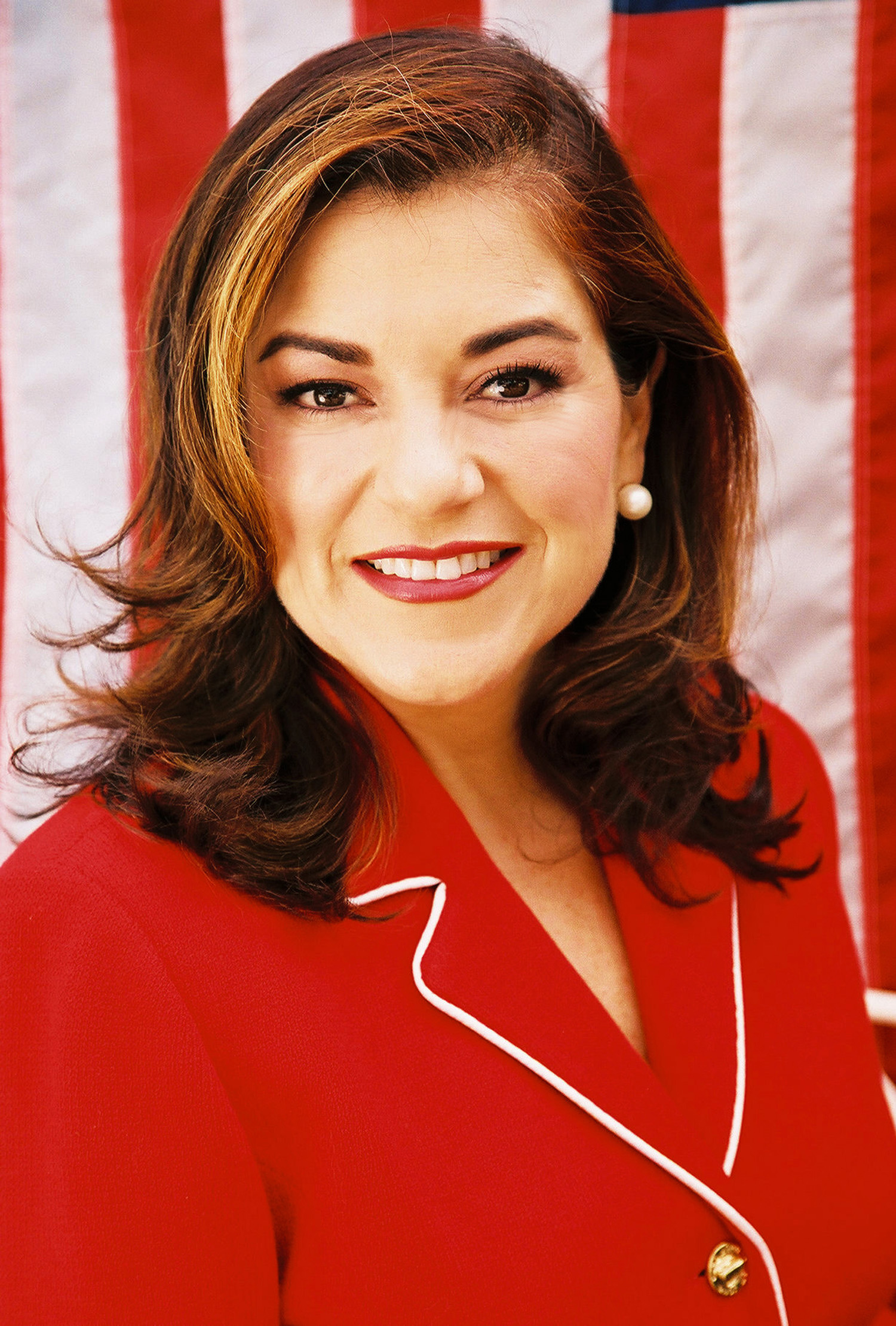

Nominee	Loretta Sanchez	Alexandria A. "Alex" Coronado
Party	Democratic	Republican
Popular vote	65,684	43,099
Percentage	60.4%	39.6%
- County results Sanchez: 60–70%
U.S. Representative before election
Loretta Sanchez
Democratic
Elected U.S. Representative
Loretta Sanchez
Democratic

=== Predictions ===
Source	Ranking	As of
The Cook Political Report	Safe D	October 29, 2004
Sabato's Crystal Ball	Safe D	November 1, 2004

=== Results ===
California's 47th congressional district election, 2004
Party	Candidate	Votes	%
Democratic	Loretta Sanchez (incumbent)	65,684	60.38
Republican	Alexandria A. "Alex" Coronado	43,099	39.62
Total votes		108,783	100.00
Turnout			
Democratic hold			

== District 48 ==
2004 California's 48th congressional district election
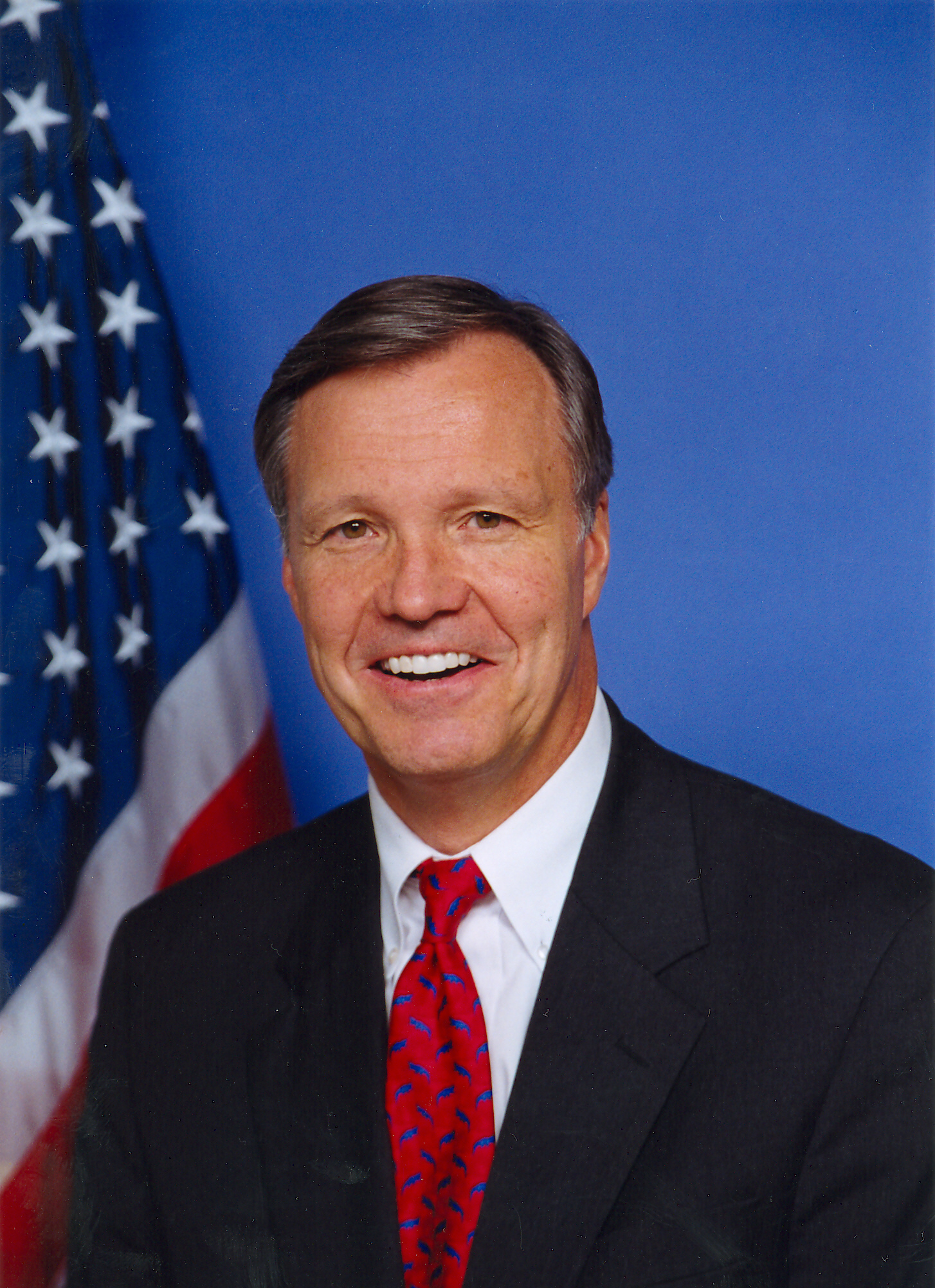

Nominee	Christopher Cox	John Graham
Party	Republican	Democratic
Popular vote	189,004	93,525
Percentage	65.0%	32.1%
- County results Cox: 60–70%
U.S. Representative before election
Christopher Cox
Republican
Elected U.S. Representative
Christopher Cox
Republican

=== Predictions ===
Source	Ranking	As of
The Cook Political Report	Safe R	October 29, 2004
Sabato's Crystal Ball	Safe R	November 1, 2004

=== Results ===
California's 48th congressional district election, 2004
Party	Candidate	Votes	%
Republican	Christopher Cox (incumbent)	189,004	64.98
Democratic	John Graham	93,525	32.15
Libertarian	Bruce Cohen	8,343	2.87
Total votes		290,872	100.00
Turnout			
Republican hold			

== District 49 ==
2004 California's 49th congressional district election
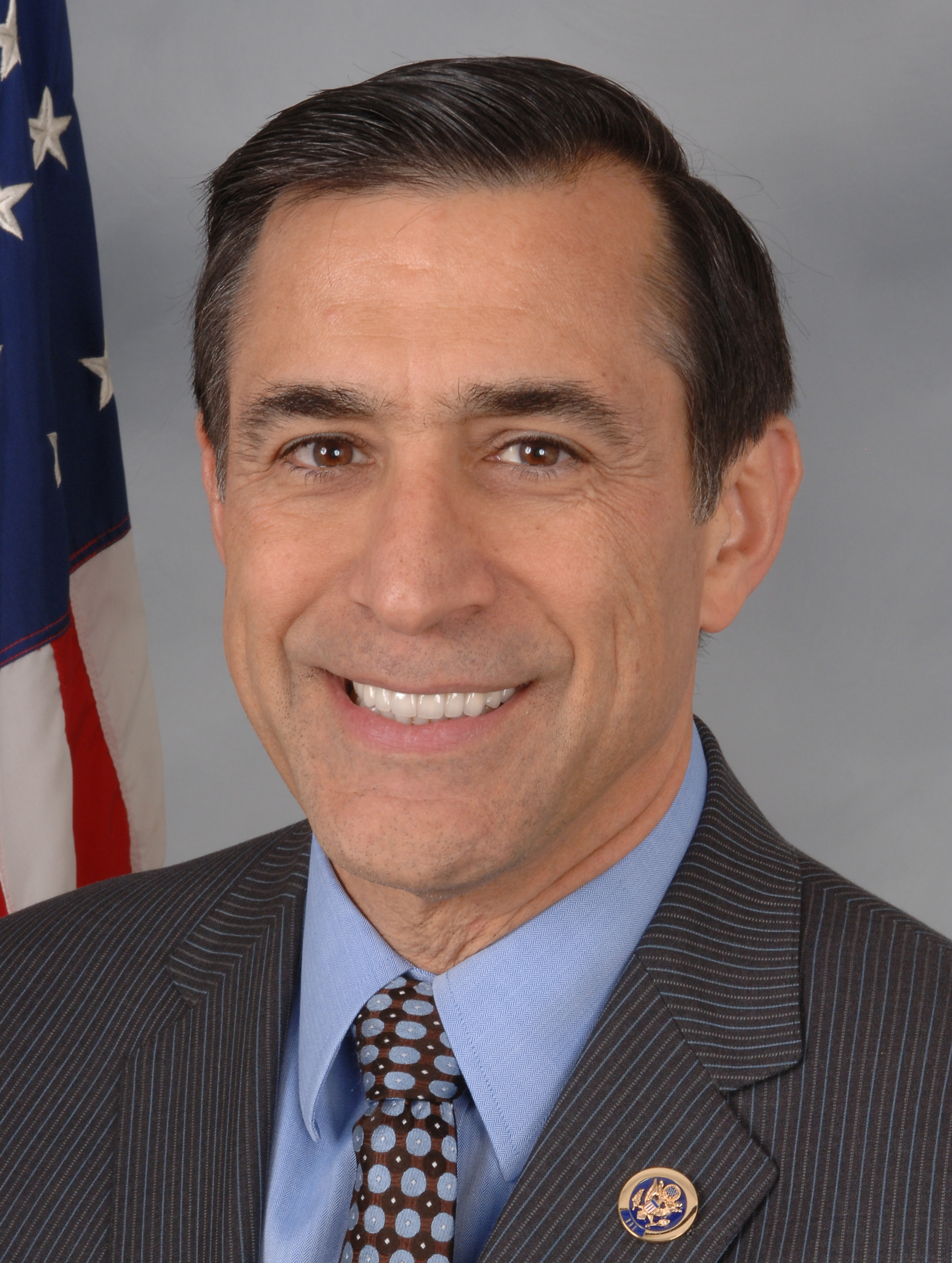

Nominee	Darrell Issa	Michael P. Byron
Party	Republican	Democratic
Popular vote	141,658	79,057
Percentage	62.5%	34.9%
- County results Issa: 60–70%
U.S. Representative before election
Darrell Issa
Republican
Elected U.S. Representative
Darrell Issa
Republican

=== Predictions ===
Source	Ranking	As of
The Cook Political Report	Safe R	October 29, 2004
Sabato's Crystal Ball	Safe R	November 1, 2004

=== Results ===
California's 49th congressional district election, 2004
Party	Candidate	Votes	%
Republican	Darrell Issa (incumbent)	141,658	62.55
Democratic	Michael P. Byron	79,057	34.91
Libertarian	Lars R. Grossmith	5,751	2.54
Total votes		226,466	100.00
Turnout			
Republican hold			

== District 50 ==
2004 California's 50th congressional district election
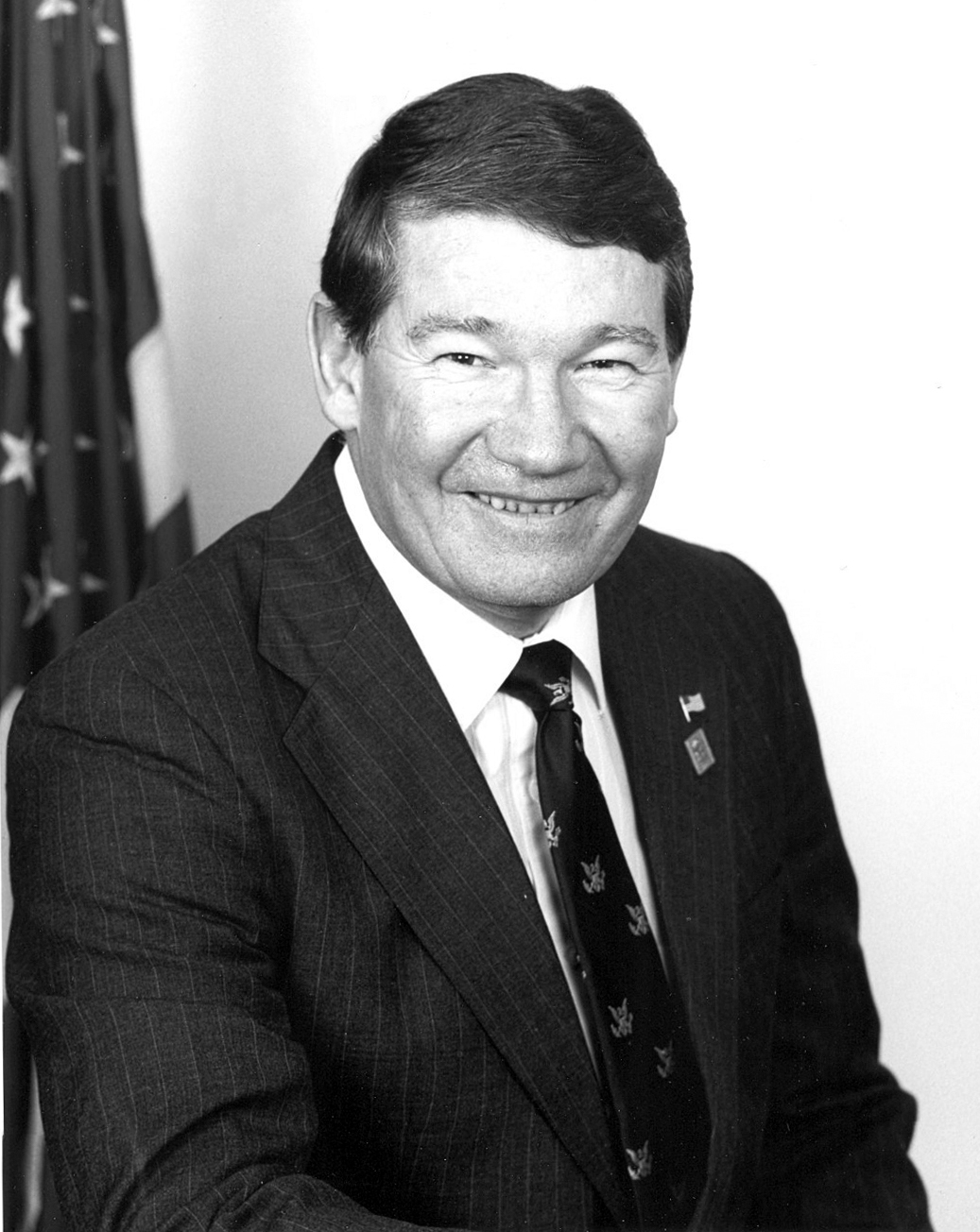

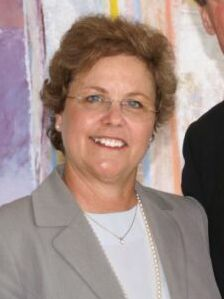
Nominee	Duke Cunningham	Francine Busby
Party	Republican	Democratic
Popular vote	169,025	105,590
Percentage	58.4%	36.5%
- County results Cunningham: 50–60%
U.S. Representative before election
Duke Cunningham
Republican
Elected U.S. Representative
Duke Cunningham
Republican

=== Predictions ===
Source	Ranking	As of
The Cook Political Report	Safe R	October 29, 2004
Sabato's Crystal Ball	Safe R	November 1, 2004

=== Results ===
California's 50th congressional district election, 2004
Party	Candidate	Votes	%
Republican	Duke Cunningham (incumbent)	169,025	58.42
Democratic	Francine Busby	105,590	36.49
Green	Gary M. Waayers	6,504	2.25
American Independent	Diane Beall Templin	4,723	1.63
Libertarian	Brandon C. Osborne	3,486	1.20
Total votes		289,328	100.00
Turnout			
Republican hold			

== District 51 ==
2004 California's 51st congressional district election
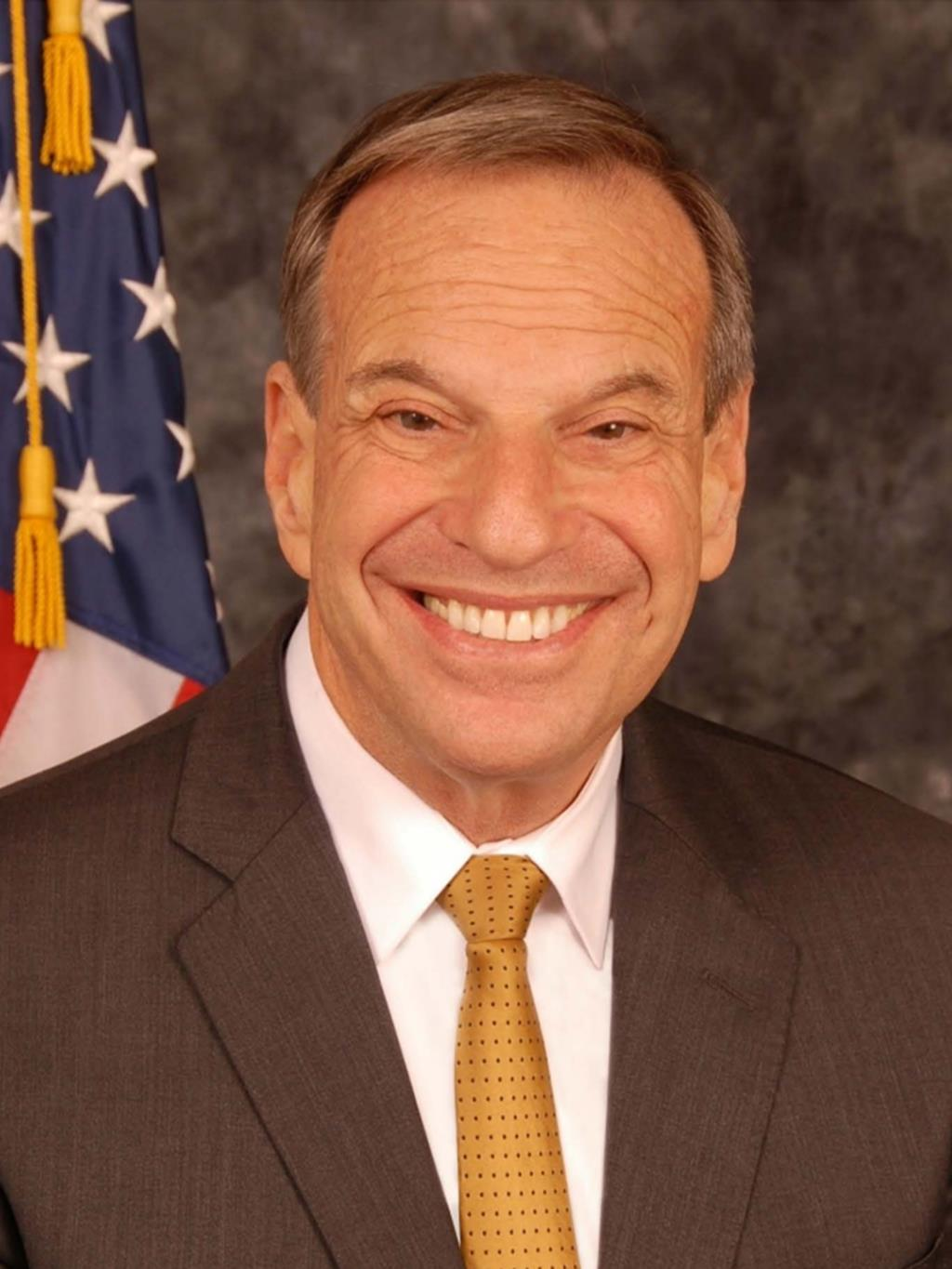

Nominee	Bob Filner	Michael Giorgino
Party	Democratic	Republican
Popular vote	111,441	63,526
Percentage	61.6%	35.1%
- County results Filner: 50–60% 60–70%
U.S. Representative before election
Bob Filner
Democratic
Elected U.S. Representative
Bob Filner
Democratic

=== Predictions ===
Source	Ranking	As of
The Cook Political Report	Safe D	October 29, 2004
Sabato's Crystal Ball	Safe D	November 1, 2004

=== Results ===
California's 51st congressional district election, 2004
Party	Candidate	Votes	%
Democratic	Bob Filner (incumbent)	111,441	61.61
Republican	Michael Giorgino	63,526	35.12
Libertarian	Michael S. Metti	5,912	3.27
Total votes		180,879	100.00
Turnout			
Democratic hold			

== District 52 ==
2004 California's 52nd congressional district election
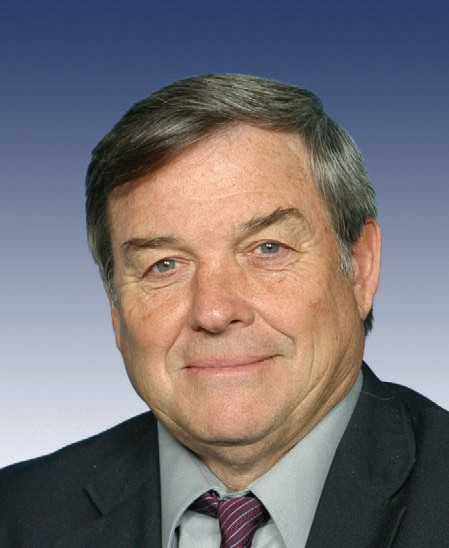

Nominee	Duncan Hunter	Brian S. Keliher
Party	Republican	Democratic
Popular vote	187,799	74,857
Percentage	69.2%	27.6%
- County results Hunter: 60–70%
U.S. Representative before election
Duncan Hunter
Republican
Elected U.S. Representative
Duncan Hunter
Republican

=== Predictions ===
Source	Ranking	As of
The Cook Political Report	Safe R	October 29, 2004
Sabato's Crystal Ball	Safe R	November 1, 2004

=== Results ===
California's 52nd congressional district election, 2004
Party	Candidate	Votes	%
Republican	Duncan Hunter (incumbent)	187,799	69.19
Democratic	Brian S. Keliher	74,857	27.58
Libertarian	Michael Benoit	8,782	3.24
Total votes		271,438	100.00
Turnout			
Republican hold			

== District 53 ==
2004 California's 53rd congressional district election
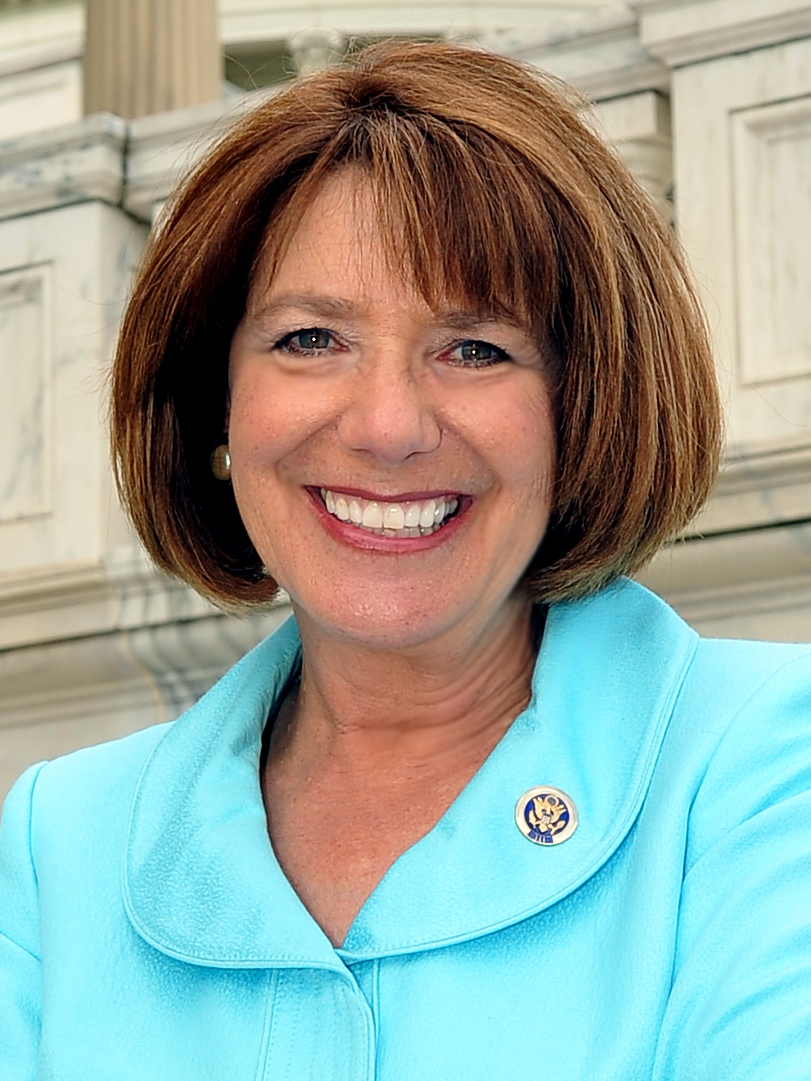

Nominee	Susan Davis	David Hunzeker
Party	Democratic	Republican
Popular vote	146,449	63,897
Percentage	66.1%	28.9%
- County results Davis: 60–70%
U.S. Representative before election
Susan Davis
Democratic
Elected U.S. Representative
Susan Davis
Democratic

=== Predictions ===
Source	Ranking	As of
The Cook Political Report	Safe D	October 29, 2004
Sabato's Crystal Ball	Safe D	November 1, 2004

=== Results ===
California's 53rd congressional district election, 2004
Party	Candidate	Votes	%
Democratic	Susan Davis (incumbent)	146,449	66.14
Republican	David Hunzeker	63,897	28.86
Green	Lawrence P. Rockwood	7,523	3.40
Libertarian	Adam Van Susteren	3,567	1.61
Total votes		221,436	100.00
Turnout			
Democratic hold			

== See also ==
- 109th United States Congress
- Political party strength in California
- Political party strength in U.S. states
- United States House of Representatives elections, 2004
