= California's 2nd State Assembly district =

American legislative district

Current assemblymember
Chris Rogers; D–Santa Rosa
- Population (2020): 506,650
- Demographics: 63.0% White; 1.3% Black; 22.3% Latino; 3.4% Asian; 3.0% Native American; 0.3% Hawaiian/Pacific Islander; 0.7% other; 6.1% remainder of multiracial
- Registration: 50.82% Democratic; 21.22% Republican; 19.67% No party preference

California's 2nd State Assembly district is one of 80 California State Assembly districts. It is currently represented by Democrat Chris Rogers of Santa Rosa.

== District profile ==
The district encompasses the North Coast, stretching from the Oregon border to Bodega Bay and Santa Rosa with the district being primarily rural and suburban. At 12,489 square miles, it's the fourth largest assembly district by area, and the largest to be represented by a Democrat.

All of Del Norte County

- Crescent City

All of Humboldt County

- Arcata
- Blue Lake
- Eureka
- Ferndale
- Fortuna
- Rio Dell
- Trinidad

All of Mendocino County

- Fort Bragg
- Point Arena
- Ukiah
- Willits

Sonoma County – 48.01%

- Bodega Bay
- Cloverdale
- Healdsburg
- Santa Rosa – 64.69%
- Sebastopol
- Windsor

All of Trinity County

- Weaverville

== Election results from statewide races ==
Year	Office	Results
2024	President	Harris 65.5 - 30.7%
2021	Recall	No 64.6 – 35.4%
2020	President	Biden 63.5 - 34.3%
2018	Governor	Newsom 66.4 – 33.6%
2018	Senator	Feinstein 50.6 – 49.4%
2016	President	Clinton 62.2 – 29.0%
2016	Senator	Harris 70.2 – 29.8%
2014	Governor	Brown 68.8 – 31.2%
2012	President	Obama 64.7 – 30.5%
2012	Senator	Feinstein 68.1 – 31.9%

== List of assembly members representing the district ==
Due to redistricting, the 2nd district has been moved around different parts of the state. The current iteration resulted from the 2021 redistricting by the California Citizens Redistricting Commission.

Assembly members	Party	Years served	Counties represented	Notes
Joseph Russ	Republican	January 5, 1885 – January 3, 1887	Humboldt	
George Williams	Republican	January 3, 1887 – January 7, 1889	Humboldt	
J. G. Murray	Republican	January 7, 1889 – January 5, 1891	Humboldt	
Anthony Jennings Bledsoe	Republican	January 5, 1891 – January 4, 1897	Humboldt	
A. W. Hill	Republican	January 4, 1897 – January 2, 1899	Humboldt	
G. D. Marvin	Republican	January 2, 1899 – January 5, 1901	Humboldt	
Melvin Parker Roberts	Republican	January 5, 1901 – January 5, 1903	Humboldt	
George Thomas Rolley	Republican	January 5, 1903 – January 7, 1907	Humboldt	
Charles Pryde Cutten	Republican	January 7, 1907 – January 4, 1909	Humboldt	
William Kehoe	Republican	January 4, 1909 – January 6, 1913	Humboldt	
Hans Christian Nelson	Republican	January 6, 1913 – January 2, 1915	Humboldt	
John Francis Quinn	Democratic	January 2, 1915 – January 6, 1919	Humboldt	
Frank J. Cummings	Republican	January 6, 1919 – July 14, 1922	Humboldt	Died in office.
Vacant		July 14, 1922 – January 8, 1923	Humboldt	
Frederick John Moore Sr.	Republican	January 8, 1923 – January 5, 1925	Humboldt	
John W. Runner	Republican	January 5, 1925 – January 3, 1927	Humboldt	
Robert F. Fisher	Republican	January 3, 1927 – January 5, 1931	Humboldt	
Henry M. McGuinness	Democratic	January 5, 1931 – January 2, 1933	Modoc, Shasta, Siskiyou, Trinity	
Albert Frederick Ross Jr.	Republican	January 2, 1933 – January 7, 1935	Lassen, Modoc, Plumas, Shasta, Sierra, Siskiyou, Trinity	
Clinton J. Fulcher	Democratic	January 7, 1935 – January 6, 1941	Lassen, Modoc, Plumas, Shasta, Sierra, Siskiyou, Trinity	
William I. Gunlock	Democratic	January 6, 1941 – January 4, 1943	Lassen, Modoc, Plumas, Shasta, Sierra, Siskiyou, Trinity	
Paul Denny	Republican	January 4, 1943 – January 6, 1947	Lassen, Modoc, Plumas, Shasta, Sierra, Siskiyou, Trinity	
Lester Thomas Davis	Democratic	January 6, 1947 – May 3, 1952	Lassen, Modoc, Plumas, Shasta, Sierra, Siskiyou, Trinity	Died in office. He was eventually succeeded by his wife.
Vacant		May 3, 1952 – January 5, 1953	Lassen, Modoc, Plumas, Shasta, Sierra, Siskiyou, Trinity	
Pauline Davis	Democratic	January 5, 1953 – January 2, 1967	Lassen, Modoc, Plumas, Shasta, Sierra, Siskiyou, Trinity	On January 7, 1963, during the next session, Tehama County was included in her district, during redistricting.
Pauline Davis	Democratic	January 5, 1953 – January 2, 1967	Lassen, Modoc, Plumas, Shasta, Sierra, Siskiyou, Tehama, Trinity	On January 7, 1963, during the next session, Tehama County was included in her district, during redistricting.
Frank Belotti	Republican	January 2, 1967 – January 1, 1973	Humboldt, Mendocino, Sonoma	
Barry Keene	Democratic	January 1, 1973 – November 30, 1978	Humboldt, Mendocino, Sonoma	On December 2, 1974, during the next session, Lake and Del Norte counties were also included during redistricting.
Barry Keene	Democratic	January 1, 1973 – November 30, 1978	Humboldt, Mendocino, Sonoma, Lake, Del Norte	On December 2, 1974, during the next session, Lake and Del Norte counties were also included during redistricting.
Douglas Bosco	Democratic	December 4, 1978 – November 30, 1982	Humboldt, Mendocino, Sonoma, Lake, Del Norte	
Dan Hauser	Democratic	December 6, 1982 – November 30, 1992	Humboldt, Mendocino, Sonoma, Del Norte	
Stan Statham	Republican	December 7, 1992 – November 30, 1994	Butte, Colusa, Glenn, Shasta, Siskiyou, Sutter, Tehama, Trinity, Yolo	
Tom Woods	Republican	December 5, 1994 – November 30, 1998	Butte, Colusa, Glenn, Shasta, Siskiyou, Sutter, Tehama, Trinity, Yolo	
Dick Dickerson	Republican	December 7, 1998 – November 30, 2002	Butte, Colusa, Glenn, Shasta, Siskiyou, Sutter, Tehama, Trinity, Yolo	Yolo County was not included in his district during the last two years of being in office.
Doug LaMalfa	Republican	December 2, 2002 – November 30, 2008	Butte, Colusa, Glenn, Modoc, Shasta, Siskiyou, Sutter, Tehama, Yolo	
Jim Nielsen	Republican	December 1, 2008 – November 30, 2012	Butte, Colusa, Glenn, Modoc, Shasta, Siskiyou, Sutter, Tehama, Yolo	
Wesley Chesbro	Democratic	December 3, 2012 – November 30, 2014	Del Norte, Humbdolt, Mendocino, Sonoma, Trinity	
Jim Wood	Democratic	December 1, 2014 – November 30, 2024	Del Norte, Humbdolt, Mendocino, Sonoma, Trinity	
Chris Rogers	Democratic	December 2, 2024 – present	Del Norte, Humbdolt, Mendocino, Sonoma, Trinity	

== Election results (1990-present) ==
=== 2024 ===
2024 California State Assembly 2nd district election
Primary election
Party	Candidate	Votes	%
Republican	Michael Greer	39,052	27.6
Democratic	Chris Rogers	27,291	19.3
Democratic	Rusty Hicks	25,962	18.3
Democratic	Ariel Kelley	19,740	14.0
Democratic	Frankie Myers	18,065	12.8
Democratic	Ted Williams	9,803	6.9
Democratic	Cynthia Click	1,575	1.1
Total votes		141,488	100.0
General election
Democratic	Chris Rogers	154,845	65.9
Republican	Michael Greer	80,290	34.1
Total votes		235,135	100.0
Democratic hold			

=== 2022 ===
2022 California State Assembly 2nd district election
Primary election
Party	Candidate	Votes	%
Democratic	Jim Wood (incumbent)	92,411	71.1
Republican	Charlotte Svolos	37,636	28.9
Total votes		130,047	100.0
General election
Democratic	Jim Wood (incumbent)	129,356	68.9
Republican	Charlotte Svolos	58,330	31.1
Total votes		187,686	100.0
Democratic hold			

=== 2020 ===
2020 California State Assembly 2nd district election
Primary election
Party	Candidate	Votes	%
Democratic	Jim Wood (incumbent)	112,839	70.8
Republican	Charlotte Svolos	46,439	29.2
Total votes		159,278	100.0
General election
Democratic	Jim Wood (incumbent)	162,287	68.5
Republican	Charlotte Svolos	74,582	31.5
Total votes		236,869	100.0
Democratic hold			

=== 2018 ===
2018 California State Assembly 2nd district election
Primary election
Party	Candidate	Votes	%
Democratic	Jim Wood (incumbent)	80,178	69.6
Republican	Matt Heath	34,975	30.4
Total votes		115,153	100.0
General election
Democratic	Jim Wood (incumbent)	128,444	69.4
Republican	Matt Heath	56,549	30.6
Total votes		184,993	100.0
Democratic hold			

=== 2016 ===
2016 California State Assembly 2nd district election
Primary election
Party	Candidate	Votes	%
Democratic	Jim Wood (incumbent)	102,308	99.9
Libertarian	Ken Anton (write-in)	56	0.1
Total votes		102,364	100.0
General election
Democratic	Jim Wood (incumbent)	138,020	72.9
Libertarian	Ken Anton	51,245	27.1
Total votes		189,265	100.0
Democratic hold			

=== 2014 ===
2014 California State Assembly 2nd district election
Primary election
Party	Candidate	Votes	%
Democratic	Jim Wood	37,244	41.2
Republican	Matt Heath	28,866	31.9
Democratic	John Lowry	16,464	18.2
Green	Pamela Elizondo	7,853	8.7
Total votes		90,427	100.0
General election
Democratic	Jim Wood	85,045	65.1
Republican	Matt Heath	45,553	34.9
Total votes		130,598	100.0
Democratic hold			

=== 2012 ===
2012 California State Assembly 2nd district election
Primary election
Party	Candidate	Votes	%
Democratic	Wesley Chesbro (incumbent)	60,414	64.1
Democratic	Tom Lynch	21,536	22.9
Green	Pamela Elizondo	8,261	8.8
Democratic	Firenza Xuan Pini	4,015	4.3
Total votes		94,226	100.0
General election
Democratic	Wesley Chesbro (incumbent)	111,451	63.1
Democratic	Tom Lynch	65,302	36.9
Total votes		176,753	100.0
Democratic gain from Republican			

=== 2010 ===
2010 California State Assembly 2nd district election
Party	Candidate	Votes	%
Republican	Jim Nielsen (incumbent)	118,120	100.0
Total votes		118,120	100.0
Republican hold			

=== 2008 ===
2008 California State Assembly 2nd district election
Party	Candidate	Votes	%
Republican	Jim Nielsen	118,149	65.4
Democratic	Paul Singh	62,510	34.6
Total votes		180,659	100.0
Republican hold			

=== 2006 ===
2006 California State Assembly 2nd district election
Party	Candidate	Votes	%
Republican	Doug LaMalfa (incumbent)	95,723	68.0
Democratic	Melvin Smith	41,425	29.5
Peace and Freedom	Phil Dynan	3,474	2.5
Total votes		140,622	100.0
Republican hold			

=== 2004 ===
2004 California State Assembly 2nd district election
Party	Candidate	Votes	%
Republican	Doug LaMalfa (incumbent)	115,651	64.9
Democratic	Barbara McIver	62,643	35.1
Total votes		178,294	100.0
Republican hold			

=== 2002 ===
2002 California State Assembly 2nd district election
Party	Candidate	Votes	%
Republican	Doug LaMalfa	79,361	67.4
Democratic	Doug Kinyon	34,524	29.3
Libertarian	Pete Bret	3,996	3.3
Total votes		117,881	100.0
Republican hold			

=== 2000 ===
2000 California State Assembly 2nd district election
Party	Candidate	Votes	%
Republican	Richard Dickerson (incumbent)	104,614	68.5
Democratic	Virgil D. Parks	38,281	25.1
Libertarian	Pete Bret	4,924	3.2
Natural Law	Patrice Thiessen	4,863	3.2
Total votes		152,682	100.0
Republican hold			

=== 1998 ===
1998 California State Assembly 2nd district election
Party	Candidate	Votes	%
Republican	Richard Dickerson	71,357	56.7
Democratic	Francie L. Sullivan	50,202	39.9
Libertarian	Pete Bret	4,196	3.3
Total votes		125,755	100.0
Republican hold			

=== 1996 ===
1996 California State Assembly 2nd district election
Party	Candidate	Votes	%
Republican	Tom Woods (incumbent)	77,827	53.2
Democratic	John L. Growney	63,029	43.1
Libertarian	Al Swain	5,333	3.6
Total votes		146,189	100.0
Republican hold			

=== 1994 ===
1994 California State Assembly 2nd district election
Party	Candidate	Votes	%
Republican	Tom Woods	80,604	62.8
Democratic	James Bainbridge	42,158	32.8
Libertarian	Frederick A. Schwartz	5,508	4.3
Total votes		128,270	100.0
Republican hold			

=== 1992 ===
1992 California State Assembly 2nd district election
Party	Candidate	Votes	%
Republican	Stan Statham (incumbent)	100,961	64.9
Democratic	William "Bill" Brashears	54,639	35.1
Total votes		155,600	100.0
Republican gain from Democratic			

=== 1990 ===
1990 California State Assembly 2nd district election
Party	Candidate	Votes	%
Democratic	Dan Hauser (incumbent)	71,091	55.2
Republican	Tim Willis	40,431	31.4
Peace and Freedom	Bruce Anderson	17,204	13.4
Total votes		128,726	100.0
Democratic hold			

== See also ==
- California State Assembly
- California State Assembly districts
- Districts in California
