= Lasic =

Lasic may refer to:

- LASIK, laser eye surgery
- Lasić, Slavic surname
- Đorđije Lašić, Yugoslav Army officer
- Lasix, a diuretic medication

== See also ==
- Lassic, 19th-century indigenous American leader
- Lassik (disambiguation)
