= William I. Gunlock =

American politician (1895–1991)

Member of the California State Assembly from the 2nd district
- In office January 6, 1941 – January 4, 1943
- Preceded by: Clinton J. Fulcher
- Succeeded by: Paul Denny

Personal details
- Born: April 25, 1895 Brooklyn, New York
- Died: January 22, 1991 (aged 95) Shasta County, California
- Party: Democratic (Before 1942); Republican (1942)

William I. Gunlock (April 25, 1895 – January 22, 1991) was born in Brooklyn, New York. He served in the California legislature and represented the 2nd District from 1941 to 1943. During World War I he served in the United States Navy.
