= Yager Creek =

Stream in California, United States

Yager Creek Yaeger Creek
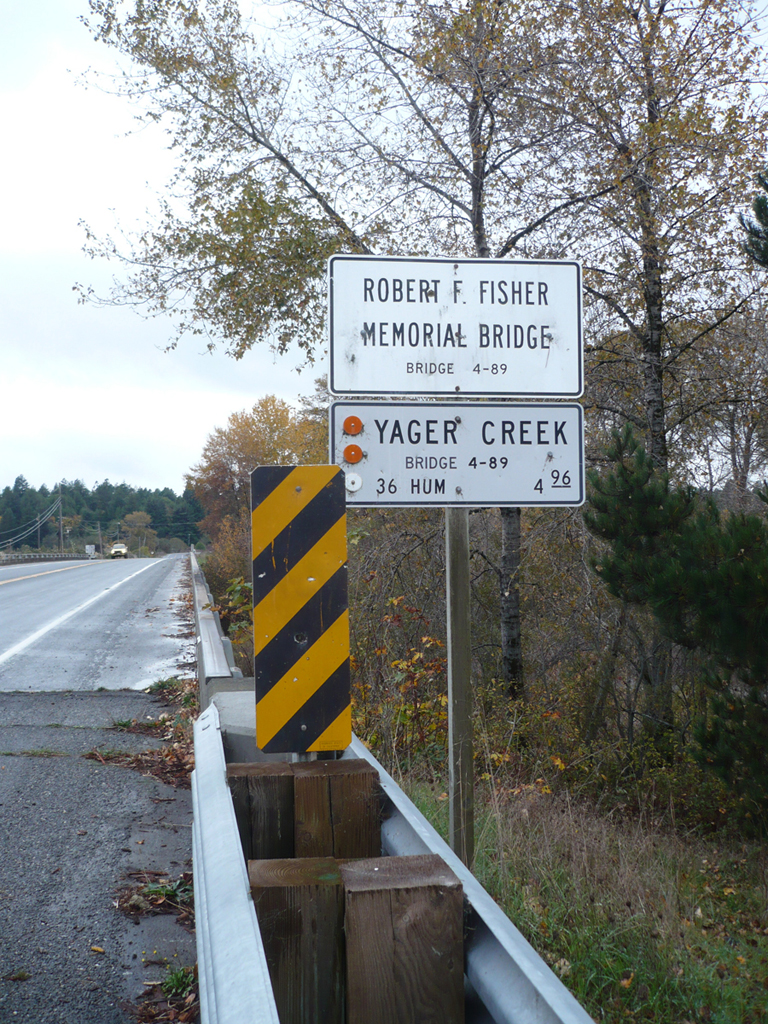
- The Robert J. Fisher bridge over Yager Creek in Carlotta, California

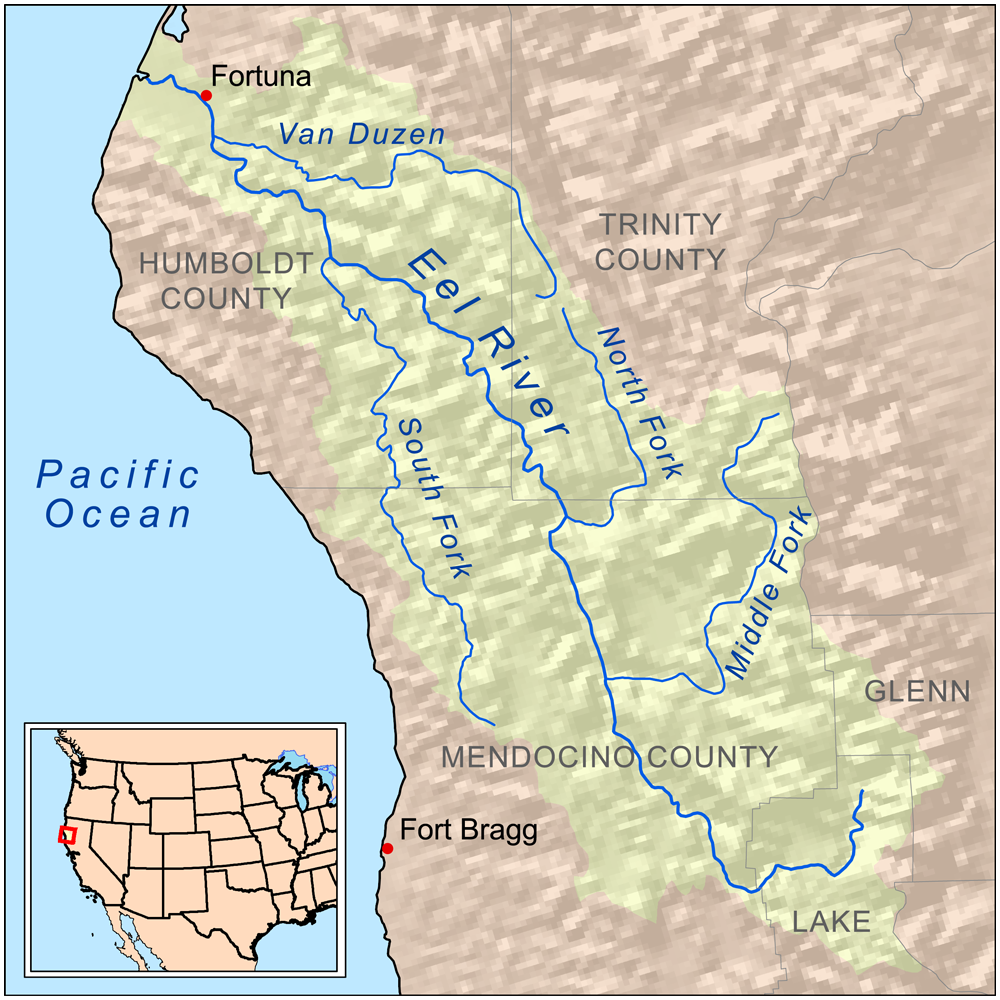
- Map of the Eel River basin including the Van Duzen River

- Location in California

Location
- Country: United States
- State: California
- Region: Humboldt County
- City: Carlotta

Physical characteristics
- Source: confluence
  - location: confluence of North Fork Yager Creek and Middle Fork Yager Creek., Humboldt County
  - coordinates: 40°34′35″N 123°55′46″W
  - elevation: 581 ft (177 m)
- Mouth: confluence
  - location: confluence with the Van Duzen River, Humboldt County
  - coordinates: 40°31′31″N 124°04′31″W
  - elevation: 92 ft (28 m)

Basin features
- River system: Van Duzen River
- Tributaries
  - left: South Fork Yager Creek, Wilson Creek
  - right: Lawrence Creek, Cooper Mill Creek

Yager Creek is a tributary stream of the Van Duzen River on the north coast of California in Humboldt County, California. It has its source at the confluence of North Fork Yager Creek and Middle Fork Yager Creek. Its mouth is at the confluence with the Van Duzen River just below the town of Carlotta.
