= Carl Christensen =

Carl Christensen may refer to:

- Carl Christensen (executioner) (1869–1936), last executioner in office for the government of Denmark
- Carl Christensen (botanist) (1872–1942), Danish systematic botanist
- Carl Christensen (soccer) (born 1956), retired American soccer defender
- Carl C. Christensen (1891–1956), American businessman and politician
- Carl L. Christensen Jr. (1907–1976), California politician
- C. C. A. Christensen (1831–1912), Danish-American artist
