= H. C. Nelson =

American politician

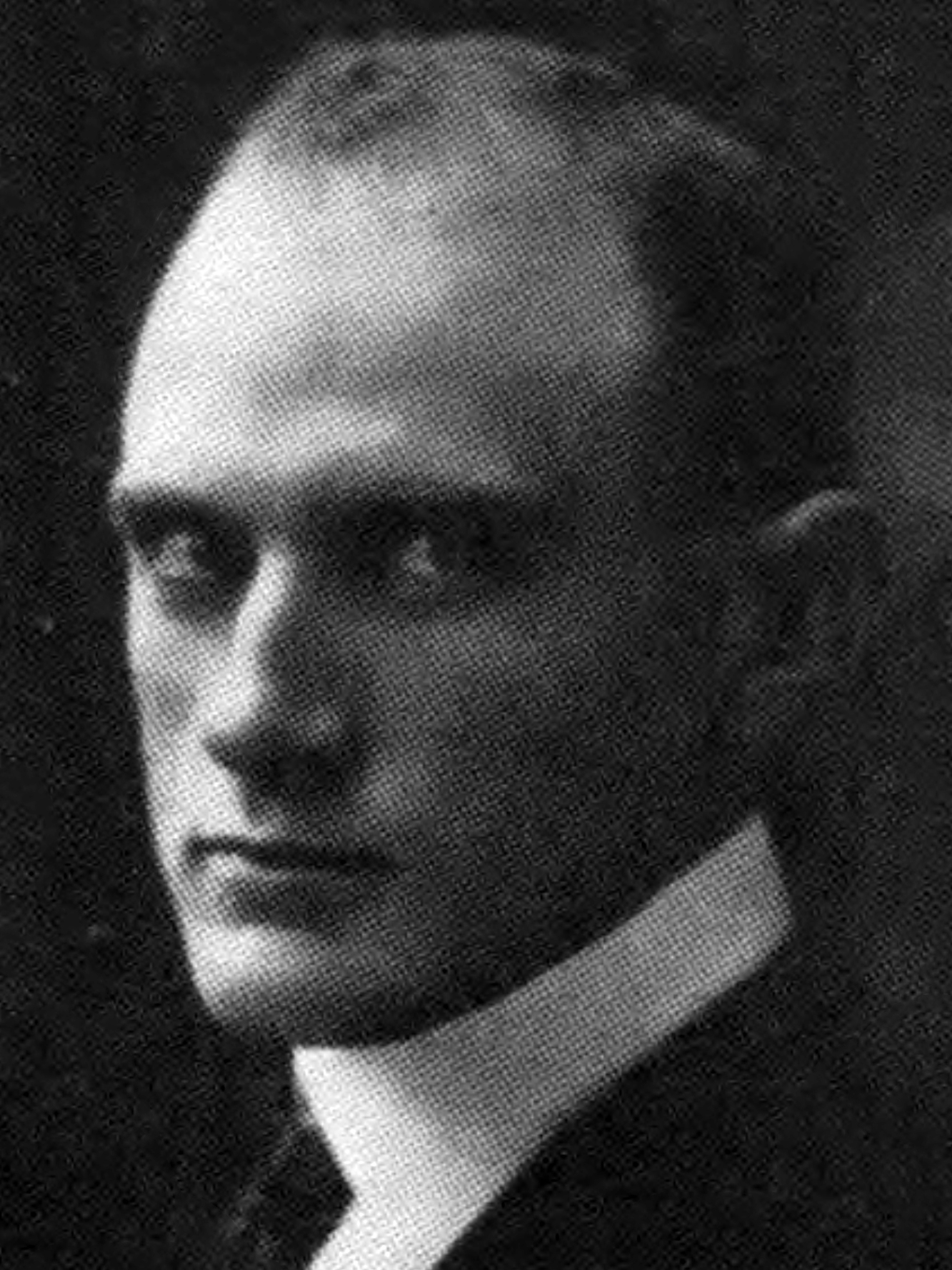

Member of the California Senate from the 1st district
- In office January 3, 1921 – January 2, 1933
- Preceded by: William Kehoe
- Succeeded by: Harold J. Powers

Member of the California State Assembly from the 2nd district
- In office January 6, 1913 – January 2, 1915
- Preceded by: William Kehoe
- Succeeded by: John Francis Quinn

Personal details
- Born: October 25, 1886 Denmark
- Died: May 29, 1939 (aged 52) San Francisco, California, U.S.
- Party: Republican
- Spouse: Esther Jones (m. 1913)
- Children: 2

Hans Christian Nelson (October 25, 1886 – May 29, 1939) was a Denmark-born American politician who served as a member of the California State Assembly for the 2nd district from 1913 to 1915, he also served in the California State Senate, representing the 1st District from 1921 to 1933.
