= Lassik =

Lassik may refer to:

- Lassik people, one of the Eel River Athapaskan peoples of California
- Lassik language, the language formerly spoken by them

== See also ==
- Lassic, 19th-century leader of the Eel River Athapaskan peoples
- Lasic (disambiguation)
- Lasik
