= Van Duzen River =

River in California, United States

Van Duzen River Van Duzen's Fork
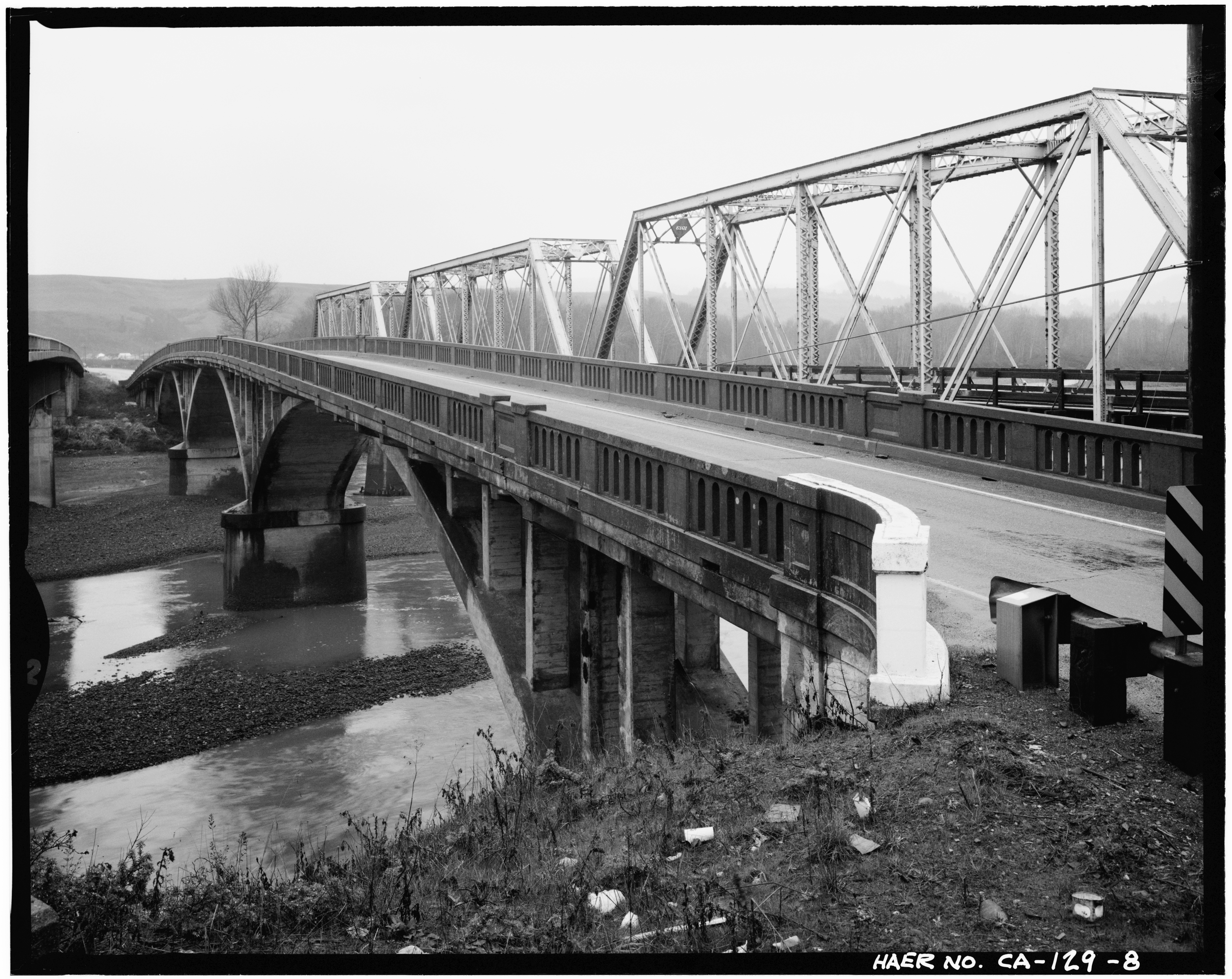
- Van Duzen River Bridge at Highway 101

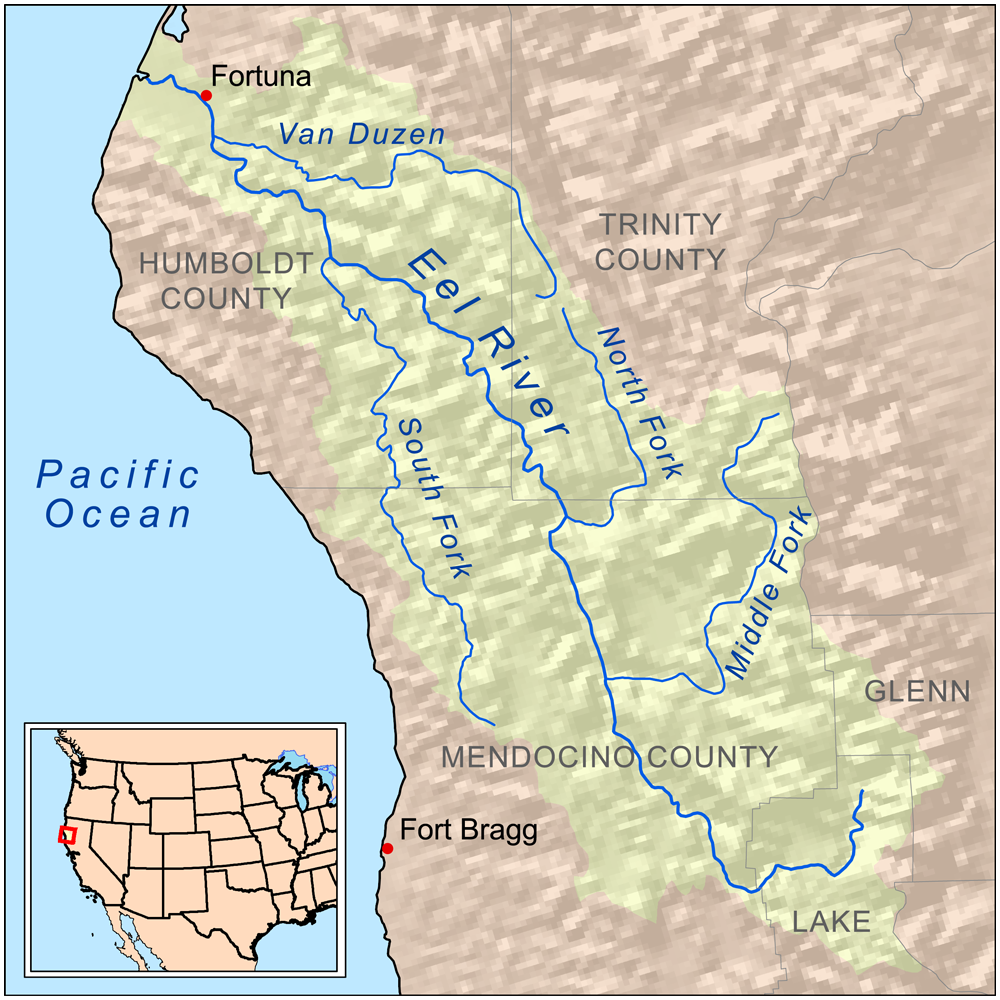
- Map of the Eel River basin including the Van Duzen River

Location
- Country: United States
- State: California
- Region: Trinity County, Humboldt County
- Cities: Dinsmore, Bridgeville, Carlotta, Hydesville, Rohnerville

Physical characteristics
- Source: Hettenshaw Peak south of Hettenshaw Valley
  - location: About 1.5 miles (2.4 km) south of Ruth Reservoir, Trinity County
  - coordinates: 40°15′16″N 123°23′56″W
  - elevation: 3,560 ft (1,090 m)
- Mouth: Eel River
  - location: Humboldt County
  - coordinates: 40°32′54″N 124°09′40″W
  - elevation: 33 ft (10 m)
- Length: 63 mi (101 km)
- Basin size: 429 sq mi (1,110 km^{2})
- Discharge
  - location: near Bridgeville
  - average: 846 cu ft/s (24.0 m^{3}/s)
  - minimum: 2.9 cu ft/s (0.082 m^{3}/s)
  - maximum: 48,700 cu ft/s (1,380 m^{3}/s)

Basin features
- River system: Eel River
- Tributaries
  - left: Little Van Duzen River, Little Larabee Creek, Hoagland Creek
  - right: Grizzly Creek, Yager Creek

National Wild and Scenic River
- Designated: January 19, 1981

The Van Duzen River is a river on the north coast of California. It is a major tributary of the Eel River and drains 429 square miles (1,110 km^{2}), mostly in Humboldt County, with a small portion in Trinity County. The river travels 63 miles (101 km) from its headwaters on the west side of the North Coast Range to its confluence with the Eel River, about 14 miles (23 km) upstream from the Pacific Ocean and 17 miles (27 km) south of Eureka, California. The river's elevation is over 5,000 feet (1,500 m) at its source and only 60 feet (18 m) when it merges with the Eel River. The river has two forks in its upper reaches. The North Fork travels northwest until it reaches the small town of Dinsmore, where it starts flowing west. The Little Van Duzen, which also flows northwest, joins the North Fork a few miles later. The river flows roughly west from then on. It meets its largest tributary, Yaeger Creek, about 5 miles (8.0 km) before it reaches the Eel River.

The river is used for recreation at locations including Grizzly Creek Redwoods State Park and for industrial, agricultural and municipal water supply by residents living along the western portion of California State Route 36. The river also provides wildlife habitat for preservation of rare and endangered species including cold freshwater habitat for fish migration and spawning. The primary land use in the watershed is timberland. Road construction and poor logging practices, particularly historical, have increased erosion, leading to excessive sediment buildup in the river and its tributaries. In addition, gravel mining, particularly at the confluence of the Van Duzen and Eel River, has increased erosion, affected channel alignment and may block fish migration.

About 26 percent of the land is owned by industrial timber companies. About 31 percent is privately owned, but not industrial, land used for timber production and ranches. Residential land makes up 26 percent and public land makes up 17 percent. Most of the public land is near the river's headwaters in Six Rivers National Forest.

The Van Duzen River has been federally designated as a "National Wild and Scenic River". It is named for James Van Duzen a member of the Josiah Gregg exploring party that first traveled to Humboldt Bay overland in 1849.

The deaths of 14 dogs after going swimming have occurred in the last twenty years due to cyanobacteria in blue-green algae on the Big Lagoon, South Fork Eel River or the Van Duzen River during times of warm weather and low water flow.
