= Fort Seward =

Fort Seward may refer to:

- Fort Seward, California
- Fort William H. Seward, in Alaska
