= Bridgeville, California =

Unincorporated community in California, United States

- Unincorporated community
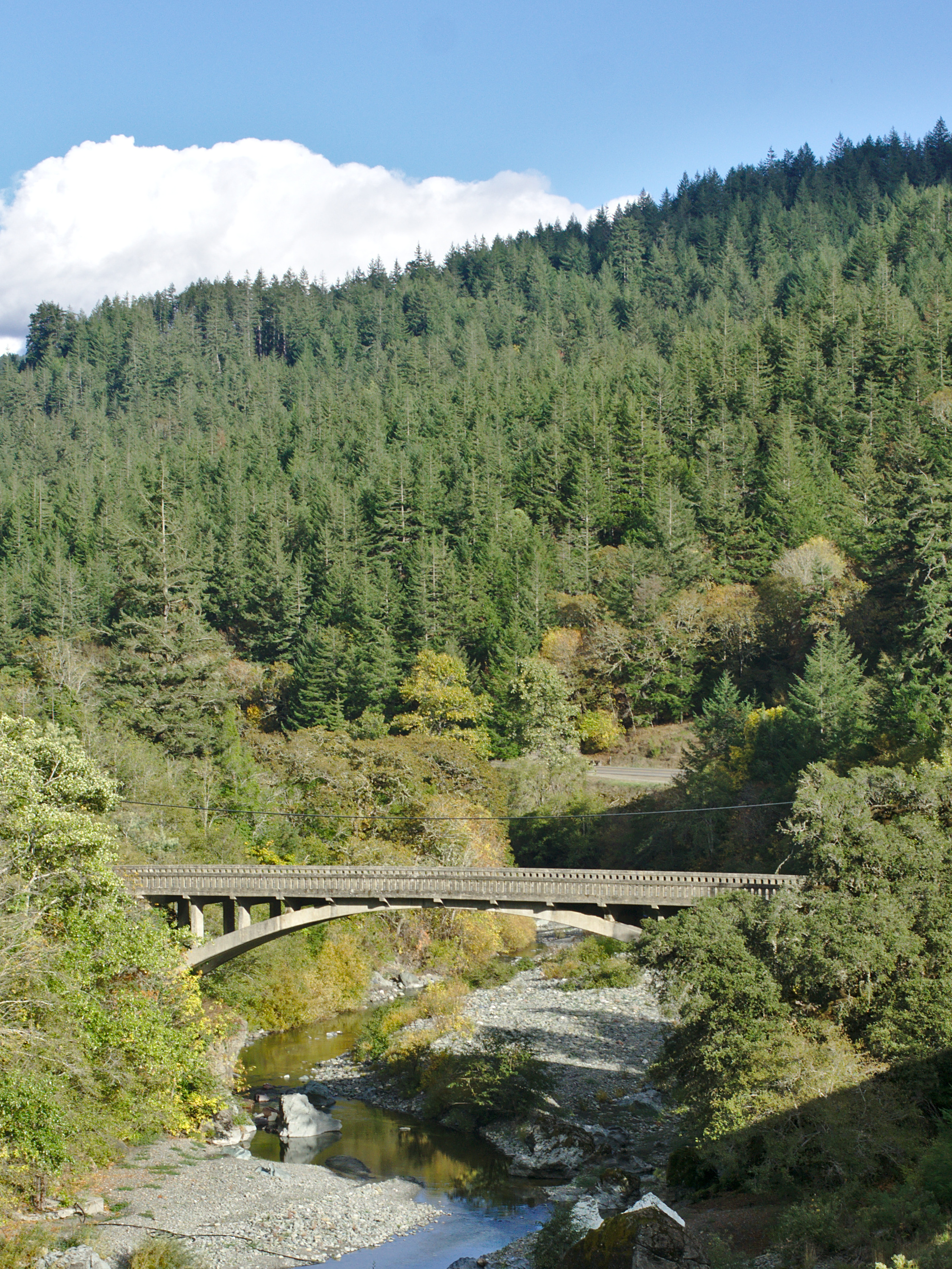
- Old Bridge over the Van Duzen River

- Location in California
- Coordinates: 40°28′10″N 123°47′59″W
- Country: United States
- State: California
- County: Humboldt
- Elevation: 636 ft (194 m)

Bridgeville (formerly Robinsons Ferry and Bridgeport) is an unincorporated community in Humboldt County, California, United States. It is located 12 miles (19 km) north-northeast of Weott, at an elevation of 636 feet (194 m). Bridgeville is 260 mi (420 km) north of San Francisco, with a population of about 25.

== History ==
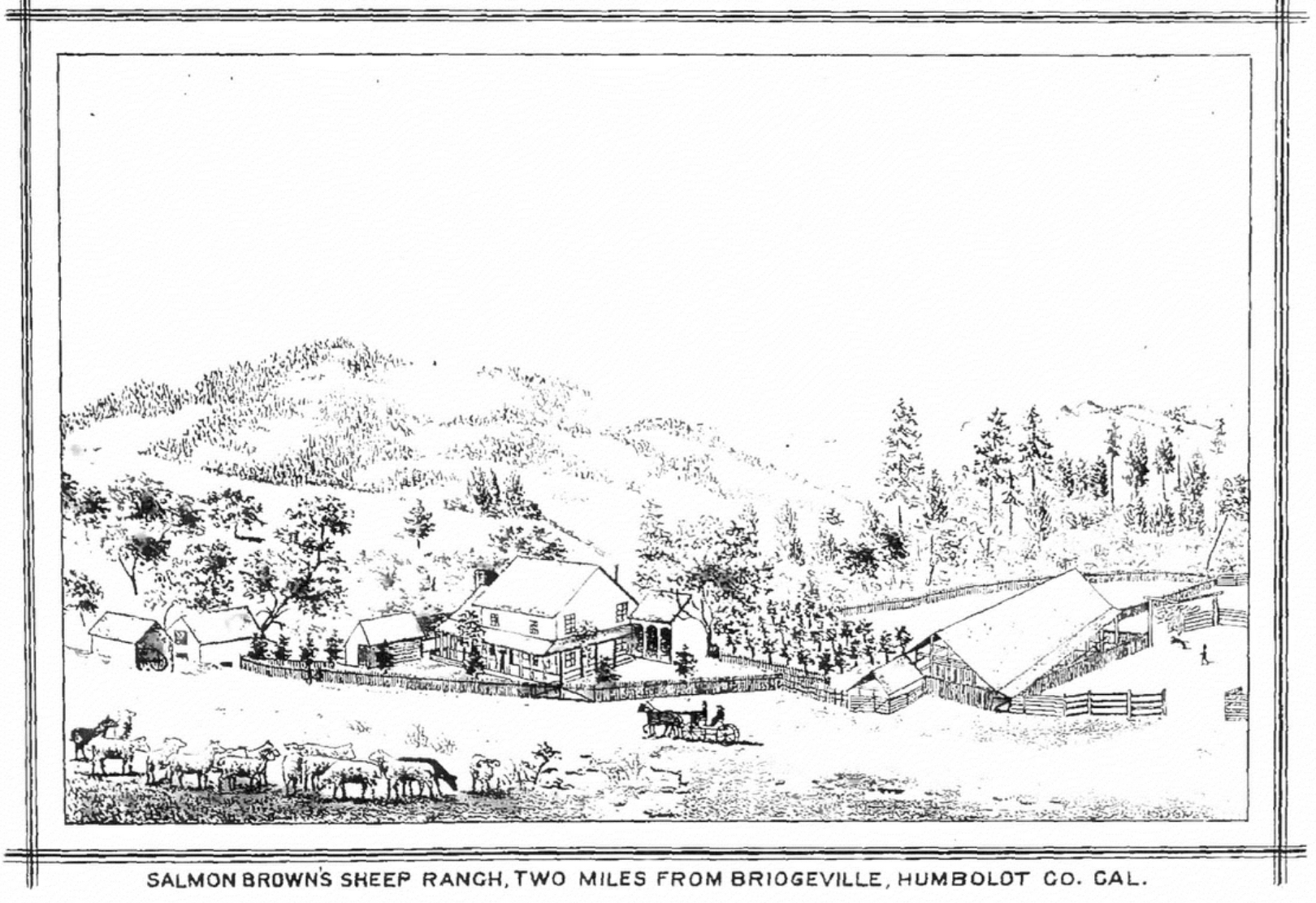
Salmon Brown's sheep ranch, two miles from Bridgeville

Originally called Robinsons Crossing, it was renamed Bridgeport when a bridge was built across the Van Duzen River in 1875. The post office rejected Bridgeport as a name because of another Bridgeport (in Mono County), and the Bridgeville post office opened in 1877. Robinsons Crossing was named in honor of William Slaughter Robinson, a local rancher.

One of the first settlers was Salmon Brown, a Merino sheep farmer, son of John Brown the abolitionist. To rescue his mother Mary from hostility to Brown in Red Bluff, in 1870 he sold his ranch near Corning, California, and bought one near Bridgeville. Mary and her daughters moved nearby, to Rohnerville. In 1893 he moved to Portland, Oregon.

The 83-acre (340,000 m^{2}) town became famous in 2002 for being the first in history to be put up for auction on eBay. It was originally sold for $1.77m but the buyer backed out of the deal only for it to be bought by businessman Bruce Krall for $700,000.

Krall put the town up for sale again in 2006 for a starting price of $1.75m. According to the BBC News website, the price included three cows, eight houses, and a post office.

Los Angeles-based entertainment manager and college student Daniel Thomas La Paille, 25, purchased the town on August 3, 2006 from Krall. La Paille paid $1.25 million, the money coming from his own entertainment management work as well as from his mother and grandmother.

In an interview with the Times-Standard, La Paille said, "[Community] is very important in every aspect. We all have to live together. Bridgeville is going to be an example. We're going to ... show that we can be environmentally conscious, good neighbors and just create a special little community."

According to the Los Angeles County Coroner's Office, Daniel La Paille committed suicide on November 9, 2006. The cause of death was a single gunshot wound to the chest.

On June 29, 2007, Bridgeville was on the market with a $1.3 million price tag for at least several months. This was the third time in five years that Bridgeville had been listed for sale.

In June 2013, Steve Farzam, the COO of the Shore Hotel in Santa Monica, California, entrepreneur, and serial fraudster, offered to purchase Bridgeville for $900,000 from Daniel La Paille's mother. Steve Farzam had his development team visit the town, where they met with the County Board of Supervisors. According to Humboldt County Supervisor Estelle Fennell, Farzam wanted to start his own police force in Bridgeville, for which he would need the approval of the county sheriff. According to one of Farzam's colleagues, Farzam said he would not buy the town if he was unable to start a police department. According to Fennell, the sheriff was adamant that there would be no changes to law enforcement in Bridgeville and the deal never materialized.

== Geography ==
The Van Duzen River flows through Bridgeville.

The ZIP Code is 95526. The community is inside area code 707.

=== Climate ===
This region experiences warm (but not hot) and dry summers, with no average monthly temperatures above 71.6 °F (22 °C). According to the Köppen Climate Classification system, Bridgeville has a warm-summer Mediterranean climate, abbreviated "Csb" on climate maps.

== Education ==
Bridgeville is the seat of the Bridgeville Elementary School District, and home of the Bridgeville School, a public K-8 school.

== Politics ==
In the state legislature, Bridgeville is in the 2nd senatorial district, represented by Democrat Mike McGuire, and the 2nd Assembly district, represented by Democrat Chris Rogers.

Federally, Bridgeville is in California's 2nd congressional district, represented by Democrat Jared Huffman.
