= William Kehoe =

American lawyer and politician

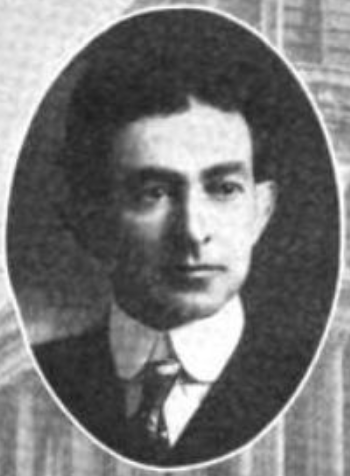

Member of the California Senate from the 1st district
- In office January 6, 1913 – January 3, 1921
- Preceded by: Charles Pryde Cutten
- Succeeded by: Hans Christian Nelson

Member of the California State Assembly from the 2nd district
- In office January 4, 1909 – January 6, 1913
- Preceded by: Charles Pryde Cutten
- Succeeded by: Hans Christian Nelson

Personal details
- Born: September 12, 1876 Greenwood, California
- Died: September 17, 1932 (aged 56) Berkeley, California
- Party: Republican
- Spouse: Mary Ellen Kehoe
- Education: University of Michigan
- Occupation: Lawyer, politician

William Kehoe (September 12, 1876 – September 17, 1932) was an American lawyer and politician.

== Biography ==
William Kehoe was born in Greenwood (now Elk), California on September 12, 1876. He earned a degree at the University of Michigan and worked as a lawyer. He served as a member of the California State Assembly, representing the 2nd District, from 1908 to 1912. He was then a member of the California State Senate from 1912 to 1920.

He died at his home in Berkeley on September 17, 1932.
