= Lawrence Creek =

Lawrence Creek may refer to:

- Lawrence Creek (California), a river in California
- Lawrence Creek (Kentucky), a river in Kentucky
- Lawrence Creek, Oklahoma, a town in Oklahoma
