= Jim Wood (California politician) =

American politician

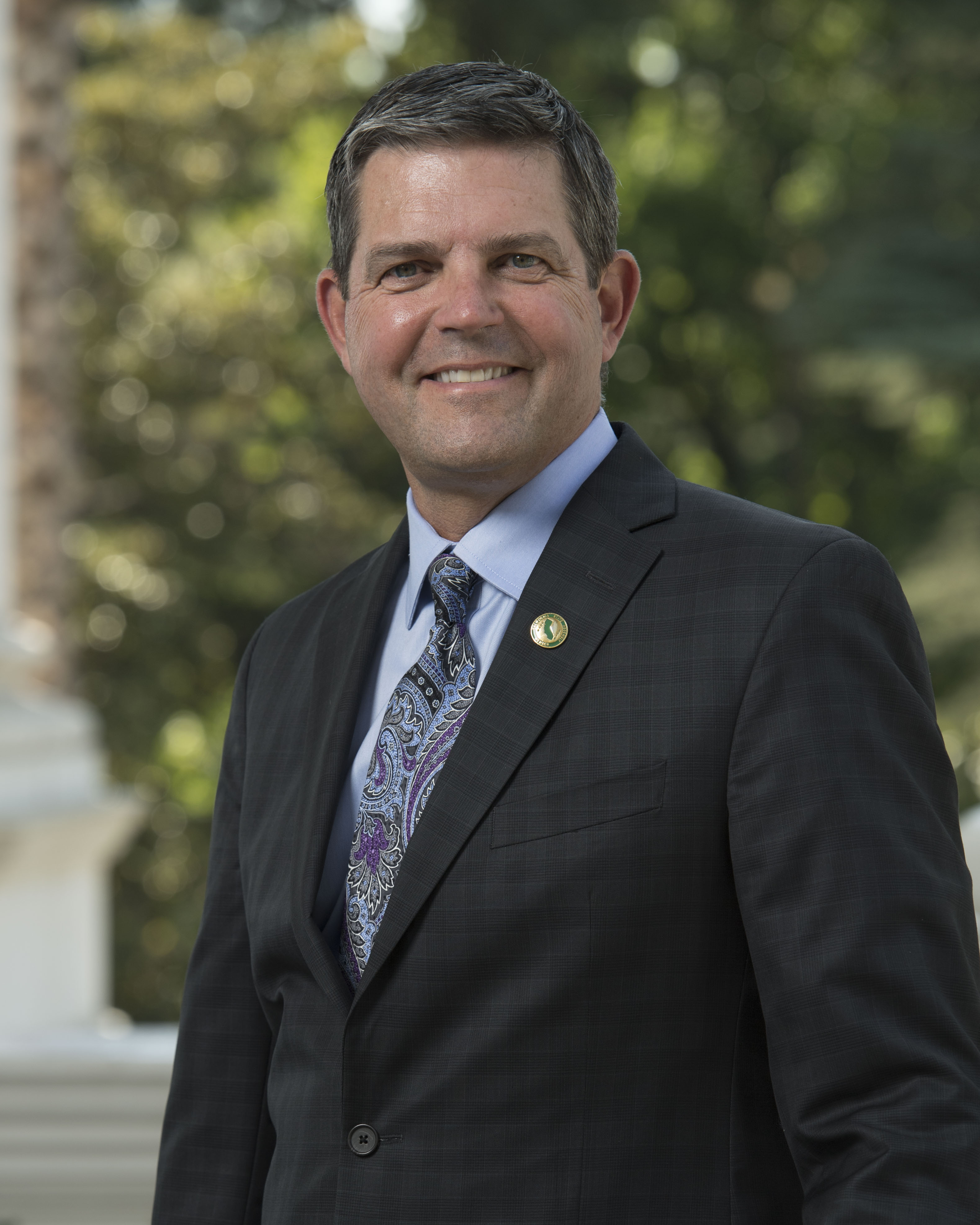

Speaker pro tempore of the California State Assembly
- In office November 22, 2023 – December 2, 2024
- Preceded by: Cecilia Aguiar-Curry
- Succeeded by: Josh Lowenthal

Member of the California State Assembly from the 2nd district
- In office December 1, 2014 – November 30, 2024
- Preceded by: Wesley Chesbro
- Succeeded by: Chris Rogers

Personal details
- Born: James David Wood Jr. April 10, 1960 (age 66) Turlock, California, U.S.
- Party: Democratic
- Education: University of California, Riverside (BS); Loma Linda University (DDS)

James David "Jim" Wood Jr. (born April 10, 1960) is an American politician who served as Speaker pro Tempore of the California State Assembly from 2023 to 2024. He is a Democrat who represented the 2nd Assembly District, which encompasses all of Del Norte, Humboldt, Mendocino, and Trinity counties, plus northern and coastal Sonoma County, including the northern half of Santa Rosa.

Prior to being elected to the Assembly in 2014, he was the Mayor of Healdsburg and a family dentist. He also served on the Healdsburg City Council for 8 years from 2006 to 2014.

In addition to his work as a member of the Assembly, he has worked as a forensic dentist for five Northern California counties, establishing a mass disaster identification team in California and helped pass state legislation to standardize county identification procedures, a model now adopted by other states. He has been called to support efforts to identify victims of disasters including 9/11, Hurricane Katrina, the Valley Fire in Lake County and other wildfires in northern California, including the Camp Fire.

Wood was appointed chair of the Assembly Health Committee in the first quarter of 2016 and focuses on issues related to increasing access to quality, affordable health care. He notes his most significant accomplishment to date has been the creation of the Office of Health Care Affordability, signed by Governor Gavin Newsom on June 30, 2022, and is contained in the budget bill, SB 184 (see Section 19).

Wood represents an area of Northern California that has experienced some of the largest wildfires in the state, including the August Complex, Mendocino Complex, LNU Lightning and Monument. He has successfully sought billions in state funding for fire prevention, vegetation management and home hardening and created a separate entity within the State Fire Marshal to focus on planning and prevention activities.

Wood also authored a bill, AB 890, signed by Governor Gavin Newsom, that allows nationally certified nurse practitioners, after completing specific transition requirements, to practice to the full scope of their license independent of physician oversight. He has said increasing the number of primary care health care practitioners is needed to increase access to care for people in California, especially in underserved and rural areas.

In November 2023, Wood announced he would not be running for reelection after more than a decade in the California Assembly, citing a desire to spend more time with family.

== Elections ==
=== Healdsburg City Council ===
==== 2006 ====
2006 Healdsburg City Council Election
Party	Candidate	Votes	%
Nonpartisan	Jim Wood	3,026	50.6
Nonpartisan	Eric A Ziedrich	2,774	46.4
Other	Write-in	180	3.0
Total votes		5,980	100.0

==== 2010 ====
2010 Healdsburg City Council Election
Party	Candidate	Votes	%
Nonpartisan	Jim Wood	3,250	48.0
Nonpartisan	Susan E. Jones	2,623	38.7
Nonpartisan	Rosie Fabian	888	13.1
Total votes		6,761	100.0

=== California State Assembly ===
==== 2014 ====
California's 2nd State Assembly district election, 2014
Primary election
Party	Candidate	Votes	%
Democratic	Jim Wood	37,244	41.2
Republican	Matt Heath	28,866	31.9
Democratic	John Lowry	16,464	18.2
Green	Pamela Elizondo	7,853	8.7
Total votes		90,427	100.0
General election
Democratic	Jim Wood	85,045	65.1
Republican	Matt Heath	45,553	34.9
Total votes		130,598	100.0
Democratic hold			

==== 2016 ====
California's 2nd State Assembly district election, 2016
Primary election
Party	Candidate	Votes	%
Democratic	Jim Wood (incumbent)	102,308	99.9
Libertarian	Ken Anton (write-in)	56	0.1
Total votes		102,364	100.0
General election
Democratic	Jim Wood (incumbent)	138,020	72.9
Libertarian	Ken Anton	51,245	27.1
Total votes		189,265	100.0
Democratic hold			

==== 2018 ====
California's 2nd State Assembly district election, 2018
Primary election
Party	Candidate	Votes	%
Democratic	Jim Wood (incumbent)	80,178	69.6
Republican	Matt Heath	34,975	30.4
Total votes		115,153	100.0
General election
Democratic	Jim Wood (incumbent)	128,444	69.4
Republican	Matt Heath	56,549	30.6
Total votes		184,993	100.0
Democratic hold			

==== 2020 ====
California's 2nd State Assembly district election, 2020
Primary election
Party	Candidate	Votes	%
Democratic	Jim Wood (incumbent)	112,839	70.8%
Republican	Charlotte Svolos	46,439	29.2%
Total votes		159,279	100.0%
General election
Democratic	Jim Wood (incumbent)	162,287	68.5%
Republican	Charlotte Svolos	74,582	31.5%
Total votes		236,869	100%

==== 2022 ====
California's 2nd State Assembly district election, 2022
Primary election
Party	Candidate	Votes	%
Democratic	Jim Wood (incumbent)	92,411	71.06%
Republican	Charlotte Svolos	37,636	28.94%
Total votes		130,047	100.0%
General election
Democratic	Jim Wood (incumbent)	129,356	68.92%
Republican	Charlotte Svolos	58,330	31.08%
Total votes		187,686	100%

California Assembly
Preceded by Cecilia Aguiar-Curry	Speaker pro tempore of the California Assembly; 2023–2024	Succeeded by Josh Lowenthal
