= Frank J. Cummings =

American politician

Frank J. Cummings (1871 – July 13, 1922) was an American politician. He served in the California State Assembly and represented the 2nd district.
