= John W. Runner =

American politician

John W. Runner (April 25, 1878 – September 13, 1955) was an American politician. He served in the California State Assembly and represented the 2nd district. He previously served as sheriff in Humboldt County, California.
