= Fred J. Moore =

American politician

Frederick John Moore Sr. (October 25, 1886 – May 9, 1959) was an American politician. He served in the California State Assembly and represented the 2nd district.
