= Anthony Jennings Bledsoe =

American politician

Anthony Jennings Bledsoe (1808 – April 7, 1900) was an American politician. He served in the California State Assembly and represented the 2nd district. He was previously served as sheriff and tax collector in Santa Cruz County, California.
