= Liberal, Missouri =

- City
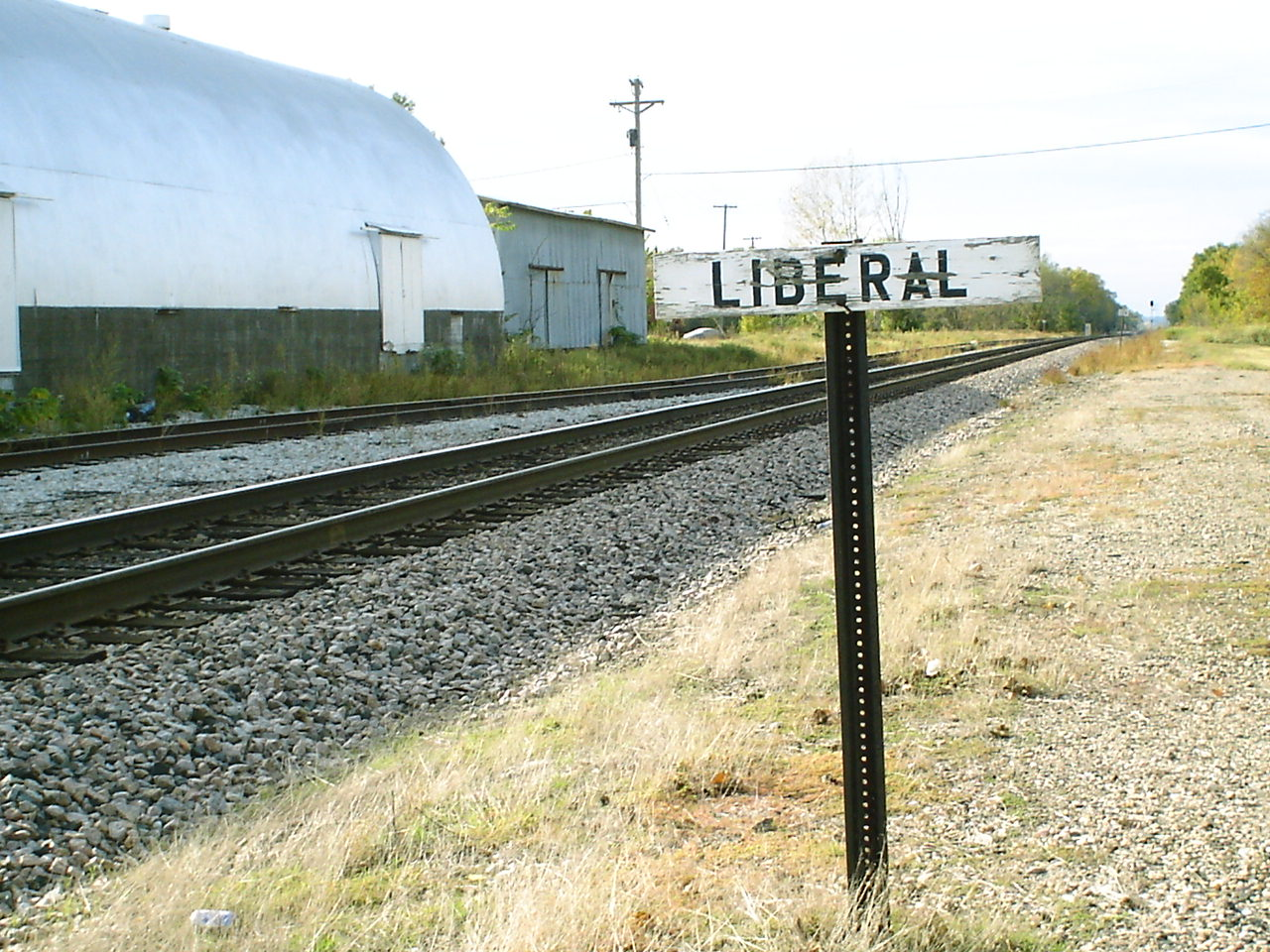
- Railroad sign for Liberal

- Location of Liberal, Missouri
- Coordinates: 37°33′33″N 94°30′59″W
- Country: United States
- State: Missouri
- County: Barton
- Incorporated: 1882

Government
  - Mayor: George Wasler

Area
  - Total: 0.85 sq mi (2.20 km^{2})
  - Land: 0.84 sq mi (2.18 km^{2})
  - Water: 0.0077 sq mi (0.02 km^{2})
- Elevation: 886 ft (270 m)

Population (2020)
  - Total: 629
  - Density: 746/sq mi (287.9/km^{2})
- Time zone: UTC-6 (Central (CST))
  - Summer (DST): UTC-5 (CDT)
- ZIP code: 64762
- Area code: 417
- FIPS code: 29-41906
- GNIS feature ID: 2395699
- Website: liberalmo.gov

Liberal is a city in Barton County, Missouri, United States. The population was 629 at the 2020 census.

Liberal was founded as an atheist utopia in 1880 by George Wasler, who named it after the Liberal League in nearby Lamar. The city had restrictions on both religious buildings and saloons, instead offering intellectual pursuits. A contingent of Christian residents moved to the town and began holding religious services against Walser's wishes, and eventually took hold of the settlement.

== History ==
Liberal was founded in 1880 by George Walser, an anti-religionist, agnostic lawyer and former state legislator who wished to create an atheist, "freethinker" utopia. It was named after the Liberal League in Lamar, Missouri, which Walser was a member of at the time. Walser purchased 2,000 acres (8 km^{2}) of land and advertised across the country for atheists to join his town, which would "have neither God, Hell, Church, nor Saloon".

Walser organized a reformed school system that sought to promote liberal education free from the bias of Christian theology, and had instructional classes on Sundays to replace religious services. The Free Thought University was founded in 1886 with a staff of seven teachers providing regular lectures and hosting intellectual debates. The arrival of the railroad triggered a population boom, bringing the town to 546 residents by 1890.

Christian practitioners began arriving in Liberal soon after it was founded, but were initially met with resistance by Walser. They quietly bought homes within the town and began holding religious services, which were interrupted by Walser, and the Christian group later moved to nearby plots of land after being evicted. A new town, named Pedro, was established in 1884 by the Christians after Walser erected a barbed wire fence around Liberal. Walser eventually relaxed restrictions on saloons in 1887 and churches in 1889.

The local population peaked in the 1910s and declined for much of the 20th century. A major drought in 1980 triggered an exodus of businesses and residents. Today, Liberal is part of a solidly conservative electorate that encompasses all of Barton County.

== Geography ==
According to the United States Census Bureau, the city has a total area of 0.84 square miles (2.18 km^{2}), of which 0.83 square miles (2.15 km^{2}) is land and 0.01 square miles (0.03 km^{2}) is water.

== Demographics ==
Historical population
Census	Pop.	Note	%±
1890	546		—
1900	532		−2.6%
1910	800		50.4%
1920	1,160		45.0%
1930	848		−26.9%
1940	771		−9.1%
1950	739		−4.2%
1960	612		−17.2%
1970	644		5.2%
1980	701		8.9%
1990	684		−2.4%
2000	779		13.9%
2010	759		−2.6%
2020	629		−17.1%
U.S. Decennial Census

=== 2010 census ===
As of the census of 2010, there were 759 people, 319 households, and 203 families residing in the city. The population density was 914.5 inhabitants per square mile (353.1/km^{2}). There were 364 housing units at an average density of 438.6 per square mile (169.3/km^{2}). The racial makeup of the city was 93.9% White, 0.5% African American, 1.7% Native American, 0.1% Asian, 0.1% from other races, and 3.6% from two or more races. Hispanic or Latino of any race were 1.8% of the population.

There were 319 households, of which 36.1% had children under the age of 18 living with them, 46.4% were married couples living together, 12.2% had a female householder with no husband present, 5.0% had a male householder with no wife present, and 36.4% were non-families. 34.8% of all households were made up of individuals, and 15.4% had someone living alone who was 65 years of age or older. The average household size was 2.38 and the average family size was 3.07.

The median age in the city was 34.1 years. 30.3% of residents were under the age of 18; 6.8% were between the ages of 18 and 24; 26.9% were from 25 to 44; 21.6% were from 45 to 64; and 14.4% were 65 years of age or older. The gender makeup of the city was 47.8% male and 52.2% female.

=== 2000 census ===
As of the census of 2000, there were 779 people, 328 households, and 212 families residing in the city. The population density was 930.7 inhabitants per square mile (359.3/km^{2}). There were 361 housing units at an average density of 431.3 per square mile (166.5/km^{2}). The racial makeup of the city was 96.02% White, 0.26% African American, 1.54% Native American, 0.13% Asian, and 2.05% from two or more races. 1.16% of the population were Hispanic or Latino of any race.

There were 328 households, of which 36.6% housed children under the age of 18, 47.3% were married couples living together, 14.0% had a female householder with no husband present, and 35.1% were non-families. 33.5% of all households were made up of individuals, and 19.5% had someone living alone who was 65 years of age or older. The average household size was 2.38 and the average family size was 2.98.

In the city the population was spread out, with 30.4% under the age of 18, 8.9% from 18 to 24, 25.9% from 25 to 44, 18.2% from 45 to 64, and 16.6% who were 65 years of age or older. The median age was 32 years. For every 100 females, there were 82.9 males. For every 100 females age 18 and over, there were 81.9 males.

The median income for a household in the city was $24,375, and the median income for a family was $30,625. Males had a median income of $22,656 versus $21,406 for females. The per capita income for the city was $11,246. 19.6% of the population and 14.7% of families were below the poverty line. 30.7% of those under the age of 18 and 14.0% of those 65 and older were living below the poverty line.

== Education ==
Public education in Liberal is administered by Liberal R-II School District, which operates one elementary school, one middle school, and Liberal High School.

Liberal has a public library, a branch of the Barton County Library.

== Notable people ==
- Lester Thomas Davis, California state legislator
- Bob Harmon, Major League Baseball player with St. Louis Cardinals and Pittsburgh Pirates in early 20th century
- Matt Miller, former ESPN analyst and suspected fraudster
