= Robert F. Fisher =

American politician

Member of the California State Assembly
- In office January 3, 1927 – January 2, 1933
- Preceded by: John W. Runner
- Succeeded by: Michael J. Burns
- Constituency: 2nd district (1927–1931); 1st district (1931–1933)

Personal details
- Born: February 18, 1879 Plymouth, England
- Died: July 20, 1969 (aged 90) Carlotta, California, US
- Party: Republican

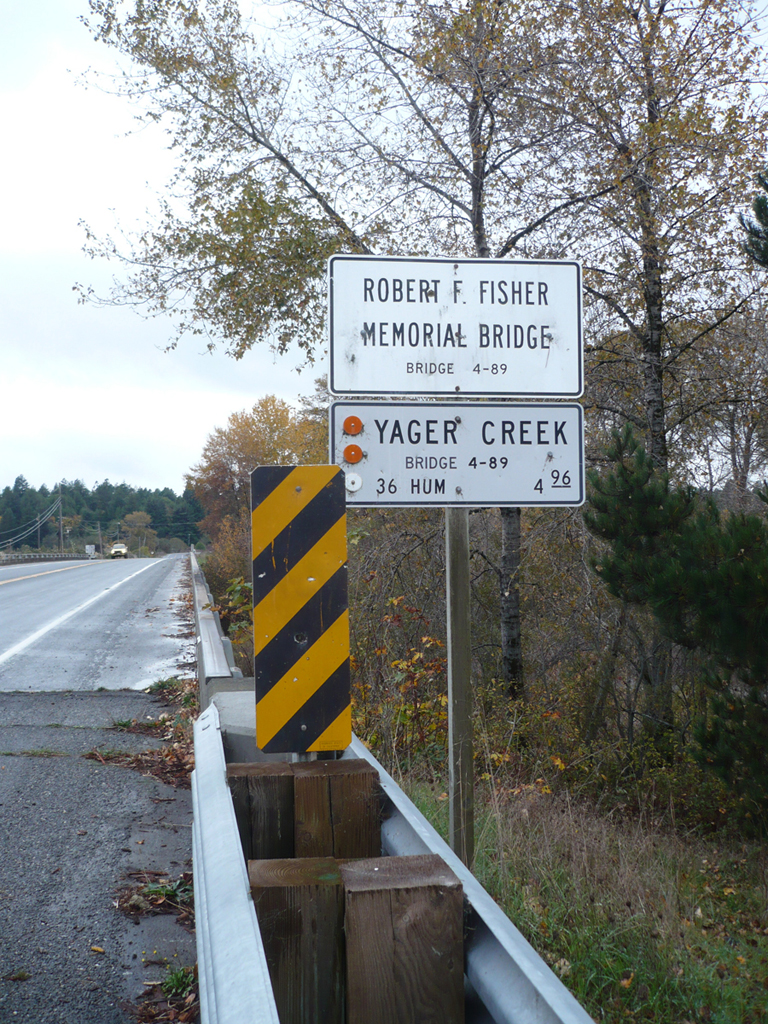
The Robert F. Fisher Memorial Bridge over Yager Creek in Carlotta, California.

Robert F. Fisher, (February 18, 1879 – July 20, 1969) was an American politician who served in the California legislature and during the Spanish–American War he served in the United States Army.

== Life and career ==
Fisher was born in Plymouth, Devon on February 18, 1879, and emigrated to America in 1885 with his parents, Charles Ponsford Fisher and Harriet Oyns Fisher. The family settled in the mountains outside of San Diego, California. In 1898 Fisher enlisted in the Army during the Spanish–American War and served 13 months in the Philippines with the Third Artillery. After the war, he returned to the Philippines and ran a lighterage company for 12 years. He met his future wife, Bess Hayne Dawson (1883–1974) in Manila; they came back to the United States to be married in August 1912. The young couple took over management of his family's newly purchased ranch near Carlotta in Humboldt County, California. Fisher was the first president of the Humboldt County Farm Bureau and an early member of the Fortuna Rotary Club. Mrs. Fisher was also active in the community and in the Humboldt County and California State Federation of Women's Clubs.

Fisher ran for state Assembly in Humboldt County the first time in 1926, won the seat and retained it for the next two elections in 1928 and 1930, serving until 1932. He was a member of the Republican party.

In 1962, the couple celebrated fifty years of marriage and lived in Carlotta for the rest of their lives.

In 1969, the California Assembly named Bridge 04-089 which had been built the previous year over Yager Creek in Carlotta, after Fisher. When he died, he was the last Spanish–American War veteran in Humboldt County.
