= Stan Statham =

American politician (1939–2020)

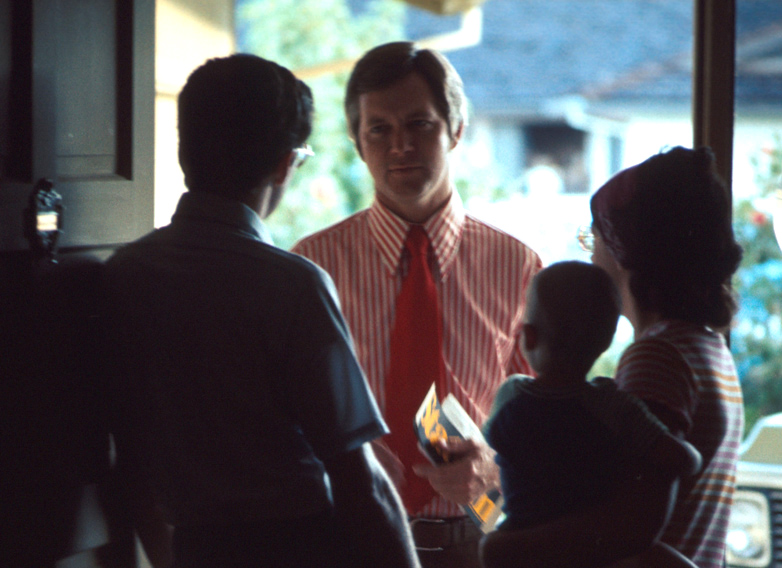
- Statham campaigning door-to-door in 1976

Member of the California State Assembly
- In office December 6, 1976 – November 30, 1994
- Preceded by: Pauline Davis
- Succeeded by: Tom Woods
- Constituency: 1st district (1976–1992); 2nd district (1992–1994)

Personal details
- Born: April 7, 1939 Chico, California, USA
- Died: August 1, 2020 (aged 81) Oak Run, California, USA
- Party: California Republican Party
- Occupation: Politician and broadcaster
- Known for: Advocate for the State of Jefferson

Stan Statham (April 7, 1939 – August 1, 2020) was an American broadcaster and politician from California. He was elected as a Republican to the California State Assembly in 1976, and served until 1994.

Statham was known as an advocate of the State of Jefferson.

== Biography ==
Stan Statham was born on April 7, 1939, in the then-rural community of Chico, California. After a single enlistment in the Army in Military Intelligence, he worked in radio and banking until landing the job of news director and nightly news anchor at KHSL-TV, the Chico CBS affiliate. For 12 years, Statham ran news operations; he also conducted several on-air interviews of politicians and celebrities.

Statham then took a nearly 20-year diversion from the news and broadcasting business to serve in the California State Assembly from 1976 to 1994. During that time, he was known as a crusader for the rights of the north state and rural communities. Because of his efforts to curb drunk driving and reduce traffic fatalities, Statham was appointed a lifetime member of the Presidential Commission on Drunk Driving, an honor bestowed upon only 26 citizens.

Statham ran for lieutenant governor in 1994, losing in the GOP primary to state Senator Cathie Wright. Statham then returned to broadcasting assuming the position of president and CEO of the California Broadcasters Association. As president of the CBA, he has moderated California gubernatorial debates for many years, including the much-publicized 2003 debate preceding Arnold Schwarzenegger’s initial election as governor. In 2002, he worked with Senator Dianne Fienstein to implement the California Amber Alert, which has been instrumental in assisting in the return of abducted children. In 2015 he retired from the California Broadcasters Association

He died on August 1, 2020, at the age of 81. He posthumously had a portion of State Highway - Route 44 in the County of Shasta designated by the California State Assembly as the Raymond “Stan” Stanley Statham Memorial Highway.

California Assembly
| Preceded by Dan Hauser | California State Assemblyman, 2nd District; 1992 – 1994 | Succeeded by Tom Woods |
| Preceded by Pauline Davis | California State Assemblyman, 1st District; 1976 – 1992 | Succeeded by Dan Hauser |
