= Hettenshaw Valley =

Valley in California, United States

Hettenshaw Valley, is a valley in the North Coast Ranges of Trinity County, California. Its mouth lies at an elevation of 3071 feet, (936m).

The head of the valley is at its south end, bounded by a ridge of Hettenshaw Peak, where the Van Duzen River has its source, 40°15′15″N 123°23′46″W. Its mouth lies on the northwest end of the valley where the Van Duzen River flows out to the west into Refuge Valley between Hetten Rock to the north and Hetten Ridge to the south. The north and east of the valley is bounded by Mad River Ridge, the southeast by Hettenshaw Peak.

== History ==
Also known as the Kettenshaw Valley in the early days of settlement. The valley was the scene of fighting during the Bald Hills War, part of the territory of the Wailaki people who were led by Lassic. It has also been called Hettenchaw Valley and Hettenchow Valley.
