= G. D. Marvin =

American politician

Geo D. Marvin was an American politician. He served in the California State Assembly from 1899 to 1901, representing the 2nd district.
