= George Walser =

American lawyer and politician

George Henry Walser (May 26, 1834 – May 1, 1910) was an American lawyer and politician.

Walser was born in Dearborn County, Indiana on May 26, 1834. In 1856, he was admitted to the Illinois bar. He served in the 12th Illinois Infantry Regiment during the American Civil War and was commissioned a lieutenant colonel. He then moved to Barton County, Missouri and continued to practice law in Lamar, Missouri. Walser was an agnostic and a supporter of the writer Robert G. Ingersoll. Walser founded the community of Liberal, Missouri in Barton County. He served in the Missouri House of Representatives in 1869 for two terms as a Republican. He died in Liberal, Missouri on May 1, 1910. Walser also wrote poetry.
