= Tom Woods (California politician) =

American politician

Member of the California State Assembly from the 2nd district
- In office December 5, 1994 – November 30, 1998
- Preceded by: Stan Statham
- Succeeded by: Richard Dickerson

Personal details
- Born: February 1, 1947 (age 79) Durham, North Carolina, U.S.
- Party: Republican
- Spouse: Alice Vermeer Woods
- Children: 5

Tom Woods (February 1, 1947) served as a member of the California State Assembly from 1994 until 1998. He chose not to run for a third term in 1998. He was succeeded by Richard "Dick" Dickerson.
