= George Williams (California politician) =

American politician

George Williams (March 29, 1822 – October 13, 1908) was an American politician. He served in the California State Assembly and represented the 2nd district.
