= Carlotta, California =

Unincorporated community in California, United States

Carlotta
- Unincorporated community
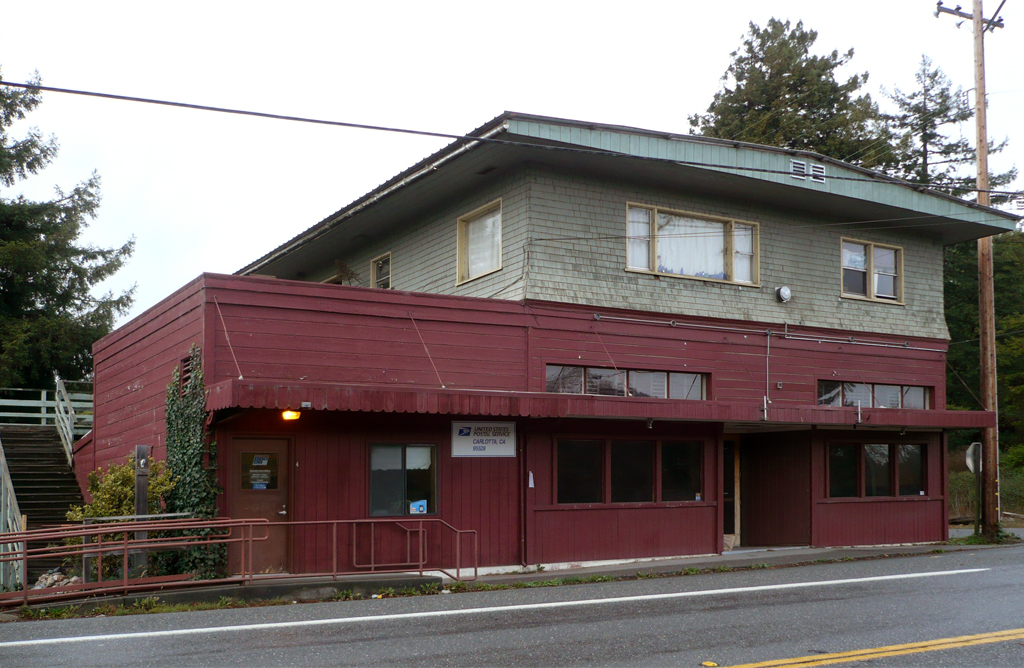
- The Carlotta Post Office

- Location in California
- Coordinates: 40°32′14″N 124°03′38″W
- Country: United States
- State: California
- County: Humboldt
- Elevation: 130 ft (40 m)
- GNIS feature ID: 220601

Carlotta is an unincorporated community in Humboldt County, California, United States. It is located 6.5 miles (10.5 km) southeast of Fortuna, at an elevation of 131 feet (40 m), approximately 5 miles (8.0 km) east of US Route 101 on California State Route 36.

== History ==
Carlotta is named after Carlotta Vance, daughter of John M. Vance, who laid out the town as a summer resort. The first post office at Carlotta opened in 1903.

At that time, it had several cottages, a hotel, store, blacksmith and saloon. Around 1915, a large farm at Carlotta was converted into a branch of Cottage Garden Nurseries, a company headquartered in New York; an orchard and thousands of ornamental plants were installed. Prohibition did in the saloon for a decade, and the depression of the 1930s reduced resort business, but the logging boom following World War II resulted in the construction of two large mills and housing for workers surrounding the town.

The hotel was essentially unchanged in 1975 which the National Register application form was filed. It was 36 by 80 feet (11 by 24 m) with a kitchen annex which burned down in 1974. The hotel was three stories high with dormers on a hip roof, wood shingle on the upper two stories but board and batten below. A veranda with gingerbread features ran the full length of the face and around the south side. Both ends had brick chimneys on the outside. The building was one of several resorts on the Overland Stage Route, today's Route 36. The hotel was known for popular Sunday dinners, Fourth of July celebrations, races and games; the clientele arrived and departed by train from Eureka.

The Vance family sold the town of Carlotta to local investors, including two of the local shopkeepers, in December 1921. The hotel remained under the same ownership from 1921 to 1977 when the heirs sold it, although it was also closed for several years in the 1920s to 1930s until being run by Joe Matteucci starting around 1936. The Matteucci family operated the hotel and restaurant for about 30 years. The Carlotta Hotel was nominated to the National Register of Historic Places for significant architecture, little change since construction and a representative of roadside hotels.

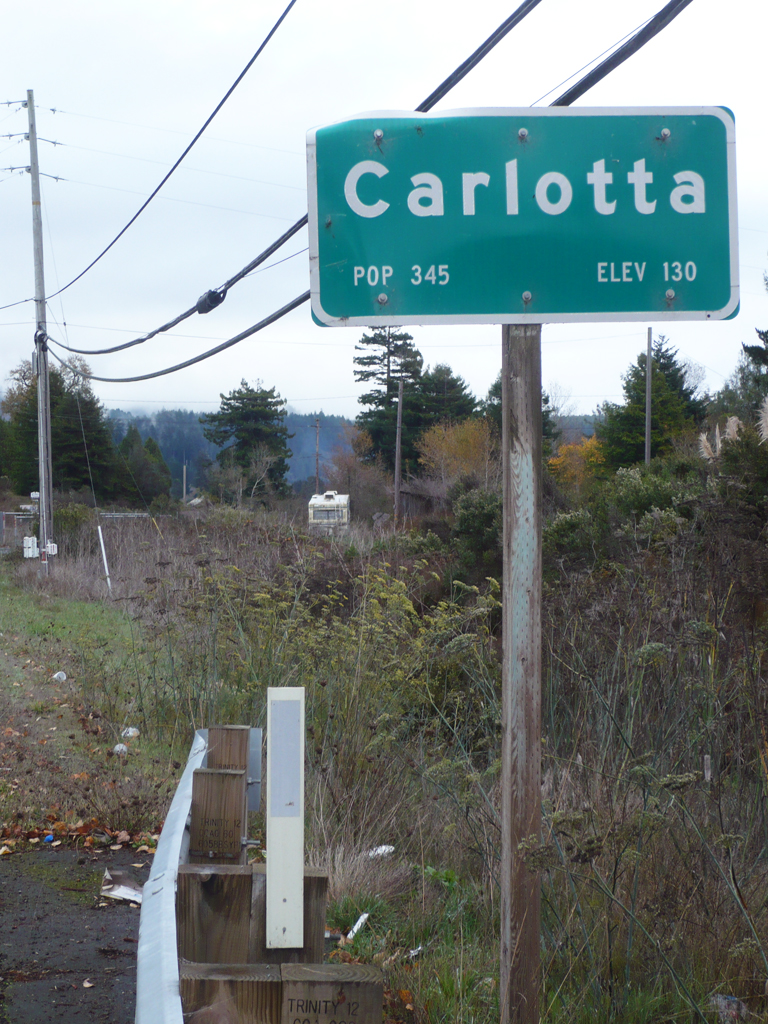
The town sign says population 345.

The town and hotel were sold to Angelo Batini in 1977 who reopened the Carlotta Hotel in 1984. The hotel and restaurant operated until an electrical fire in the mid-1990s destroyed the building.

In 2006, the two abandoned mills were still standing, but most of Carlotta's residents commute to Fortuna or Eureka for work.

== Geography ==
The town is adjacent to Yager Creek which joins the Van Duzen slightly downstream from Carlotta. The ZIP Code is 95528. The community is inside area code 707. The nearest airport is the Rohnerville Airport in Fortuna.

== Education ==
Carlotta is the seat of the Cuddeback Union School District, and home of the Cuddeback School, a public K-8 school located just off Route 36.

== Government ==
In the state legislature, Carlotta is in the 2nd senatorial district, represented by Democrat Mike McGuire, and the 2nd Assembly district, represented by Democrat Chris Rogers.

Federally, Carlotta is in California's 2nd congressional district, represented by Democrat Jared Huffman.

== Notable residents ==
Robert F. Fisher lived in Carlotta from 1912 until his death in 1969. He served as California State Assemblyman for Humboldt County from 1926 to 1932 and was the last surviving serviceman of the Spanish–American War in Humboldt County.

Resident and convicted sex offender Melvin Just was the subject of a 2000 documentary film, Just, Melvin: Just Evil by James Ronald Whitney, his step grandson. Whitney's sisters, cousins, aunts, extended step family and ambiguously complicit grandmother detail decades of Just's sexual abuse. The film also references Just's long suspected murder of a county social worker sent to check on the family.
