= Paul Denny (politician) =

Politician (born 1892)

Member of the California State Assembly from the 2nd district
- In office January 4, 1943 – January 6, 1947
- Preceded by: William I. Gunlock
- Succeeded by: Lester Thomas Davis

Personal details
- Born: October 6, 1892 Scotts Valley, California U.S.
- Died: June 10, 1959 (aged 66)
- Party: Republican

Paul Denny (October 6, 1892 – June 10, 1959) was born in Scott Valley, (Etna) California. He served in the California State Assembly for the 2nd district from 1943 to 1947.

Prior to that, Denny also served on the Siskiyou County Board of Supervisors.
