= Just, Melvin: Just Evil =

- Directed by: James Ronald Whitney
- Written by: James Ronald Whitney
- Produced by: James Ronald Whitney; Sheila Nevins (for HBO)
- Narrated by: James Ronald Whitney
- Cinematography: John Taggart
- Music by: Brent Argovitz; James Ronald Whitney
- Distributed by: HBO Films
- Release dates: January 27, 2000 (Sundance Film Festival); April 22, 2001 (HBO)
- Running time: 96 minutes
- Country: United States
- Language: English
- Budget: <$500,000

Just, Melvin: Just Evil is a 2000 American documentary film by James Ronald Whitney about his grandfather, Melvin Just, and the devastating consequences of the sexual abuse that Just inflicted on their family. The film premiered at the 2000 Sundance Film Festival and aired on HBO on April 22, 2001. The film was well received overall; critic Roger Ebert called Just, Melvin "one of the most powerful documentaries I've seen."

== Synopsis ==
James Ronald Whitney, at the time a Wall Street executive, returns to his rural hometown of Carlotta, California, and interviews his family members about his maternal stepgrandfather, Melvin E. Just. Just sexually abused ten of Whitney's relatives, including his mother, uncle, aunts and step-aunts, some as young as two years old. The abuse resulted in dysfunction spanning three generations of Whitney's family. Several of his aunts discuss their struggles with alcohol and drug addiction, and bouts of homelessness and prostitution.

It is revealed throughout the course of the film that Just molested and/or raped both his step- and biological children resulting from his successive marriages to Fay and Venise. These children include the twins Jeanette and Jan, Ann (Whitney's mother), Jim (from Fay's prior marriage to a man named Elmer), and June and Jerri, the children born during her marriage to Just. Additionally, Just was accused of these same acts against Pambi and her half-sisters through Venise, Denise and Bobbie, and Jenise, the sole child of the marriage of Venise and Just.

Just's first wife, Fay (Whitney's grandmother), and mother of six of Just's children/step-children is interviewed throughout and shows naivete, alternating between whether she knew or believed before charges were brought, when it was happening, or whether she believed it immediately after Just left her for another woman. Whitney's Uncle Jim is caretaker to a feeble, aged Fay and laughingly recalls pulling three of her teeth out with pliers. His sisters seem to dislike this arrangement but keep their distance from both as Jim has propositioned two of his half-sisters to live with him "as his wife", while he cares for Fay. Jim states what happens between two consenting adults is fine, then mumbles a tirade about fathers sleeping with their daughters. Both of his half-sisters vehemently turn him down. Whitney then reveals he was molested by an uncle at the age of 6.

Just's second (and then-current) wife, Venice is mother to four of Just's children/step-children. Venice's interviews recall Just in a loving manner, discussing how difficult it was for her and subsequently Just when he was released to go about their daily business. She states that her daughter from a relationship prior to her marriage with Just was "seeking attention all the time", when in reality, her daughter, Pambi, was actually severely disabled due to Ehlers–Danlos syndrome, being born with one of the more rare forms that includes clubbed feet. Jenise has two children who appear on the camera. Her daughter Clarissa (age 12) reveals she was molested at age 7. Whitney does not press the issue and allows Clarissa to speak freely, so Clarissa never names her molester, though it is implied that it is Just as he asks why she would want to feel close to Just. Showing the cycle of abuse through the generations, Clarissa notes that she feels sad, "but he is family and I love him".

In the film, Whitney confronts Just on camera about the accusations. Just denies all the accusations, although he was convicted in 1979 of 12 counts of child molestation in his family and sentenced to 13 years in prison. He served fewer than nine years. It is further revealed that his aunt, Pambi, was actually severely injured during one of her rapes, where he placed his legs on top of hers to commit the crime. She required multiple surgeries and for over 30 years (at the time of the documentary) had worn leg braces off and on. Her gait is severely affected dating to the hip injuries she sustained.

In addition to the sexual abuse, three of Whitney's aunts say they witnessed Just rape and murder retired nurse Josephine Spegel, who was acting as a social worker. Spegel had arrived to check on the children's welfare only to find Just in bed with his stepdaughter. Just was a suspect in her murder and the documentary interviews Detective Lonnie Lawson. Lawson is convinced of Just's guilt in the murder and notes Just failed his polygraph where a "deceptive" rating is -7, while Just scores a -16, indicating massive deception. Lawson reveals he believes there is more than enough evidence to charge Just with murder, but California declined as Just's doctors in Washington claim he is unfit to stand trial. Just was ultimately never charged in the case, which remains officially unsolved. Towards the end of the film, Whitney asks when the last time he molested one of his children was, Pambi reveals that her stepfather propositioned her just two years before the documentary was filmed. She alleges he took her into the woods, threatened her as she could not run - as she had braces on her legs at that time - and paid her for sex, demonstrating that up until Just was paralyzed, his reign of molestation and terror continued through the adult life of at least one of the children. Whitney's final scene is dedicated to his aunts visiting Just in the nursing home. Several are severely conflicted and cannot face him, while others hug and kiss him. One aunt runs to him and calls him "Daddy" and hugs him. Pambi is seen giving him a hug, but looking rather apprehensive.

The film ends with Whitney revealing just a few months after filming finished, Just "just died", age 71. The credits roll as audio begins to play from Just's funeral. The text credits are interspersed with video, revealing the daughters to struggle between extreme grief and extreme hate, as the clergyman attempts to conduct the ceremony. Several of Whitney's aunts interrupt the clergyman to say how awful Just was, while a few others discuss how much they love him and "we all have our faults".

== Reception ==
Just, Melvin is critically acclaimed and received mostly positive reviews. It holds an 86% approval rate on film review aggregator Rotten Tomatoes.

Critic Roger Ebert summarized Just, Melvin as a "lacerating portrait of a monster," while praising Whitney's documenting of his own family: "His film is not only devastating but subtle in its artistry, with great attention to a soundtrack that suggests the echoes of long-ago words of hate and current painful memories. Nothing in the film quite prepares us for the closing scenes at a burial service, where a pastor reads futile words of comfort while drunken family members alternate between grief and rage."

Michael Carlson, writing for The Daily Telegraph, praised the film despite its shocking content. "Yet, for all its shocks, Just, Melvin is not a work of morbid depression or a confessional freak show. It is, rather, a challenging film that reveals the real cost of abuse but, also, the deep strength of familial love."

David Zurawik of The Baltimore Sun wrote that HBO should be commended for daring to air such a graphic documentary right after its hit Sunday night show, The Sopranos: "The kind of incest and stepchild molestation this film explores is exactly the kind of ugly secret too many of us are all too happy to ignore in the name of propriety, while innocent victims not only have their childhood violated but also their ability to enjoy their adult lives destroyed. This is the kind of documentary that is behind HBO winning all those Emmy, Oscar and Peabody awards."

Emanuel Levy, reviewing Just, Melvin for Variety, was more critical, writing that the documentary was less engaging than it could have been due to its "remote" tone. He wrote, "Scandalous testimony relates how Melvin was paying the girls from 25 cents to one dollar, depending on the depth of penetration, and how he forced them to get 'training' by using crayons and hot dogs. However shocking such disclosures are, they're often presented in a manner that diminishes their emotional effect. Overall, this richly detailed docu suffers from an unnecessarily cluttered structure, which makes it difficult to unravel the family links among its numerous victims."

== Awards ==
Just, Melvin: Just Evil was nominated for the Grand Jury Prize at the 2000 Sundance Film Festival and the "Truer Than Fiction Award" at the Independent Spirit Awards. It won awards at the Santa Barbara International Film Festival, South Beach Film Festival, Vancouver International Film Festival and Newport Beach Film Festival.
