= Frank P. Belotti =

American politician

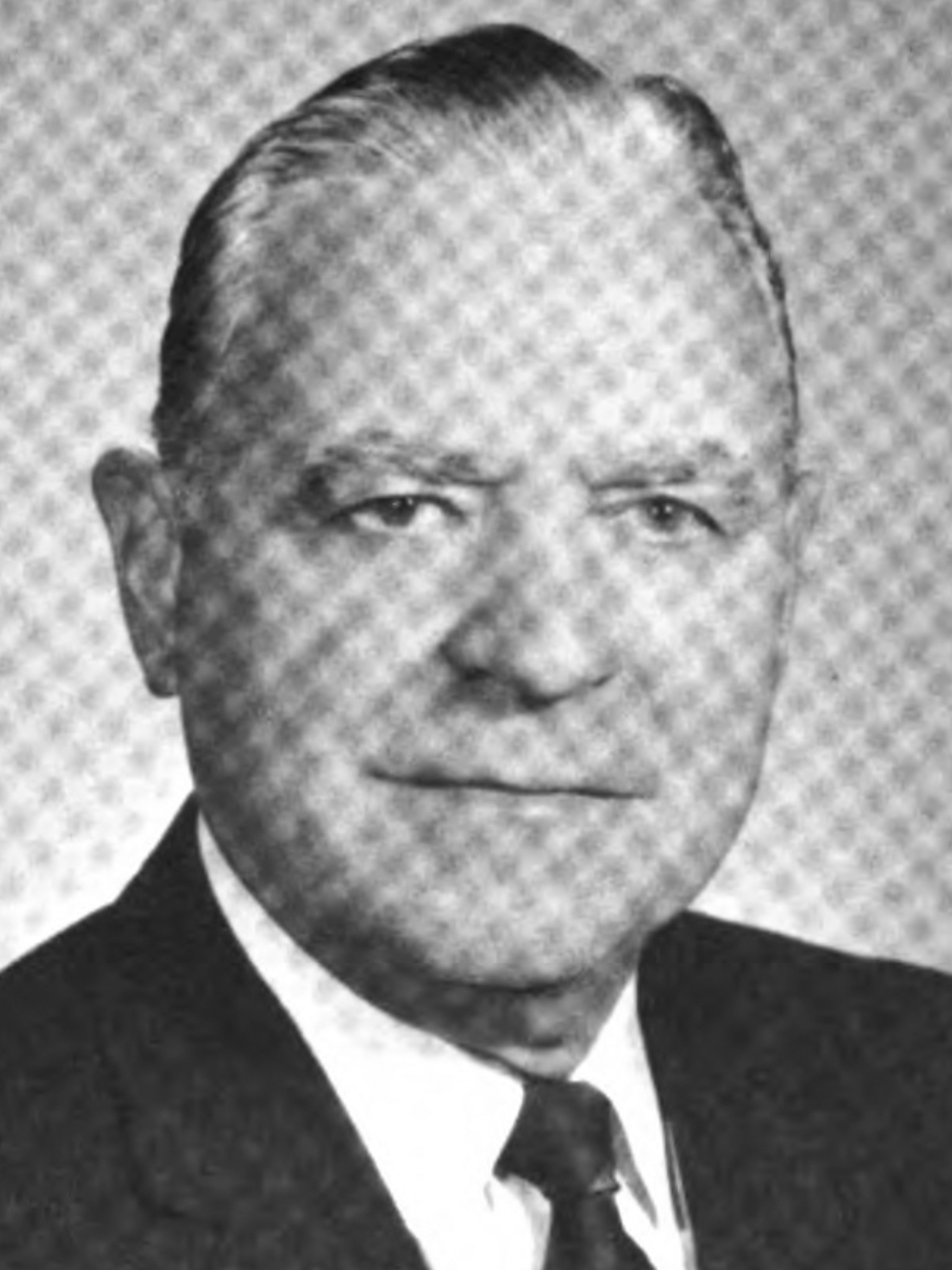

Member of the California State Assembly
- In office January 8, 1951 – November 30, 1972
- Preceded by: Arthur William Way
- Succeeded by: Barry Keene
- Constituency: 1st district (1951–1967); 2nd district (1967–1972)

Personal details
- Born: January 3, 1898
- Died: November 30, 1972 (aged 74)
- Party: Republican
- Spouse: Delphine Moranda (m. 1934–1972)
- Education: Valparaiso Technical Institute; Valparaiso University

Frank P. Belotti (January 3, 1898 – November 30, 1972) was a Republican California State Assemblyman from 1951 to 1972. Due to redistricting, he represented both the 1st and 2nd Assembly districts over his career. A bridge, two parts of Route 101, and the main hall of the Humboldt County Fairgrounds are named for him.

== Early years ==
Belotti studied at a business college in Massachusetts and earned two business degrees in Valparaiso, Indiana. He moved to California in 1924 and worked as a telegraph operator until 1926, when he became a mink rancher near Eureka, California.

== Political career ==
Belotti served as a member of the California State Assembly from 1951 until his death in office in 1972. From 1951 to 1962, Belotti's 1st District included Del Norte, Humboldt and Mendocino counties when Lake County was added to the district.

In 1966 reapportionment resulted in Belotti representing the 2nd District, which included parts of Humboldt, Mendocino and Sonoma counties. Belotti sponsored legislation related to North Coast issues of access, water, harbors, logging, lumber, agriculture and conservation.

Belotti worked for and secured legislation to preserve the Avenue of the Giants during the Highway 101 freeway bypass of the redwood groves.

== Memberships ==
Belotti was a member of the Humboldt County Planning Commission, Eureka Kiwanis Club, Humboldt Grange, Moose International, Commonwealth Club, Redwood Empire Association, Wool Growers, Farm Bureau Federation and Director of the California Marine Parks and Harbors Association.

== Places named for him ==
- Frank P. Belotti Freeway – Route 101 from Englewood to Sylvandale by House Resolution 461 in 1961.
- Frank P. Belotti Memorial Freeway – 22 miles of the Redwood Freeway (also Route 101) from Bridge 04-241 over the South Fork of the Eel River near Smith Point, to Myers Flat by Assembly Concurrent Resolution No. 54, Chapter 114, in 1994.
- Frank P. Belotti Memorial Bridge, bridge 04-212, over the South Fork of the Eel River near Garberville in Humboldt County.
- Frank P. Belotti Hall, at the Humboldt County Fairgrounds, Ferndale, California.

== Sources ==
- Faigin, Daniel P. "California Highways: Routes 97 through 104". cahighways.org.
- "Inventory of the Frank P. Belotti Papers" (pdf). Online Archive of California. California Secretary of State. 2004.
- Vassar, Alex; Shane Meyers. "Join California, Election History of the State of California".

California Assembly
Preceded by Arthur William Way	California State Assemblyman, 1st District; 1950–1966	Succeeded by Pauline L. Davis
Preceded by Pauline L. Davis	California State Assemblyman, 2nd District; 1966–1972	Succeeded by Barry Keene
