= Richard Dickerson =

American politician (1937–2014)

Richard "Dick" Dickerson

Member of the California State Assembly from the 2nd district
- In office December 7, 1998 – November 30, 2002
- Preceded by: Tom Woods
- Succeeded by: Doug LaMalfa

Personal details
- Born: July 7, 1937 Leadville, Colorado, U.S.
- Died: September 29, 2014 (aged 77) Redding, California, U.S.
- Party: Republican
- Spouse: Betty
- Children: 2

Richard "Dick" Dickerson (July 7, 1937 – September 29, 2014) was an American politician and law enforcement officer.

Dickerson was a native of Colorado who, following his discharge from the United States Army, settled in Southern California to begin a thirty-year career in law enforcement.

In 1986, Dickerson was sent to Redding by the California Department of Justice's Bureau of Narcotic Enforcement to organize and command the Shasta Interagency Narcotics Task Force (SINTF).

Following his retirement in 1993, Dickerson was appointed by Governor Pete Wilson to a vacancy on the Shasta County Board of Supervisors, and later he was elected to serve a four-year term. He served as a member of the California State Assembly (1998–2002). In 2002 he ran in the Republican primary for State Senate but was defeated by Sam Aanestad.

In the Redding community, at the time of his death, he served on the board of directors of the Shasta County Youth Violence Prevention Council and twice served as Chair of the United Way Campaign. He was past president of the Shasta County Peace Officers Association, Redding Rodeo Association Board of Directors and the Emergency Services Foundation. He was a member of the Veterans of Foreign Wars and the American Legion.

Dickerson was elected to the Redding City Council in 2004 and reelected in 2008. As a city councilor he rotated with the other members in the position of Mayor of Redding. He was narrowly defeated for reelection in 2012 by Gary Cadd. Dickerson lived with his wife Betty. He had two children and five grandchildren.

Dickerson died in Redding on September 29, 2014, after several months of illness.

California Assembly
| Preceded by Tom Woods | California State Assemblyman, 2nd District; 1998–2002 | Succeeded by Doug LaMalfa |
