= J. G. Murray =

American politician

John Gallagher Murray (November 1, 1841 – May 6, 1906) was an American politician. He served in the California State Assembly and represented the 2nd district.
