= Cuddeback Union School District =

School district in California, United States

Address
- 300 Wilder Road Carlotta, California, 95528; United States

District information
- Type: Public
- Grades: K–8
- NCES District ID: 0610230

Students and staff
- Students: 133
- Teachers: 7.0 (FTE)
- Staff: 11.15 (FTE)
- Student–teacher ratio: 19.0

Other information
- Website: www.cuddebackschool.org

The Cuddeback Union School District (also, Cuddeback Elementary School District), headquartered in Carlotta, California, oversees public education, through grade 8, in a portion of central Humboldt County, California. The school it operates is the Cuddeback School in Carlotta.

As of 2022, the school board consisted of five members:

- Todd Calvo
- Harry Dibble
- Jacob Morss
- Leonard Ward
- Erik Bess

In 2022, the superintendent was Blaine Sigler.
