= Arthur William Way =

California politician

Arthur Way
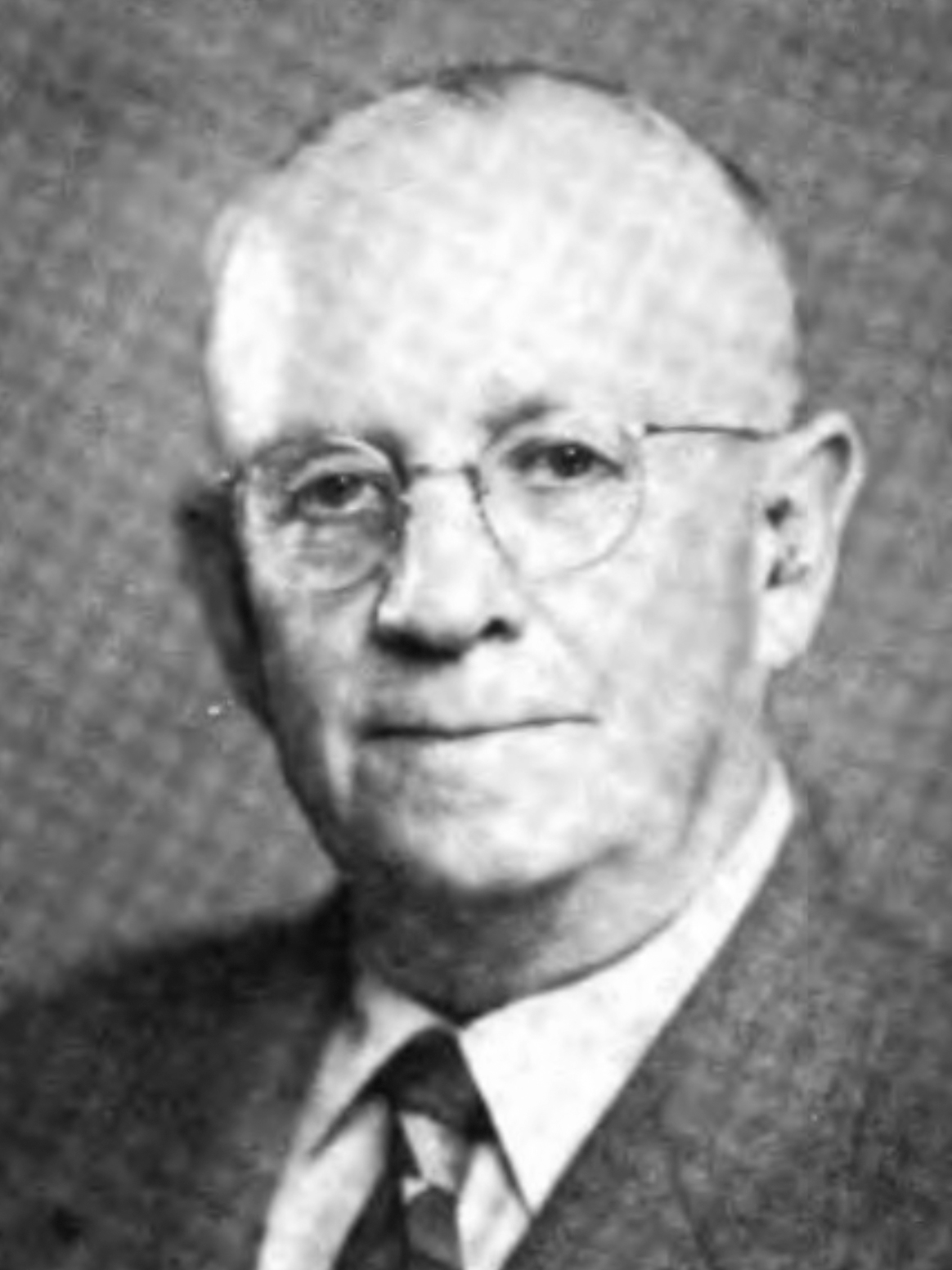
- Official portrait, 1950

Member of the California Senate from the 3rd district
- In office January 5, 1953 – January 7, 1957
- Preceded by: Michael J. Burns
- Succeeded by: Carl L. Christensen Jr.

Member of the California State Assembly from the 1st district
- In office January 3, 1949 – November 18, 1949
- Preceded by: Michael J. Burns
- Succeeded by: Frank Belotti

Personal details
- Born: March 5, 1879 Eureka, California, US
- Died: February 21, 1964 (aged 84) Eureka, California, US
- Party: Republican
- Spouse(s): Blanche Johnston (m. 1908; died 1945) Dorothy Ann Flower (m. 1950)
- Children: 1

Arthur William Way (March 5, 1879 – February 21, 1964) was a California politician.

Way was born in Eureka, California. From 1925 to 1929 he served as Mayor of Eureka. A park was named after him. He also served as state assembly member from January 3, 1949, until he resigned on November 18, 1949. Way ran for the 3rd Senate district after Michael J. Burns died in office and won in a special election unopposed.

Way died on February 21, 1964, in his hospital bed from a stroke.
