= Bridgeville Elementary School District =

School district in California

Address
- 38717 Kneeland Road Bridgeville, California, 95526; United States
- Coordinates: 40°28′10″N 123°47′59″W

District information
- Type: Public
- Grades: K–8
- NCES District ID: 0606000

Students and staff
- Students: 43
- Teachers: 3.0 (FTE)
- Staff: 6.3 (FTE)
- Student–teacher ratio: 14.33

Other information
- Website: www.bridgevilleschool.org

The "Bridgeville Elementary School District" is a school district in Bridgeville, California. It offers classes from kindergarten through grade 8, in a portion of eastern Humboldt County, California. It operates the Bridgeville School in Bridgeville.
