= A. W. Hill =

American politician

Arthur Wellesley Hill (born September 18, 1864) He served in the California State Assembly and represented the 2nd district.
