= Pauline Davis (politician) =

American politician

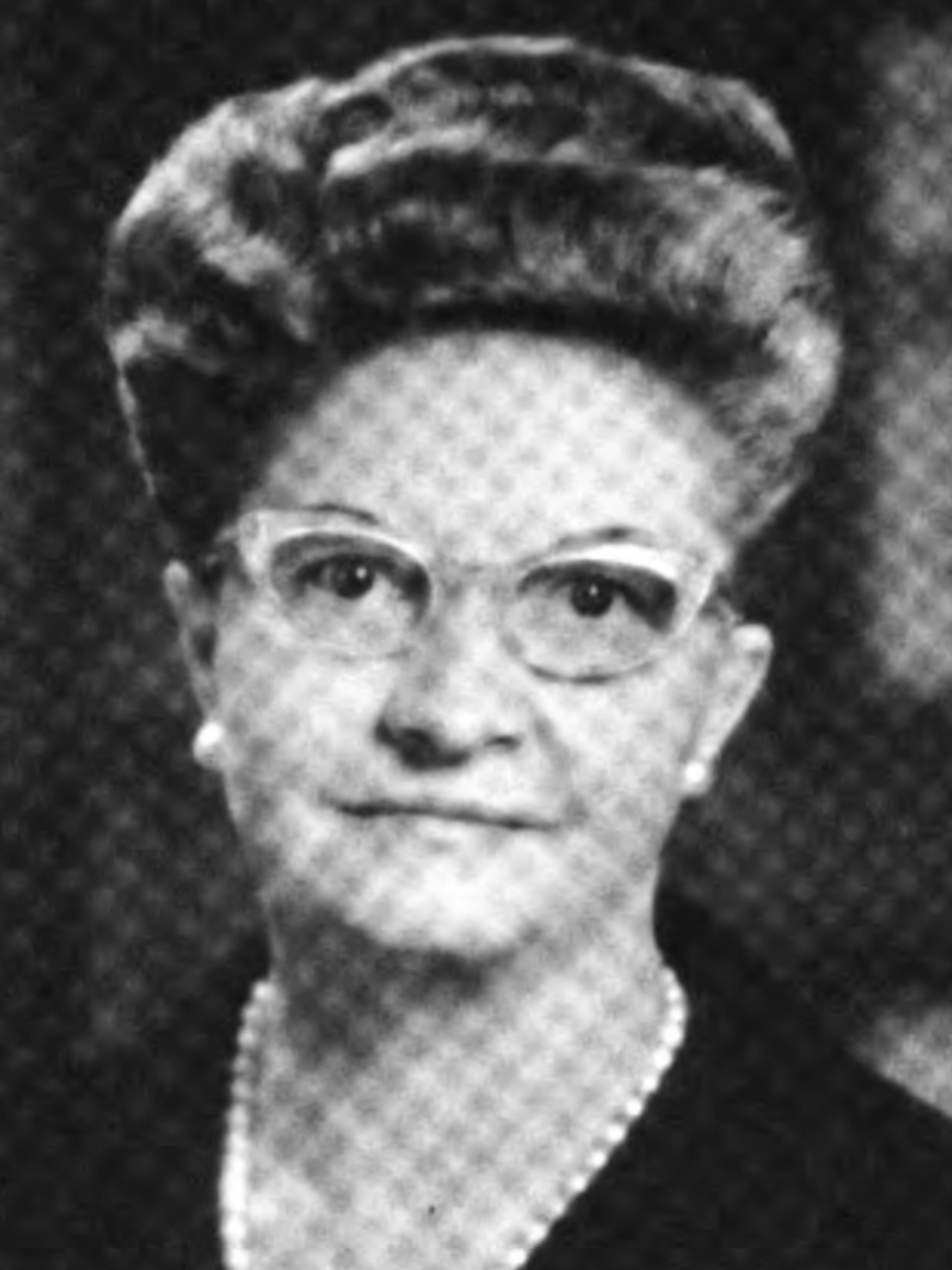
- Official portrait, 1967

Member of the California State Assembly
- In office January 5, 1953 – November 30, 1976
- Preceded by: Lester Thomas Davis
- Succeeded by: Stan Statham
- Constituency: 2nd district (1953–1967); 1st district (1967–1976)

Personal details
- Born: January 3, 1917 Verdigre, Nebraska
- Died: December 14, 1995 (aged 78) Sacramento, California
- Party: Democratic
- Spouse: Lester Thomas Davis
- Children: 3

Pauline Lillian Vakoch Davis (January 3, 1917 – December 14, 1995) was an American politician and her career was the longest of any woman in either house of the California Legislature. She was one of the few women to serve in the California State Assembly from 1953 until she retired in 1976, including one stint between 1961 and 1966 when she was the only woman member in the Legislature. Sometimes called the "Lady of the Lakes" for her advocacy of recreational and water development projects in California's rural areas, she was a Democrat who represented the 2nd District, an area encompassing several counties in the state's Shasta Cascade region, from 1953 until 1966. Following redistricting for the 1966 elections, she became the representative for the 1st District, which encompassed generally the same area. Davis represented the 1st District from 1966 until her retirement in 1976. She was originally elected to the Assembly following the May 23, 1952 death of her husband Lester Thomas Davis, who had served in the Assembly since 1947. As an Assembly member representing a nine-county mountain district that would eventually serve as the source of water for the State Water Project, Davis battled to protect the interests of her constituents. Davis's interests included, in addition to water development and recreation, fish and wildlife enhancement, emergency flood and relief laws, highway safety laws, problems of the lumber industry, and enhancement of youth programs at local fairs.

== Personal life ==
Davis was born on a pioneer ranch outside of Verdigre, Nebraska to parents of Czechoslovak descent and attended public schools in Fremont, Nebraska. She married in 1936, shortly after high school, had two daughters, and worked for Bell Telephone Company in Omaha, Nebraska as a long-distance conference telephone operator earning $17 per week. In 1942, during World War II, Davis requested to be transferred by Bell Telephone Company to Stockton, California, to join her husband who had been transferred there by the Western Pacific Railroad. This attempt to "make another try at that marriage" was unsuccessful and the couple divorced. Following the divorce, she met Lester Thomas Davis, eleven years her senior, on a blind date set up by acquaintances of the pair. Lester Davis, at that time, was a Western Pacific Railroad engineer, himself divorced, with a son, and running a Democratic campaign for Assemblyman in a district covering several rural Northern California counties. Davis found Lester Davis's prospects as a part-time Assemblyman less appealing than his better paying job as a railroad engineer, however Lester Davis assured her he wouldn't stay in the position very long so she "went along with it." The two married in 1947 in Berkeley, California and moved with both of Davis's daughters, whom Lester Davis adopted, as well as Lester Davis's 16-year-old son, to Portola, California.

Upon Lester Davis's inauguration in 1947, Davis became his sole staffer both in the Capitol in Sacramento, California and also in his "District office" in Portola, which was their home. The arrangement provided extra income and allowed them to remain together in what Davis called "a very happy marriage." On Valentine's Day in 1949, Davis gave birth to Rodney Davis, who would later become a justice on the Third District Court of Appeal.

== Political career ==
On May 23, 1952, Lester Davis died at home from thrombosis while writing a speech as part of the campaign for his fourth Assembly term. Even though he died, he received the majority of primary votes. The Democratic party implored Davis to step in as a write-in candidate and run for her husband's seat. She refused citing the debt from her husband's primary and that she was now widowed with three children still at home, the youngest three years old. She eventually relented on a promise of $5,000 in campaign donations. When that promise seemed to evaporate, she refused to turn in her papers to the Secretary of State until the money was delivered. Nevertheless, John Bryant, a real estate man and her Republican opponent, considered her candidacy so much of a joke that while she was campaigning in Tulelake, he openly mocked her with two other men as she was walking down the street.

When Davis won her election, she was seated on the Assembly floor in the same chair as her late husband and remained in that seat, number 68, for all of her years in office. At the time of her swearing in, she was one of only three women, the other two being Kathryn Niehouse and Dorothy Donahue.

While in the Legislature, Davis found it necessary to immerse herself in water policy, leaning on George Murphy and J.D. Strauss in the Office of Legislative Counsel for guidance who were both experts in water law. This knowledge served her well when in 1959, Edmund Gerald "Pat" Brown was elected Governor and determined to build the State Water Project both as what he consider crucial to the state's growth and to cement his own legacy stating, "I wanted this to be a monument to me." In 1959, the Legislature enacted the Burns-Porter Act, authorizing $1.75 billion for the construction of the State Water Project but, in order to do so, Brown was forced to appease Davis and others by signing a companion bill, the Davis-Grunsky Act, co-authored by Davis and Donald L. Grunsky, a Republican Senator from Watsonville, California. The Davis-Grunsky Act authorized $130 million of the State Water Project bond sales for development of local water projects, assumed to be most, if not all, in northern California. Davis followed this Legislative success with passage, in 1961, of the Davis-Dolwig Act, co-authored with Senator Richard J. Dolwig, from San Mateo County. The Davis-Dolwig Act required that the interests of recreation and fish and wildlife be recognized as part of the State Water Project, making the enhancement and preservation of fish and wildlife within the State Water Project the responsibility of the California Department of Water Resources. Importantly, while fish and wildlife enhancement was recognized as a cost to be borne by the public, the law required State Water Project water and power contractors to pay for actions to mitigate fish and wildlife affected by the project.

In addition to her work in the field of water, Davis was also Chair of the Fish and Game Committee from 1959 to 1963 and on the Conservation and Wildlife Committee from 1965 to 1967. She also did pioneering work to get roadside rest areas in California, which she recognized as a safety issue. In celebration of her efforts, there is a Lester T. Davis roadside rest in Plumas County, named in honor of her late husband. Another area of her Legislative interest was fairs and expositions. Davis had a long Legislative history of supporting fairs and expositions that dated back to when her late husband chaired the Fair Committee and she was the Committee secretary. Davis felt that fairs offered an opportunity for all of the people of the state, including BIPOC children in urban settings, to see agriculture, wildlife, and other animals. Davis's efforts were so extraordinary that she was honored by the Western Fairs Association January 25, 1977, at the Hotel Del Coronado with a film entitled "With All Due Respect, Pauline" and an evening that ended with a "perfect portrait [of Davis] set in sparkling lights." Some of Davis's many other legislative efforts included equal pay for equal work, supporting small rural schools, and protecting water quality.

== Death ==
Davis died at her home in Sacramento, California. At the time of her death, she had been under treatment for asbestos-caused lung cancer.

== Notes ==
California Assembly
| Preceded by Lester Thomas Davis | California State Assembly, 2nd District; 1952–1966 | Succeeded by Frank Belotti |
| Preceded by Frank Belotti | California State Assembly, 1st District; 1966–1976 | Succeeded by Stan Statham |
