= Melvin Parker Roberts =

American politician

Melvin Parker Roberts (April 21, 1842 – January 15, 1926) was an American politician. He served in the California State Assembly and represented the 2nd district.
