= Lester Thomas Davis =

American politician

Member of the California State Assembly from the 2nd district
- In office January 6, 1947 – May 3, 1952
- Preceded by: Paul Denny
- Succeeded by: Pauline Davis

Personal details
- Born: September 6, 1904 Liberal, Missouri
- Died: May 24, 1952 (aged 47) Portola, California
- Party: Democratic Party
- Spouse: Pauline Davis
- Children: 3

Lester Thomas Davis (September 6, 1904 – May 24, 1952) was an American politician.

Davis was born in Liberal, Missouri. He lived in Portola, California. Davis served in the California State Assembly from 1947 until his death in 1952 and was a Democrat. Davis died at his home in Portola, California from a heart attack. He wife Pauline Davis also served in the California State Assembly.
