= George Thomas Rolley =

American politician

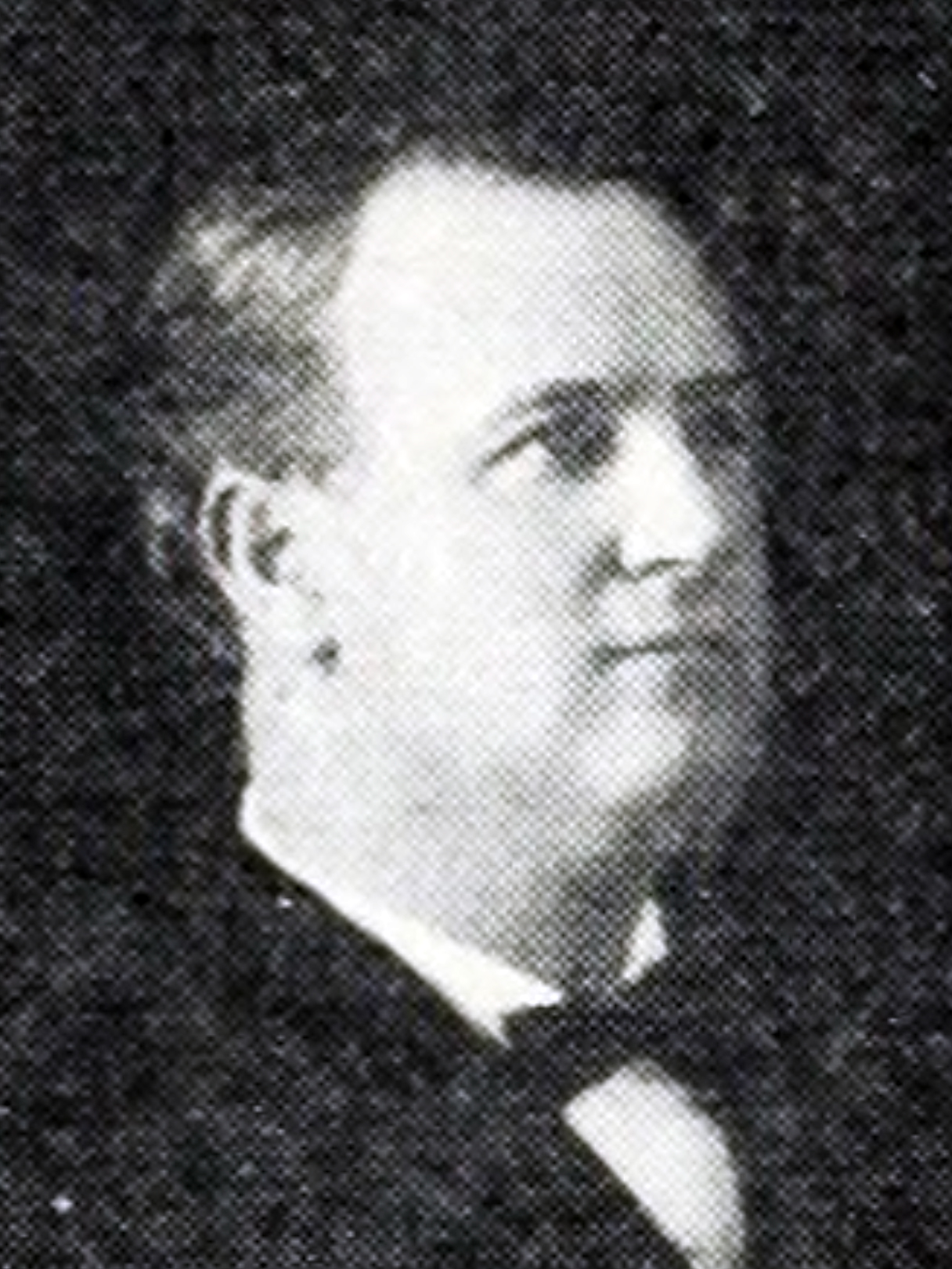

George Thomas Rolley (February 5, 1874 – January 16, 1916) was an American politician. He served in the California State Assembly and the California State Senate. He was a Republican.
