= John Francis Quinn (California politician) =

American politician

John Francis Quinn (born April 13, 1875) was an American politician. He served in the California State Assembly and represented the 2nd district.
