= Carl L. Christensen Jr. =

American politician (1907–1976)

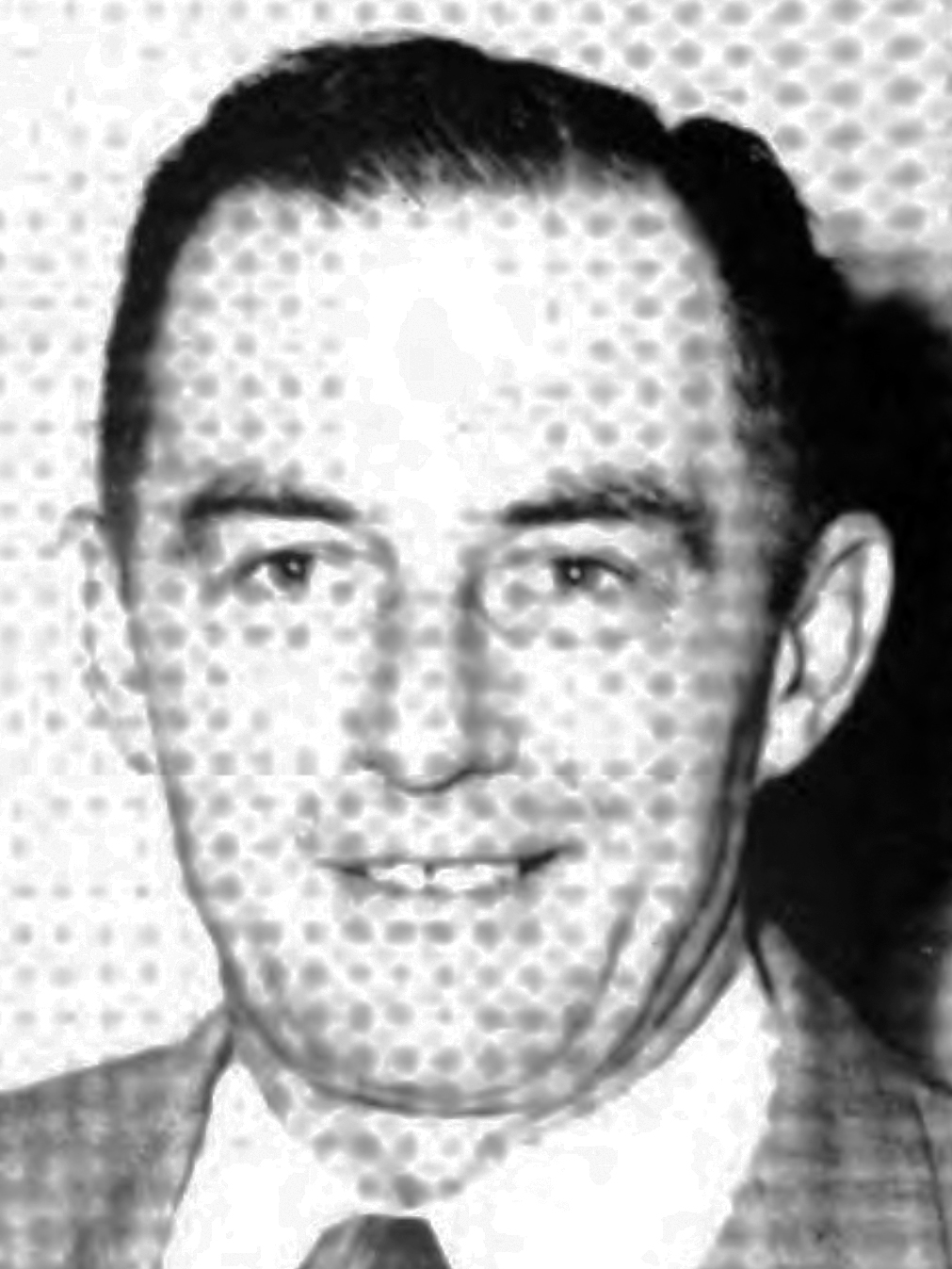

Member of the California Senate from the 3rd district
- In office January 7, 1957 – January 2, 1967
- Preceded by: Arthur William Way
- Succeeded by: Stephen P. Teale

Personal details
- Born: November 4, 1907
- Died: September 6, 1976 (aged 68)
- Party: Democratic
- Children: 2

Military service
- Branch/service: United States Navy
- Battles/wars: World War II

Carl L. Christensen Jr. (November 4, 1907 – September 6, 1976) served in the California State Senate for the 3rd district from 1957 to 1967 and during World War II he served in the United States Navy.
