= Fort Seward, California =

Unincorporated community in California, United States

Fort Seward
- Unincorporated community
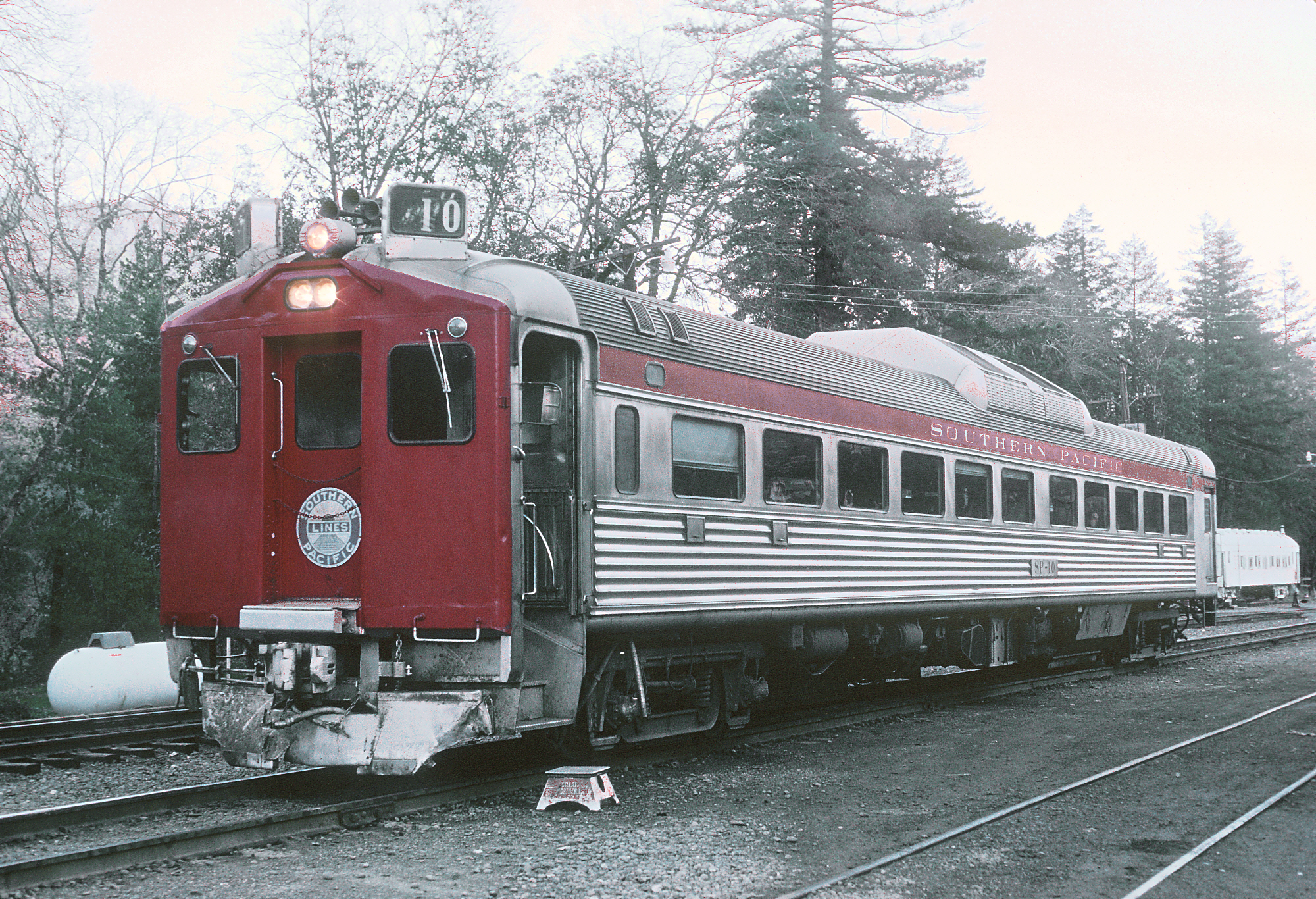
- Northwestern Pacific Railroad train at Fort Seward in 1971

- Location in California Fort Seward (the United States)
- Coordinates: 40°13′23″N 123°38′36″W
- Country: United States
- State: California
- County: Humboldt
- Elevation: 330 ft (100 m)

Fort Seward is an unincorporated community in Humboldt County, California, United States. It is located on the Eel River, 3.5 miles (5.6 km) north-northwest of Alderpoint, at an elevation of 328 feet (100 m). The name honors William H. Seward, Secretary of State under President Abraham Lincoln.

== History ==
A military camp called Fort Seward was established during the Bald Hills War on September 25, 1861, by Major Charles S. Lovell following a series of skirmishes with the Indians along the Eel River. It was built on the location recommended by Lieutenant Joseph B. Collins, U.S. 4th Infantry Regiment:

"The best position for a post is, in my opinion, on Eel River, near the head of Larrabee Creek, about sixty-five miles southeast from Fort Humboldt. It should be built immediately, and garrisoned by at least one full company, with a sufficient number of mules and riding saddles to mount a party large enough (say thirty) to follow rapidly and chastise all Indians that may commit depredations within fifty miles of it. This I believe will soon put a stop to all depredations and give ample security to the inhabitants and their property. Without a post but little can be accomplished and proper protection is almost impossible. The roads will be good for pack animals during the dry season, and the facilities for building good; that is, for small dry houses."

Fort Seward was decommissioned in 1862. It was later the site where the captured Lassic Wailaki leader during the Bald Hills War and his men were killed by local militiamen in January 1863.

A post office operated at Fort Seward from 1912 to 1972. Fort Seward was served by passenger service on the Northwestern Pacific Railroad until 1971.
