= Clinton J. Fulcher =

American politician

Clinton J. Fulcher (October 10, 1888 – May 26, 1955) was an American politician. He served in the California State Assembly and represented the 2nd district.
