= Joseph Russ (California politician) =

American politician

Joseph Russ (December 19, 1825 – October 8, 1886) was an American politician. He served in the California State Assembly. He was a Republican.

Russ died on October 8, 1886, in Alameda, California, at the age of 60.
