= Henry M. McGuinness =

Australian-born American politician

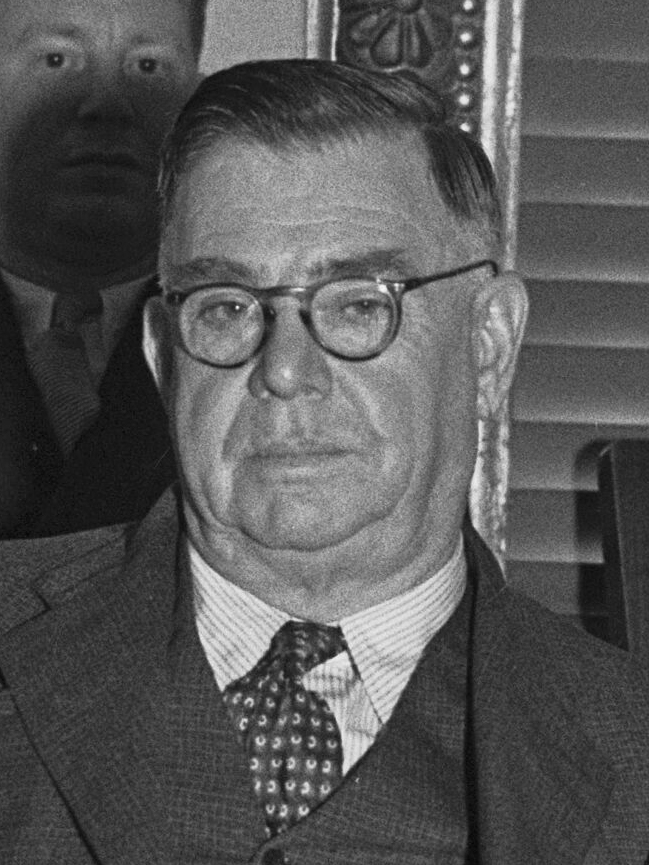

Henry M. McGuinness (October 4, 1875 – March 16, 1936) was an Australian-born American politician. He served in the California State Assembly and the California State Senate.
