= Lasić =

Lasić is a surname. Notable people with the surname include:

- Ana Lasić (born 1972), Slovenian screenwriter and playwright
- Davor Lasić (born 1966), Croatian footballer
- Frano Lasić (born 1954), Croatian actor and singer
- Maja Lasić (born 1979), Yugoslavian-born German politician
