= Charles Pryde Cutten =

American politician

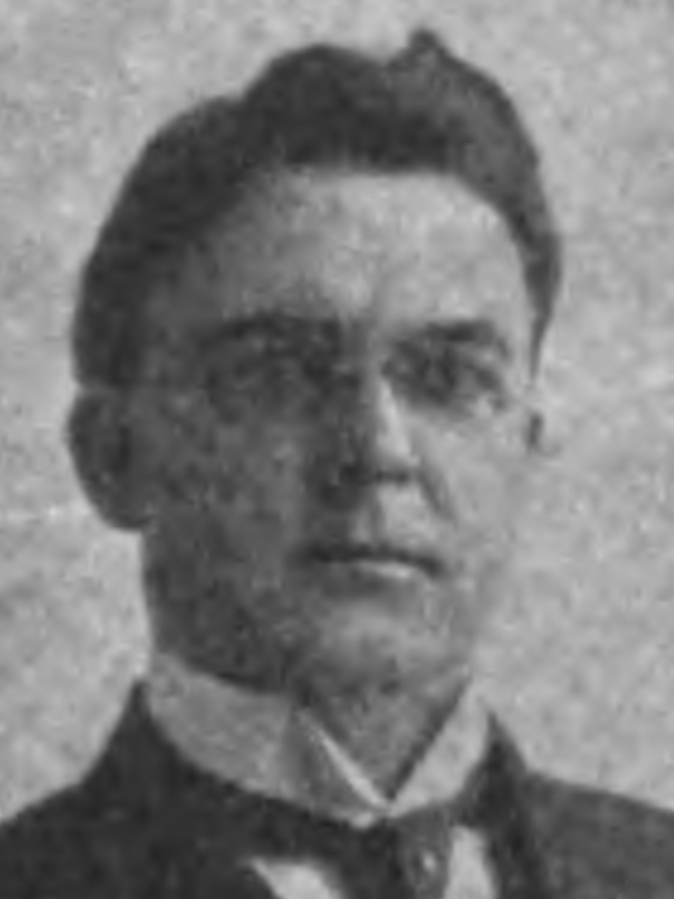

Charles Pryde Cutten (May 8, 1875 – September 15, 1943) was an American politician. He served in the California State Assembly and the California State Senate. He was a Republican.
