= Lassic =

Wailaki leader

Lassic (died 1863; also known as Las-sic, Lasseck and Lassux) was a Wailaki leader during the Bald Hills War.

== Role in the Bald Hills War ==
During the 1859-1862 period of the Bald Hills War, the Wailaki, especially Lassic's band, succeeded in driving many of the settlers out of their territory in southeastern and southwestern Humboldt County. This was despite the efforts of the local settler militia opposing them. Finally Federal troops began operating against them with the help of the locals. First Lieutenant, Joseph B Collins, of the Fourth Infantry reported his clash in 1861 with Lassic's band in the Kettenshaw Valley:

June 16, attacked a rancheria near Kettenshaw Valley; killed 4 Indians. Corporal Larrabee, of the volunteers, wounded in the left arm by an arrow. This rancheria was occupied by Las-sic's band, probably the most desperate and troublesome Indians in the mountains. They have frequently been engaged in murdering whites, burning houses, and killing horses and cattle. I regret so few of them were killed, but they were constantly on the alert and could only be caught by following them day and night, the troops carrying their provisions and blankets on their backs. The attack was made near noon, and as be Indians were prepared for it, many of them escaped through the almost impassable bushes.

California Volunteers replaced the Federal troops after the beginning of the American Civil War and continued aggressive patrolling. Finally Lassic and his band were driven to surrender on July 31, 1862, to Captain Ketcham at Fort Baker, with thirty-two other Indians. Twelve more of his warriors came in on August 10. The 212 captured Indians at Fort Baker were sent to join 462 others at Fort Humboldt and held for a time in the makeshift prison created out on the Samoa Peninsula in Humboldt Bay. In September 834 Indians were then sent on the steamship SS Panama to the Smith River Indian Reservation near Crescent City.

However, in early October, Lassic and three hundred natives, mostly warriors, had escaped the Smith River Reservation, followed by the exodus of more natives from the reservation through November.

== Death ==
=== Newspaper and Official accounts ===
After Lassic's escape he moved down the Kalmath River to the mountains and returned to his homeland. There he continued to carry on a campaign of resistance against the settlers until he was eventually recaptured by local militia. On Saturday, January 3, 1863, the Weekly Humboldt Times, reported:

All Right. --- We learn from Mr. Gilkey who arrived on Tuesday, from Long Valley, that the noted Indian Lassux, was in the hands of the whites at Fort Seward. He is probably in the spirit land before this. He was the head of the band taken from the vicinity of Fort Baker, last summer, to Smith River Reservation. Not liking the grub set before him there by father Hansen, he led his band back to the land of pork and beef. He will need no "cast off garments" at the reservation he now inhabits.

Lassic with a number of his men were killed at Fort Seward. According to the January 23, 1863 Humboldt Times account they were being escorted to the Round Valley Reservation:

but "on the way they took cold and died." This, at least, is the way we get the word. But knowing, them as we do, the animosity existing between these Indians and the whites inhabiting the region of the Humboldt mail route, and the numerous depredations supposed to have been committed by them, we suspect the "cold" they died with was mainly cold lead.

An official report was made about the incident by Captain, C. D. Douglas, Commander of Fort Wright:

FORT WRIGHT CAL., February 8, 1863.

Lieut. Col. R. C. DRUM,

Assistant Adjutant-General, Department of the Pacific:

SIR: I have the honor to report for the information of the general commanding the department that the band of Indians known as the Wylackees has killed a large number of horses and cattle on the settlements of this valley in the last month. They killed eight or nine head of horses, the property of Mr. Owens, a few days ago, and I have seen myself a number of cattle in the valley wounded by their arrows. Messrs. Owens and Eberlee came to me a few days ago and reported that the Indians had killed the above number of horses. I sent one of my sergeants with them to investigate the matter, and he reports that he saw the remains of what he supposed to be eight or nine horses; he also reports that he followed the Indians' trail from where they killed the horses to within a short distance of Eel River, and he thinks there were about forty Indians in the band. I have just been informed by Colonel Henley that five or six of the settlers followed this band of Wylackees last week, and he believes that a few of the band were killed. He did not inform me of the names of the settlers that went out. I request, therefore, to be instructed as to my duty in this matter, whether these men that killed the Indians should be arrested or let alone. I do not consider that I have any power to send out any troops from this post to capture, kill, or in any way punish these Indians, as I was not sent here for that purpose. But these Indians should be punished, as they are, and according to all reports always were, bad Indians.

Very respectfully, your obedient servant,

C. D. DOUGLAS,

Captain, Second Infantry California Volunteers, Comdg. Post.

=== Lucy Young's account ===
Many years later a different account of the killings of the forty Wailaki prisoners including Lassic was told by a Wailaki witness and relative of Lassic, Lucy Young:

At last I come home. Mother at Fort Seward. Before I get there, I see big fire in lots down timber and treetops. Same time awful funny smell. I think someone get lots of wood.

I go on to house. Everybody crying. Mother tell me, "All our men killed now." She say white men there, others come from Round Valley, Humboldt County too, kill our old uncle, Chief Lassic, and all other men. Stood up about forty Inyan in a row with rope around neck. "What's this for?" Chief Lassic say. "To hang you dirty dogs," white men tell it. "Hanging, that's dogs death," Chief Lassic say. "We done nothing to be hung for. Must die, shoot us."

So they shoot. All our men. Then build fire with wood and brush. Inyan been cut for days. Never know it their own funeral fire they fix.

Build big fire, burn all them bodies. That's funny smell I smell before I get to house. Make hair raise on back of my neck. Make sick stomach too.
