= Lawrence Creek (California) =

- Location within California Location within the United States

Physical characteristics
- Source
  - coordinates: 40.6704133°N 123.8789391°W
- Mouth
  - coordinates: 40.5804131°N 123.9928263°W

Lawrence Creek is a stream in Humboldt County, California, in the United States.

Lawrence Creek was named for a pioneer settler.

== See also ==
- List of rivers of California
