= California's 1st State Assembly district =

American legislative district

Current assemblymember
Heather Hadwick; R–Alturas
- Population: 512,334
- Demographics: 75.3% White; 1.1% Black; 12.7% Latino; 2.2% Asian; 1.8% Native American; 0.2% Hawaiian/Pacific Islander; 0.6% other; 6.1% remainder of multiracial
- Registration: 42.45% Republican; 29.25% Democratic; 17.24% No party preference

California's 1st State Assembly district is one of 80 California State Assembly districts. It is currently represented by Republican Heather Hadwick of Alturas.

== District profile ==
The district stretches along the northeastern edge of the state from the Oregon border to Lake Tahoe, wrapping around the Sacramento Valley along the northern Sierra Nevada. The district is primarily rural and solidly Republican and at 27, 276 square miles, is the largest assembly district by area in California.

All of Alpine County

- Markleeville

Amador County – part

- Jackson
- Sutter Creek

El Dorado County – part

- Pollock Pines
- South Lake Tahoe

All of Lassen County

- Susanville

All of Modoc County

- Alturas

All of Nevada County

- Grass Valley
- Nevada City
- Truckee

Placer County – part

- Colfax
- Kings Beach

All of Plumas County

- Portola
- Quincy

All of Shasta County

- Anderson
- Redding
- Shasta Lake

All of Sierra County

- Downieville
- Loyalton

All of Siskiyou County

- Dorris
- Dunsmuir
- Etna
- Fort Jones
- Montague
- Mount Shasta
- Tulelake
- Weed
- Yreka

== Election results from statewide races ==
Year	Office	Results
2024	President	Trump 56.6 - 40.5%
2021	Recall	Yes 61.8 – 38.2%
2020	President	Trump 56.3 - 41.4%
2018	Governor	Cox 61.2 – 38.8%
2018	Senator	De Leon 59.1 – 40.9%
2016	President	Trump 56.7 – 36.1%
2016	Senator	Harris 61.5 – 38.5%
2014	Governor	Kashkari 55.9 – 44.1%
2012	President	Romney 57.3 – 39.6%
2012	Senator	Emken 58.2 – 41.8%

== List of assembly members representing the district ==
Due to redistricting, the 1st district has been moved around different parts of the state. The current iteration resulted from the 2021 redistricting by the California Citizens Redistricting Commission.

=== 1851–1855: one seat ===
Assembly members	Party	Years served	Electoral history	Counties represented
John Cook (San Diego)	Whig	January 6, 1851 – January 5, 1852	Elected in 1850. [data missing]	San Diego
Agoston Haraszthy (San Diego)	Democratic	January 5, 1852 – January 3, 1853	Elected in 1851. [data missing]	San Diego
T. W. Tilgham (San Diego)	Democratic	January 3, 1853 – January 2, 1854	Elected in 1852. [data missing]	San Diego
Charles P. Noell (San Diego)	Democratic	January 2, 1854 – January 1, 1855	Elected in 1853. [data missing]	San Diego

=== 1855–1862: four seats ===
Dates	Seat A			Seat B			Seat C			Seat D			Counties represented
Dates	Member	Party	Electoral history	Member	Party	Electoral history	Member	Party	Electoral history	Member	Party	Electoral history	Counties represented
January 1, 1855 – January 7, 1856	Wilson W. Jones (Los Angeles)	Democratic	Elected in 1854. [data missing]	Francis Mellus (Los Angeles)	Whig	Elected in 1854. [data missing]	Jefferson Hunt (San Bernardino)	Democratic	Redistricted from the 2nd district and re-elected in 1854. Re-elected in 1855. Re-elected in 1856. Retired.	William C. Ferrell (San Diego)	Whig	Elected in 1854. [data missing]	San Diego, Los Angeles, San Bernardino
January 7, 1856 – January 5, 1857	J. Lancaster Brent (Los Angeles)	Democratic	Elected in 1855. Re-elected in 1856. [data missing]	John G. Downey (Los Angeles)	Democratic	Elected in 1855. [data missing]	Jefferson Hunt (San Bernardino)	Democratic	Redistricted from the 2nd district and re-elected in 1854. Re-elected in 1855. Re-elected in 1856. Retired.	Jeptha J. Kendrick (San Diego)	Democratic	Elected in 1855. Re-elected in 1856. [data missing]	San Diego, Los Angeles, San Bernardino
January 5, 1857 – January 4, 1858	J. Lancaster Brent (Los Angeles)	Democratic	Elected in 1855. Re-elected in 1856. [data missing]	Edward Hunter (El Monte)	Democratic	Elected in 1856. [data missing]	Jefferson Hunt (San Bernardino)	Democratic	Redistricted from the 2nd district and re-elected in 1854. Re-elected in 1855. Re-elected in 1856. Retired.	Jeptha J. Kendrick (San Diego)	Democratic	Elected in 1855. Re-elected in 1856. [data missing]	San Diego, Los Angeles, San Bernardino
January 4, 1858 – January 3, 1859	Henry Hancock (Los Angeles)	Democratic	Elected in 1857. Re-elected in 1858.	Andrés Pico (Los Angeles)	Whig	Elected in 1857. Re-elected in 1858. Retired to become a State Senator.	Isaac W. Smith (Cherry Valley)	Democratic	Elected in 1857. [data missing]	Robert W. Groom (San Diego)	Democratic	Elected in 1857. [data missing]	San Diego, Los Angeles, San Bernardino
January 3, 1859 – January 2, 1860	Henry Hancock (Los Angeles)	Democratic	Elected in 1857. Re-elected in 1858.	Andrés Pico (Los Angeles)	Whig	Elected in 1857. Re-elected in 1858. Retired to become a State Senator.	G. N. Whitman (San Bernardino)	Democratic	Elected in 1858. [data missing]	A. S. Ensworth (San Diego)	Democratic	Elected in 1858. [data missing]	San Diego, Los Angeles, San Bernardino
January 2, 1860 – January 7, 1861	A. J. King (Los Angeles)	Democratic	Elected in 1859. [data missing]	Jonathan J. Warner (Los Angeles)	Republican	Elected in 1859. [data missing]	W. A. Conn (San Bernardino)	Democratic	Elected in 1859. [data missing]	Robert W. Groom (San Diego)	Democratic	Elected in 1859. [data missing]	San Diego, Los Angeles, San Bernardino
January 7, 1861 – January 6, 1862	Charles W. Piercy (Los Angeles)	Douglas; Democratic	Elected in 1860. Killed in duel.	Murray Morrison (Los Angeles)	Beckenridge; Democratic	Elected in 1860. Redistricted to the 2nd district.	Abel Stearns (Los Angeles)	Douglas; Democratic	Elected in 1860. [data missing]	David B. Kurtz (San Diego)	Beckenridge; Democratic	Elected in 1860. [data missing]	San Diego, Los Angeles, San Bernardino
January 7, 1861 – January 6, 1862	Vacant			Murray Morrison (Los Angeles)	Beckenridge; Democratic	Elected in 1860. Redistricted to the 2nd district.	Abel Stearns (Los Angeles)	Douglas; Democratic	Elected in 1860. [data missing]	David B. Kurtz (San Diego)	Beckenridge; Democratic	Elected in 1860. [data missing]	San Diego, Los Angeles, San Bernardino

=== 1862–1885: two seats ===
Years	Seat A			Seat B			Counties represented
Years	Member	Party	Electoral history	Member	Party	Electoral history	Counties represented
January 6, 1862 – December 7, 1863	Ben Barton (San Bernardino)	Beckenridge; Democratic	Elected in 1861. [data missing]	D. B. Hoffman (San Diego)	Douglas; Democratic	Elected in 1861. [data missing]	San Diego, Los Angeles, San Bernardino
December 7, 1863 – December 4, 1865	R. G. Allen (San Bernardino)	Beckenridge; Democratic	Elected in 1862. [data missing]	George A. Johnson (San Diego)	Douglas; Democratic	Elected in 1862. [data missing]	San Diego, Los Angeles, San Bernardino
December 7, 1863 – December 4, 1865	A. Van Leuven (San Bernardino)	Union	Elected in 1863. [data missing]	Jeptha J. Kendrick (San Diego)	Democratic	Elected in 1863. Retired.	San Diego, Los Angeles, San Bernardino
December 4, 1865 – December 2, 1867	John W. Satterwhite (San Bernardino)	Democratic	Elected in 1865.	David B. Kurtz (San Diego)	Democratic	Elected in 1865. Unseated due to contest in 1866.	San Diego, Los Angeles, San Bernardino
December 4, 1865 – December 2, 1867	John W. Satterwhite (San Bernardino)	Democratic	Elected in 1865.	George A. Johnson (San Diego)	Union	Elected due to successful contest.	San Diego, Los Angeles, San Bernardino
December 2, 1867 – December 6, 1869	Benjamin I. Hayes (Los Angeles)	Democratic	Elected in 1867. [data missing]	John M. James (San Bernardino)	Democratic	Elected in 1867. [data missing]	San Diego, Los Angeles, San Bernardino
December 6, 1869 – December 4, 1871	John W. Satterwhite (San Bernardino)	Democratic	Elected in 1868. Resigned on August 4, 1869.	William N. Robinson (San Diego)	Democratic	Elected in 1868. [data missing]	San Diego, Los Angeles, San Bernardino
December 6, 1869 – December 4, 1871	Vacant			William N. Robinson (San Diego)	Democratic	Elected in 1868. [data missing]	San Diego, Los Angeles, San Bernardino
December 4, 1871 – December 1, 1873	George W. Dannals (San Diego)	Democratic	Elected in 1871. [data missing]	Fenton M. Slaughter (Chino)	Democratic	Elected in 1871. [data missing]	San Diego, Los Angeles, San Bernardino
December 1, 1873 – December 6, 1875	William W. Bowers (San Diego)	Republican	Elected in 1873. [data missing]	N. J. Pishon (San Bernardino)	Independent	Elected in 1873. [data missing]	San Diego, Los Angeles, San Bernardino
December 6, 1875 – December 3, 1877	James M. Pierce (San Diego)	Republican	Elected in 1875. [data missing]	Henry Suverkrup (San Bernardino)	Independent	Elected in 1875. [data missing]	San Diego, Los Angeles, San Bernardino
December 3, 1877 – January 5, 1880	Frederick N. Pauly (San Diego)	Republican	Elected in 1877. [data missing]	Byron Waters (San Bernardino)	Democratic	Elected in 1877. [data missing]	San Diego, Los Angeles, San Bernardino
January 5, 1880 – January 3, 1881	Henry M. Streeter (Riverside)	Republican	Elected in 1879. Re-elected in 1880. [data missing]	Charles C. Wattson (San Diego)	Republican	Elected in 1879. [data missing]	San Diego, Los Angeles, San Bernardino
January 3, 1881 – January 8, 1883	Henry M. Streeter (Riverside)	Republican	Elected in 1879. Re-elected in 1880. [data missing]	Elijah W. Hendrick (San Diego)	Republican	Elected in 1880. [data missing]	San Diego, Los Angeles, San Bernardino
January 8, 1883 – January 5, 1885	Edwin E. Parker (San Diego)	Republican	Elected in 1883. [data missing]	Truman Reeves (San Bernardino)	Republican	Elected in 1883. Redistricted to the 79th district.	San Diego, Los Angeles, San Bernardino

=== 1885–present: one seat ===
Assembly members	Party	Years served	Electoral history	Counties represented
J. K. Johnson (Crescent City)	Democratic	January 5, 1885 – January 3, 1887	Elected in 1884. [data missing]	Del Norte, Siskiyou
R. H. Campbell (Etna)	Republican	January 3, 1887 – January 7, 1889	Elected in 1896. Retired.	Del Norte, Siskiyou
John M. McVay (Eureka)	Democratic	January 7, 1889 – January 5, 1891	Elected in 1898. [data missing]	Del Norte, Siskiyou
George B. Robertson (Yreka)	Democratic	January 5, 1891 – January 2, 1893	Elected in 1890. [data missing]	Del Norte, Siskiyou
Thomas L. Duffy (Crescent City)	Democratic	January 2, 1893 – January 7, 1895	Elected in 1892. [data missing]	Del Norte, Siskiyou
Eugene S. Tomblin (Redding)	Republican	January 7, 1895 – January 4, 1897	Elected in 1894. [data missing]	Del Norte, Siskiyou
W. S. Strain (Bolinas)	Republican	January 4, 1897 – January 2, 1899	Elected in 1896. [data missing]	Del Norte, Siskiyou
C. B. Jilson (Napa)	Republican	January 2, 1899 – January 5, 1901	Elected in 1898. [data missing]	Del Norte, Siskiyou
T. J. T. Berry (Crescent City)	Republican	January 5, 1901 – January 5, 1903	Elected in 1900. [data missing]	Del Norte, Siskiyou
Clarence W. Leininger (Weaverville)	Republican	January 5, 1903 – January 2, 1905	Elected in 1902. [data missing]	Del Norte, Siskiyou
James L. Coyle (Trinity Center)	Republican	January 2, 1905 – January 7, 1907	Elected in 1904. [data missing]	Del Norte, Siskiyou, Trinity
T. J. T. Berry (Crescent City)	Republican	January 7, 1907 – January 4, 1909	Elected in 1906. [data missing]	Del Norte, Siskiyou, Trinity
Kenneth C. Gillis (Yreka)	Democratic	January 4, 1909 – January 2, 1911	Elected in 1908. [data missing]	Del Norte, Siskiyou, Trinity
George E. Malone (Dunsmuir)	Republican	January 2, 1911 – January 6, 1913	Elected in 1910. [data missing]	Del Norte, Siskiyou, Trinity
William B. Shearer (Yreka)	Democratic	January 6, 1913 – January 4, 1915	Elected in 1912. Retired to become a California State Senator.	Del Norte, Siskiyou
H. B. Ream (Sisson)	Democratic	January 4, 1915 – January 8, 1923	Elected in 1914. [data missing]	Del Norte, Siskiyou
G. H. Douglas (Crescent City)	Republican	January 8, 1923 – March 7, 1923	Elected in 1922. Died.	Del Norte, Siskiyou
Vacant		March 7, 1923 – January 5, 1925		Del Norte, Siskiyou
J. J. Murphy (Weed)	Republican	January 5, 1925 – January 7, 1929	Elected in 1924. Re-elected in 1926. [data missing]	Del Norte, Siskiyou
Henry M. McGuinness (Dunsmuir)	Republican	January 7, 1929 – January 5, 1931	Elected in 1928. Redistricted to the 2nd district.	Del Norte, Siskiyou
Robert F. Fisher (Carlotta)	Republican	January 5, 1931 – January 2, 1933	Redistricted from the 2nd district and re-elected in 1930. [data missing]	Del Norte, Humboldt
Michael J. Burns (Eureka)	Republican	January 2, 1933 – January 3, 1949	Elected in 1932. Re-elected in 1934. Re-elected in 1936. Re-elected in 1938. Re-elected in 1940. Re-elected in 1942. Re-elected in 1944. Re-elected in 1946. Retired to become a California State Senator.	Del Norte, Humboldt, Mendocino
Arthur W. Way (Eureka)	Republican	January 3, 1949 – November 18, 1949	Elected to finish Burns's term. Resigned to become a California State Senator.	Del Norte, Humboldt, Mendocino
Vacant		November 18, 1949 – January 8, 1951		Del Norte, Humboldt, Mendocino
Frank P. Belotti (Eureka)	Republican	January 8, 1951 – January 2, 1967	Elected in 1950. Re-elected in 1952. Re-elected in 1954. Re-elected in 1956. Re-elected in 1958. Re-elected in 1960. Re-elected in 1962. Re-elected in 1964. Redistricted to the 2nd district.	Del Norte, Humboldt, Mendocino
Frank P. Belotti (Eureka)	Republican	January 8, 1951 – January 2, 1967	Elected in 1950. Re-elected in 1952. Re-elected in 1954. Re-elected in 1956. Re-elected in 1958. Re-elected in 1960. Re-elected in 1962. Re-elected in 1964. Redistricted to the 2nd district.	Del Norte, Humboldt, Lake, Mendocino
Pauline Davis (Portola)	Democratic	January 2, 1967 – November 30, 1976	Redistricted from the 2nd district and re-elected in 1966. Re-elected in 1968. Re-elected in 1970. Re-elected in 1972. Re-elected in 1974. Retired.	Plumas, Del Norte, Lassen, Modoc, Shasta, Sierra, Siskiyou, Tehama, Trinity, Humboldt
Pauline Davis (Portola)	Democratic	January 2, 1967 – November 30, 1976	Redistricted from the 2nd district and re-elected in 1966. Re-elected in 1968. Re-elected in 1970. Re-elected in 1972. Re-elected in 1974. Retired.	Butte, Glenn, Lassen, Modoc, Plumas, Shasta, Siskiyou, Tehama, Trinity
Stan Statham (Chico)	Republican	December 6, 1976 – November 30, 1992	Elected in 1976. Re-elected in 1978. Re-elected in 1980. Re-elected in 1982. Re-elected in 1984. Re-elected in 1986. Re-elected in 1988. Re-elected in 1990. Redistricted to the 2nd district.	Butte, Glenn, Lassen, Modoc, Plumas, Shasta, Siskiyou, Tehama, Trinity
Dan Hauser (Arcata)	Democratic	December 7, 1992 – November 30, 1996	Redistricted from the 2nd district and re-elected in 1992. Re-elected in 1994. Term-limited and retired.	Del Norte, Humboldt, Lake, Mendocino, Sonoma
Virginia Strom-Martin (Duncans Mills)	Democratic	December 2, 1996 – November 30, 2002	Elected in 1996. Re-elected in 1998. Re-elected in 2000. Term-limited and retired.	Del Norte, Humboldt, Lake, Mendocino, Sonoma
Patty Berg (Eureka)	Democratic	December 2, 2002 – November 30, 2008	Elected in 2002. Re-elected in 2004. Re-elected in 2006. Term-limited and retired.	Del Norte, Humboldt, Lake, Mendocino, Sonoma, Trinity
Wesley Chesbro (Arcata)	Democratic	December 1, 2008 – November 30, 2012	Redistricted from the 2nd district and re-elected in 2008. Re-elected in 2010. Term-limited and retired.	Del Norte, Humboldt, Lake, Mendocino, Sonoma, Trinity
Brian Dahle (Bieber)	Republican	December 3, 2012 – June 12, 2019	Elected in 2012. Re-elected in 2014. Re-elected in 2016. Re-elected in 2018. Resigned to become a California State Senator.	Butte, Lassen, Modoc, Nevada, Placer, Plumas, Shasta, Sierra, Siskiyou
Vacant		June 12, 2019 – November 12, 2019		Butte, Lassen, Modoc, Nevada, Placer, Plumas, Shasta, Sierra, Siskiyou
Megan Dahle (Bieber)	Republican	November 12, 2019 – November 30, 2024	Elected to finish her husband's term. Re-elected in 2022. Retired to run for California State Senate.	Butte, Lassen, Modoc, Nevada, Placer, Plumas, Shasta, Sierra, Siskiyou
Heather Hadwick (Alturas)	Republican	December 2, 2024 – present	Elected in 2024.	Butte, Lassen, Modoc, Nevada, Placer, Plumas, Shasta, Sierra, Siskiyou

== Election results (1990-present) ==
=== 2024 ===
2024 California State Assembly 1st district election
Primary election
Party	Candidate	Votes	%
Republican	Heather Hadwick	41,939	35.6
Republican	Tenessa Audette	34,439	29.2
Republican	Mark Mezzano	30,090	25.5
Republican	Melissa Hunt	11,344	9.6
Total votes		117,812	100.0
General election
Republican	Heather Hadwick	125,387	59.8
Republican	Tenessa Audette	84,167	40.2
Total votes		209,554	100.0
Republican hold			

=== 2022 ===
2022 California State Assembly 1st district election
Primary election
Party	Candidate	Votes	%
Republican	Megan Dahle (incumbent)	79,201	52.5
Democratic	Belle Starr Sandwith	51,237	34.0
Republican	Kelly Tanner	17,577	11.6
Peace and Freedom	Joshua Brown	2,898	1.9
Total votes		150,913	100.0
General election
Republican	Megan Dahle (incumbent)	129,527	62.1
Democratic	Belle Starr Sandwith	79,068	37.9
Total votes		208,595	100.0
Republican hold			

=== 2020 ===
2020 California State Assembly 1st district election
Primary election
Party	Candidate	Votes	%
Republican	Megan Dahle (incumbent)	83,883	51.0
Democratic	Elizabeth L. Betancourt	64,948	39.5
No party preference	PK "Paul" Dhanuka	15,630	9.5
Total votes		164,461	100.0
General election
Republican	Megan Dahle (incumbent)	146,902	58.9
Democratic	Elizabeth L. Betancourt	102,541	41.1
Total votes		249,443	100.0
Republican hold			

=== 2019 (special) ===
2019 California State Assembly 1st district special election Vacancy resulting from the resignation of Brian Dahle
Primary election
Party	Candidate	Votes	%
Democratic	Elizabeth Betancourt	35,167	38.6
Republican	Megan Dahle	32,427	35.6
Republican	Patrick Henry Jones	17,010	18.7
Republican	Joe Turner	4,751	5.2
Republican	Lane Rickard	1,674	1.8
Total votes		91,029	100.0
General election
Republican	Megan Dahle	59,991	57.3
Democratic	Elizabeth Betancourt	44,618	42.7
Total votes		104,609	100.0
Republican hold			

=== 2018 ===
2018 California State Assembly 1st district election
Primary election
Party	Candidate	Votes	%
Republican	Brian Dahle (incumbent)	82,916	64.1
Democratic	Caleen Sisk	30,902	23.9
Democratic	Peter Van Peborgh	11,446	8.9
No party preference	Jenny O'Connell-Nowain	3,987	3.1
No party preference	Jerome B.C. Venus (write-in)	9	0.0
Total votes		129,260	100.0
General election
Republican	Brian Dahle (incumbent)	125,227	63.0
Democratic	Caleen Sisk	73,449	37.0
Total votes		198,676	100.0
Republican hold			

=== 2016 ===
2016 California State Assembly 1st district election
Primary election
Party	Candidate	Votes	%
Republican	Brian Dahle (incumbent)	103,500	99.6
Libertarian	Donn Coenen (write-in)	446	0.4
Total votes		103,946	100.0
General election
Republican	Brian Dahle (incumbent)	148,657	73.8
Libertarian	Donn Coenen	52,871	26.2
Total votes		201,528	100.0
Republican hold			

=== 2014 ===
2014 California State Assembly 1st district election
Primary election
Party	Candidate	Votes	%
Republican	Brian Dahle (incumbent)	65,466	69.5
Democratic	Brigham Sawyer Smith	28,688	30.5
Total votes		94,154	100.0
General election
Republican	Brian Dahle (incumbent)	104,103	70.2
Democratic	Brigham Sawyer Smith	44,119	29.8
Total votes		148,222	100.0
Republican hold			

=== 2012 ===
2012 California State Assembly 1st district election
Primary election
Party	Candidate	Votes	%
Republican	Brian Dahle	41,384	34.2
Republican	Rick Bosetti	34,457	28.5
Democratic	Robert Meacher	31,120	25.8
Green	David Edwards	7,381	6.1
Libertarian	Charley Hooper	6,503	5.4
Total votes		120,845	100.0
General election
Republican	Brian Dahle	116,098	65.6
Republican	Rick Bosetti	60,920	34.4
Total votes		177,018	100.0
Republican gain from Democratic			

=== 2010 ===
2010 California State Assembly 1st district election
Party	Candidate	Votes	%
Democratic	Wesley Chesbro (incumbent)	98,250	61.6
Republican	Karen Brooks	61,414	38.4
Total votes		159,664	100.0
Democratic hold			

=== 2008 ===
2008 California State Assembly 1st district election
Party	Candidate	Votes	%
Democratic	Wesley Chesbro	137,777	70.8
Republican	Jim Pell	56,870	29.2
Total votes		194,647	100.0
Democratic hold			

=== 2006 ===
2006 California State Assembly 1st district election
Party	Candidate	Votes	%
Democratic	Patty Berg (incumbent)	99,626	64.7
Republican	Ray Tyrone	47,196	30.7
Libertarian	Thomas Reed	7,011	4.6
Independent	Robert Parker (write-in)	51	0.0
Total votes		153,884	100.0
Democratic hold			

=== 2004 ===
2004 California State Assembly 1st district election
Party	Candidate	Votes	%
Democratic	Patty Berg (incumbent)	120,157	61.4
Republican	Ray Tyrone	64,587	33.0
Libertarian	Ken Anton	10,817	5.5
Total votes		195,561	100.0
Democratic hold			

=== 2002 ===
2002 California State Assembly 1st district election
Party	Candidate	Votes	%
Democratic	Patty Berg	64,065	48.6
Republican	Robert K. "Bob" Brown	52,659	39.9
Green	Doug Riley Thron	15,315	11.5
Total votes		132,039	100.0
Democratic hold			

=== 2000 ===
2000 California State Assembly 1st district election
Party	Candidate	Votes	%
Democratic	Virginia Strom-Martin (incumbent)	108,184	64.5
Republican	Michael Lampson	51,753	30.9
Libertarian	Joshua Gilleo	7,800	4.6
Total votes		167,737	100.0
Democratic hold			

=== 1998 ===
1998 California State Assembly 1st district election
Party	Candidate	Votes	%
Democratic	Virginia Strom-Martin (incumbent)	87,403	61.7
Republican	Sam Crump	47,662	33.7
Peace and Freedom	Pamela Elizondo	6,536	4.6
Total votes		141,602	100.0
Democratic hold			

=== 1996 ===
1996 California State Assembly 1st district election
Party	Candidate	Votes	%
Democratic	Virginia Strom-Martin	87,800	52.9
Republican	Margie Handley	69,917	42.1
Natural Law	Harry K. Wrench III	8,341	5.0
Total votes		166,058	100.0
Democratic hold			

=== 1994 ===
1994 California State Assembly 1st district election
Party	Candidate	Votes	%
Democratic	Dan Hauser (incumbent)	87,749	61.3
Republican	John Baird	48,148	33.6
Libertarian	Charles J. Harris	7,310	5.1
Total votes		143,207	100.0
Democratic hold			

=== 1992 ===
1992 California State Assembly 1st district election
Party	Candidate	Votes	%
Democratic	Dan Hauser (incumbent)	102,093	57.2
Republican	Anna L. Sparks	61,623	34.5
Green	Margene McGee	10,151	5.7
Peace and Freedom	Pamela Elizondo	4,643	2.6
Total votes		178,510	100.0
Democratic gain from Republican			

=== 1990 ===
1990 California State Assembly 1st district election
Party	Candidate	Votes	%
Republican	Stan Statham (incumbent)	68,755	56.5
Democratic	Arlie E. Candle	52,165	42.9
No party	Al Cunningham (write-in)	682	0.6
Total votes		121,602	100.0
Republican hold			

== See also ==
- California State Assembly
- California State Assembly districts
- Districts in California
