= A. Van Leuven =

American politician

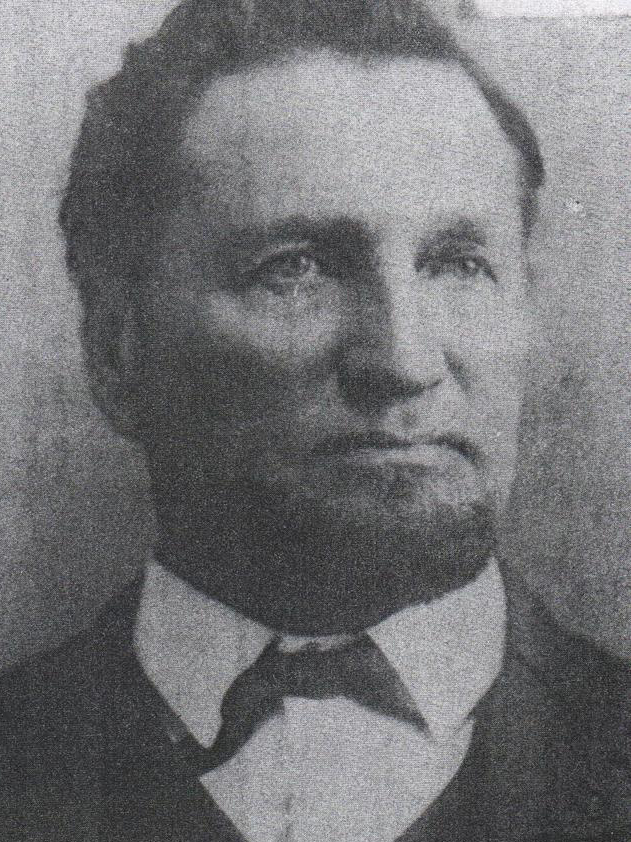

Member of the California State Assembly from the 1st district
- In office 1863 – December 4, 1865
- Preceded by: R. G. Allen
- Succeeded by: John W. Satterwhite

Personal details
- Born: October 26, 1829 Camden, Ontario, Canada
- Died: May 23, 1896 (aged 66) Redlands, California
- Party: National Union
- Spouse: Elizabeth Frances Ann Robinson (m. 1863)

Anson Lytle Van Leuven (October 16, 1829 – May 23, 1896) was an American politician who served as a member of the California State Assembly, representing California's 1st State Assembly district from 1863 to 1865. Before and after a brief stint in politics, Van Leuven was a successful orange producer in the San Bernardino area, with him planting the first orange groves in the area in 1853.

== Life and career ==
Van Leuven was born on October 16, 1829, in Camden, Ontario, Canada, moving with his family to Illinois and Missouri before arriving in San Bernardino, California, with his brother, Lewis, in 1853. With other members of their family arriving a year later, the family bought land and settled near Mill Creek Zanja. In 1857, Leuven bought orange seedling trees from William Wolfskill and started growing oranges. Because of the novelty surrounding oranges, he became a successful orange grower.

In 1860, Van Leuven became a sheriff of San Bernardino County and was the third to serve in that year, presiding over the various mining towns as well as the beginnings of the American Civil War. After two years, he became a U.S. Marshall and later a member of the California State Assembly. He retired in 1865 in order to focus on his orange trees. In December 1868, his home was burned down, so he built a two-story home in Redlands, now an apartment complex. He died in that home on May 23, 1896.
