= Senator Hoffman =

Senator Hoffman may refer to:

- Barbara A. Hoffman (1940–2021), Maryland State Senate
- Brent Hoffman (born 1963), South Dakota State Senate
- D. B. Hoffman (fl. 1860s), California State Senate
- Gene Lyle Hoffman (1912–1998), Iowa State Senate
- Gretchen Hoffman (born 1957), Minnesota State Senate
- Jake Hoffman (politician), Arizona State Senate
- John Hoffman (Minnesota politician) (born 1965), Minnesota State Senate
- Lyman Hoffman (born 1950), Alaska State Senate

== See also ==
- Nancy Larraine Hoffmann (born 1947), New York State Senate
