= George Tebbetts =

George Tebbetts may refer to:

- George P. Tebbetts (1828–1909), California politician
- Birdie Tebbetts (George Robert Tebbetts, 1912–1999), baseball player and figure
