= Benjamin Hayes =

Benjamin Hayes may refer to:

- Benjamin Ignatius Hayes (1815–1877), American pioneer
- Benjamin Francis Hayes (1830–1906), Free Will Baptist pastor, author and educator
- Benjamin Hayes (politician), California state assemblyman
- Benjamin Franklin Hayes (1836–1901), American judge, state representative, and state senator
