= J. J. Murphy =

J. J. Murphy may refer to:

- J. J. Murphy (politician)
- J. J. Murphy (actor)
