= James McCoy (politician) =

American politician (1821–1895)

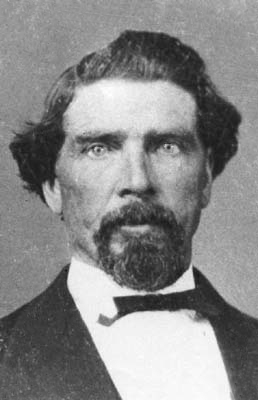

Member of the California Senate from the 1st district
- In office December 4, 1871 – December 6, 1875
- Preceded by: William Alexander Conn
- Succeeded by: John W. Satterwhite

Personal details
- Born: August 12, 1821 County Antrim, Ireland.
- Died: November 8, 1895 (aged 74) San Diego, California
- Resting place: Pioneer Park (San Diego); 32.7492°N 117.1776°W
- Party: Democratic

James McCoy (August 12, 1821 – November 8, 1895) was an American Democratic politician from California.

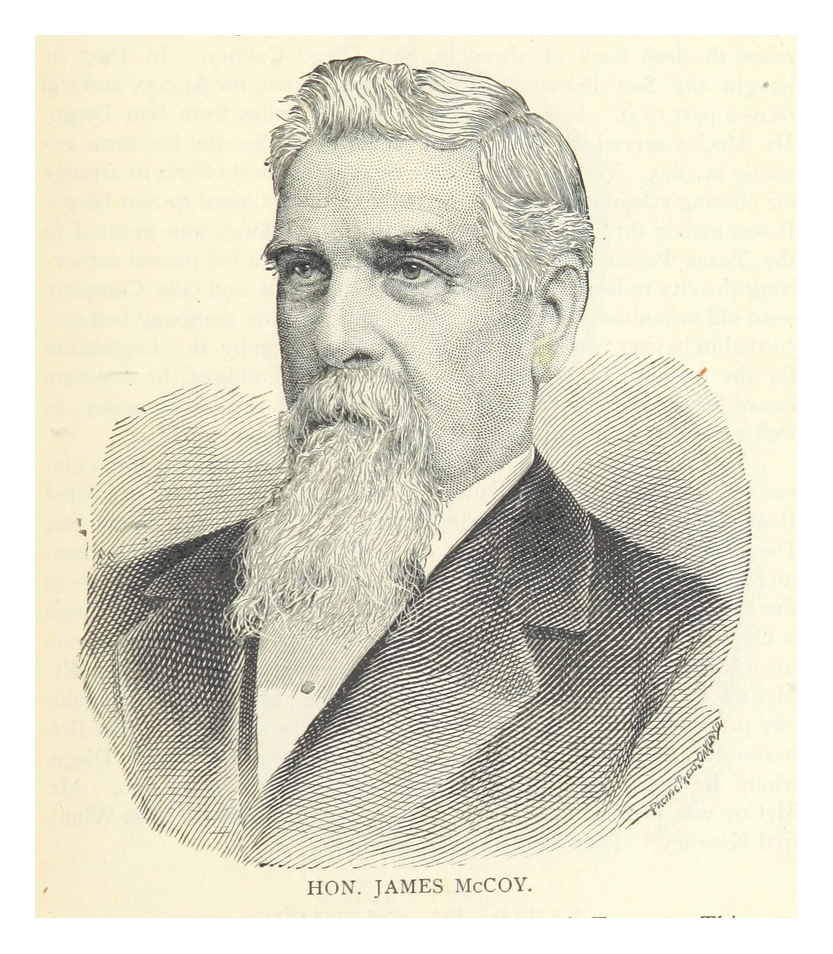
Image from page 153 of The City and County of San Diego. Illustrated, and containing biographical sketches

== Biography ==
McCoy was born 1821 in County Antrim, Ireland. He was a big, imposing man and came to the U.S. in 1842 and joined the Army in 1846, which was recruiting for the Mexican–American War. He came to San Diego in Summer of 1850 as part of the First U.S. Artillery (Magruder's Battery), as a non-commissioned officer. Sergeant McCoy and his troops helped protect the countryside during the war. After discharge in 1853, McCoy remained in San Diego.

McCoy worked odd jobs, surveying and carrying mail between Yuma and Tucson, Arizona.

In 1859 McCoy was elected Assessor of San Diego. He also started raising sheep near Cuyamaca.

McCoy was sheriff of San Diego County, California during 1862–1872. At the time the county stretched to the Colorado River. Charles Kelly described McCoy as "a big man over six feet tall who weighed 190 pounds [85 kilograms]. He could speak Spanish fluently. Everybody thought a great deal of him." Ephraim Morse said that during the time "there are only two men in San Diego that don't occasionally get drunk and they are James McCoy, the sheriff, and myself."

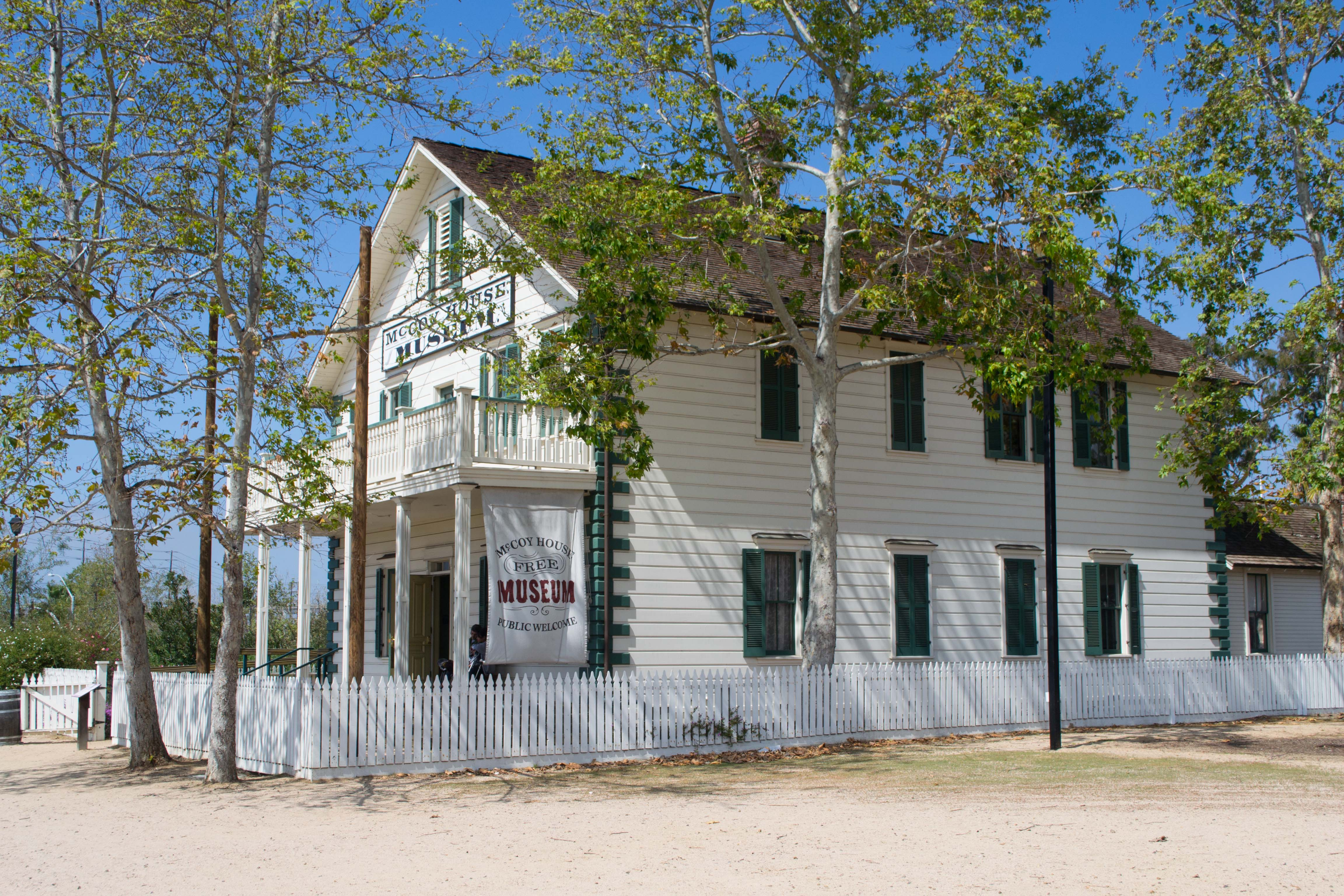
The James McCoy House at Old Town San Diego State Historic Park

McCoy married Winifred "Winnie" Kearney on April 27, 1869. They bought a newly built two-story house in Old Town San Diego. The house was renovated in 1898 to Victorian style. The house was reconstructed in 1999 and is open to the public. It is located across the street from the Old Town Transit Center.

McCoy was president of the San Diego's board of trustees during 1869–1871, when San Diego did not have a mayoral form of government. During 1871–1874 he served in the California State Senate. While senator he worked on getting a railroad to San Diego (with limited success), mail service, and land cessions to San Diego. In 1871, at the urging of San Diego developers, he quietly introduced a bill in the legislature to permit portions of Balboa Park to be sold to private parties. However, San Diego residents learned of the plan and rallied to preserve the park as a public trust.

In 1887, McCoy and others laid out the subdivision of Moreno, east of Mission Bay. Moreno was named for Felipe Morena, a minor character in the novel Ramona.

McCoy died in his home in 1895, and his wife died later. They had no children.

== Sources ==
- "James McCoy Lawman and Legislator", The Journal of San Diego History 23:4 (Fall 1977)
- Black, Samuel T. (1913). San Diego County California. The S. J. Clark Publishing Company, Chicago., v. 2, pp. 24–26: "James McCoy"
- Elliott, Wallace W. (1883). History of San Bernardino and San Diego Counties, California.. Reprinted 1956 by Riverside Museum Press. An engraged portrait (but no biography) is on p. 153.

| Preceded by George Lyons, 1858–1861 | Sheriff of San Diego County; 1862–1871 | Succeeded by Samuel W. Craigue, 1871–1874 |
| Preceded by José Guadalupe Estudillo | President of the San Diego Board of Trustees; 1869–1872 | Succeeded by William J. McCormick |
