= David Kurtz =

David Kurtz may refer to:

- David B. Kurtz, American politician from California
- David Kurtz (composer), American film score composer
