= Fenton M. Slaughter =

American businessman and politician

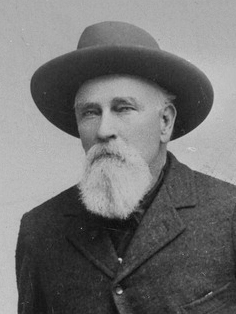

Member of the California Senate from the 1st district
- In office December 4, 1871 – December 1, 1873
- Preceded by: William N. Robinson
- Succeeded by: N. J. Pishon

Personal details
- Born: January 10, 1826 Charleston, Virginia
- Died: May 29, 1897 (aged 71)} San Gabriel Valley, California
- Party: Democratic

Fenton Mercer Eurice Slaughter (January 10, 1826 – May 29, 1897) was an American soldier, pioneer, gold miner, mechanical engineer, farmer and politician. After serving in the Mexican-American War, he spent most of the rest of his life in California, where he became a successful farmer and politician.

== Early life ==
Slaughter had Virginia ancestry going back to 1616. He was born in Charleston, Virginia (now West Virginia) to parents Robin Lewis Slaughter and the former Elizabeth Gillem. His father died in 1834 when he was eight years old, leaving his mother to raise 11 children. His mother moved the family to Callaway County, Missouri in 1835 and later settled in St. Louis. He worked on farms and attended common schools. He served an apprenticeship in mechanical engineering and later worked on steamboats operating between St. Louis and New Orleans.

== Military service ==
In 1846, Slaughter volunteered to fight in the Mexican–American War, serving in a Missouri regiment commanded by Colonel Sterling Price. Most of his service was in the present day State of New Mexico. He fought in the Taos Revolt and the Battle of Red River Canyon. During his service, he was captured by the Navajo people and held as a prisoner of war for 22 days. He escaped by riding 125 miles (201 km) to Albuquerque on a mule he took from the Navajo. He was later wounded in a skirmish with Native Americans in the Rio Grande Valley.

== Travels to California ==
After he was discharged from military service in Santa Fe in 1847, Slaughter returned to St. Louis until 1849, when he came to California by the overland route during the Gold Rush. He spent a year mining for gold in what is now El Dorado County, California and then returned to St. Louis by the sea route to Panama and New Orleans.

In 1851, he returned to the same area of California, where he worked as an engineer in the first steam-powered sawmill in the Sierra Nevada Mountains, and again mined for gold. He then moved on to Mariposa County, California in 1853, where he worked for Edward Fitzgerald Beale, California's first Superintendent of Indian Affairs.

== Settling in Southern California ==
In 1854, he moved to Los Angeles, working as an engineer. He soon obtained land in Los Angeles County and San Bernardino County, and began raising sheep with John A. Rowland. They were among the first to introduce Merino sheep to Southern California.

Slaughter worked as a miner, sheep farmer, and blacksmith. He became successful, particularly in the sheep business, and purchased a piece of quality grazing land in western San Bernardino County not far from Los Angeles from Raymondo Yorba, who was a member of a wealthy Californio family. The plot included the Yorba-Slaughter Adobe, a historic adobe house where Slaughter lived with his family until his death. His family home still stands, and is on the National Register of Historic Places. As a result of this land purchase he was able to "vastly increased his wealth and influence."

A community called Rincon grew around the adobe, which included a general store, a post office, a saloon, a blacksmith shop and a dairy. Slaughter established the Vine Slope winery by 1879 and built a larger winery in 1887. He had 40 acres of wine grapes in production by that time. He also had a herd of 50 thoroughbred cattle and was successful in raising race horses.

== Political offices ==
After moving to San Bernardino County, Slaughter entered politics as a member of the Democratic Party. Although his district was heavily Republican, he was popular with voters because he was a vigorous supporter of the Union cause during the Civil War. He was elected to the California State Assembly in 1870 to represent San Bernardino County and served in the 1871–73 session.

After his legislative service, Slaughter served as postmaster of Rincon, as a trustee on the local school board, and as a San Bernardino County Supervisor, initially appointed to the office after the death of his predecessor, and then elected to a new term by a large majority.

== Personal life ==
He married Dolores Alvarado from the San Gabriel Valley in 1860, and they had nine children.
