= Bieber, California =

- Unincorporated community Census-designated place
- Location of Bieber in Lassen County, California

- Location in California
- Coordinates: 41°07′17″N 121°08′39″W
- Country: United States
- State: California
- County: Lassen County

Area
  - Total: 3.51 sq mi (9.09 km^{2})
  - Land: 3.45 sq mi (8.94 km^{2})
  - Water: 0.058 sq mi (0.15 km^{2}) 0%
- Elevation: 4,124 ft (1,257 m)

Population (2020)
  - Total: 266
  - Density: 77.0/sq mi (29.74/km^{2})
- Time zone: UTC-8 (Pacific (PST))
  - Summer (DST): UTC-7 (PDT)
- ZIP Code: 96009
- Area codes: 530, 837
- GNIS feature ID: 253152; 2582944

Bieber (formerly Chalk Ford) is a census-designated place in Lassen County, California, United States. It is located on the Pit River, 55 miles (89 km) north-northwest of Susanville, at an elevation of 4,124 feet (1,257 m) Its population is 266 as of the 2020 census, down from 312 from the 2010 census. For statistical purposes, the United States Census Bureau has defined Bieber as a census-designated place (CDP). The ZIP Code is 96009. The community is inside area code 530.

== History ==
The settlement sprang up at the Pit River ford in 1877. The first post office at Bieber opened in 1877. It was named for Nathan Bieber, a local shopkeeper. It was a major junction between the Great Northern and Western Pacific railroads for north–south traffic, now owned by BNSF Railway.

== Demographics ==
Historical population
Census	Pop.	Note	%±
2010	312		—
2020	266		−14.7%
U.S. Decennial Census; 1850–1870 1880-1890; 1900 1910 1920; 1930 1940 1950; 1960 1970 1980; 1990 2000 2010

=== 2020 census ===
As of the 2020 census, Bieber had a population of 266. The population density was 77.0 inhabitants per square mile (29.7/km^{2}). The median age was 43.5 years. The age distribution was 19.5% under the age of 18, 9.4% aged 18 to 24, 22.9% aged 25 to 44, 27.8% aged 45 to 64, and 20.3% who were 65 years of age or older. For every 100 females there were 137.5 males, and for every 100 females age 18 and over there were 130.1 males age 18 and over.

0.0% of residents lived in urban areas, while 100.0% lived in rural areas.

There were 116 households in Bieber, of which 20.7% had children under the age of 18 living in them. Of all households, 50.0% were married-couple households, 3.4% were cohabiting couple households, 28.4% were households with a male householder and no spouse or partner present, and 18.1% were households with a female householder and no spouse or partner present. About 29.3% of all households were made up of individuals and 16.4% had someone living alone who was 65 years of age or older. The average household size was 2.29. There were 76 families (65.5% of all households).

There were 146 housing units at an average density of 42.3 units per square mile (16.3 units/km^{2}), of which 116 (79.5%) were occupied. Of the occupied units, 66.4% were owner-occupied and 33.6% were occupied by renters. Of all housing units, 20.5% were vacant. The homeowner vacancy rate was 1.3% and the rental vacancy rate was 9.3%.

Racial composition as of the 2020 census
Race	Number	Percent
White	210	78.9%
Black or African American	3	1.1%
American Indian and Alaska Native	2	0.8%
Asian	3	1.1%
Native Hawaiian and Other Pacific Islander	0	0.0%
Some other race	32	12.0%
Two or more races	16	6.0%
Hispanic or Latino (of any race)	53	19.9%

=== 2010 census ===
Bieber first appeared as a census designated place in the 2010 U.S. census.

== Politics ==
In the state legislature, Bieber is in the 1st senatorial district, represented by Republican Megan Dahle, and the 1st Assembly district, represented by Republican Heather Hadwick, Meghan Dahle succeeded her husband, Brian Dahle in both positions. Brian Dahle grew up in Bieber.

Federally, Bieber is in California's 1st congressional district, represented by Republican James Gallagher.
