= Robert W. Groom =

American politician

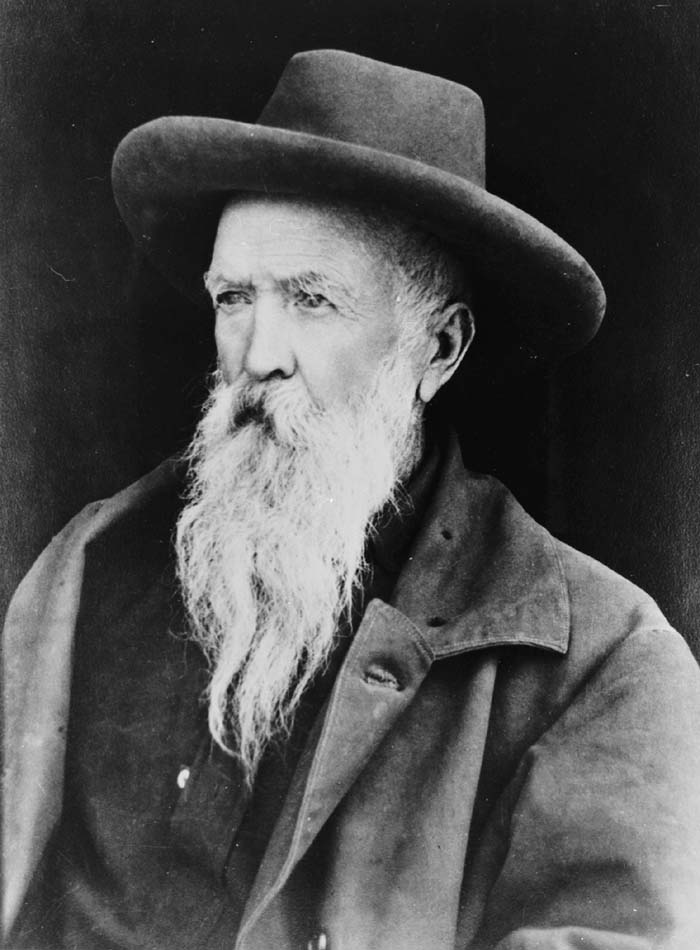

Member of the Arizona Territorial Legislature
- In office December 6, 1865 – January 5, 1866
- Preceded by: District established
- Succeeded by: Daniel S. Lount
- Constituency: Yavapai district
- In office September 26, 1864 – November 8, 1864
- Preceded by: District established
- Succeeded by: District eliminated
- Constituency: 3rd district

Member of the California State Assembly from the 1st district
- In office January 2, 1860 – January 7, 1861
- Preceded by: A. S. Ensworth
- Succeeded by: David B. Kurtz
- In office January 4, 1858 – January 3, 1859
- Preceded by: Jeptha J. Kendrick
- Succeeded by: A. S. Ensworth

Personal details
- Born: August 28, 1824 Clark County, Kentucky
- Died: January 21, 1899 (aged 74) Wickenburg, Arizona
- Party: Democratic

Robert W. Groom (August 28, 1824 – January 21, 1899) was an American surveyor and politician served as a member of the California State Assembly, representing California's 1st State Assembly district from 1858 to 1859 and 1860 to 1861. He was previously a miner, and used his surveying skills to help lay down the communities of Prescott and Wickenburg. The community of Groom Creek, Arizona, is named after him.

== Life and career ==
Groom was born on August 28, 1824, in Clark County, Kentucky, moving to Missouri with his parents when he was three years old. As an adult, he went back to Kentucky to become a surveyor, serving as the Deputy County Surveyor of Trigg County from 1845 to 1848. He later moved to California to become a miner, and became the San Diego County Surveyor from 1856 to 1859. In 1857, he was elected to the California State Assembly for the 1st district, later being re-elected for a second time in 1859. He stayed in California until the outbreak of the American Civil War, where he formed a party to go to Texas and join the Confederacy. He was captured and held in Ford Union for ten months before being released because of a letter from U.S. Senator James A. McDougall that stated his loyalty.

In 1863, he moved to the Arizona Territory and became a guide. While in Arizona, he became a mining prospector and surveyor, and was appointed by Governor John Noble Goodwin to lay down the streets of Prescott and later Wickenburg. He was then elected to the 1st and 2nd Territorial Legislatures for the 3rd district and the Yavapai district. He stayed in Wickenburg until his death on January 21, 1899.

Political offices
Preceded by Jeptha J. Kendrick	1st District, California State Assembly; 1858–1869	Succeeded by A. S. Ensworth
Preceded by A. S. Ensworth	1st District, California State Assembly; 1860–1861	Succeeded by David B. Kurtz
