= Brian Dahle =

American politician (born 1965)

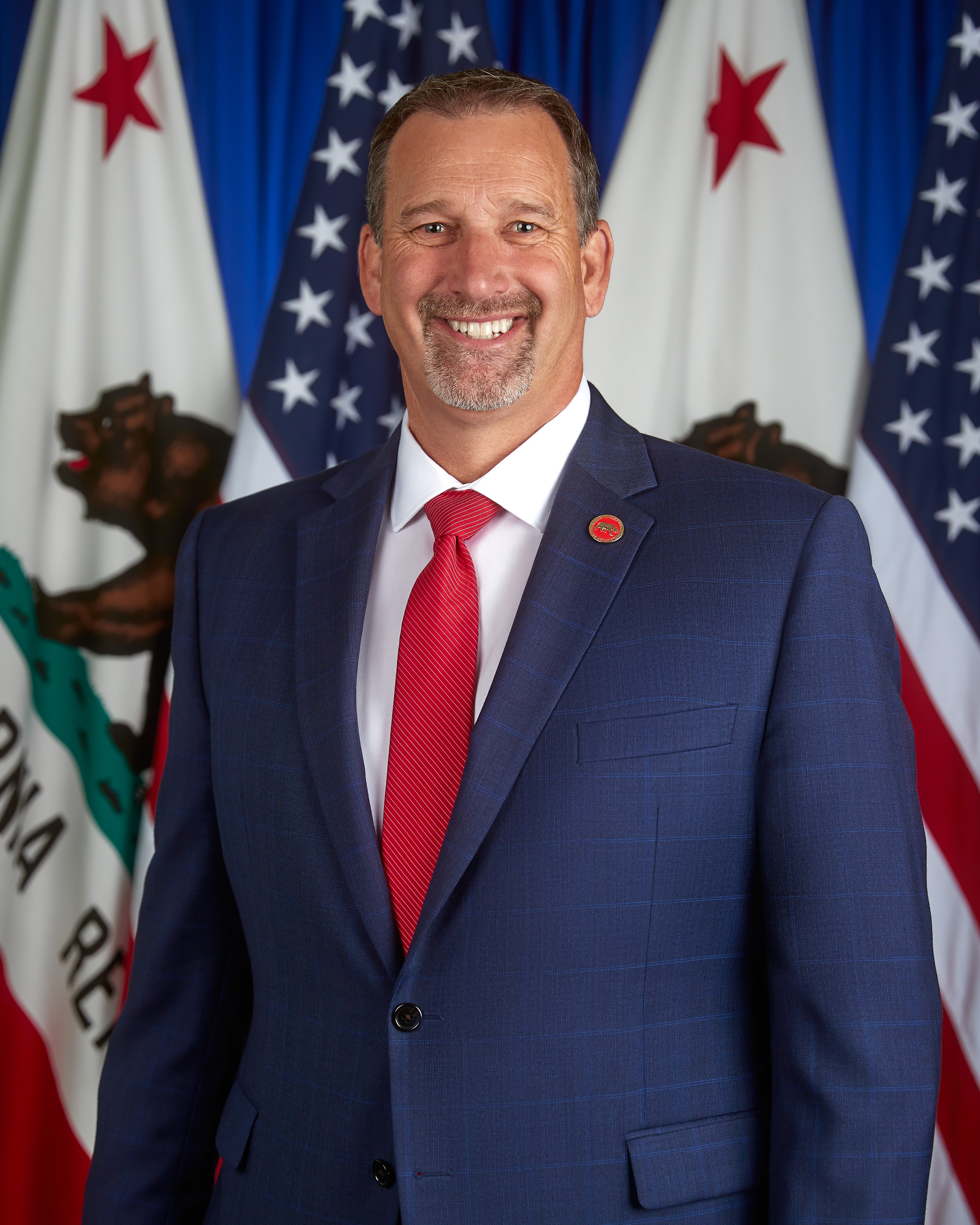
- Official portrait, c. 2023–2024

Member of the California State Senate from the 1st district
- In office June 12, 2019 – November 30, 2024
- Preceded by: Ted Gaines
- Succeeded by: Megan Dahle

Minority Leader of the California Assembly
- In office September 16, 2017 – November 8, 2018
- Preceded by: Chad Mayes
- Succeeded by: Marie Waldron

Member of the California State Assembly from the 1st district
- In office December 3, 2012 – June 12, 2019
- Preceded by: Jim Nielsen
- Succeeded by: Megan Dahle

Member of the Lassen County Board of Supervisors from the 4th district
- In office January 14, 1997 – November 27, 2012
- Preceded by: Gary Lemke
- Succeeded by: Aaron Albaugh

Personal details
- Born: Brian Dwain Dahle; September 20, 1965 (age 61) Redding, California, U.S.
- Party: Republican
- Spouse: Megan Ray (m. 1999)
- Children: 3
- Website: State Senate website; Campaign website

Brian Dwain Dahle (born September 20, 1965) is an American politician and farmer who served as a member of the California State Senate from the 1st district from 2019 to 2024. A member of the Republican Party, Dahle served as a member of the California State Assembly from the 1st district from 2012 to 2019, and as Assembly minority leader from 2017 to 2018. Before his election to the state legislature, Dahle served on the Lassen County Board of Supervisors from 1997 to 2012.

On June 4, 2019, Dahle won a special election to fill the State Senate seat vacated by Ted Gaines, who resigned after his election to the California State Board of Equalization. After Dahle joined the State Senate, his wife Megan Dahle was elected to his vacated Assembly seat.

Dahle was the Republican nominee for governor of California in 2022. He was defeated by incumbent Democrat Gavin Newsom.

== Early life and education ==
Descended from Tule Lake homesteaders and the son and grandson of farmers, Dahle was born in Redding and grew up in rural Lassen County. His grandfather was a World War I veteran who won his family farm in Bieber in a lottery during the Great Depression.

Dahle grew up poor with an alcoholic father and graduated from Big Valley High School in Bieber. Unable to afford college, he tried his hand at farming, but lost money in the attempt. To pay back debts, he took a job at a lumber mill, and later at hydroelectric plants. He also worked in construction for several years, including in a gold mine, and eventually began a seed business, which he owns to this day.

== Career ==
=== Lassen County Board of Supervisors ===
Dahle won his first election to the Lassen County Board of Supervisors in 1996, beating a popular teacher. He was reelected in 2000, 2004, and 2008. He represented District 4 on the board.

Dahle served one-year terms as chairman of the board in 1998, 2002, 2007, and 2012. He left his seat early on November 27, 2012, in order to take office in the Assembly the following week.

=== California State Assembly ===
Dahle was first elected to the California State Assembly for the 1st district with 65% of the vote in November 2012, and reelected in 2014, 2016, and 2018. He was appointed vice chair of the Assembly Environmental and Toxic Materials Committee, the Revenue and Taxation Committee, and the Natural Resources Committee. He also served as a member of the following committees: Agriculture; Water, Parks and Wildlife; Privacy and Consumer Protection; Utilities and Commerce; Fisheries and Aquaculture; Insurance; and Business and Professions.

In 2018, Assembly Speaker Anthony Rendon appointed Dahle to the Subcommittee on Sexual Harassment Prevention and Response, which works to improve services for Capitol staff. In the Assembly, Dahle was known for writing and passing a number of bipartisan bills under Governor Jerry Brown.

Dahle's Republican colleagues elected him minority leader on August 24, 2017. He served in that role from September 16, 2017, to November 8, 2018.

Dahle resigned from the Assembly on June 12, 2019, after winning a special election to the California State Senate. His wife Megan Dahle was elected to succeed him in the Assembly in a special election.

=== California State Senate ===
After Ted Gaines resigned, Dahle won a special election to replace him in the California State Senate and took office on June 12, 2019. He was elected to a full term in 2020 with 57.7% of the vote.

Dahle serves as vice chair of the Senate Energy, Utilities, and Communications Committee. He also serves on the following committees: Banking and Financial Institutions; Budget and Fiscal Review; Education; Environmental Quality; and Transportation.

==== Caucus memberships ====
- California Senate Republican Caucus
- Legislative Outdoor Sporting Caucus
- Legislative Rural Caucus

=== 2022 California gubernatorial election ===
Dahle was the Republican nominee for governor of California in the 2022 election. He placed second in the nonpartisan blanket primary, with 17.5% of the vote.

In September 2022, incumbent Democratic governor Gavin Newsom agreed to face off against Dahle in a single gubernatorial debate, sometime in late October. On October 23, Dahle and Newsom participated in a televised debate, hosted by KQED in San Francisco.

== Political positions ==
Dahle favors a suspension of the California gas tax to address high fuel prices, building more charging stations for electric vehicles, building the proposed Sites Reservoir project, and increasing oil production in California. He also supports rolling back parts of Proposition 47, but opposes jailing marijuana users. He has worked to stop medical patients from getting surprise medical bills from health care providers that are outside their insurance network. To reduce homelessness in California, Dahle supports building more affordable housing and tackling drug abuse. He has criticized Newsom's response to the COVID-19 pandemic and supports streamlining the path to obtaining U.S. citizenship.

Dahle has voted against bills intended to increase access to abortion and has said that abortion's legality will not change in California after the Dobbs v. Jackson Women's Health Organization ruling. He voted for a bill aimed at reducing the cost of contraceptives in California.

Dahle describes himself as a supporter of the Second Amendment. He has voted against SB 1327, legislation that allows private citizens to sue those who illegally sell assault weapons or .50 BMG rifles in California, but supports making it a felony to steal a firearm, and has voted for a bill that would make it easier to confiscate guns from convicted felons.

=== Controversies ===
In June 2022, Dahle placed the winning bid for a goat named Cedar at the Shasta District Fair auction. However, the goat's owners, including a 9-year-old girl, decided not to proceed with the sale. Dahle agreed to forgo the purchase and supported an alternative resolution, but Shasta District Fair officials pursued the matter and involved law enforcement, resulting in Cedar being seized and slaughtered, despite ongoing efforts by the owners to reach a different outcome. This incident later became the subject of a federal lawsuit. Fair officials tried to hide the identity of the bidder that bought the pet goat and had it slaughtered, but public records showed that the winning bid was placed by State Senator Dahle. The Senator relinquished ownership of the goat and did not have it slaughtered. However, the Shasta District Fair auction claimed ownership of the goat, leading the Shasta County Sheriff's Office to seize it and had it killed.

== Personal life ==
Dahle is married to Megan Dahle, who succeeded him in the Assembly and Senate. They have three children together.

== Electoral history ==
=== California State Assembly ===
==== 2012 ====
California State Assembly election, 2012
Primary election
Party	Candidate	Votes	%
Republican	Brian Dahle	41,384	34.2
Republican	Rick Bosetti	34,457	28.5
Democratic	Robert Meacher	31,120	25.8
Green	David Edwards	7,381	6.1
Libertarian	Charley Hooper	6,503	5.4
Total votes		120,845	100.0
General election
Republican	Brian Dahle	116,098	65.6
Republican	Rick Bosetti	60,920	34.4
Total votes		177,018	100.0
Republican hold			

==== 2014 ====
California's 1st State Assembly district election, 2014
Primary election
Party	Candidate	Votes	%
Republican	Brian Dahle (incumbent)	65,466	69.5
Democratic	Brigham Sawyer Smith	28,688	30.5
Total votes		94,154	100.0
General election
Republican	Brian Dahle (incumbent)	104,103	70.2
Democratic	Brigham Sawyer Smith	44,119	29.8
Total votes		148,222	100.0
Republican hold			

==== 2016 ====
California's 1st State Assembly district election, 2016
Primary election
Party	Candidate	Votes	%
Republican	Brian Dahle (incumbent)	103,500	99.6
Libertarian	Donn Coenen (write-in)	446	0.4
Total votes		103,946	100.0
General election
Republican	Brian Dahle (incumbent)	148,657	73.8
Libertarian	Donn Coenen	52,871	26.2
Total votes		201,528	100.0
Republican hold			

==== 2018 ====
California's 1st State Assembly district election, 2018
Primary election
Party	Candidate	Votes	%
Republican	Brian Dahle (incumbent)	82,916	64.1
Democratic	Caleen Sisk	30,902	23.9
Democratic	Peter Van Peborgh	11,446	8.9
No party preference	Jenny O'Connell-Nowain	3,987	3.1
No party preference	Jerome B.C. Venus (write-in)	9	0.0
Total votes		129,260	100.0
General election
Republican	Brian Dahle (incumbent)	125,227	63.0
Democratic	Caleen Sisk	73,449	37.0
Total votes		198,676	100.0
Republican hold			

=== California State Senate ===
==== 2019 (special) ====
2019 California's 1st State Senate district special election Vacancy resulting from the resignation of Ted Gaines
Primary election
Party	Candidate	Votes	%
Republican	Brian Dahle	57,725	29.6
Republican	Kevin Kiley	54,290	27.9
Democratic	Silke Pflueger	49,164	25.2
Republican	Rex Hime	18,050	9.3
Democratic	Steve Baird	10,855	5.6
Republican	Theodore Dziuba	4,672	2.4
Total votes		194,756	100.0
General election
Republican	Brian Dahle	70,556	53.1
Republican	Kevin Kiley	62,259	46.9
Total votes		132,815	100.0
Republican hold			

=== California Governor ===
==== 2022 ====
2022 California Gubernatorial Primary results
Party	Candidate	Votes	%
Democratic	Gavin Newsom (incumbent)	3,945,728	55.9
Republican	Brian Dahle	1,252,800	17.7
No party preference	Michael Shellenberger	290,286	4.1
Republican	Jenny Rae Le Roux	246,665	3.5
Republican	Anthony Trimino	246,322	3.5
Republican	Shawn Collins	173,083	2.5
Green	Luis J. Rodriguez	124,672	1.8
Republican	Leo S. Zacky	94,521	1.3
Republican	Major Williams	92,580	1.3
Republican	Robert C. Newman II	82,849	1.2
Democratic	Joel Ventresca	66,885	0.9
Republican	David Lozano	66,542	0.9
Republican	Ronald A. Anderson	53,554	0.8
No party preference	Reinette Senum	53,015	0.8
Democratic	Armando Perez-Serrato	45,474	0.6
Republican	Ron Jones	38,337	0.5
Republican	Daniel R. Mercuri	36,396	0.5
Green	Heather Collins	29,690	0.4
Democratic	Anthony Fanara	25,086	0.4
Republican	Cristian Raul Morales	22,304	0.3
Republican	Lonnie Sortor	21,044	0.3
No party preference	Frederic C. Schultz	17,502	0.2
No party preference	Woodrow Sanders III	16,204	0.2
No party preference	James G. Hanink	10,110	0.1
No party preference	Serge Fiankan	6,201	0.1
No party preference	Bradley Zink	5,997	0.1
American Independent	Jeff Scott (write-in)	13	0.0
Republican	Gurinder Bhangoo (write-in)	8	0.0
Total votes		7,063,868	100.0

2022 California gubernatorial election
Party	Candidate	Votes	%	±%
Democratic	Gavin Newsom (incumbent)	6,470,104	59.18%	−2.77
Republican	Brian Dahle	4,462,914	40.82%	+2.77
Total votes		10,933,018	100.00%	N/A
Turnout		10,933,018	50.80%	−12.48
Registered electors		21,940,274		

California Assembly
Preceded by Chad Mayes	Minority Leader of the California Assembly; 2017–2018	Succeeded by Marie Waldron
Party political offices
Preceded by John H. Cox	Republican nominee for Governor of California; 2022	Succeeded by Steve Hilton
