= G. N. Whitman =

American politician

G. N. Whitman was a United States politician. Whitman served as a member of the 1859 California State Assembly, representing the 1st District.

Preceded by A. S. Ensworth	1st District, California State Assembly; 1859-1860	Succeeded by William Alexander Conn
