= Dan Hauser =

American politician

Dan E. Hauser

Member of the California State Assembly
- In office December 6, 1982 – November 30, 1996
- Preceded by: Douglas Bosco
- Succeeded by: Virginia Strom-Martin
- Constituency: 2nd district (1982–1992); 1st district (1992–1996)

Personal details
- Born: June 18, 1942 (age 84) Riverside, California
- Party: Democratic
- Spouse: Donna Hauser
- Children: 2
- Education: Humboldt State University

Daniel E. Hauser (born June 18, 1942) is an American politician who served in the California State Assembly from 1982 until 1996. After graduating from Humboldt State University, Hauser served two terms on the Arcata City Council from 1974 to 1982. He served as Mayor of Arcata, California from 1978 to 1982.

== Career ==
Hauser represented California's 2nd State Assembly district from 1982 until 1992. The 2nd district included most of the state's North Coast region, including Del Norte, Humboldt and Mendocino counties as well as part of Sonoma County; however, the borders were redrawn after the 1990 census, and it was re-numbered as the 1st District. Hauser's legislative papers are available at the California State Archives.

He chaired the Committee on Housing and Community Development for 9 years, and introduced 306 pieces of legislation later signed into law. Hauser authored Assembly Bill 522 which, after being signed by into law by governor Pete Wilson, became the first American law to attempt to protect white sharks, and the bill which prevented oil drilling along the shore of his district, which was later extended to the entire state.

After the legislature, Hauser was executive director of the North Coast Railroad Authority, General Manager of the Northwestern Pacific Railroad and City Manager of Arcata.

California Assembly
Preceded by Douglas Bosco	California State Assemblyman, 2nd District; 1982–1992	Succeeded by Stan Statham
Preceded by Stan Statham	California State Assemblyman, 1st District; 1992–1996	Succeeded by Virginia Strom-Martin
