= Virginia Strom-Martin =

American politician from California

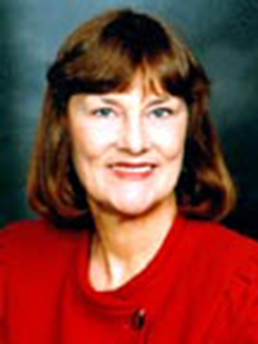

Member of the California State Assembly from the 1st district
- In office December 2, 1996 – November 30, 2002
- Preceded by: Dan Hauser
- Succeeded by: Patty Berg

Personal details
- Born: March 29, 1948 (age 78)
- Party: Democratic
- Spouse: Donald Martin
- Children: 2
- Education: University of California, Berkeley; Sonoma State University

Virginia Strom-Martin (born March 29, 1948) served in the California state Assembly from 1996 until she was termed out in 2002. She has been a member of the Unemployment Insurance Appeals Board since February 5, 2003. She was appointed by former Assembly Speaker Herb Wesson.

== Early life and education ==
Virginia Strom was born on 29 March 1948. She graduated from Petaluma High School in 1966. She graduated from the University of California, Berkeley with a Bachelor of Arts degree in art and a minor in psychology. She earned her Elementary Teaching Credential from Sonoma State University and in 1976, earned her Master of Arts degree in Counseling from the same university.

== Career ==
=== Teaching career ===
Strom-Martin was a teacher at Wright Elementary School in Santa Rosa from 1972 until 1996. In 1994, she received, along with five of her colleagues, the Jack London Excellence in Education Award from Sonoma State University for their restructuring efforts and creative classroom curriculum. In 1993, she was selected as one of 75 educators nationwide to participate in the first "China Breakers" Conference on Education, sponsored by RJR Nabisco, in Leesburg, VA.

=== Legislative career ===
In 1996, Strom-Martin ran for office as a Democratic candidate, and earned a position as a member of the California State Assembly from the 1st district. During her three terms, Strom-Martin chaired the following the Assembly Education Committee; the Joint Legislative Committee on Fisheries and Aquaculture; the Select Committee on Rural Economic Development; and Budget Subcommittee 3, Resources. In addition, she was Vice Chair of the Joint Committee to Develop a Master Plan for Education, Kindergarten-Higher Education, and Vice Chair of the School Bond Conference Committee. During 2001, she also chaired the Legislative Women's Caucus. During her legislative service, she was a member of numerous committees, task forces, and caucuses.

== Recognition ==
The California Society of Pediatric Dentists recognized Strom-Martin for her outstanding contributions and service to the children of California in 2001 and the Primary Care Association recognized her for her efforts on behalf of rural health clinics. In 2000 she received the PAWPAC award, which recognized her work on behalf of animals.

In 1999, Strom-Martin was given the Land Conservation Achievement Award by the prestigious Trust for Public Land. She was honored with the Upstream Swimmer Award (for environmental service in the face of adversity) from the Sonoma County Conservation Action and was honored by the Sonoma County Environmental Council and the Friends of the Russian River for fisheries advocacy.

The Town Council of Fairfax honored her in the fall of 2002 for her stellar legislative record on the environment and human and civil rights issues.

== Personal life ==
Strom-Martin lives on the Russian River in the town of Duncans Mills along with her husband, Donald Martin, and their two daughters.

California Assembly
Preceded by Dan Hauser	California State Assemblywoman, 1st District; December 2, 1996 – December 2, 2002	Succeeded by Patty Berg
