= Jeptha J. Kendrick =

American politician

Jeptha J. Kendrick (1811? - ) was an American politician. He was born in Kentucky. His father, Joseph Kendrick, was born in Virginia. He served as a member of the 1863-1865 California State Assembly, representing California's 1st State Senate district. He represented the 13th district in 1851-1852 and the 1st district from 1856 to 1858.

== Bibliography ==
- Leaves of a Stunted Shrub: A Genealogy of the Scrogin-Scroggin, Volume 6. Pg. 299.
- The Journal of the Senate During the ... Session of the ..., Volume 2
- Journals of the Legislature of the State of California, Volumes 1–2

Political offices
Preceded by William C. Ferrell	1st District, California State Assembly; 1856—1857	Succeeded by Robert W. Groom
Preceded by D. B. Hoffman	1st District, California State Assembly; 1863—1864	Succeeded by David B. Kurtz
