= R. G. Allen =

American politician (1833-1886)

County Commissioner of Boise County, Idaho Territory
- In office 1875–1877
- Constituency: Boise County

Member of the Idaho Territorial House of Representatives
- In office 1868–1871
- Constituency: Boise County

Member of the California State Assembly from the 1st district
- In office 1863–1863

Personal details
- Born: 1833 Virginia
- Died: March 4, 1886 Quartzburg, Idaho Territory
- Party: Democratic

Richard G. Allen (1833 – March 4, 1886) was an American politician in California and the Idaho Territory.

Allen was born in Virginia in 1833. In 1860, he was chosen to represent San Bernardino County on the California Democratic State Central Committee. He served as a member of the California State Assembly in 1863, representing the 1st State Senatorial district. He then moved to Boise County, Idaho Territory, and was elected as a Democrat to the territorial house of representatives in 1868 and 1870. He then served as county commissioner for Boise County from 1875 to 1877. Allen then lost elections for territorial council in 1878 and treasurer of Ada County in 1882.

Allen was a merchant in Quartzburg, Idaho Territory, and served as postmaster and agent of Wells Fargo in that town. He died there on March 4, 1886, from chronic bronchitis, and was buried at Placerville.
