= Henry Suverkrup =

American politician

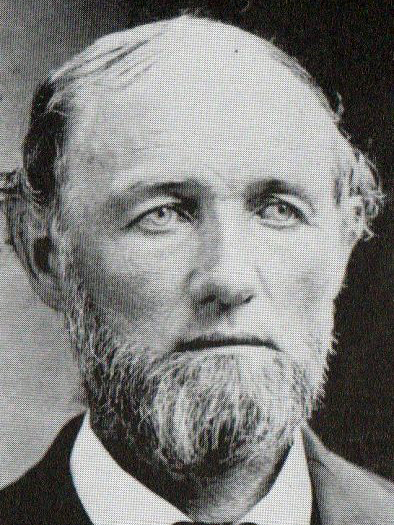

Member of the California State Assembly from the 1st district
- In office December 6, 1875 – December 3, 1877 Serving with James M. Pierce
- Preceded by: N. J. Pishon
- Succeeded by: Byron Waters

Personal details
- Born: 1824 Denmark
- Died: November 14, 1877 (aged 52–53) San Bernardino, California
- Party: Independent
- Spouse: Caroline Suverkrup

Henry Suverkrup (1824 – November 14, 1877) was a Denmark-born American politician who served in the California State Assembly and in the San Bernardino County Board of Supervisors.

== Early life ==
Suverkrup was born in 1924 in Denmark and immigrated to America, becoming a naturalized citizen in Cincinnati, Ohio, on October 23,1832. Although no record exists about when he moved to San Bernardino, he was listed in an 1860 census in the city. Suverkrup first started his career as a brewer, working with enterpriser Rudolph Hoffman, who was a German immigrant. After Hoffman died in 1871, Suverkup sold the brewery to Nathaniel J. Pishon, who he would later succeed as Assemblyman.

== Career ==
In 1864, Suverkrup was elected to the San Bernardino County Board of Supervisors, serving until 1867. He was re-elected to the San Bernardino County Board of Supervisors in 1871 and served again until 1873. In 1875, Suverkrup was elected to the California State Assembly for the 1st district alongside Republican James M. Pierce; they served together for one term.

== Personal life ==
He died on November 14, 1877, in his home in San Bernardino.
