= John M. James =

American politician

John M. James served as a member of the 1867–1869 California State Assembly, representing California's 1st State Assembly district.
