= Megan Dahle =

American politician from California

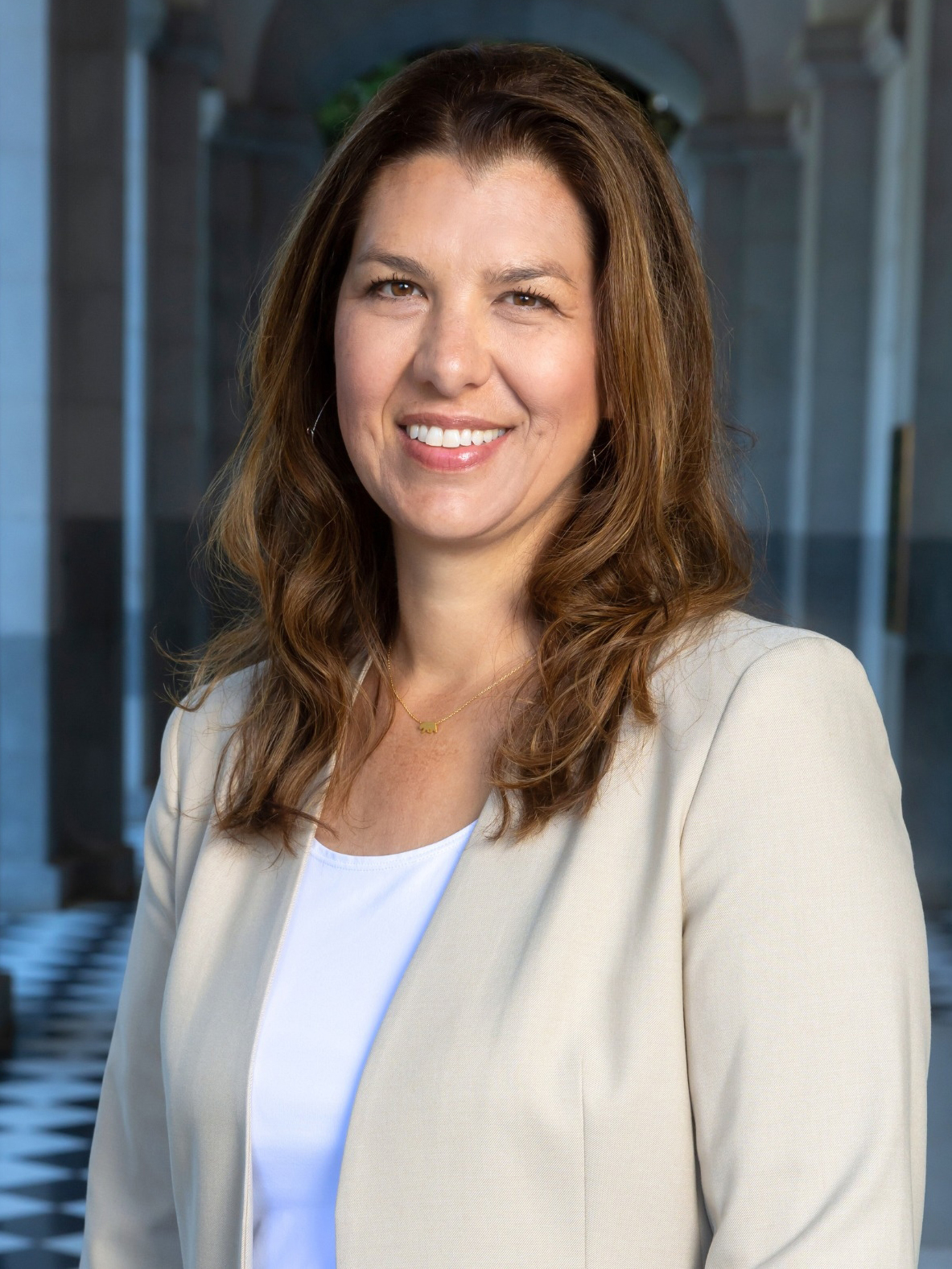
- Official portrait, 2024

Member of the California Senate from the 1st district
- Incumbent
- Assumed office December 2, 2024
- Preceded by: Brian Dahle

Member of the California State Assembly from the 1st district
- In office November 12, 2019 – November 30, 2024
- Preceded by: Brian Dahle
- Succeeded by: Heather Hadwick

Personal details
- Born: Megan Marie Ray; July 29, 1975 (age 50) Fall River Mills, California, U.S.
- Party: Republican
- Spouse: Brian Dahle (m. 1999)
- Children: 3
- Profession: Farmer

Megan Marie Dahle (née Ray; born July 29, 1975) is an American politician serving as a member of the California State Senate since 2024. A Republican, she represents the 1st State Senate district, which encompasses all of Butte, Colusa, Glenn, Lassen, Modoc, Plumas, Shasta, Sierra, Siskiyou, Sutter, Tehama and Yuba counties, as well as portions of Nevada and Placer counties. The district spans northeastern California, including the northern Sierra Nevada region and the Sacramento Valley. She previously served as a member of the California State Assembly from 2019 to 2024, representing the 1st district.

== Career ==
=== California State Senate ===
Senator Dahle serves on the following committees:

- Appropriations
- Energy, Utilities and Communications
- Environmental Quality
- Governmental Organization
- Transportation
- Joint Committee on Fairs Allocation and Classification
- Joint Legislative Audit Committee
- Joint Legislative Committee on Emergency Management

She also serves as the Senate's representative to the Sierra Nevada Conservancy.

=== California State Assembly ===
In 2019, her husband, Brian, won a special election for a seat in the California State Senate, leaving his State Assembly seat vacant. Dahle won a special election to fill that vacant Assembly seat, defeating Democratic candidate Elizabeth Betancourt, a farmer. She was re-elected in 2020 and 2022.

== Personal life ==
Prior to being elected to the State Assembly, she served on the Big Valley Joint Unified School District. Her family owned a wheat farm and she previously owned a plant nursery in Bieber.

Dahle and her husband have three children.

== Electoral history ==
=== 2019 (special) ===
2019 California State Assembly 1st district special election
Primary election
Party	Candidate	Votes	%
Democratic	Elizabeth Betancourt	27,786	39.1
Republican	Megan Dahle	25,669	36.2
Republican	Patrick Henry Jones	12,298	17.3
Republican	Joe Turner	3,943	5.6
Republican	Lane Rickard	1,305	1.8
Total votes		71,001	100.0
General election
Republican	Megan Dahle	59,991	57.3
Democratic	Elizabeth Betancourt	44,618	42.7
Total votes		104,609	100.0
Republican hold			

=== 2020 ===
2020 California State Assembly 1st district election
Primary election
Party	Candidate	Votes	%
Republican	Megan Dahle (incumbent)	83,874	51.0
Democratic	Elizabeth L. Betancourt	64,932	39.5
No party preference	PK "Paul" Dhanuka	15,629	9.5
Total votes		164,435	100.0
General election
Republican	Megan Dahle (incumbent)	146,902	58.9
Democratic	Elizabeth L. Betancourt	102,541	41.1
Total votes		249,443	100.0
Republican hold			

=== 2022 ===
2022 California State Assembly 1st district election
Primary election
Party	Candidate	Votes	%
Republican	Megan Dahle (incumbent)	79,201	52.5
Democratic	Belle Starr Sandwith	51,237	34.0
Republican	Kelly Tanner	17,577	11.6
Peace and Freedom	Joshua Brown	2,898	1.9
Total votes		150,913	100.0
General election
Republican	Megan Dahle (incumbent)	129,527	62.1
Democratic	Belle Starr Sandwith	79,068	37.9
Total votes		208,595	100.0
Republican hold			

=== 2024 ===
2024 California State Senate 1st district election
Primary election
Party	Candidate	Votes	%
Republican	Megan Dahle	154,305	77.2
Republican	David Fennell	45,686	22.8
Total votes		199,991	100.0
General election
Republican	Megan Dahle	274,894	75.7
Republican	David Fennell	88,317	24.3
Total votes		363,211	100.0
Republican hold			
