= Patty Berg (politician) =

American politician from California (1942–2024)

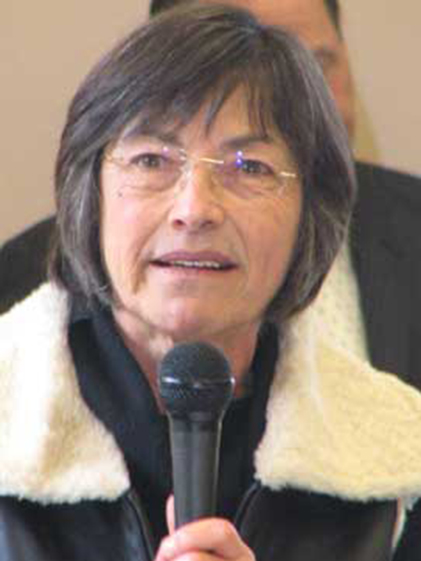
- Berg in 2005

Member of the California State Assembly from the 1st district
- In office December 2, 2002 – November 30, 2008
- Preceded by: Virginia Strom-Martin
- Succeeded by: Wesley Chesbro

Personal details
- Born: June 6, 1942 Seattle, Washington, U.S.
- Died: November 19, 2024 (aged 82)
- Party: Democratic

Patty Berg (June 6, 1942 – November 19, 2024) was an American politician who served in the California State Assembly from 2002 to 2008. A Democrat, she was elected in November 2002 to represent the 1st Assembly District, which includes Del Norte County, Humboldt County, Mendocino County, Lake County, and Trinity County as well as parts of Sonoma County.

== Early life ==
Berg was born in Seattle, and graduated from California State University at Los Angeles with a bachelor's degree in Sociology & Social Welfare in 1967. She has lived in Humboldt County since the 1970s. Her husband died in 1987.

== Local politics ==
Berg founded the Executive Director of the Area Agency on Aging serving Humboldt and Del Norte Counties for 19 years. While there, she grew the agency from a staff of 4 and a budget of $300,000 to 25 employees and a multimillion-dollar budget. Berg was a regional leader advocating for policy change in Sacramento and Washington, DC on issues related to aging.

In 1993, she wrote the Humboldt County Crime Prevention Plan and chaired its first Crime Commission. Berg then worked in partnership with law enforcement taking a number of steps to make local citizens safer.

Berg had a history as an advocate for women's rights and a woman's right to choose. In 1982, she helped found "CHOICES" Humboldt County's first pro-choice Political Action Committee. She also developed California's first K-12 comprehensive family life education curriculum in 1980, which was implemented in 80% of Humboldt County School Districts. Patty designed and taught a course through Humboldt State University to teachers and parents who adopted the curriculum. The training module was published and distributed nationally.

Berg retired from the Area Agency on Aging in 1999 and later that year, ran the campaign preventing Wal-Mart from building on the coast.

== State Assembly ==
She served as Chair of the Assembly Committee on Aging and Long Term Care as well as Chair of the Joint Committee on Fisheries and Aquaculture.

== Post-Assembly career ==
Berg filed a statement of intent to run for California Insurance Commissioner in 2010. Two other Democrats who has filed paperwork are Assemblymember Dave Jones from Sacramento and Assemblymember Hector De La Torre from South Gate. Berg died November 19, 2024, at the age of 82.

California Assembly
Preceded by Virginia Strom-Martin	California State Assemblymember, 1st District; December 2, 2002 – December 1, 2008	Succeeded by Wes Chesbro
