= William Alexander Conn =

American politician

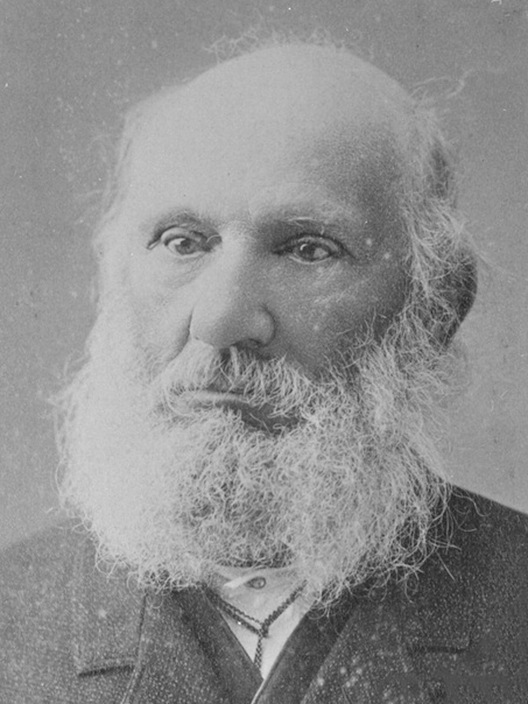
- Conn in 1870

Member of the California Senate from the 1st district
- In office December 4, 1865 – December 6, 1869
- Preceded by: M. C. Tuttle
- Succeeded by: James McCoy

Member of the California State Assembly from the 1st district
- In office January 2, 1860 – January 7, 1861
- Preceded by: G. N. Whitman
- Succeeded by: Abel Stearns

Personal details
- Born: 1814 Saint Thomas, Danish West Indies
- Died: January 4, 1903 (aged 88–89) San Bernardino, California
- Party: Democratic

William Alexander Conn (1814– January 4, 1903) was an American businessman, landowner and politician, serving as a member of the California State Assembly and as a Californian State Senator.

== Early life ==
Conn was born in the West Indies in 1814, the son of a businessman and landowner. His family emigrated to the United States four years later, settling first in Baltimore, followed by a series of moves that culminated in Conn's father buying a farm near Chester, Illinois. Two years after the death of his father in 1826, Conn and his family moved to Jacksonville, Illinois.

== Business career ==
Building a successful career in meat packing and shipping in Illinois, Conn began shipping supplies to San Francisco following the California Gold Rush and moved to the city in 1851. In 1857 he moved to San Bernardino and purchased 8000 acres of the Rancho San Bernardino from the Mormon settlers, many of whom were returning to Utah. Conn resold the land to new settlers, actively encouraging settlement of the area.

== Political career ==
Conn was elected to the California State Assembly in 1858, serving there for the 1858-59 sessions and was elected to the California Senate in 1867, serving until 1871.

Preceded by G. N. Whitman	1st District, California State Assembly; 1860–1861	Succeeded by Abel Stearns
