= Yorba–Slaughter Adobe =

Historic house in California, United States

- U.S. National Register of Historic Places
- California Historical Landmark
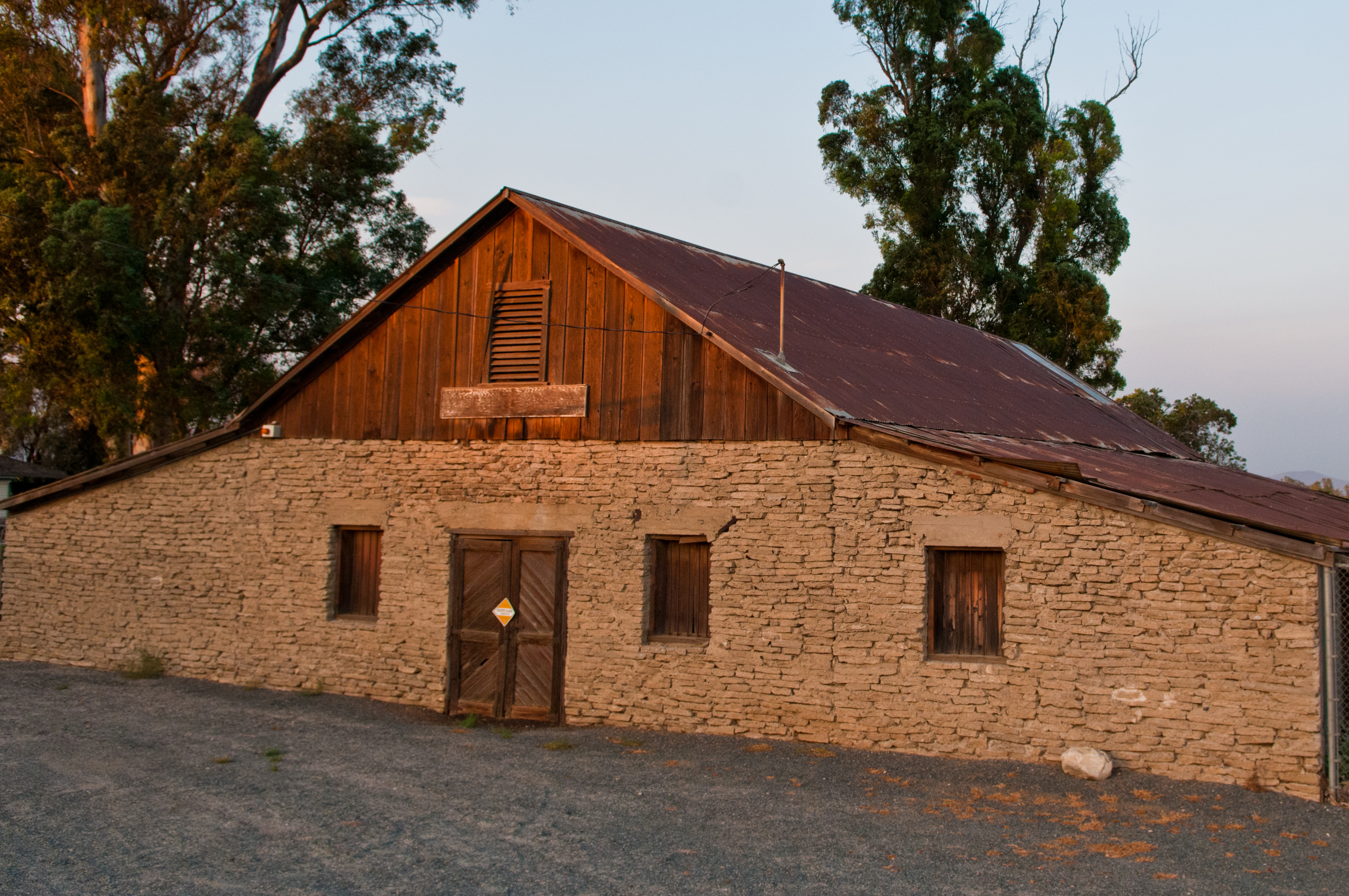

- Location within California Location within the United States
- Location: 17127 Pomona Rincon Rd., Chino, California
- Coordinates: 33°56′26″N 117°39′52″W
- Area: 1.1 acres (0.45 ha)
- Built: 1850
- NRHP reference No.: 75000460
- CHISL No.: 191

Significant dates
- Added to NRHP: July 7, 1975
- Designated CHISL: June 20, 1935

The Yorba–Slaughter Adobe is a historic adobe house located at 17127 Pomona Rincon Road near Chino, California. Built in the early 1850s, the adobe is typical of the building style prevalent during and around California's period of Mexican governance. Raimundo Yorba built the adobe on land thought to be part of Rancho El Rincon, a land grant owned by his father, Bernardo Yorba; however, a later survey determined the adobe was not part of the rancho. The younger Yorba lived in the adobe until 1868, when Forty-Niner and Mexican–American War veteran Fenton M. Slaughter bought the house. Slaughter, who later served in the California State Assembly, lived in the house until his 1897 death.

Slaughter's daughter, Julia Slaughter Fuqua, began rehabilitating the adobe in 1928. The adobe was designated a California Historical Landmark on June 20, 1935. It was added to the National Register of Historic Places on July 7, 1975.

The adobe now functions as a branch museum of the San Bernardino County Museum and includes an 1890s period general store.

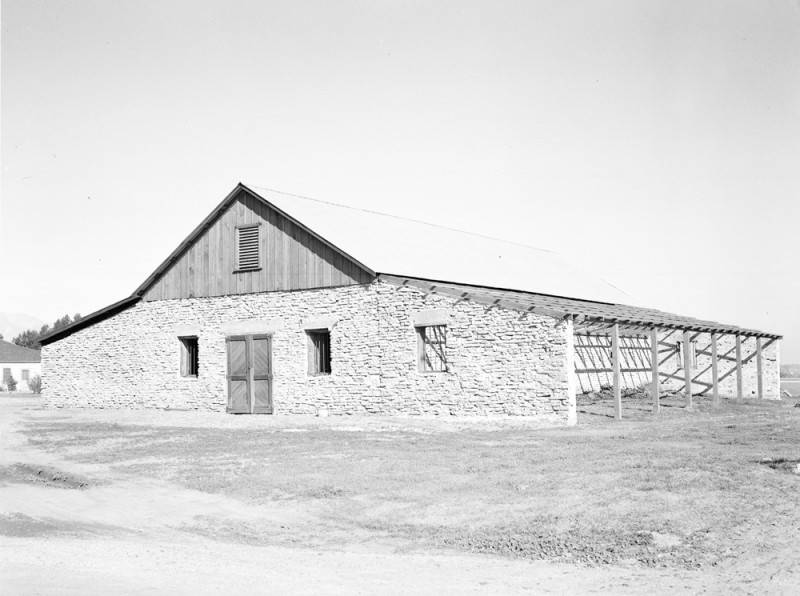
January, 1937

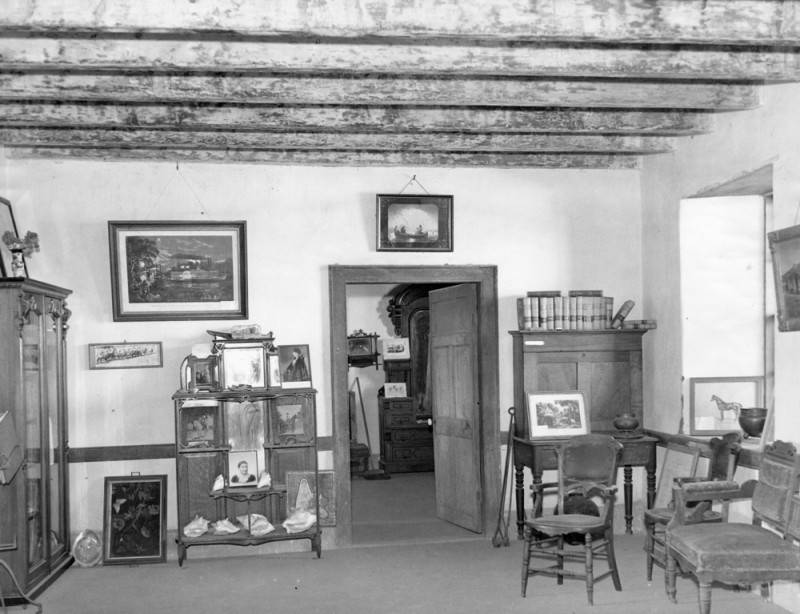
Interior, c. 1936

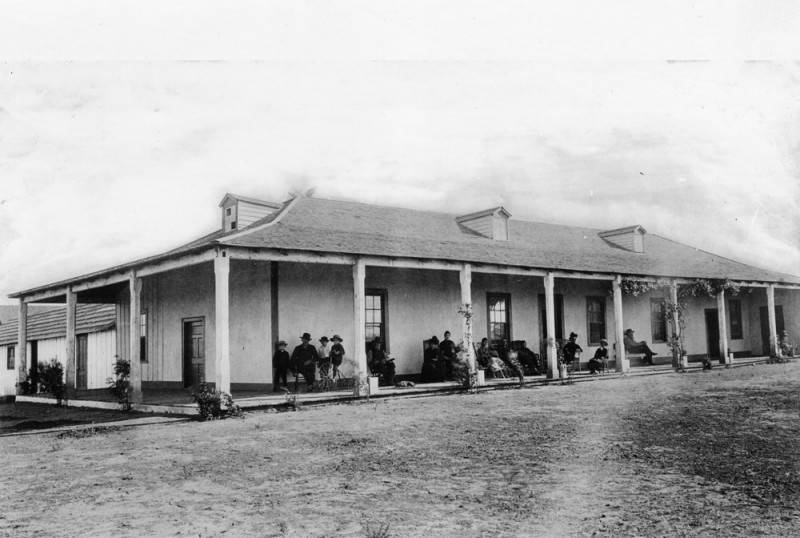
c. 1875
