= Benjamin Hayes (politician) =

American politician

Benjamin Hayes served as a member of the California State Assembly, representing California's 1st State Assembly district, from 1867–1868.

Political offices
Preceded by George A. Johnson	1st District, California State Assembly; 1867–1868	Succeeded by William N. Robinson
