= George P. Tebbetts =

3rd Mayor of San Diego (1828–1909)

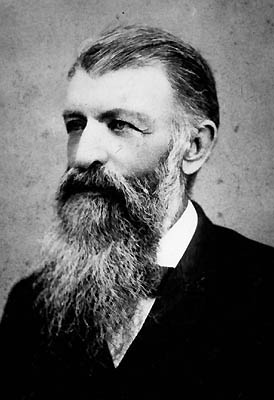

3rd Mayor of San Diego
- In office January 10, 1852 – February 28, 1852
- Preceded by: David B. Kurtz
- Succeeded by: William J. Hunsaker

Personal details
- Born: 1828 Concord, New Hampshire
- Died: January 9, 1909 (aged 80–81) San Francisco, California
- Spouse: Maria Delores Osuna Y Rodriguez
- Children: Maria Virginia Delos Reyes Tebbetts
- Education: Dartmouth College

George Parrish Tebbetts (1828 – January 9, 1909) was an American politician from California.

Tebbetts was born in Concord, New Hampshire, and graduated from Dartmouth College in 1848, where he studied medicine. With the California gold rush he sailed to San Francisco. While crossing the Isthmus of Panama, he cared for people suffering from yellow fever.

He prospected with a Chinese boy on the American River near Sacramento and they extracted $70,000 in gold. The San Diego History Center describes what followed: They returned to San Francisco. "There the boy expressed a wish to return to China, and Tebbetts settled with him for $3,000. The boy returned to China, and as the years rolled by, nothing was heard from him. Forty-five years later he walked into Tebbett's office in Santa Barbara and introduced himself. The surprise meeting after so many years was an enjoyable occasion, with much reminiscing by the two lucky gold seekers."

Tebbetts arrived in San Diego around 1850 and was co-proprietor of the Exchange Hotel. He was elected Councilman for 1851–1852. In 1852 he became the third mayor of San Diego under U.S. rule. While mayor, a series of murders, horse thievery, and lawlessness caused locals to organize The Vigilantes to keep the peace. When Tebbetts' horse was stolen, the thieves were caught, paraded around town with nooses around their necks, and lynched. Federal officials investigated, but gave up when Tebbetts told them the entire town was involved.

In 1852 the city was bankrupt. The city charter was abolished and city administration was performed by a board of trustees with no mayor, operated by the state.

Tebbetts later was member of the San Diego County Board of Supervisors during 1854–1864.

During an Indian war at Warner Springs in the early 1850s, Tebbetts served as ensign with Fitzgerald's Volunteers. The uprising was caused by an 1844 Mexican land grant that included Cupa, the village of the Cupeňo people, and surrounding homelands. During the war Tebbetts participated in a "Dual" with Joshua Bean as a practical joke.

Tebbets ran the Exchange Hotel, with a partner Philip Hooff, from 1850 or 1851. The hotel was owned by his father-in-law Juan Rodríguez and sold in 1858. George Derby immortalized them in his satirical book Phoenixiana referring to Tebbetts and Hoof as "Two bitts" (because of his small size) and "Cloven Hooff".

Tebbetts bought the San Luis Rey Ranch in the late 1850s. In the late 1860s he moved to Santa Barbara where he bought the San Roque Ranch, was appointed Postmaster, and started the Santa Barbara Press, Daily Independent, and Daily News.

Tebbetts married twice, with four children (Horace, Stella, John, and Maria Virginia De Los Reyes) from his first marriage with Delorez Rodríguez (Maria Delos Reyes Osuna Y Rodriguez), daughter of Juan Rodríguez, and three children from his second marriage to Mary Jones. Maria Tebbetts (Maria Virginia De Los Reyes Tebbetts) married Brigadier-General Frank Clarke Prescott N.G.C.

Later, he moved in with his son Nathan in San Francisco where he died 1909.

== See also ==
- "George Parrish Tebbetts", The Journal of San Diego History 9:2 (April 1963) by Orion Zink
- "The Exchange Hotel", The Journal of San Diego History 8:4 (October 1962) by Orion Zink
- "Tebbetts Genealogy" by Richard Prescott Bale

Political offices
Preceded by David B. Kurtz	Mayor of San Diego, California; 1852	Succeeded by William J. Hunsaker
