= Joshua Bean =

First mayor of San Diego, California (c. 1818–1852)

Joshua H. Bean
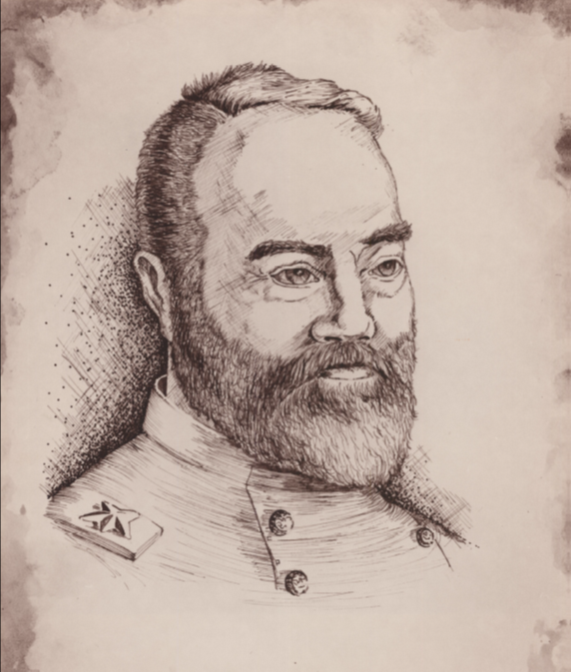

1st Mayor of San Diego
- In office June 17, 1850 – January 14, 1851
- Preceded by: Office established
- Succeeded by: David B. Kurtz

Personal details
- Born: c. 1818 Mason County, Kentucky, U.S.
- Died: November 7, 1852 (aged 33–34) Los Angeles, California, U.S.

Joshua H. Bean (c. 1818 – November 7, 1852) was an American soldier and the first mayor of San Diego, serving from 1850 to 1851.

== Biography ==
Bean was born circa 1818 in Mason County, Kentucky, to Phantly Roy Bean and his wife, Anna Gore. His paternal grandparents were Benjamin Bean and his wife Fernetta Johnston, daughter of Archibald Johnston. Both grandparents were born in Virginia. Bean had a brother Roy, named for their father. He later achieved notability as a judge on the New Mexico frontier, known as Judge Roy Bean.

Joshua Bean served with Zachary Taylor in the Mexican–American War and went to California in 1849. He settled in San Diego in 1850, where he was a trader and saloon owner. Bean was soon appointed Major General of the State Militia. He led forces to crush the Antonio Garra revolt in 1851. Later, he had a small role in preventing the massacre of John Edward Irvine near Redlands, California. San Diego was incorporated by the California State Legislature in 1850. While serving as the last alcalde of San Diego and them first mayor of San Diego, he sold City Hall and the surrounding pueblo lands to himself and an associate, Cave Johnson Couts, for $2.50. Following a lawsuit, the property was returned to the city, and he later resigned from office over a pay dispute. He served as mayor from 1850 to 1851.

In 1851, he moved to Los Angeles, where he kept a saloon and store in Mission San Gabriel, which he called the Headquarters. In 1852 he was ambushed and killed, just outside Mission San Gabriel, during an argument over a woman. Four males were accused of his murder, and were executed. But, officials learned later that the son of Victoria Reid was responsible for Bean's death.

Reyes Feliz, a Hispanic youth, was one of those charged in the murder of Bean. He had given evidence that he had overheard men saying that the killer was the California Bandito Joaquin Murieta.

Bean's brother Roy took over the saloon, and operated it until 1853. He fled California for New Mexico after being indicted for being involved in a knife fight. There he was appointed as a judge and became known as Judge Roy Bean, notable on the frontier.

Political offices
Preceded by Thomas W. Sutherland - Alcalde	Mayor of San Diego; 1850–1851	Succeeded by David B. Kurtz
