= A. S. Ensworth =

American politician

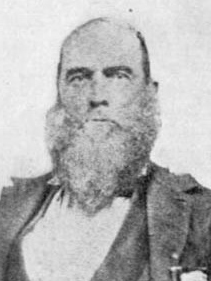
- Ensworth in the 1850s

Member of the California State Assembly from the 1st district
- In office January 3, 1859 – January 2, 1860
- Preceded by: Robert W. Groom
- Succeeded by: Robert W. Groom

Personal details
- Born: 1810 Connecticut
- Died: September 13, 1865 (aged 54–55) Los Angeles, California
- Party: Democratic

Augustus S. "Squire" Ensworth (1810 – September 13, 1865) was an American politician who served as a member of the California State Assembly, representing the 1st District from 1859 to 1860.

== Life and career ==
Ensworth was born in Connecticut around 1810, moving to Texas during the Texas Revolution and serving in the Army of the Republic of Texas from November 3, 1836 to November 11, 1837. He settled in Goliad where he was elected as chief justice in January 1840, resigning from the post to become a commissioner by the end of the month. He was later elected to the Congress of the Republic of Texas and served from 1840 to 1841. By 1850, he was not listed on the census, and is likely that he moved to San Diego, California as a teamster, arriving in the city in the 1850s.

In 1856, he became a justice of the peace for San Diego, and in 1859 was elected as a member of the California State Assembly for the 1st district. Sometime after, he met Thomas Whaley, an early settler of San Diego, and by 1860 was handling his business activities, living in the Whaley House and serving as an accountant. In 1863, he filed a claim for a 160-acre ranch that included Spring Valley, where he built an adobe house that was later sold to Rufus King Porter and later to historian Hubert Howe Bancroft.

== Death ==
In 1865, Ensworth suffered from a broken leg and was admitted to the Sisters of Charity Hospital in Los Angeles. On September 13, 1865, he died from an infection, with judge Benjamin Ignatius Hayes informing Whaley about his death.

Preceded by Robert W. Groom	1st District, California State Assembly; 1859–1860	Succeeded by Robert W. Groom
