= Quartzburg, Idaho =

Unincorporated community in the state of Idaho, United States

Coordinates: 43°57′40″N 115°59′18″W

Quartzburg is an unincorporated town in Boise County, in the U.S. state of Idaho.

== History ==
The discovery of gold, silver, and other valuable natural resources throughout the Idaho territory beginning in the 1860s, as well as the completion of the Transcontinental Railroad in 1869, brought many new people to the area, including Chinese laborers who came to work the mines. Where two rivers, creeks, or streams divided, prospectors would each and follow the richer one in their search for the source of the gold also known as the mother lode.

A quartz vein outcropping containing gold was discovered by prospectors in 1862 which led to a series of mining claims that resulted in the formation of a mining district called territory Quartzburg aka Quartburgh. Just before WWII a catastrophic fire consumed both the mine mill and small town in 1938. Two years after the fire the post office closed signaling the end of 78 years of prospecting, mining, and logging. The 1941 Mining Act prohibited precious metal mining through the war and small mining never recovered in the United States.

The Idaho territory was once the home of upwards of as many as 8,000 Chinese miners. The 1870 census reported there were 1,751 Chinese in Idaho City who were nearly half of city residents. Annie Lee was a legendary Idaho city woman who like Polly Bemis, escaped enslavement as a prostitute. She escaped from a member of the Yeong Wo Company in the 1870s to Boise to marry her lover, another Chinese man. that she wanted to remain in Boise. The story of Polly Bemis, who helped settle the Idaho territory, became the basis for the novel and fictionalized 1991 film A Thousand Pieces of Gold, which was set in California. Idaho became the fourth state to grant women the right to vote in 1896, six years after gaining statehood.

== Town Name ==
The name of the town has changed over time. The town began as Quartzburg, was changed to Quartzburgh in 1894, and then finally Quartzburg.

== Regional Geography ==
The Boise Basin, which lies in Boise County, Idaho, is an intermountain depression near the western edge of the mountainous region that occupies the central part of the State. The Boise Basin is separated from the Snake River plains on the west by Boise Ridge; the low-lying divide between Payette River and Mores Creek is its northern boundary; and high mountains flank it on the east and south. Rock Type: Mesozoic intrusive rocks Rock Age: Cretaceous (66 - 145 Ma)

== Quartz ==
Quartz Formula:SiO2 At higher temperatures and pressures quartz is easily dissolved by watery fluids percolating the rock. When silica-rich solutions penetrate cooler rocks, the silica will precipitate as quartz in fissures, forming thin white seams as well as large veins which may extend over many kilometers. In most cases, the quartz in these veins will be massive, but they may also contain well-formed quartz crystals. Phyllites and schists often contain thin lenticular or regular veins of so-called "segregation quartz" that run parallel to the bedding and are the result of local transport of silica during metamorphosis. Silica-rich fluids are also driven out of solidifying magma bodies. When these hot brines enter cooler rocks, the solution gets oversaturated in silica, and quartz forms.

== Orogeny ==
The process by which structures within fold-belt mountainous areas were formed, including thrusting, folding, and faulting in the outer and higher layers, and plastic folding, metamorphism, and plutonism in the inner and deeper layers. Adj: orogenic; orogenetic.

== Orogenic Gold Deposits ==
Orogenic gold deposits (Böhlke, 1982) dominantly form in metamorphic rocks in the mid- to shallow crust (5–15 km depth), at or above the brittle-ductile transition, in compressional settings that facilitate transfer of hot gold-bearing fluids from deeper levels. The term “orogenic” is used because these deposits likely form in accretionary and collisional orogens.

Transfer of weakly oxidized, low-salinity fluids to the sites of gold deposition is controlled by earthquake events, allowing fluids to rapidly traverse large thicknesses of the crust. This rapid rise takes the fluids out of equilibrium with their surrounding rocks, promoting destabilization of the gold-carrying hydrosulfide complexes [Au(HS)2− and AuHS]. The chemical cause of gold precipitation, facilitated by a temperature-pressure decrease, varies from place to place, and mechanisms such as fluid-rock reaction, boiling, fluid mixing, and chemisorption on surfaces of pyrite and arsenopyrite have been proposed.

== Nearby Towns and Accessibility ==
In the late 1800s and early 1900s, Idaho City, Centerville, Placerville, Quartzburg, and Pioneerville were the principal centers of the Idaho gold mining industry.

All the towns are connected by roads, and several roads lead to outside points. Idaho City, the county seat, is connected to Boise by a 32 mile long.

- From Horseshoe Bend - Hawkins toll road crossed a ridge at an altitude of 5,500 feet and connected Placerville and Horseshoe Bend. Now called Harris Creek Road. - Garden Valley to Placerville - Alder Creek Road. - Pioneerville is also connected with Garden Valley by a road over Grimes Pass. - East of Idaho City a road crosses the divide between the drainage basins of Moore Creek and North Fork of Boise River and leads to the Edna and Banner silver mines.

== Early Railroads ==
James T. Barber founded the Barber Lumber Company in 1902 with a group of investors. The company employed upwards of 300 men who constructed a wooden dam across the Boise River to provide a log pond and an electrical plant for the sawmill. In addition to the sawmill, Barber Lumber Company also consisted of a planing mill, box factory, dry kilns, lumber yard, horse barns, and a railroad with facilities for locomotives and railroad cars. The Barber sawmill closed in 1935.

Intermountain Railroad was owned and operated by the Barber Lumber Co. The Intermountain Railroad serviced the Boise Basin and mining communities early on.

== Last Chance Mill Mine ==
The Last Chance Mine is a gold mine located in Boise County, Idaho at an elevation of 4,902 feet.

In 1899 the mine was owned by three men. O.J. Daly had 50%, Henry Beary and George Faull each owned 25%.

== Gold Hill Mine ==
After a fire consumed the mill and town in 1938, the mine was abandoned.

== Geology ==
THe porphryr belt that extends NE of Quartzburg is composed of quartz diorite, granite porphyry, diorite, and rhyolite. A comprehensive list of minerals can be found here.
