= D. B. Hoffman =

American politician

Member of the California State Assembly
- In office 1862–1863
- Preceded by: David B. Kurtz
- Succeeded by: Jeptha J. Kendrick

Personal details
- Profession: Politician

D. B. Hoffman served as a member of the 1862-1863 California State Assembly, representing California's 1st State Senate district.

Political offices
Preceded by David B. Kurtz	1st District, California State Assembly; 1862	Succeeded by Jeptha J. Kendrick
