= J. J. Murphy (politician) =

American politician

Member of the California State Assembly from the 1st district
- In office January 5, 1925 – January 7, 1929
- Preceded by: G. H. Douglas
- Succeeded by: Henry M. McGuinness

Personal details
- Born: October 4, 1868 Nova Scotia, Canada
- Died: September 26, 1951 (aged 82) Weed, California
- Party: Republican
- Spouse: Janette E. Langdon
- Children: 5

James John Murphy (October 4, 1868 – September 26, 1951) served in the California legislature and was born in Canada. He was a part of California's 1st State Assembly district and served from January 5, 1925 – January 7, 1929. After his first term, he resigned telling his constituents,"Sacramento is no place for an honest man."
