= William N. Robinson =

American politician

William N. Robinson served as a member of the 1869–71 California State Assembly, representing California's 1st State Assembly district.

Political offices
| Preceded by Benjamin Hayes | 1st District, California State Assembly; 1869–1870 | Succeeded by George M. Dannals |
