= California's 1st senatorial district =

American legislative district

California's 1st State Senate district
Current senator
Megan Dahle; R–Bieber
- Population (2010) • Voting age • Citizen voting age: 935,336; 728,887; 672,832
- Demographics: 79.41% White; 1.84% Black; 10.73% Latino; 4.59% Asian; 2.52% Native American; 0.27% Hawaiian/Pacific Islander; 0.27% other; 0.37% remainder of multiracial
- Registered voters: 618,334
- Registration: 42.07% Republican; 30.27% Democratic; 19.85% No party preference

California's 1st state senatorial district is one of 40 California State Senate districts. The district is represented by Republican Megan Dahle of Bieber.

== District profile ==
The district includes most of the California Cascades, northern Sierra Nevada and the Sacramento Valley, comprising Siskiyou, Modoc, Lassen, Shasta, Tehama, Plumas, Glenn, Colusa, Butte, Sutter, Yuba, Nevada, and Sierra Counties, along with eastern Placer County.

== Election results from statewide races ==
Year	Office	Results
2021	Recall	Yes 61.8 – 38.2%
2020	President	Trump 53.8 – 43.8%
2018	Governor	Cox 59.9 – 40.1%
2018	Senator	de Leon 55.7 - 44.3%
2016	President	Trump 54.3 – 38.6%
2016	Senator	Harris 62.9 – 37.1%
2014	Governor	Kashkari 55.0 – 45.0%
2012	President	Romney 57.3 – 39.9%
2012	Senator	Emken 57.9 – 42.1%
2010	Governor	Whitman 52.4 – 42.5%
2010	Senator	Fiorina 57.4 – 36.2%
2008	President	McCain 52.1 – 45.8%
2006	Governor	Schwarzenegger 71.0 – 24.0%
2006	Senator	Mountjoy 48.8 – 46.0%
2004	President	Bush 60.2 – 38.6%
2004	Senator	Jones 54.2 – 42.2%
2003	Recall	Yes 69.0 – 31.0%
2003	Recall	Schwarzenegger 59.9 – 18.5%
2002	Governor	Simon 57.2 – 31.8%
2000	President	Bush 57.6 – 36.3%
2000	Senator	Campbell 50.5 – 41.0%
1998	Governor	Lungren 51.5 – 44.9%
1998	Senator	Fong 51.1 – 44.0%
1996	President	Dole 50.8 – 37.1%
1994	Governor	Wilson 65.3 – 28.7%
1994	Senator	Huffington 55.1 – 35.8%
1992	President	Bush 39.2 – 34.9%
1992	Senator	Herschensohn 50.5 – 36.9%
1992	Senator	Seymour 45.3 – 45.2%

== List of senators representing the district ==
Due to redistricting, the 1st district has been moved around different parts of the state. The current iteration resulted from the 2021 redistricting by the California Citizens Redistricting Commission.

Senators	Party	Years served	Electoral history	Counties represented
Jonathan Warner (San Diego)	Democratic	January 6, 1851 – January 5, 1852	Elected in 1850. Re-elected in 1851. [data missing]	San Diego
David B. Kurtz (San Diego)	Whig	January 5, 1852 – January 1, 1855	Elected in 1852. Re-elected in 1854. [data missing]	San Diego
David B. Kurtz (San Diego)	Whig	January 5, 1852 – January 1, 1855	Elected in 1852. Re-elected in 1854. [data missing]	San Diego, Los Angeles, San Bernardino
Benjamin D. Wilson (Los Angeles)	Democratic	January 1, 1855 – January 4, 1858	Elected in 1855. [data missing]	San Diego, Los Angeles, San Bernardino
Cameron E. Thom (Los Angeles)	Democratic	January 4, 1858 – January 2, 1860	Elected in 1857. [data missing]	San Diego, Los Angeles, San Bernardino
Andrés Pico (Los Angeles)	Whig	January 2, 1860 – January 6, 1862	Elected in 1859. [data missing]	San Diego, Los Angeles, San Bernardino
Jacob C. Bogart (San Diego)	Democratic	January 6, 1862 – December 7, 1863	Elected in 1861. [data missing]	San Diego, San Bernardino
M. C. Tuttle (San Bernardino)	Union	December 7, 1863 – December 2, 1867	Elected in 1863. [data missing]	San Diego, San Bernardino
W. A. Conn (San Bernardino)	Democratic	December 2, 1867 – December 4, 1871	Elected in 1867. [data missing]	San Diego, San Bernardino
James McCoy (San Diego)	Democratic	December 4, 1871 – December 6, 1875	Elected in 1871. [data missing]	San Diego, San Bernardino
John W. Satterwhite (San Bernardino)	Independent; Democrat	December 6, 1875 – January 8, 1883	Elected in 1875. Re-elected in 1879. [data missing]	San Diego, San Bernardino
John W. Satterwhite (San Bernardino)	Democratic	December 6, 1875 – January 8, 1883	Elected in 1875. Re-elected in 1879. [data missing]	San Diego, San Bernardino
John C. Wolfskill (Riverside)	Democratic	January 8, 1883 – January 5, 1885	Elected in 1882. [data missing]	San Diego, San Bernardino
A. P. Johnson (San Diego)	Republican	January 5, 1885 – January 3, 1887	Elected in 1884. [data missing]	San Diego, San Bernardino
John P. Haynes (Eureka)	Democratic	January 3, 1887 – January 7, 1889	Elected in 1886. [data missing]	Del Norte, Humboldt
Frank McGowan (Eureka)	Republican	January 7, 1889 – January 4, 1897	Elected in 1888. Re-elected in 1892. [data missing]	Del Norte, Humboldt
James Gillett (Eureka)	Republican	January 4, 1897 – January 1, 1901	Elected in 1896. Retired to run for U.S. House of Representatives.	Del Norte, Humboldt
Thomas H. Selvage (Eureka)	Republican	January 1, 1901 – January 7, 1907	Elected in 1900. Re-elected in 1904. [data missing]	Del Norte, Humboldt
Thomas H. Selvage (Eureka)	Republican	January 1, 1901 – January 7, 1907	Elected in 1900. Re-elected in 1904. [data missing]	Del Norte, Humboldt, Trinity, Tehama
George T. Rolley (Eureka)	Republican	January 7, 1907 – January 4, 1909	Elected in 1906. [data missing]	Del Norte, Humboldt, Trinity, Tehama
Charles P. Cutten (Eureka)	Republican	January 4, 1909 – January 6, 1913	Elected in 1908. [data missing]	Del Norte, Humboldt, Trinity, Tehama
William Kehoe (Eureka)	Republican	January 6, 1913 – January 3, 1921	Elected in 1912. Re-elected in 1916. [data missing]	Del Norte, Humboldt, Trinity, Tehama
H. C. Nelson (Eureka)	Republican	January 3, 1921 – January 2, 1933	Elected in 1920. Re-elected in 1924. Re-elected in 1928. Lost renomination.	Del Norte, Humboldt, Trinity, Tehama
Harold J. Powers (Cedarville)	Republican	January 2, 1933 – October 5, 1953	Elected in 1932. Re-elected in 1936. Re-elected in 1940. Re-elected in 1944. Re-elected in 1948. Re-elected in 1852. Resigned to become Lieutenant Governor of California.	Lassen, Modoc, Plumas
Vacant		October 5, 1953 – December 29, 1953		Lassen, Modoc, Plumas
Dale C. Williams (Alturas)	Democratic	December 29, 1953 – May 12, 1955	Elected to finish Powers's term. Died.	Lassen, Modoc, Plumas
Vacant		May 12, 1955 – January 5, 1956		Lassen, Modoc, Plumas
Stanley Arnold (Susanville)	Democratic	January 5, 1956 – July 16, 1965	Elected to finish Williams's term. Re-elected in 1956. Re-elected in 1960. Re-elected in 1964. Resigned when appointed to the Lassen County Superior Court.	Lassen, Modoc, Plumas
Vacant		July 16, 1965 – January 2, 1967		Lassen, Modoc, Plumas
Randolph Collier (Yreka)	Democratic	January 2, 1967 – November 30, 1976	Redistricted from the 2nd district and re-elected in 1966. Re-elected in 1968. Re-elected in 1972. Lost re-election.	Del Norte, Humboldt, Lake, Mendocino, Siskiyou, Sonoma, Trinity
Ray E. Johnson (Chico)	Republican	December 6, 1976 – March 7, 1983	Elected in 1976. Re-elected in 1980. Lost re-election.	Butte, Colusa, Glenn, Lassen, Modoc, Nevada, Placer, Placer, Shasta, Sierra, Siskiyou, Sutter, Tehama, Trinity, Yuba
Ray E. Johnson (Chico)	Independent	March 7, 1983 – November 30, 1984	Elected in 1976. Re-elected in 1980. Lost re-election.	Butte, Colusa, Glenn, Lassen, Modoc, Nevada, Placer, Placer, Shasta, Sierra, Siskiyou, Sutter, Tehama, Trinity, Yuba
John Doolittle (Rocklin)	Republican	December 3, 1984 – January 2, 1991	Redistricted from the 3rd district and re-elected in 1984. Re-elected in 1988. Resigned when elected to the U.S. House of Representatives.	El Dorado, Lassen, Modoc, Nevada, Placer, Plumas, Sacramento, Sierra, Siskiyou, Sutter, Trinity, Yolo, Yuba
Vacant		January 2, 1991 – May 16, 1991		El Dorado, Lassen, Modoc, Nevada, Placer, Plumas, Sacramento, Sierra, Siskiyou, Sutter, Trinity, Yolo, Yuba
Tim Leslie (Tahoe City)	Republican	May 16, 1991 – November 30, 2000	Elected to finish Doolittle's term. Re-elected in 1992. Re-elected in 1996. Term-limited and ran for California State Assembly.	Alpine, Amador, Butte, Calaveras, El Dorado, Lassen, Modoc, Mono, Nevada, Placer, Plumas, Sierra, Yuba
Rico Oller (San Andreas)	Republican	December 4, 2000 – November 30, 2004	Elected in 2000. Retired to run for U.S. House of Representatives.	Alpine, Amador, Butte, Calaveras, El Dorado, Lassen, Modoc, Mono, Nevada, Placer, Plumas, Sierra, Yuba
Dave Cox (Fair Oaks)	Republican	December 6, 2004 – July 13, 2010	Elected in 2004. Re-elected in 2008. Died.	Alpine, Amador, Calaveras, El Dorado, Lassen, Modoc, Mono, Nevada, Placer, Plumas, Sacramento, Sierra
Vacant		July 13, 2010 – January 6, 2011		Alpine, Amador, Calaveras, El Dorado, Lassen, Modoc, Mono, Nevada, Placer, Plumas, Sacramento, Sierra
Ted Gaines (El Dorado Hills)	Republican	January 6, 2011 – January 7, 2019	Elected to finish Cox's term. Re-elected in 2012. Re-elected in 2016. Resigned when elected to the California State Board of Equalization.	Alpine, Amador, Calaveras, El Dorado, Lassen, Modoc, Mono, Nevada, Placer, Plumas, Sacramento, Sierra
Ted Gaines (El Dorado Hills)	Republican	January 6, 2011 – January 7, 2019	Elected to finish Cox's term. Re-elected in 2012. Re-elected in 2016. Resigned when elected to the California State Board of Equalization.	Alpine, El Dorado, Lassen, Modoc, Nevada, Placer, Plumas, Sacramento, Shasta, Shasta, Siskiyou
Vacant		January 7, 2019 – June 12, 2019		Alpine, El Dorado, Lassen, Modoc, Nevada, Placer, Plumas, Sacramento, Shasta, Shasta, Siskiyou
Brian Dahle (Bieber)	Republican	June 12, 2019 – November 30, 2024	Elected to finish Gaines's term. Re-elected in 2020. Term-limited and retired.	Alpine, El Dorado, Lassen, Modoc, Nevada, Placer, Plumas, Sacramento, Shasta, Shasta, Siskiyou
Megan Dahle (Bieber)	Republican	December 2, 2024 – present	Elected in 2024.	Alpine, El Dorado, Lassen, Modoc, Nevada, Placer, Plumas, Sacramento, Shasta, Shasta, Siskiyou

== Election results (1990-present) ==
=== 2024 ===
2024 California State Senate 1st district election
Primary election
Party	Candidate	Votes	%
Republican	Megan Dahle	154,305	77.2
Republican	David Fennell	45,686	22.8
Total votes		199,991	100.0
General election
Republican	Megan Dahle	274,894	75.7
Republican	David Fennell	88,317	24.3
Total votes		363,211	100.0
Republican hold			

=== 2020 ===
2020 California State Senate 1st district election
Primary election
Party	Candidate	Votes	%
Republican	Brian Dahle (incumbent)	200,537	57.7
Democratic	Pamela Dawn Swartz	125,585	36.1
No party preference	Linda Kelleher	21,557	6.2
Total votes		347,679	100.0
General election
Republican	Brian Dahle (incumbent)	326,836	59.7
Democratic	Pamela Dawn Swartz	220,563	40.3
Total votes		547,399	100.0
Republican hold			

=== 2019 (special) ===
2019 California State Senate 1st district special election Vacancy resulting from the resignation of Ted Gaines
Primary election
Party	Candidate	Votes	%
Republican	Brian Dahle	57,725	29.6
Republican	Kevin Kiley	54,290	27.9
Democratic	Silke Pflueger	49,164	25.2
Republican	Rex Hime	18,050	9.3
Democratic	Steve Baird	10,855	5.6
Republican	Theodore Dziuba	4,672	2.4
Total votes		194,756	100.0
General election
Republican	Brian Dahle	84,503	53.9
Republican	Kevin Kiley	72,169	46.1
Total votes		156,672	100.0
Republican hold			

=== 2016 ===
2016 California State Senate 1st district election
Primary election
Party	Candidate	Votes	%
Republican	Ted Gaines (incumbent)	140,739	49.4
Democratic	Rob Rowen	104,262	36.6
Republican	Steven Baird	39,958	14.1
Total votes		284,959	100.0
General election
Republican	Ted Gaines (incumbent)	287,314	64.0
Democratic	Rob Rowen	161,502	36.0
Total votes		448,816	100.0
Republican hold			

=== 2012 ===
2012 California State Senate 1st district election
Primary election
Party	Candidate	Votes	%
Republican	Ted Gaines (incumbent)	110,168	48.2
Democratic	Julie Griffith-Flatter	68,947	30.2
Republican	Les Baugh	37,442	16.4
No party preference	"Bo" Bogdan I. Ambrozewicz	11,923	5.2
Total votes		228,480	100.0
General election
Republican	Ted Gaines (incumbent)	263,256	63.7
Democratic	Julie Griffith-Flatter	150,111	36.3
Total votes		413,367	100.0
Republican hold			

=== 2011 (special) ===
2011 California State Senate 1st district special election Vacancy resulting from the death of Dave Cox
Party	Candidate	Votes	%
Republican	Ted Gaines	91,083	62.9
Democratic	Ken Cooley	53,747	37.1
Republican	Joseph McCray, Sr. (write-in)	28	0.0
Total votes		144,858	100.0
Republican hold			

=== 2008 ===
2008 California State Senate 1st district election
Party	Candidate	Votes	%
Republican	Dave Cox (incumbent)	267,426	62.3
Democratic	Anselmo Chavez	162,044	37.7
Total votes		429,470	100.0
Republican hold			

=== 2004 ===
2004 California State Senate 1st district election
Party	Candidate	Votes	%
Republican	Dave Cox	261,207	62.8
Democratic	Kristine Lang McDonald	141,462	34.1
Libertarian	Roberto Leibman	13,292	3.1
Total votes		415,961	100.0
Republican hold			

=== 2000 ===
2000 California State Senate 1st district election
Party	Candidate	Votes	%
Republican	Rico Oller	220,427	57.8
Democratic	Thomas A. Romero	144,997	38.0
Libertarian	John Petersen	16,075	4.2
Total votes		381,499	100.0
Republican hold			

=== 1996 ===
1996 California State Senate 1st district election
Party	Candidate	Votes	%
Republican	Tim Leslie (incumbent)	215,931	63.2
Democratic	Thomas "Tom" Romero	125,894	36.8
No party	Lamar Norton Latimer (write-in)	55	0.0
Total votes		341,880	100.0
Republican hold			

=== 1992 ===
1992 California State Senate 1st district election
Party	Candidate	Votes	%
Republican	Tim Leslie (incumbent)	189,095	54.8
Democratic	Thomas A. Romero	123,563	35.8
Green	Kent Warner Smith	32,717	9.5
Total votes		345,375	100.0
Republican hold			

=== 1991 (special) ===
1991 California State Senate 1st district special election Vacancy resulting from the resignation of John Doolittle
Party	Candidate	Votes	%
Republican	Tim Leslie	44,941	43.0
Democratic	Patti Mattingly	32,811	31.4
Republican	Bob Dorr	19,880	19.0
Democratic	Bobby Harris	2,564	2.5
Republican	Sherry Numan	1,686	1.6
Democratic	Bill Steele	1,659	1.6
Libertarian	Gary Dusseljee	954	0.9
Total votes		104,495	100.0
General election
Republican	Tim Leslie	65,730	54.6
Democratic	Patti Mattingly	51,937	43.1
Libertarian	Gary Dusseljee	2,717	2.3
No party	Bobby Harris (write-in)	51	0.0
Total votes		120,435	100.0
Republican hold			

== See also ==
- California State Senate
- California State Senate districts
- Districts in California
