= John W. Satterwhite =

American politician

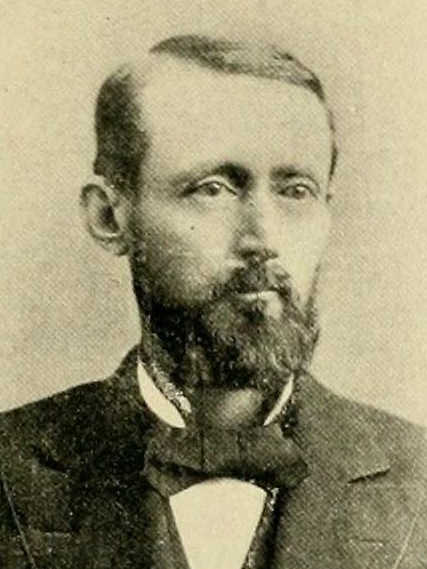
John W. Satterwhite

John Woodward Satterwhite served as a member of the 1865–1867 California State Assembly, representing California's 1st State Senate district.
