= David B. Kurtz =

2nd Mayor of San Diego (1819–1898)

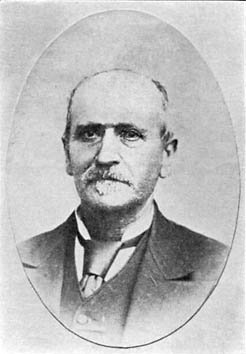

2nd Mayor of San Diego
- In office January 14, 1851 – January 10, 1852
- Preceded by: Joshua H. Bean
- Succeeded by: George P. Tebbetts

Personal details
- Born: 1819 Pennsylvania, US
- Died: March 23, 1898 (aged 78–79) San Luis Rey, California, US
- Party: Whig
- Other political affiliations: Democratic

David Brower Kurtz (1819 – March 23, 1898), also known as Daniel Brower Kurtz, was an American Whig and Democratic politician from California.

Kurtz was born in 1819 in Pennsylvania. He came to San Diego in 1850 where he studied law. He was admitted to the bar in 1856. He also was a contractor and constructed several buildings in Old Town San Diego and elsewhere.

Kurtz was the second mayor of San Diego under U.S. rule, from 1851 until 1852. He later was a member of the California State Senate in 1852 and 1855, as a Whig party member, county judge from 1855–1856, and member of the California State Assembly during 1861–1862 and 1865–1866, representing the 1st District.

During the Civil War Kurtz was a Breckinridge Democrat (Southern sympathizer). Kurtz was appointed brigadier-general of the State Militia in 1856. Kurtz was president of San Diego's Board of Trustees in 1862 when San Diego did not have a Mayoral form of government.

In 1866 he moved to San Luis Rey, California, in present Oceanside, California, and died there in 1898. He's buried at Mount Hope Cemetery in San Diego.

Kurtz Street, located in the Midway district and Middletown neighborhoods of San Diego, is named for him. The Fire Mountain area of Oceanside also has a Kurtz Street.

Political offices
Preceded by Joshua H. Bean	Mayor of San Diego, California; 1851—1852	Succeeded by George P. Tebbetts
Preceded by Robert W. Groom	1st District, California State Assembly; 1861—1862	Succeeded by D. B. Hoffman
Preceded by Rufus B. Tebbetts	President of the San Diego Board of Trustees; 1862–1865	Succeeded by Andrew Cassidy
Preceded by Jeptha J. Kendrick	1st District, California State Assembly; 1865—1866	Succeeded by George A. Johnson
