= Ednah Root =

American painter, philanthropist (1907–1987)

- Born: Edna Root Ehrbar; June 23, 1907; New York City, U.S.
- Died: August 4, 1987 (aged 80); Greenbrae, California, U.S.
- Other names: Edna Root, Edna Root Howard, Ednah Root Shapiro, Ednah Root Nicoloudis
- Education: Columbia University, Parsons School of Design, Grand Central School of Art, Art Students League of New York
- Occupations: Painter, textile designer, sculptor, muralist, philanthropist, arts patron
- Years active: 1920s–1980s
- Movement: Abstract expressionist
- Spouse(s): Hampton Warren Howard (m. 1939–1941; div.), Joseph M. Shapiro (m. 1966–1968; death), Constantine Nicoloudis (m. 1975–c.1978; div.)

Ednah Root (née Edna Root Ehrbar; June 23, 1907 – August 4, 1987) was an American painter, textile designer, philanthropist, and arts patron. She also worked as a sculptor, and muralist. She is the namesake of the nonprofit the Ednah Root Foundation, and the Ednah Root Curatorship of American Art at the Fine Arts Museums of San Francisco.

== Early life and education ==
Ednah Root was born as Edna Root Ehrbar on June 23, 1907, in New York City. Her parents were Florence Cathryn Root and Louis Harvey Ehrbar. She started painting in childhood. Root attended the Bond Street School in Asbury Park, New Jersey; and Asbury Park High School.

Initially she attended Columbia University. She studied at the Grand Central School of Art, the New York School of Fine and Applied Art (now Parsons School of Design), and the Art Students League of New York. Her teachers included Arshile Gorky, and Hans Hofmann.

== Career ==
In her early career Root created drawing and impasto paintings of abstract horses and mountains in earth tones, inspired by the landscape of Palm Springs. She worked as an abstract expressionist, and held exhibitions internationally.

Root designed a series of tapestries, woven by Nazareth Tapestry Ltd. in France.

She had established the Toy Clinics of America, to provide year-round presents to military personnel, and institutionalized people including children and the elderly.

For 30 years she lived winters in Palm Springs, California, and also in the Nob Hill neighborhood in San Francisco. Additionally Root had lived in La Jolla neighborhood in San Diego.

== Death and legacy ==
Root had a heart attack in her home in Stinson Beach, California. She died days later at age 80 on August 4, 1987, at Marin General Hospital (now MarinHealth Medical Center) in Greenbrae, California.

At the time of her death, her works were in more than 800 private collections. Root's work is included in the museum collections at the Whitney Museum of American Art in New York City, and the Rose Art Museum in Massachusetts.

She is the namesake of the Ednah Root Foundation, a private charitable foundation supporting San Francisco Bay Area nonprofits; and the Ednah Root Curatorship of American Art founded in 1979 at the Fine Arts Museums of San Francisco. Before her death Root had donated 650 acres (260 ha) of land in the Palm Springs area to the Fine Arts Museums of San Francisco.

== Personal life ==
In 1939 she married in Miami, Florida, to Hampton Warren Howard (1904–1972), a partner of the G.T. Howard cotton firm. The couple divorced in 1941 in Nevada.

She was later married to Joseph M. Shapiro (1888–1968) in 1966, founder of the Simplicity Pattern Company. Shapiro died in 1968.

In 1975, she married Constantine Nicoloudis, the Greek owner of a travel agency and yacht rental firm Nicoloudis Tours Ltd. The Nicoloudis' separated in the summer of 1978.

== Exhibitions ==
=== Solo exhibitions ===
- 1964, solo exhibition, Pietrantonio Galleries, New York City, New York
- 1967, Ednah Root Paintings and Tapestries, solo exhibition, Comara Gallery, 8475 Melrose Place, Los Angeles, California
- 1968, solo exhibition, Downey Art Museum, Downey, California
- 1969, solo exhibition, Galerie Du Jonelle, 241 East Tahquitz Way, Palm Springs, California
- 1969, solo exhibition, La Jolla Museum of Art (now Museum of Contemporary Art San Diego), San Diego, California
- 1970, The Art of Ednah Root, solo retrospective exhibition, Palm Springs Art Museum, Palm Springs, California
- 1973, solo exhibition, Parade Gallery, 3228 Sacramento Street, San Francisco, California
