= Peter H. Behr =

American politician (1915–1997)

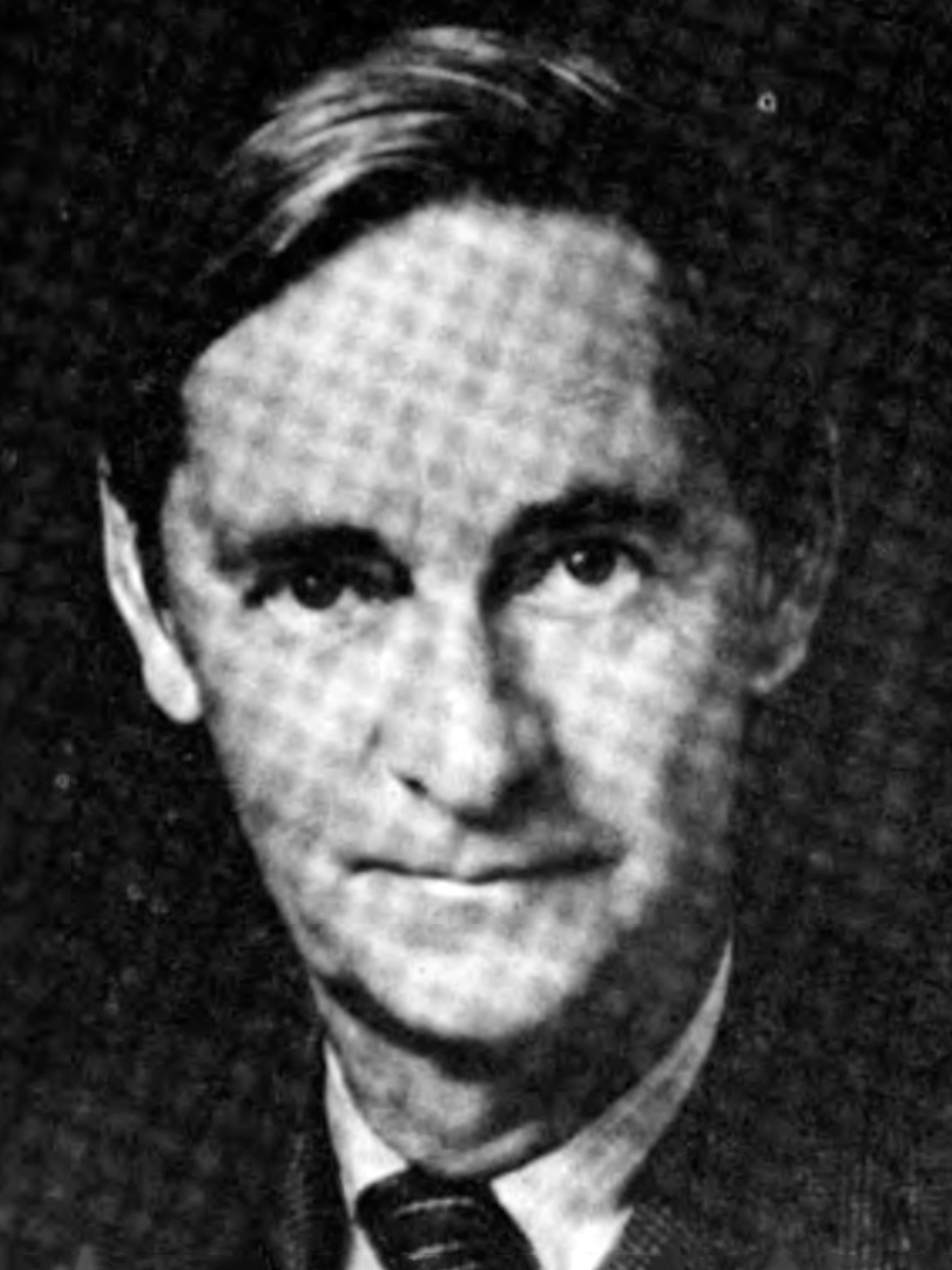
- Official portrait, 1971

Member of the California Senate from the 2nd district
- In office December 2, 1974 – November 30, 1978
- Preceded by: Fred W. Marler Jr.
- Succeeded by: Barry Keene

Member of the California Senate from the 4th district
- In office January 2, 1971 - November 30, 1974
- Preceded by: John F. McCarthy
- Succeeded by: John F. Dunlap

Personal details
- Born: May 24, 1915 New York City, New York, U.S.
- Died: March 10, 1997 (aged 81) Greenbrae, California, U.S.
- Party: Republican
- Spouse: Sally Clarkson (after 1942)
- Children: 3
- Education: Yale University; Yale Law School

Military service
- Branch/service: United States Navy
- Years of service: 1941-1946
- Rank: Lieutenant Commander
- Battles/wars: World War II

Peter H. Behr (May 24, 1915 – March 10, 1997) was a California State Senator and lawyer.

== Early life and career ==
Born in New York City, Behr attended primary school there before moving to Lawrenceville, New Jersey where he attended high school. He was a son of Karl Behr, a survivor of the sinking of the RMS Titanic. In 1933 he entered Yale University, from which he earned a bachelor's degree in 1937. He then attended Yale Law School from which he graduated in 1940. Behr served in the United States Navy during World War II, joining in 1941 and being discharged in 1946.

From 1946 to 1968 he had a private law practice in San Francisco. His first stint in public service was as a member of the Planning Commission in Mill Valley, California from 1953 to 1956, and as a Mill Valley city councilman from 1956 to 1960.

== Political career ==
Behr went on to serve on the Marin County Board of Supervisors from 1961 to 1970, and was elected as a Republican to two terms in the California State Senate from 1971 to 1978 in a district covering Marin and Sonoma counties. After leaving the Senate he remained active as an environmental protection activist in California. Although known as an environmentalist, Behr was curiously against rail transit. In 1990 a 1/2-cent sales tax increase was on the ballot in Marin and Sonoma counties to employ double-track electric rail transit between the communities of Cloverdale in Sonoma County and Larkspur in Marin County. Behr condemned this as "the ruination of Marin." The service was later implemented at much greater expense as SMART, starting in 2017.

A street adjacent to the Marin County Civic Center and a scenic overlook at Drakes Beach in the Point Reyes National Seashore are named in Behr's honor. The "Lifetime Achievement Award" of the Marin Conservation League and the "Peter Behr Steward of the Land Award" of the Environmental Action Committee of West Marin are named in his honor.

== Death ==
Behr died on March 10, 1997, at Marin General Hospital in Greenbrae, California, aged 81, after battling Parkinson's disease for six years.

== Sources ==
- California candidates bio of Behr
- University of California, Berkeley run oral history interview with Behr report
- Inventory of the Peter H. Behr Papers, 1971-1978
