= Sutter Health =

Not-for-profit integrated health delivery system

- Type: Not-for-profit
- Industry: Healthcare
- Founded: 1921; 105 years ago
- Headquarters: Sacramento, California
- Number of locations: 25 acute care hospitals
- Area served: California
- Key people: Warner Thomas, President & CEO
- Number of employees: 57,000
- Website: www.sutterhealth.org

Sutter Health is a not-for-profit integrated health delivery system headquartered in Sacramento, California. It operates 25 acute care hospitals and over 200 clinics in Northern California and Central California.

Sutter Hospital Association was founded in 1921 as a response to the 1918 flu pandemic. Named for nearby Sutter's Fort, its first hospital opened in 1923. Later known as Sutter Community Hospitals, the organization eventually merged with several struggling hospitals in the surrounding area.

== History ==
=== Origins ===
The organization takes its name from one of Sacramento’s original European settlements, Sutter's Fort, built by California pioneer John Sutter. In response to the 1918 flu pandemic, community leaders constructed the first Sutter Hospital in the vicinity of the fort, replacing an old adobe house that had previously served as a makeshift hospital. Sutter Medical Center, Sacramento occupies this site today.

Other Sutter Health hospitals date back to the 1800s and were some of Northern California's earliest healthcare providers. For example, California Pacific Medical Center in San Francisco was formed out of the successive hospital and medical school mergers dating back to the city's earliest days of organized medicine. The predecessor of today's Sutter Santa Rosa Regional Hospital opened its doors to residents of Sonoma County in 1866.

Many of the health care facilities that eventually became part of Sutter Health were created as charitable hospitals by community members in cities coping with growing populations, epidemics, fires, floods and earthquakes.

=== Late 20th century ===
Government cutbacks, the advent of managed care, and other financial pressures fueled an increase in hospital and physician organization mergers, acquisitions, and affiliations. By 1995, Sutter Health had grown to include 18 affiliated hospitals, seven medical foundations (physician organizations), and numerous outpatient care centers throughout Northern California.

In 1986, Pacific Presbyterian Medical Center in San Francisco, Mills-Peninsula Hospital in San Mateo, and Marin General Hospital in Greenbrae created an affiliation known as California Healthcare System (CHS). Berkeley-based Alta Bates Corporation (now known as Alta Bates Summit Medical Center) joined CHS in 1992, the same year that saw the creation of California Pacific Medical Center, formed through a merger of Pacific Presbyterian and Children's Hospital of San Francisco.

In January 1996, California Healthcare System merged with Sutter Health.

=== 21st century ===
The new century brought advances in healthcare technology. Sutter Health was among the first health systems in the United States to install barcode medication safety technology and an electronic intensive care unit.

In 2016, Sutter Health became the jersey sponsor of the San Jose Earthquakes. In 2019, the Sacramento River Cats stadium was renamed Sutter Health Park.

In 2025, Sutter Health was reported to have entered into a $13 million sports team sponsorship agreement with the National Women's Soccer League franchise Bay FC. In June 2025, the system began construction on a neuroscience facility in San Francisco, and later that year, in November, the system announced plans to build a medical center including a 272-bed hospital in Santa Clara,

In 2026, Sutter Health announced plans to enter the Minnesota and western Wisconsin markets with the acquisition of Minneapolis based Allina Health.

== Hospitals and medical groups ==
Sutter Health consists of 27 acute care hospitals and eleven medical groups, plus specialized centers for surgery, cancer care, cardiac care, rehab, and home care.

=== Hospitals ===
- Sutter Alta Bates Summit Medical Center (East Bay)
  - Alta Bates (Ashby) Campus (Berkeley)
  - Herrick Campus (Berkeley)
  - Summit Campus (Oakland)
- Sutter Amador Hospital (Jackson)
- Sutter Auburn Faith Hospital
- Sutter California Pacific Medical Center (San Francisco)
  - Davies Campus
  - Mission Bernal Campus
  - Van Ness Campus
- Sutter Center for Psychiatry (Sacramento)
- Sutter Coast Hospital (Crescent City)
- Sutter Davis Hospital
- Sutter Delta Medical Center (Antioch)
- Sutter Eden Medical Center (Castro Valley)
- Sutter Lakeside Hospital (Lakeport)
- Sutter Maternity & Surgery Center of Santa Cruz
- Sutter Memorial Hospital Los Banos
- Sutter Memorial Medical Center (Modesto)
- Sutter Medical Center, Sacramento
- Sutter Mills-Peninsula Medical Center (Burlingame)
- Sutter Novato Community Hospital
- Sutter Roseville Medical Center
- Sutter Santa Rosa Regional Hospital
- Sutter Solano Medical Center (Vallejo)
- Sutter Surgical Hospital North Valley (Yuba City)
- Sutter Tracy Community Hospital
- Mills San Mateo
- Anderson Lucchetti Women's & Children's Center

=== Medical groups ===
- Gould Medical Group
- Palo Alto Foundation Medical Group
- Sansum Santa Barbara Medical Group
- Sutter East Bay Medical Group
- Sutter Medical Group
- Sutter North Medical Group
- Sutter West Bay Medical Group
- Sutter Medical Group of the Redwoods

=== Other services ===
- Sutter Care at Home
- Sutter Walk-In Care
- Sutter Urgent Care

=== Past and future changes ===
In 2010, Marin General Hospital (now MarinHealth Medical Center) left Sutter Health to operate independently under the Marin Healthcare District.

In 2016, Sutter Health informed Berkeley's mayor of its plans to close Alta Bates by 2030 and relocate its services to the Oakland branch. The reason provided for the move was the infeasibility of the required seismic upgrades for the hospital. In 2025, Sutter announced it would replace Alta Bates with a new campus set to open in Emeryville in 2030. However, in October 2026, it announced that plans for the Emeryville campus would be scrapped due to regulatory challenges, without changes to the plans for closure of the Alta Bates hospital.

== Notable services ==
Sutter Health doctors and hospitals provide a variety of clinical services including cancer care, complementary medicine, diabetes care, heart care, children's health, home health/hospice, mental health care, orthopedics, pregnancy and childbirth, sleep disorders, transplant services, and weight loss surgery (bariatrics).

Sutter Health affiliates have been nationally recognized for cardiac care, neonatology, transplant care, and neurosurgery.

Until the opening of UCSF Benioff Children's Hospital's pediatric emergency department in 2013, Sutter ran the only pediatric emergency department in San Francisco.

Scout by Sutter Health is a 12-week, nonclinical program targeted at people aged 12 to 26 designed to help them deal with anxiety, depression, and stress. It has weekly screenings for anxiety and depression. Personalized content is determined by their responses to the screenings. Modules are also sent to caregivers, mostly parents. Exercises are offered. Nonclinical guides are provided by Boston-based Docent Health. In 2022, Ada Health was integrated into the program.

In 2025, Sutter Center for Psychiatry, in the Sacramento region, was reported as the first in the area to offer Stanford Accelerated Intelligent Neuromodulation Therapy (SAINT), a newer therapy for depression.

== Quality ==
Sutter Health doctors and hospitals participate in voluntary and mandatory programs that publicly report patient satisfaction, cost, utilization, and quality of care measures. These include Hospital Compare, California Healthcare Foundation, California Office of the Patient Advocate, and The Leapfrog Group.

Sutter Health-affiliated hospitals and medical groups have been recognized by several independent healthcare quality organizations. For example:

- 2016, Truven Health Analytics named Sutter Health among the top-performing health systems in the country in its 15 Top Health Systems study.
- 2013, Sutter Davis Hospital became the first Northern California hospital to receive the Malcolm Baldrige National Quality Award, the nation's highest presidential honor for performance excellence through innovation, improvement, and visionary leadership.
- 2007, the Lewin Group ranked Sutter Health as the top healthcare system in California for quality and 30th in the United States.
- 2009, SDI Health ranked Sutter Health fifth among the "Top 100" integrated healthcare networks in the United States.
- 2008, the Integrated Healthcare Association recognized several Sutter Health affiliates for accomplishments in areas of clinical care including heart care, preventive care, chronic care management, pneumonia, patient satisfaction and use of information technology.
- 2007, the Adaptive Business Leaders organization named Sutter Health's eICU as the most innovative approach to health care delivery.

In 2014, Jonathan Rauch wrote for the Brookings Institution and The Atlantic about Sutter Health's Advanced Illness Management (AIM) program, which improves quality of life for patients with advanced, chronic illness, reduces unnecessary hospitalizations, and makes care more cost-effective.

In 2015, NPR in Los Angeles reported that the Sutter Health network doctors are standardizing treatment and testing options to make care more consistent and help reduce overall costs for patients while maintaining care quality.

In 2020, 60 Minutes ran a story about how the Sutter Health system increased health care costs in California.

== Legal actions ==
In 2004, Sutter Health implemented a systemwide policy for charity care and health care discounts for uninsured and underinsured patients. In 2006 Sutter Health expanded its policy to offer automatic discounts to uninsured patients. Later, along with several other health systems, it reached settlement agreements in class-action lawsuits related to the billing of uninsured patients.

In 2012, Sutter Health was sued for allegedly violating antitrust laws by engaging in anticompetitive practices leading to higher prices for health insurance premiums paid by both individuals and employers. In 2025, Sutter Health agreed to pay $228.5 million to settle the class-action lawsuit, with approximately 3 million people being eligible for payment from the settlement fund.

In 2014, the United Food and Commercial Workers (UFCW) union & Employers Benefit Trust (UEBT) filed a class action antitrust lawsuit against Sutter Health. In 2018, California Attorney General Xavier Becerra filed a lawsuit against Sutter Health, alleging antitrust. The Attorney General and UFCW ultimately settled their combined cases out of court in December 2019. Under the terms of the settlement, Sutter was not required to admit wrongdoing, but will pay plaintiffs $575 million in damages, and has agreed to significantly change its anti-competitive business practices.

In 2021, Sutter Health agreed to pay $90 million to settle a whistleblower lawsuit under the False Claims Act alleging that it submitted unsupported diagnosis codes to inflate Medicare Advantage payments.

In 2025, Sutter Health agreed to pay $21.5 million to settle a class-action lawsuit alleging violations of the California Invasion of Privacy Act. The plaintiffs claimed the health system shared patient data with third-party advertisers, including Google and Meta, through tracking software embedded on its website and patient portal login pages.

== Labor relations ==
Sutter Health's physician organizations, hospitals, home health, and other services have nearly 60 locally negotiated collective bargaining agreements with more than one dozen different labor unions. Approximately 13,700 employees have elected to work under labor union contracts.

In April 2022 over 8,000 nurses and other healthcare workers in 15 Northern California Sutter Health facilities represented by the California Nurses Association and affiliates struck for one day, asking for "safer staffing levels" and other contract demands. Sutter locked out the striking workers for a week.

== See also ==
- Healthcare in California
