= Senator Slattery (disambiguation) =

James M. Slattery (1878–1948) was a U.S. Senator from California from 1939 to 1940. Senator Slattery may also refer to:

- John Henry Slattery (died 1933), Colorado State Senate
- Waverly Jack Slattery (1904–1983), California State Senate
