= SSMC =

SSMC or sSMC may refer to:

- Sadistic Souls Motorcycle Club, a white-supremacist outlaw motorcycle club founded in 2010
- Satans Slaves Motorcycle Club, an international outlaw motorcycle club founded in Shipley, England in 1966
- Sir Salimullah Medical College, a public medical college in Dhaka, Bangladesh
- Small supernumerary marker chromosome, an abnormal extra chromosome
- Sri Siddhartha Medical College, a medical college and hospital in Tumakuru, Karnataka, India
- Sutter Solano Medical Center a 106-bed general acute care hospital in Vallejo, California, United States
- Systems on Silicon Manufacturing, a Singaporean semiconductor fabrication company located in Pasir Ris Wafer Fab Park
