= Frank Petersen =

Frank Petersen may refer to:

- Frank E. Petersen (1932–2015), first African-American U.S. Marine Corps aviator and general
- Frank S. Petersen (1922–2011), northern California jurist and politician

== See also ==
- Frank Peterson (born 1963), German music producer
