= Albert F. Jones =

American politician (1858–1920)

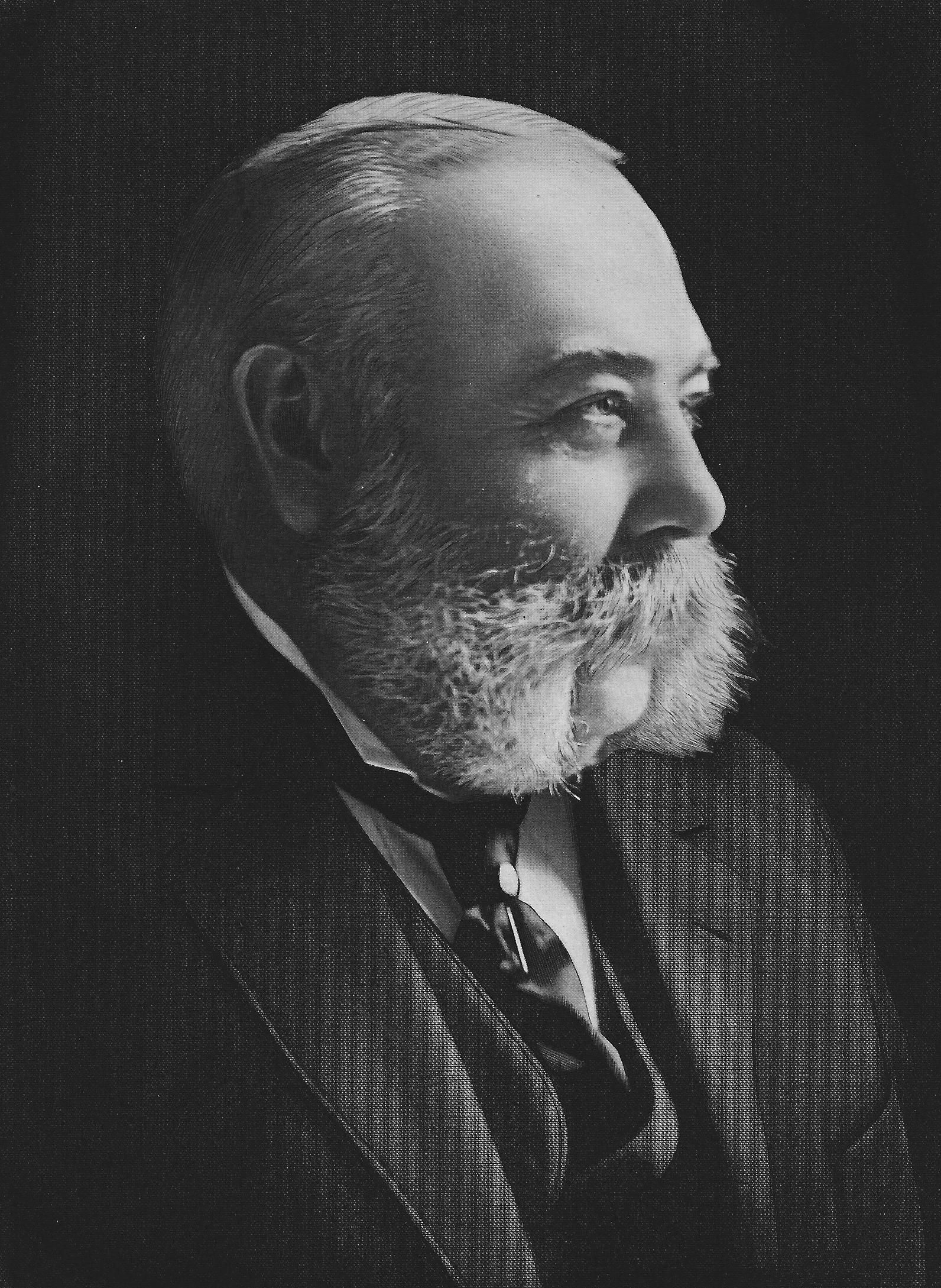

Member of the California Senate from the 4th district
- In office January 3, 1887 – January 5, 1891
- Preceded by: Patrick Reddy
- Succeeded by: Charles L. Pond

Personal details
- Born: February 14, 1858 Colusa County, California, US
- Died: February 15, 1920 (aged 62) Oroville, California, US
- Party: Democratic
- Spouse: May S. Evans (m. 1881)
- Children: 4
- Education: Yale College (LL.B.)
- Occupation: Lawyer

Albert Foster Jones (February 14, 1858 – February 15, 1920) was an American lawyer and Democratic politician who served in the California Senate from 1887 to 1890, for the Fourth district.

== Early life ==
Albert F. Jones was born on February 14, 1858, in Colusa County, California. His father was a native of New Hampshire and his mother of Kentucky. In his early life he clerked in a grocery store at Chico, California. He lived in California all his life and in Butte County, California, for eighteen years. He was District Attorney of Butte county in 1883–1884. He graduated from the law department of Yale College with the degree of Bachelor of Laws in 1879. He was admitted to practice in the Supreme Court of California in August 1879.

On December 21, 1881, he married Miss May S. Evans, of Marysville, California, daughter of O.M. Evans and Jane H. Baldwin, natives of Maine and Connecticut. The Jones had three children: George Foster Jones, Grace Jones Hall, and Albert I. Jones.

== Professional life ==
On March 6, 1880, Jones was appointed Major and Judge Advocate on the staff of Brigadier General Cadwalader commanding the Fifth Brigade.

By profession he was a lawyer. He was Grand Lecturer and President of the Native Sons of the Golden West from 1883–1884. He was elected District Attorney of Butte County.

In 1886, Jones was elected State Senator from the Fourth district, and served two sessions.

== Death ==
Jones died on February 15, 1920, in Oroville, California. Funeral services were on February 18, 1920.
