= Maurice Johannessen =

American politician

K. Maurice Johannessen
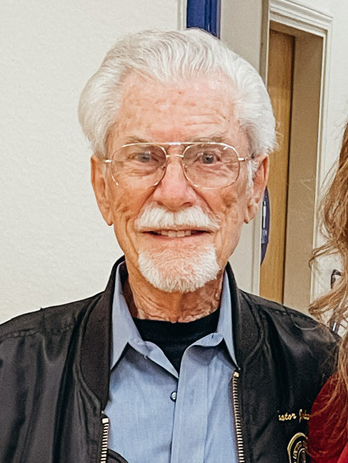
- Johannessen in 2021

Member of the California Senate from the 4th district
- In office November 12, 1993 – November 30, 2002
- Preceded by: Mike Thompson
- Succeeded by: Sam Aanestad

Personal details
- Born: Kaare Maurice Johannessen; July 16, 1934 (age 92) Oslo, Norway
- Party: Republican
- Spouse: Charlotte Field (m. 1953; div. 1972) Marianne Bobinski (m. 1977)
- Children: Steven; Mick; Scott; Sheila

Military service
- Branch/service: United States Army
- Battles/wars: Korean War

Kaare Maurice Johannessen (born July 16, 1934) is an American politician from California and a member of the Republican Party. Johannessen made his living in real estate before being elected to the Redding City Council, where he served as Mayor from 1988 until 1989. In 1990, he won election to the Shasta County Board of Supervisors, serving as its chairman in 1992. He ran for the California State Senate in a 1993 special election for the 4th district left vacant when Democratic incumbent Mike Thompson won election to the neighboring 2nd district (where his home wound up after redistricting). Johannessen defeated former 7th district Assemblywoman Bev Hansen in the August GOP primary by a comfortable margin and went on to win reelection in 1994 and 1998.

Upon leaving the State Senate in 2002, Johannessen was appointed by Democratic Governor Gray Davis as Secretary of the California Department of Veterans Affairs, a post he held until 2003. Johannessen is the father of sons Steven Johannessen, Mark Johannessen and Scott Johannessen and daughter Sheila Cleveland. Johannessen resides in Redding with his wife, Marianne.

Political offices
Preceded by Mike Thompson	California State Senate, 4th District; November 12, 1993 – November 30, 2002	Succeeded by Sam Aanestad
