= Sutter Medical Center =

Sutter Medical Center, Sacramento
- Sutter Health

Geography
- Location: Sacramento, California, United States
- Coordinates: 38.57078°N 121.46955°W

Links
- Website: http://www.suttermedicalcenter.org/
- Lists: Hospitals in California

Sutter Medical Center, Sacramento (SMCS) is a medical center in Sacramento, California, that has been named one of the Top 100 Hospitals in the US for five years, including 2013–2015. It is owned and operated by Sutter Health, a Northern California not-for-profit health system. The center offers both community-based and tertiary medical services. In 2015, the center consolidated its Sutter Memorial Hospital campus in East Sacramento with its midtown Sutter General Hospital location, with the opening of the Anderson Lucchetti Women's and Children's Center and the complete remodeling of Sutter General Hospital into the Ose Adams Medical Pavilion. The midtown location is where Sutter Health's first hospital, Sutter Hospital, opened in 1923. The center also includes Sutter Center for Psychiatry, providing psychiatric, mental health and chemical dependency services since 1958.

== Facilities ==
=== Ose Adams Medical Pavilion ===
The 274-bed specialty medical center focuses on general acute medical/surgical care as well as a medical base to advanced services for cancer, orthopedics, spine and neurology and neurosurgery. Sutter Hospital originally opened on the site of the current Buhler Specialty Pavilion in 1923 as California's largest and most advanced hospital at the time. The hospital was constructed in 1987, went through a complete renovation from 2010 to 2015 while continuing to care for patients, and it was renamed the Ose Adams Medical Pavilion on August 8, 2015. Ose Adams is also the site for Sutter's emergency services, including a children's-only emergency waiting room and department.

The medical pavilion is currently the site for in-patient services of the Sutter Orthopaedic Institute, Sutter Heart & Vascular Institute, Sutter Neuroscience Institute and Sutter Cancer Center.

=== Anderson Lucchetti Women's and Children's Center ===
The Anderson Lucchetti Women's and Children's Center is a 242-bed specialty center for pediatrics and women's services, including the labor of pregnant women and delivery of newborns. The Women's and Children's Center was built as part of the massive expansion of services and opened on August 8, 2015, after patients were moved to the new facility from Sutter Memorial Hospital, where nearly 350,000 babies were born since opening in 1937. The 10-story building is all single-patient rooms, except for the NICU where spaces are built to allow more privacy for families and their infants. At part of the expansion, NFL Hall of Fame member Steve Young donated $150,000 to open a music therapy center called Sophie's Place, in honor of Sophie Barton. The center treats children aged 0–21 and adult women.

=== Sutter General Hospital at 28th and L streets ===
The 346-bed specialty medical center focused on cardiovascular services, transplants and women's and children's specialty services. Sutter General Hospital opened to the community in 1937 as Sutter Maternity Hospital. Sutter General Hospital was known as "Sacramento's Baby Hospital" and has been the birthplace of nearly 350,000 babies (more than any other facility in the Sacramento region). The hospital expanded when the Anderson Lucchetti Women's and Children's Center opened on August 8, 2015.

Sutter Memorial Hospital is at 51st and F streets in East Sacramento. Sutter Memorial first opened its doors for maternity care in 1937. It closed in 2015 after relocating to its new flagship medical center in midtown Sacramento. More than 348,000 babies were born at Sutter Memorial before it closed its doors.

=== Sutter Center for Psychiatry at 7700 Folsom Blvd. ===
The 75-bed facility provides inpatient and outpatient psychiatric, mental health and chemical dependency services to children, adolescents and adults. Sutter Center for Psychiatry is the leader in providing psychiatric and mental health services in the Sacramento area, including:

- Adult, adolescent and child inpatient services including family education and support, individual and group therapy, chaplaincy services, psychological testing, recreational therapy, music therapy, movement therapy and chemical dependency assessment
- Structured child and adolescent partial hospitalization services
- Interventional psychiatry including electroconvulsive therapy and vagus nerve stimulation therapy

Education and support services including bereavement outreach, bipolar support group, National Alliance for the Mentally Ill and Child Attention Deficit Disorder

- 24-hour central intake center
- Outpatient counseling services for children and youth through Sutter Counseling Center

== Expansion ==
SMCS underwent a major expansion to relocate all major services to one advanced medical campus. The new campus features the new Anderson Lucchetti Women's and Children's Center, a 242-bed, 10-story building. It has a helistop on the roof just off Capital City Freeway, which allows helicopters to transport severely injured and sick patients for treatment, mostly newborn and pediatric patients.

Now fully renovated, Sutter General Hospital has been renamed the Ose Adams Medical Pavilion – a five-story, 257-bed facility that includes 24 operating rooms, two new cardiac cath laboratories, two new electrophysiology laboratories, five angiography rooms, 106 recovery beds, state-of-the-art digital Imaging Department, emergency services expansion with larger waiting areas, more treatment rooms, and dedicated CT scanner and other imaging equipment, and the addition of a children-only emergency room, and the new home of Sutter Heart and Vascular Institute, in addition to tertiary services including orthopedics, neuroscience, bariatrics and oncology.

In spring 2010, Sutter opened Sutter Capitol Pavilion within the midtown medical campus. Sutter Capitol Pavilion has medical offices and outpatient services, including diagnostic imaging, outpatient surgery and recovery facilities. It includes a six-room outpatient surgery suite, 40 recovery beds and non-invasive cardiology and medical offices, and valet services for patients.
