= Barry Keene =

American politician (born 1938)

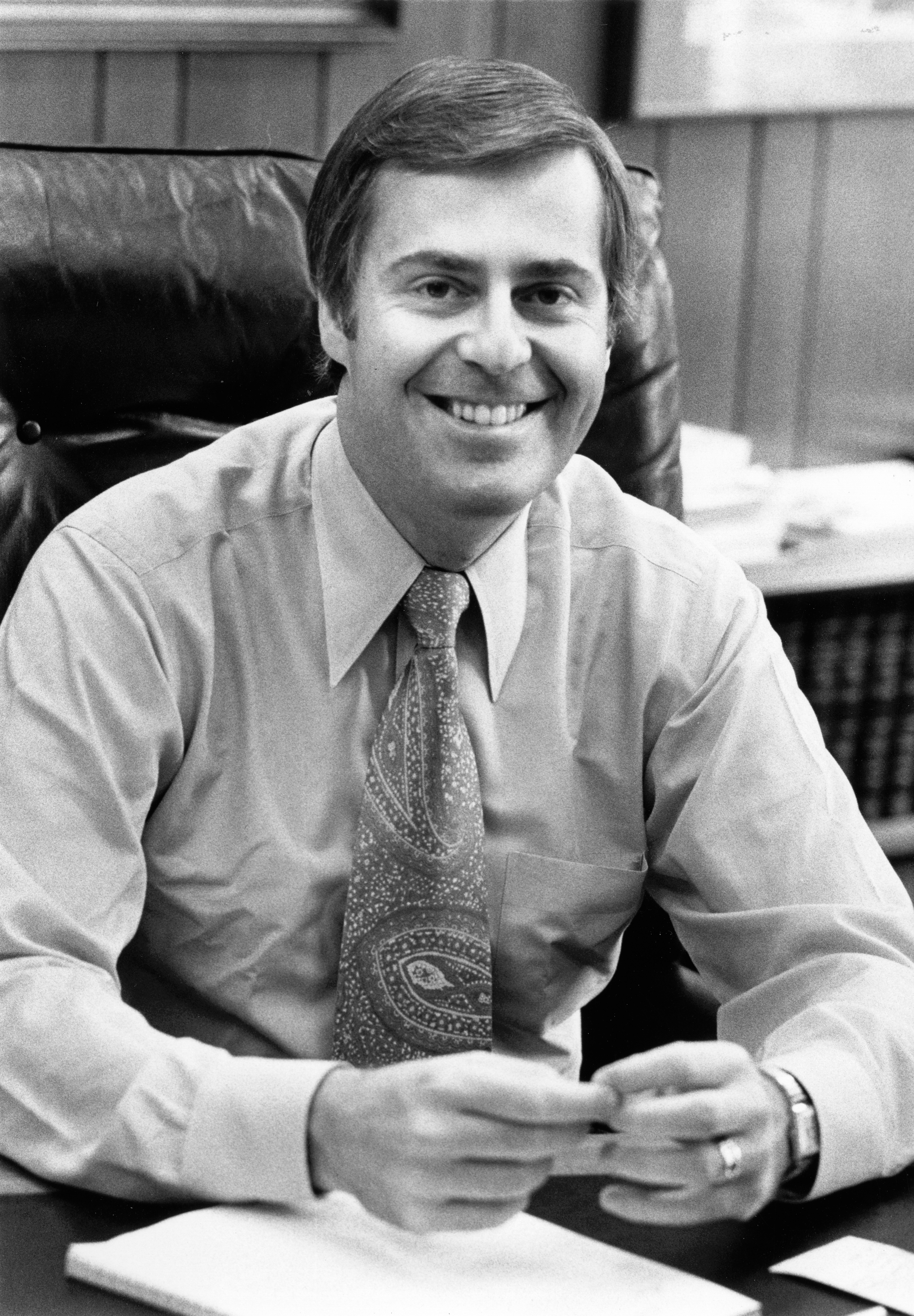
- Keene c. 1978

Director of the California Department of General Services
- In office May 19, 2000 – April 26, 2002
- Appointed by: Gray Davis
- Preceded by: Cliff Allenby
- Succeeded by: Clothilde Hewlett

Majority Leader of the California Senate
- In office December 3, 1984 – December 15, 1992
- Preceded by: John Garamendi
- Succeeded by: Henry J. Mello

Member of the California Senate from the 2nd district
- In office December 4, 1978 – December 15, 1992
- Preceded by: Peter H. Behr
- Succeeded by: Mike Thompson

Member of the California State Assembly from the 2nd district
- In office January 1, 1973 – December 4, 1978
- Preceded by: Frank P. Belotti
- Succeeded by: Douglas H. Bosco

Personal details
- Born: July 30, 1938 (age 87) Atlantic City, New Jersey, U.S.
- Party: Democratic
- Spouse: Lucie Marie Keene
- Education: Stanford University

Barry Dion Keene (born July 30, 1938) is an American lawyer and politician who served in the California State Assembly from 1973 to 1978 and the California State Senate from 1978 to 1992. He served as majority leader of the latter body from 1984 to 1992.

== Early career ==
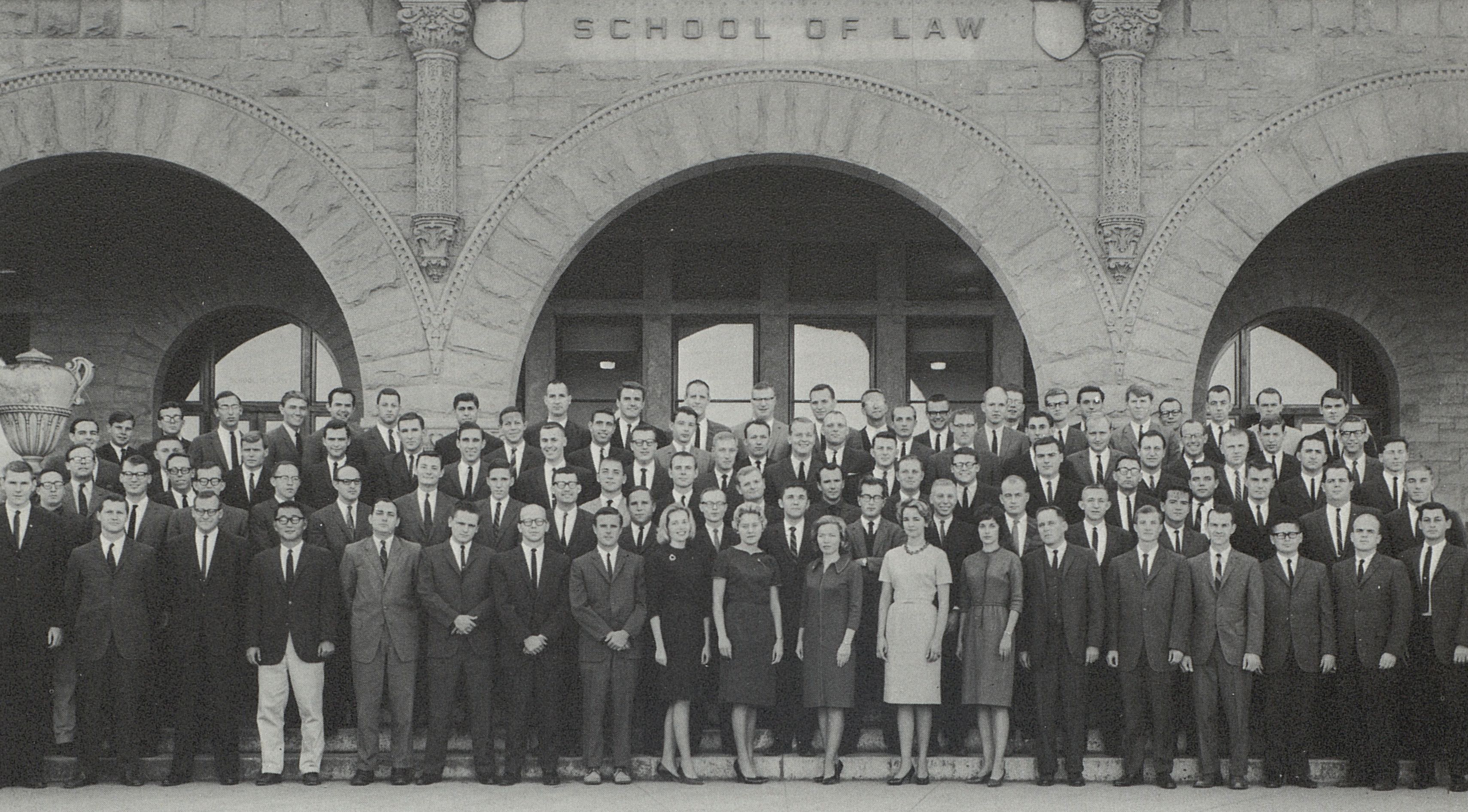
Keene (third row from top, seventh from left) with other members of graduating class of Stanford Law School, 1964

A native of Atlantic City, New Jersey, Keene earned his Bachelor of Arts degree from Stanford University in 1962 and his law degree from Stanford Law School in 1964. He became a member of the California Bar in 1965, and accepted a position as a Sonoma County deputy district attorney in 1968. The next year, he won his first election to public office, to the Rincon Valley School Board.

== California Legislature ==
In 1970 Keene won the Democratic nomination for the 2nd District in the California State Assembly, which included the counties of Del Norte, Humboldt, Lake and Mendocino, and a portion of Sonoma County. In the general election he tried to unseat longtime Republican Assemblyman Frank P. Belotti, but lost narrowly. Keene successfully ran again for the Assembly in 1972 following the death of Belotti.

Keene served six years in the Assembly, holding leadership positions as chairman of the Elections and Reapportionment Committee and later as chairman of the Health Committee. In 1978 Keene was urged to run for a seat in the California State Senate, left open by the retirement of Republican Senator Peter H. Behr. The 2nd Senate District included the 2nd Assembly District and all of Marin County, spanning over one-third of the entire California coastline, from the Golden Gate Bridge to the Oregon border.

Keene won the 1978 election and was re-elected to the Senate in 1982, 1986 and 1990. He held several powerful positions in the Senate, including chairing the Judiciary Committee and serving as Majority Leader, until his resignation on December 15, 1992. During his tenure as a state legislator, Keene worked on:

- The Natural Death Act, the world's first right-to-die law;
- The Bagley-Keene Open Meeting Act, which requires meetings of state boards and commissions to follow rules similar to those governing local governments under the Ralph M.Brown Act;
- The Medical Injury Compensation Reform Act (MICRA), the United States' first comprehensive medical malpractice reform statute;
- A bill to use state legal powers to try to block the Navy from scuttling decommissioned but still radioactive nuclear submarines off California's North Coast. The bill was part of a campaign that resulted in congressional action blocking the scuttling
- The Durable Power of Attorney for Health Care Act, allowing Californians to designate trusted persons to make their health care decisions when they become unable to; and
- The Lempert-Keene-Seastrand Oil Spill Prevention and Response Act of 1990.

Upon leaving the legislature, Keene taught politics at California State University Sacramento, the University of California, Berkeley, and Stanford University. In 2000, he was appointed by Governor Gray Davis as director of the California Department of General Services. In 2008 he was appointed to the California Student Aid Commission.

== Sources ==
- Hicke, Carole (1994). "Oral History Interview with Barry Keene". archive.org. Berkeley: University of California, Berkeley.
