= Sutter Delta Medical Center =

- Sutter Health
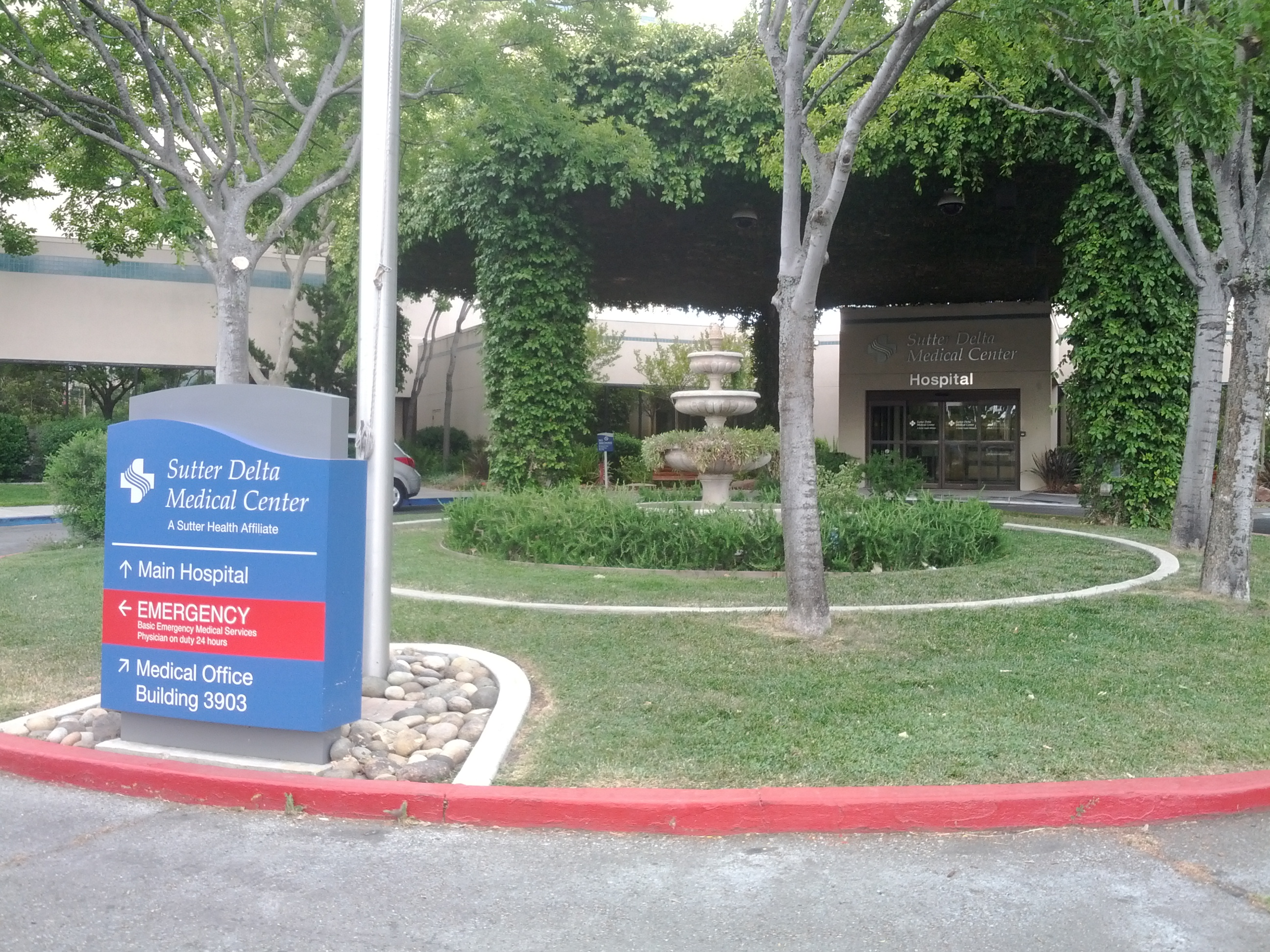
- Sutter Delta Medical Center entrance, Antioch, CA May 2013

Geography
- Location: 3901 Lone Tree Way Antioch, CA 94509, California, United States
- Coordinates: 37.9821443°N 121.8027333°W

Organization
- Type: Teaching

Services
- Emergency department: Level II trauma center
- Beds: 145

History
- Founded: 1927

Links
- Website: https://www.sutterhealth.org/delta
- Lists: Hospitals in California

Sutter Delta Medical Center is a 145-bed general medical/surgical hospital in Antioch, California. A Level II Trauma Center, Sutter Delta is a not-for-profit teaching hospital and is ranked as a High Performing hospital for COPD and heart failure. It is part of Sutter Health.

Originally founded as Antioch Hospital in 1927, it became Delta Memorial Hospital in the 1960s and joined Sutter Health in 1990.

== See also ==
- List of hospitals in California
