= Memorial Medical Center (Modesto, California) =

- Sutter Health

Geography
- Location: 1700 Coffee Road, Modesto, California, United States
- Coordinates: 37.66864°N 120.97452°W

Organization
- Care system: Private & Other
- Type: Public
- Affiliated university: Sutter Health Network

Services
- Standards: Joint Commission
- Emergency department: Level II trauma center
- Beds: 423

History
- Founded: May 1, 1970 - Hospital remodeled in 2000

Links
- Website: http://www.memorialmedicalcenter.org/
- Lists: Hospitals in California

Memorial Medical Center is a hospital in the greater Stanislaus County, California, United States. It is licensed for 423 acute care beds and is affiliated with Sutter Health, a not-for-profit association of medical service providers. The main directions of the Memorial Medical Center are cardiac care, cancer treatment, orthopedics, obstetrics, and newborn intensive care.

The hospital was founded on May 1, 1970 and at the time had 99 beds. It has been affiliated with Sutter Health since 1996. In 2021, Memorial Medical Center received the prestigious Lantern Award from Emergency Nursing Association. Memorial was one of thirty-three facilities to receive the award nationally.

In 2026, Sutter Health broke ground on a $380 million Advanced Cancer Center and Care Complex on the Memorial Medical Center campus. The four-story, 165,000-square-foot facility, developed in partnership with Gould Medical Group, is expected to open in 2028 or 2029. Planned services include clinic visits, infusion and radiation therapy, imaging, and clinical trials, along with an ambulatory surgery center featuring four operating rooms and outpatient clinics with 50 exam rooms. The facility is expected to support an estimated 120 physicians and 400 staff once fully operational.
