= Pearce Young =

American politician

Member of the California State Assembly from the 5th district
- In office January 7, 1963 – December 19, 1966
- Preceded by: Robert L. Leggett
- Succeeded by: John F. Dunlap

Personal details
- Born: December 24, 1918 Modesto, California, U.S.
- Died: 1984 (aged 65–66) Los Angeles, California, U.S.
- Party: Democratic

Military service
- Allegiance: United States
- Branch/service: United States Army
- Battles/wars: World War II

Pearce Young (December 24, 1918 - July 1984) served in the California State Assembly for the 5th district and during World War II he served in the United States Army.
