= John F. Dunlap =

American politician (1922–2022)

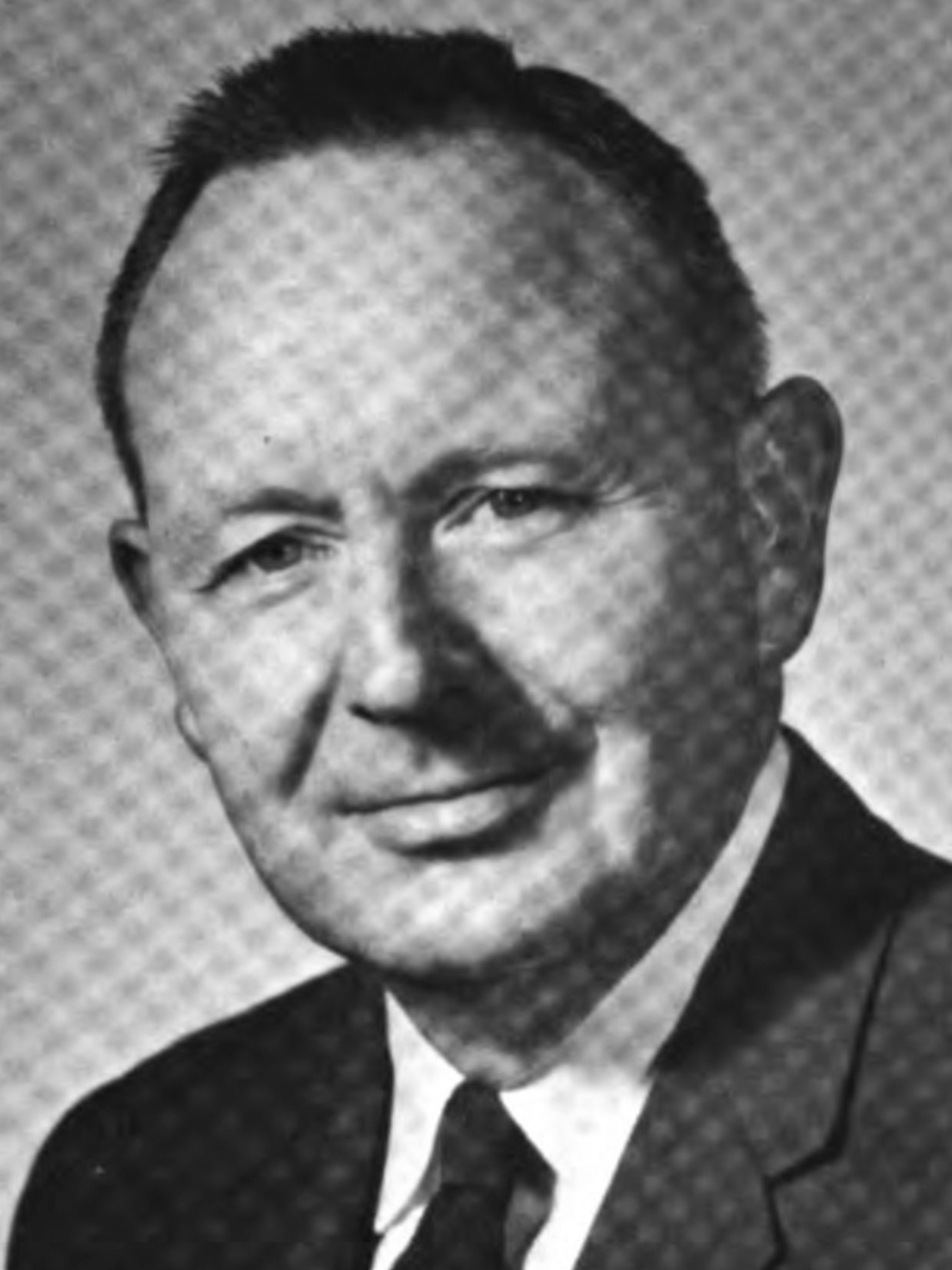
- Official portrait, 1967

Member of the California Senate from the 4th district
- In office December 2, 1974 – November 30, 1978
- Preceded by: Peter H. Behr
- Succeeded by: Jim Nielsen

Member of the California State Assembly from the 5th district
- In office January 2, 1967 – November 30, 1974
- Preceded by: Pearce Young
- Succeeded by: Eugene T. Gualco

Personal details
- Born: September 11, 1922 San Jose, California, U.S.
- Died: March 7, 2022 (aged 99) Napa, California, U.S.
- Party: Democratic
- Spouse: Janet L. Jack (m. 1946)
- Children: 4
- Relatives: Nathan Coombs (great-grandfather); Frank Coombs (grandfather)

Military service
- Branch/service: United States Army
- Battles/wars: World War II

John F. Dunlap (September 11, 1922 – March 7, 2022) was an American politician who served in the California legislature in the Assembly from 1967 to 1974 and in the Senate from 1974 to 1978. He was defeated for re-election by Jim Nielsen. During World War II he served in the United States Army. He died at his home in Napa, California, on March 7, 2022, at the age of 99.
