= Robert Leggett =

American politician

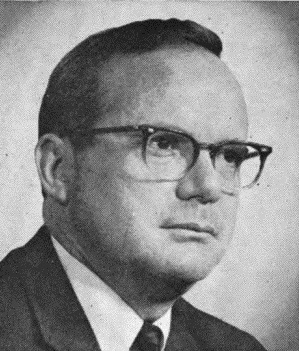

Member of the U.S. House of Representatives from California's 4th district
- In office January 3, 1963 – January 3, 1979
- Preceded by: New district (redistricting)
- Succeeded by: Vic Fazio

Member of the California State Assembly from the 5th district
- In office January 2, 1961 – January 3, 1963
- Preceded by: Samuel R. Geddes
- Succeeded by: Pearce Young

Personal details
- Born: July 26, 1926 Richmond, California, U.S.
- Died: August 13, 1997 (aged 71) Orange, California, U.S.
- Party: Democratic
- Spouse: Barbara Burnett (after 1947)
- Children: 3
- Education: University of California, Berkeley; University of California's Boalt Hall School of Jurisprudence

Military service
- Allegiance: United States
- Branch/service: United States Navy
- Years of service: 1944-1946
- Battles/wars: World War II

Robert Louis Leggett (July 26, 1926 – August 13, 1997) was an American lawyer and politician who served eight terms as a U.S. representative from California from 1963 to 1979.

== Early life ==
Born in Richmond, California, Leggett attended the public schools there. He served as an enlisted man in the United States Naval Air Corps from 1944 to 1946.

He graduated from the University of California, Berkeley with a B.A. in 1947, and the University of California's Boalt Hall School of Jurisprudence with a J.D. in 1950. He was admitted to the bar in 1951 and began the practice of law in Vallejo, California. He served as member of the California State Assembly in 1960 and 1962.

== Congressional career ==
Leggett was elected as a Democrat to the 88th and to the eight following Congresses, serving from January 3, 1963, to January 3, 1979. He served on the House Armed Services Committee and opposed the Vietnam War. He also was an early environmentalist.

In the 1970s, he began an affair with Suzi Park Thomson, an aide to Speaker of the House Carl Albert. Thomson, who was born in Korea, frequently entertained diplomats and intelligence officials from the South Korean Embassy. In 1976, as part of investigations related to Koreagate, the Federal Bureau of Investigation and Internal Revenue Service contended that Leggett may have passed information to Korean officials or received favors from them. Leggett strongly denied the accusations and retired from Congress in 1979. He and Thomson married in 1981.

Leggett died August 13, 1997, in Orange, California, aged 71.

== See also ==
- List of federal political sex scandals in the United States

U.S. House of Representatives
Preceded by William S. Mailliard	Member of the U.S. House of Representatives from California's 4th congressional district 1963–1979	Succeeded by Vic Fazio
