= California's 4th senatorial district =

American legislative district

California's 4th State Senate district
Current senator
Marie Alvarado-Gil; R–Jackson
- Population (2010) • Voting age • Citizen voting age: 937,962; 702,185; 622,033
- Demographics: 65.92% White; 3.78% Black; 19.73% Latino; 6.98% Asian; 2.18% Native American; 0.46% Hawaiian/Pacific Islander; 0.24% other; 0.70% remainder of multiracial
- Registered voters: 528,784
- Registration: 37.27% Republican; 33.88% Democratic; 21.38% No party preference

California's 4th senatorial district is one of 40 California State Senate districts. It is currently represented by Marie Alvarado-Gil of Jackson.

== District profile ==
The district encompasses the northeastern portion of the Central Valley, along with the central Sierra Nevada and all of Death Valley. It includes Stanislaus, Calaveras, Amador, El Dorado, Alpine, Tuolumne, Mariposa, Madera, Mono, and Inyo Counties, and parts of Madera, Merced, Placer, and Nevada Counties.

== Election results from statewide races ==
Year	Office	Results
2022	Governor	Dahle 59.8 – 40.2%
2022	Senator	Meuser 57.0 – 43.0%
2021	Recall	Yes 59.5 – 40.5%
2020	President	Trump 51.4 – 46.0%
2018	Governor	Cox 56.7 – 43.3%
2018	Senator	De Leon 56.1 – 43.9%
2016	President	Trump 50.4 – 42.4%
2016	Senator	Harris 60.0 – 40.0%
2014	Governor	Kashkari 52.4 – 47.6%
2012	President	Romney 52.6 – 44.4%
2012	Senator	Emken 53.3 – 46.7%

Election results from statewide races
Year	Office	Results
2002	Governor	Simon 57.6 - 21.5%
2000	President	Bush 53.0 - 42.0%
2000	Senator	Feinstein 47.3 - 44.8%
1998	Governor	Davis 51.8 - 44.6%
1998	Senator	Fong 56.3 - 39.5%
1996	President	Dole 45.1 - 43.4%
1994	Governor	Wilson 60.6 - 33.8%
1994	Senator	Huffington 52.7 - 38.4%
1992	President	Clinton 40.1 - 35.9%
1992	Senator	Herschensohn 47.4 - 41.1%
1992	Senator	Feinstein 48.1 - 42.6%

== List of senators representing the district ==
Due to redistricting, the 4th district has been moved around different parts of the state. The current iteration resulted from the 2021 redistricting by the California Citizens Redistricting Commission.

Senators	Party	Years served	Electoral history	Counties represented
Selim E. Woodworth (Monterey)	Nonpartisan	January 6, 1851 – January 5, 1852	Redistricted from the Monterey district and re-elected in 1850. [data missing]	Monterey, Santa Cruz
Philip A. Roach (Monterey)	Democratic	January 5, 1852 – January 2, 1854	Elected in 1851. [data missing]	Monterey, Santa Cruz
B. C. Whiting (Santa Cruz)	Democratic	January 2, 1854 – January 1, 1855	Elected in 1853. Retired to run for Attorney General.	Monterey, Santa Cruz
Sherman Day (Berkeley)	Democratic	January 1, 1855 – January 5, 1857	Elected in 1854. [data missing]	Alameda, Santa Clara
Samuel B. Bell (Alameda)	Republican	January 5, 1857 – January 3, 1859	Elected in 1856. [data missing]	Alameda, Santa Clara
R. A. Redman (Oakland)	Democratic	January 3, 1859 – January 7, 1861	Elected in 1858. [data missing]	Alameda, Santa Clara
Augustus Rhodes (San Jose)	Republican	January 7, 1861 – January 6, 1862	Elected in 1860. [data missing]	Alameda, Santa Clara
Augustus Rhodes (San Jose)	Republican	January 7, 1861 – January 6, 1862	Elected in 1860. [data missing]	Santa Clara
Thomas Baker (Tulare)	Democratic	January 6, 1862 – December 7, 1863	Elected in 1861. [data missing]	Fresno, Tulare
J. W. Freeman (Bakersfield)	Democratic	December 7, 1863 – December 6, 1869	Elected in 1863. Re-elected in 1865. Re-elected in 1867. [data missing]	Fresno, Kern, Tulare
Thomas Fowler (Visalia)	Democratic	December 6, 1869 – December 1, 1873	Elected in 1868. [data missing]	Fresno, Kern, Tulare
Tipton Lindsey (Visalia)	Independent	December 1, 1873 – December 6, 1875	Elected in 1873. [data missing]	Fresno, Kern, Tulare
W. A. Eakin (Sonora)	Democratic	December 6, 1875 – December 3, 1877	Redistricted from the 12th district and re-elected in 1875. [data missing]	Inyo, Mono, Tuolumne
Thomas Fowler (Visalia)	Democratic	December 3, 1877 – January 5, 1880	Elected in 1877. [data missing]	Fresno, Inyo, Kern, Mono, Tulare
Chester Rowell (Fresno)	Republican	January 5, 1880 – January 8, 1883	Elected in 1879. [data missing]	Fresno, Inyo, Kern, Mono, Tulare
Chester Rowell (Fresno)	Republican	January 5, 1880 – January 8, 1883	Elected in 1879. [data missing]	Fresno, Madera
Chester Rowell (Fresno)	Republican	January 5, 1880 – January 8, 1883	Elected in 1879. [data missing]	Fresno
Patrick Reddy (Bodie)	Democratic	January 8, 1883 – January 3, 1887	Elected in 1882. [data missing]	Fresno, Inyo, Kern, Mono, Tulare
Albert F. Jones (Oroville)	Democratic	January 3, 1887 – January 5, 1891	Elected in 1886. [data missing]	Butte
Vacant		January 5, 1891 – January 20, 1891	Senator-elect Charles L. Pond (R–Nord) died of pneumonia on November 30, 1890.	Butte
Wanton A. Shippee (Oroville)	Republican	January 20, 1891 – January 2, 1899	Elected to finish vacant term. Re-elected in 1894. [data missing]	Butte
Wanton A. Shippee (Oroville)	Republican	January 20, 1891 – January 2, 1899	Elected to finish vacant term. Re-elected in 1894. [data missing]	Butte, Tehama
W. F. Maggard (Corning)	Republican	January 2, 1899 – January 5, 1903	Elected in 1888. [data missing]	Butte, Tehama
John B. Sanford (Ukiah)	Democratic	January 5, 1903 – January 7, 1907	Elected in 1902. Lost re-election.	Colusa, Glenn, Lake, Mendocino
C. M. Hammond (Upper Lake)	Republican	January 7, 1907 – January 2, 1911	Elected in 1906. [data missing]	Colusa, Glenn, Lake, Mendocino
John B. Sanford (Ukiah)	Democratic	January 2, 1911 – January 4, 1915	Elected in 1910. [data missing]	Colusa, Glenn, Lake, Mendocino
Claude F. Purkitt (Willows)	Democratic	January 4, 1915 – January 8, 1923	Elected in 1914. Re-elected in 1918. [data missing]	Colusa, Glenn, Lake, Mendocino
Fred C. Handy (Ukiah)	Republican	January 8, 1923 – September 23, 1930	Elected in 1922. Re-elected in 1926. Died.	Colusa, Glenn, Lake, Mendocino
Vacant		September 23, 1930 – January 5, 1931		Colusa, Glenn, Lake, Mendocino
R. R. Ingels (Potter Valley)	Republican	January 5, 1931 – January 7, 1935	Elected in 1930. [data missing]	Lake, Mendocino
George M. Biggar (Covelo)	Republican	January 7, 1935 – January 6, 1947	Elected in 1934. Re-elected in 1938. Re-elected in 1942. [data missing]	Lake, Mendocino
Burt W. Busch (Lakeport)	Republican	January 6, 1947 – January 3, 1955	Elected in 1946. Re-elected in 1950. Retired.	Lake, Mendocino
James E. Busch (Ukiah)	Republican	January 3, 1955 – January 5, 1959	Elected in 1954. Lost re-election.	Lake, Mendocino
Waverly J. Slattery (Finley)	Democratic	January 5, 1959 – January 7, 1963	Elected in 1958. Retired.	Lake, Mendocino
Frank S. Petersen (Fort Bragg)	Democratic	January 7, 1963 – January 2, 1967	Elected in 1962. Retired to become a Justice of the Del Norte County Superior Court.	Lake, Mendocino
John F. McCarthy (San Rafael)	Republican	January 2, 1967 – January 4, 1971	Redistricted from the 13th district and re-elected in 1966. [data missing]	Marin, Napa, Solano
Peter H. Behr (San Rafael)	Republican	January 2, 1971 – November 30, 1974	Elected in 1970. Redistricted to the 2nd district.	Marin, Napa, Solano
John F. Dunlap (Napa)	Democratic	December 2, 1974 – November 30, 1978	Redistricted from the 5th district and re-elected in 1974. Lost re-election.	Napa, Sacramento, Solano, Sonoma, Yolo
Jim Nielsen (Woodland)	Republican	December 4, 1978 – November 30, 1990	Elected in 1978. Re-elected in 1982. Re-elected in 1986. Lost re-election.	Napa, Sacramento, Solano, Sonoma, Yolo
Jim Nielsen (Woodland)	Republican	December 4, 1978 – November 30, 1990	Elected in 1978. Re-elected in 1982. Re-elected in 1986. Lost re-election.	Butte, Colusa, Glenn, Lake, Napa, Shasta, Sonoma, Tehama, Trinity, Yolo
Mike Thompson (St. Helena)	Democratic	December 3, 1990 – May 20, 1993	Elected in 1990. Resigned after being elected to the 2nd district.	Butte, Colusa, Glenn, Lake, Napa, Shasta, Sonoma, Tehama
Vacant		May 20, 1993 – November 12, 1993		Butte, Colusa, Glenn, Lake, Napa, Shasta, Sonoma, Tehama
Maurice Johannessen (Redding)	Republican	November 12, 1993 – November 30, 2002	Elected to finish Thompson's term. Re-elected in 1994. Re-elected in 1998. Retired due to term limits.	Butte, Colusa, Glenn, Lake, Napa, Shasta, Sonoma, Tehama
Maurice Johannessen (Redding)	Republican	November 12, 1993 – November 30, 2002	Elected to finish Thompson's term. Re-elected in 1994. Re-elected in 1998. Retired due to term limits.	Butte, Colusa, Glenn, Sacramento, Shasta, Siskiyou, Solano, Sutter, Tehama, Trinity
Sam Aanestad (Grass Valley)	Republican	December 2, 2002 – November 30, 2010	Elected in 2002. Re-elected in 2006. Retired due to term limits.	Butte, Colusa, Del Norte, Glenn, Nevada, Placer, Shasta, Siskiyou, Sutter, Tehama, Trinity, Yuba
Doug LaMalfa (Oroville)	Republican	December 6, 2010 – September 1, 2012	Elected in 2010. Resigned to run for U.S. House of Representatives.	Butte, Colusa, Del Norte, Glenn, Nevada, Placer, Shasta, Siskiyou, Sutter, Tehama, Trinity, Yuba
Vacant		September 1, 2012 – January 10, 2013		Butte, Colusa, Del Norte, Glenn, Nevada, Placer, Shasta, Siskiyou, Sutter, Tehama, Trinity, Yuba
Jim Nielsen (Red Bluff)	Republican	January 10, 2013 – November 30, 2022	Elected to finish LaMalfa's term. Re-elected in 2014. Re-elected in 2018. Redistricted to the 1st district and retired due to term limits.	Butte, Colusa, Del Norte, Glenn, Nevada, Placer, Shasta, Siskiyou, Sutter, Tehama, Trinity, Yuba
Jim Nielsen (Red Bluff)	Republican	January 10, 2013 – November 30, 2022	Elected to finish LaMalfa's term. Re-elected in 2014. Re-elected in 2018. Redistricted to the 1st district and retired due to term limits.	Butte, Colusa, Glenn, Placer, Sacramento, Sutter, Tehama, Yuba
Marie Alvarado-Gil (Jackson)	Democratic	December 5, 2022 – August 8, 2024	Elected in 2022. Lost re-election.	Alpine, Amador, Calaveras, El Dorado, Inyo, Madera, Mariposa, Merced, Mono, Nevada, Placer, Stanislaus, Tuolumne
Marie Alvarado-Gil (Jackson)	Republican	August 8, 2024 – present	Elected in 2022. Lost re-election.	Alpine, Amador, Calaveras, El Dorado, Inyo, Madera, Mariposa, Merced, Mono, Nevada, Placer, Stanislaus, Tuolumne

== Election results (1990-present) ==
=== 2022 ===
2022 California State Senate 4th district election
Primary election
Party	Candidate	Votes	%
Democratic	Tim Robertson	48,880	22.1
Democratic	Marie Alvarado-Gil	41,262	18.7
Republican	George Radanovich	37,793	17.1
Republican	Steven Bailey	37,129	16.8
Republican	Jeff McKay	34,773	15.7
Republican	Jack Griffith	10,337	4.7
Republican	Michael Gordon	6,202	2.8
Republican	Jolene Daly	4,652	2.1
Total votes		221,028	100.0
General election
Democratic	Marie Alvarado-Gil	137,157	52.7
Democratic	Tim Robertson	123,210	47.3
Total votes		260,367	100.0
Democratic gain from Republican			

=== 2018 ===
2018 California State Senate 4th district election
Primary election
Party	Candidate	Votes	%
Republican	Jim Nielsen (incumbent)	118,756	60.3
Democratic	Phillip Kim	42,661	21.7
Democratic	Michael "Mike" Worley	35,472	18.0
Total votes		192,889	100.0
General election
Republican	Jim Nielsen (incumbent)	190,441	57.1
Democratic	Phillip Kim	142,817	42.9
Total votes		333,258	100.0
Republican hold			

=== 2014 ===
2014 California State Senate 4th district election
Primary election
Party	Candidate	Votes	%
Republican	Jim Nielsen (incumbent)	92,191	64.0
Democratic	CJ Jawahar	51,781	36.0
Total votes		143,972	100.0
General election
Republican	Jim Nielsen (incumbent)	139,199	63.7
Democratic	CJ Jawahar	79,457	36.3
Total votes		218,656	100.0
Republican hold			

=== 2013 (special) ===
2013 California State Senate 4th district special election Vacancy resulting from the resignation of Doug LaMalfa
Primary election
Party	Candidate	Votes	%
Republican	Jim Nielsen	188,207	49.8
Democratic	Michael "Mickey" Harrington	104,572	27.7
Republican	Dan Logue	43,303	11.5
No party preference	Jann Reed	24,966	6.6
No party preference	Dan Levine	9,882	2.6
No party preference	Benjamin "Ben" Emery	7,146	1.9
Total votes		378,076	100.0
General election
Republican	Jim Nielsen	97,849	66.6
Democratic	Michael "Mickey" Harrington	49,004	33.4
Total votes		146,853	100.0
Republican hold			

=== 2010 ===
2010 California State Senate 4th district election
Party	Candidate	Votes	%
Republican	Doug LaMalfa	226,239	68.3
Democratic	Lathe Gill	105,460	31.7
Total votes		331,699	100.0
Republican hold			

=== 2006 ===
2006 California State Senate 4th district election
Party	Candidate	Votes	%
Republican	Sam Aanestad (incumbent)	182,494	61.0
Democratic	Paul R. Singh	99,293	33.1
Libertarian	Tony Munroe	9,300	3.1
Green	Robert Wells Vizzard	8,520	2.8
Total votes		299,607	100.0
Republican hold			

=== 2002 ===
2002 California State Senate 4th district election
Party	Candidate	Votes	%
Republican	Sam Aanestad	148,023	58.1
Democratic	Marianne Smith	92,786	36.3
Libertarian	Robert H. Underwood	14,325	5.6
Total votes		255,134	100.0
Republican hold			

=== 1998 ===
1998 California State Senate 4th district election
Party	Candidate	Votes	%
Republican	Maurice Johannessen (incumbent)	135,528	56.7
Democratic	Mark Desio	103,620	43.3
Total votes		239,148	100.0
Republican hold			

=== 1994 ===
1994 California State Senate 4th district election
Party	Candidate	Votes	%
Republican	Maurice Johannessen (incumbent)	133,101	54.4
Democratic	Michael H. McGowan	111,667	45.6
Total votes		244,768	100.0
Republican hold			

=== 1993 (special) ===
1993 California State Senate 4th district special election Vacancy resulting from the resignation of Mike Thompson
Party	Candidate	Votes	%
Republican	Maurice Johannessen	108,982	55.7
Democratic	Montana Podva	76,509	39.1
Peace and Freedom	Irv Sutley	10,051	5.1
Total votes		195,542	100.0
Republican gain from Democratic			

=== 1990 ===
1990 California State Senate 4th district election
Party	Candidate	Votes	%
Democratic	Mike Thompson	125,573	47.7
Republican	Jim Nelson (incumbent)	123,066	46.7
Libertarian	Juanita A. Henricks	9,398	3.6
Peace and Freedom	Irv Sutley	5,381	2.0
Total votes		263,418	100.0
Democratic gain from Republican			

== See also ==
- California State Senate
- California State Senate districts
- Districts in California
