= Mike Thompson =

American politician (born 1951)

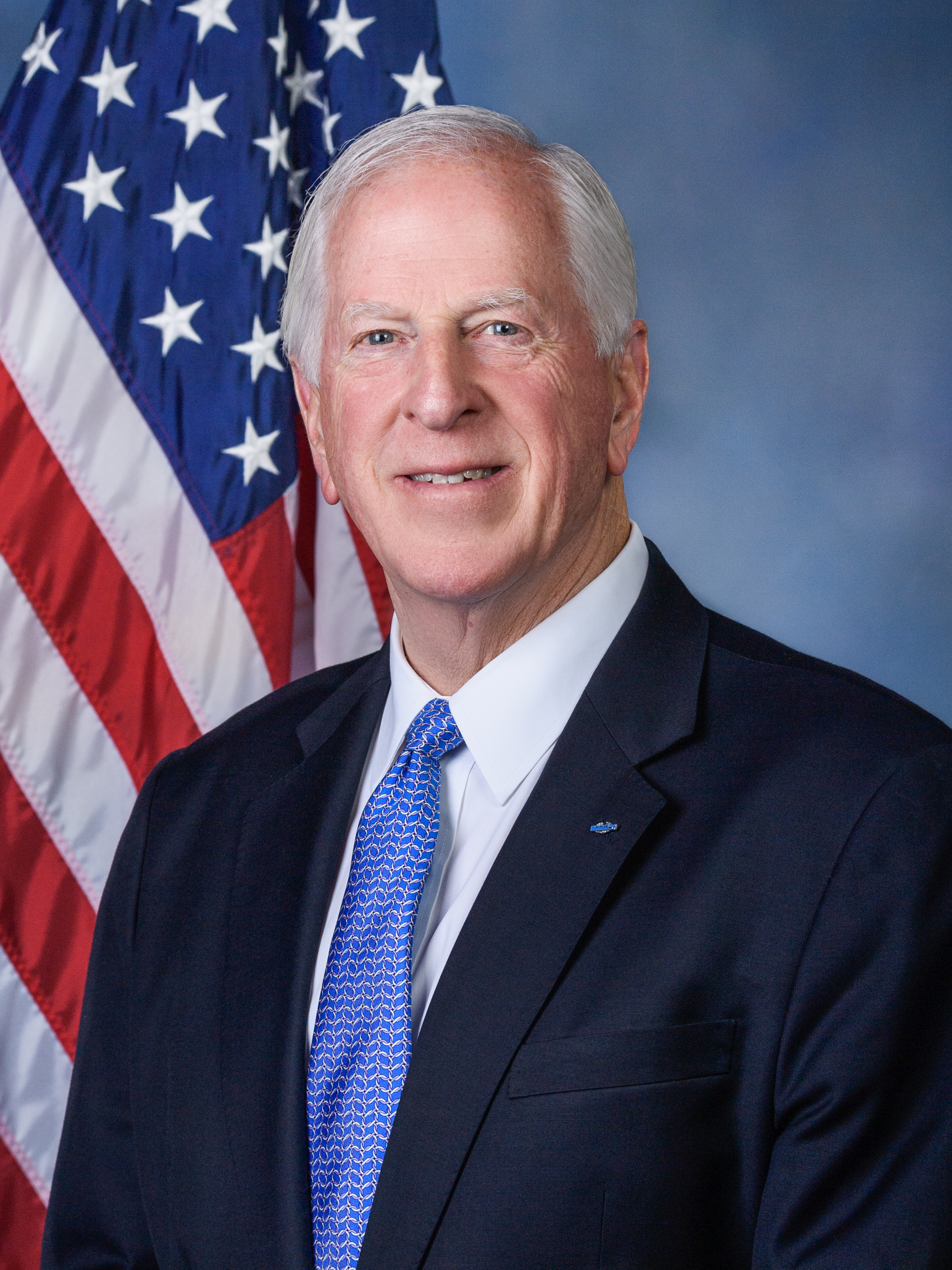
- Official portrait, 2019

Member of the U.S. House of Representatives from California
- Incumbent
- Assumed office January 3, 1999
- Preceded by: Frank Riggs
- Constituency: 1st district (1999–2013); 5th district (2013–2023); 4th district (2023–present)

Member of the California State Senate from the 2nd district
- In office May 20, 1993 – November 30, 1998
- Preceded by: Barry Keene
- Succeeded by: Wesley Chesbro

Member of the California State Senate from the 4th district
- In office December 3, 1990 – May 20, 1993
- Preceded by: Jim Nielsen
- Succeeded by: Maurice Johannessen

Personal details
- Born: Charles Michael Thompson; January 24, 1951 (age 75) St. Helena, California, U.S.
- Party: Democratic
- Spouse: Jan Thompson
- Children: 2
- Education: Napa Valley College (attended); California State University, Chico (BA, MPA)
- Website: House website Campaign website

Military service
- Branch/service: United States Army
- Years of service: 1967–1973
- Rank: Staff Sergeant
- Unit: 173rd Airborne Brigade
- Battles/wars: Vietnam War
- Awards: Purple Heart
- Thompson's voice Thompson on the America Gives More Act of 2014. Recorded July 17, 2014

Charles Michael Thompson (born January 24, 1951) is an American politician serving as the U.S. representative for California's 4th congressional district (known as the 1st congressional district until 2013, and the California's 5th congressional district until 2023) since 1999. The district, in the northern portion of the San Francisco Bay Area, includes all of Lake and Napa counties and parts of Solano, Yolo and Sonoma counties. He is a moderate Democrat and member of the conservative Blue Dog Coalition. Thompson was first elected in 1998, winning reelection 13 times, before losing his seat in 2026 to liberal challenger Eric Jones 52.5% to 47.5% in an upset.

== Early life, education and career ==
Thompson was born in St. Helena, California, the son of Beverly Ann (née Forni) and Charles Edward Thompson. His father was of English ancestry and his mother was of Italian and Swiss descent. He was educated at California State University, Chico, served in Vietnam with the United States Army's 173rd Airborne Brigade, was a vineyard owner and maintenance supervisor, taught Public Administration and State Government at San Francisco State University and California State University, Chico, and was a member of the California State Senate before entering the House.

== Early political career ==
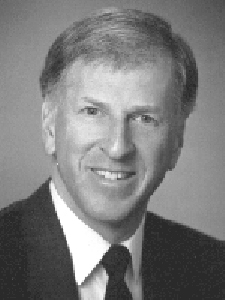
Thompson as a member of the California State Senate in 1997.

Thompson was an aide to Jackie Speier (then a state assemblywoman) before winning election to the California State Senate in 1990. He unseated 4th District incumbent Jim Nielsen after a controversy over Nielsen's primary residence; Thompson's margin of victory was less than 1%.

After the 1992 general election, state senator Barry Keene of the neighboring 2nd District resigned. Thompson, whose hometown of St. Helena had shifted from the 4th District into the 2nd after reapportionment, ran in the 1993 special election for Keene's seat. He narrowly beat Republican businesswoman Margie Handley and was elected to a full term in 1994.

National Democrats approached Thompson about running for Congress in 1996 against freshman Republican Frank Riggs. Thompson's state Senate district was virtually coextensive with the congressional district. Thompson declined, believing his Senate seniority would be more beneficial to his district than would his being a freshman U.S. congressman. But in 1998, Thompson was due to be termed out of the state Senate, and opted to run for Congress. Riggs did not seek reelection to his House seat and made an unsuccessful bid for the United States Senate. Thompson was elected by almost a 30% margin and has been reelected ever since without substantive opposition, turning what was a swing district for most of the 1980s and '90s into a fairly safe Democratic seat.

For his first seven terms, Thompson represented a district stretching from the far northern part of the San Francisco Bay Area all the way to the North Coast. But after the 2010 census, his district was renumbered as the 5th and made somewhat more compact, losing most of its northern part to the 2nd District.

== U.S. House of Representatives ==
=== Tenure ===
Thompson is a member of the conservative Blue Dog Coalition. Thompson voted with President Joe Biden's stated position 100% of the time in the 117th Congress, according to a FiveThirtyEight analysis.

=== Political positions ===
==== Abortion ====
Thompson is a Roman Catholic, but is pro-choice. In May 2004, he and 47 other Catholic Democratic members of Congress sent a letter to Cardinal Theodore McCarrick of Washington, D.C., to dissuade him from refusing to administer Holy Communion to Catholic members who voted in favor of pro-choice legislation. In February 2006, Thompson was one of 55 Democratic U.S. representatives identifying as Catholic who signed a "Statement of Principles" that affirmed a commitment to their faith but acknowledged opposition to Catholic doctrine on some issues. They wrote that on those issues, such as abortion rights, they would follow their conscience instead of the church's teachings. In response, the U.S. Catholic Bishops issued a "Statement on Responsibilities of Catholics in Public Life" that said, in part, "Catholic teaching calls all Catholics to work actively to restrain, restrict and bring to an end the destruction of unborn human life."

Thompson opposed the overturning of Roe v. Wade, calling it "an assault on women".

==== Cannabis ====
In 2015, Thompson proposed tougher penalties for marijuana growers who operate on trespassed land. The U.S. Sentencing Commission adopted the tougher sentencing guidelines, which went into effect in November 2015, after a six-month congressional review. The guidelines were intended to increase public safety.

==== Environmental issues ====
Thompson voted for President George W. Bush's Healthy Forests Initiative, which some environmentalists saw as a favor to the timber industry. He has disappointed some environmentalists with votes against limits to new commercial logging roads in Alaska's Tongass National Forest and against limits to hunting bears over bait. He was also one of only 30 Democrats to vote against an amendment to maintain roadless areas protected under the Roadless Rule. Thompson received a B rating from the American Wilderness Coalition in 2003 and an A+ in 2004.

The Sierra Club endorsed Thompson for reelection in 2010.

Thompson has voted several times to weaken the Clean Water Act.

In March 2012, Thompson and state Assemblyman Jared Huffman voiced their opposition to a piece of water legislation that the House would be voting on, which Thompson argued would "kill local jobs, ignore 20 years of established science and overturn a century of California water law."

==== Foreign policy ====
In late 2002, Thompson joined Representatives Jim McDermott and David Bonior on a fact-finding trip to Iraq. During the trip, they spoke to officials in Baghdad and residents of Basra. They expressed skepticism about the George W. Bush administration's claims that Iraqi President Saddam Hussein was stockpiling weapons of mass destruction.

On March 26, 2008, Muthanna Al-Hanooti, an official of a Michigan charity, was accused of underwriting three members of Congress to travel to Iraq on behalf of Iraqi intelligence officials. McDermott's office was already organizing the trip when the charity offered to pay the trip expenses. McDermott's spokesman claimed the charity was fully vetted by the U.S. government. He also stated that the representatives obtained a license from the State Department's Office of Foreign Assets Control for the group to travel to Iraq.

==== Health care ====
Thompson has supported a public option for health insurance. In 2009, he wrote, "[b]y streamlining health care, reducing fraud and abuse, ending unnecessary testing, discouraging over-utilization, investing in smart reforms, and emphasizing preventive health care, we can significantly bring down the cost of health care." In 2010, Thompson voted for the Affordable Care Act (Obamacare).

=== Committee assignments ===
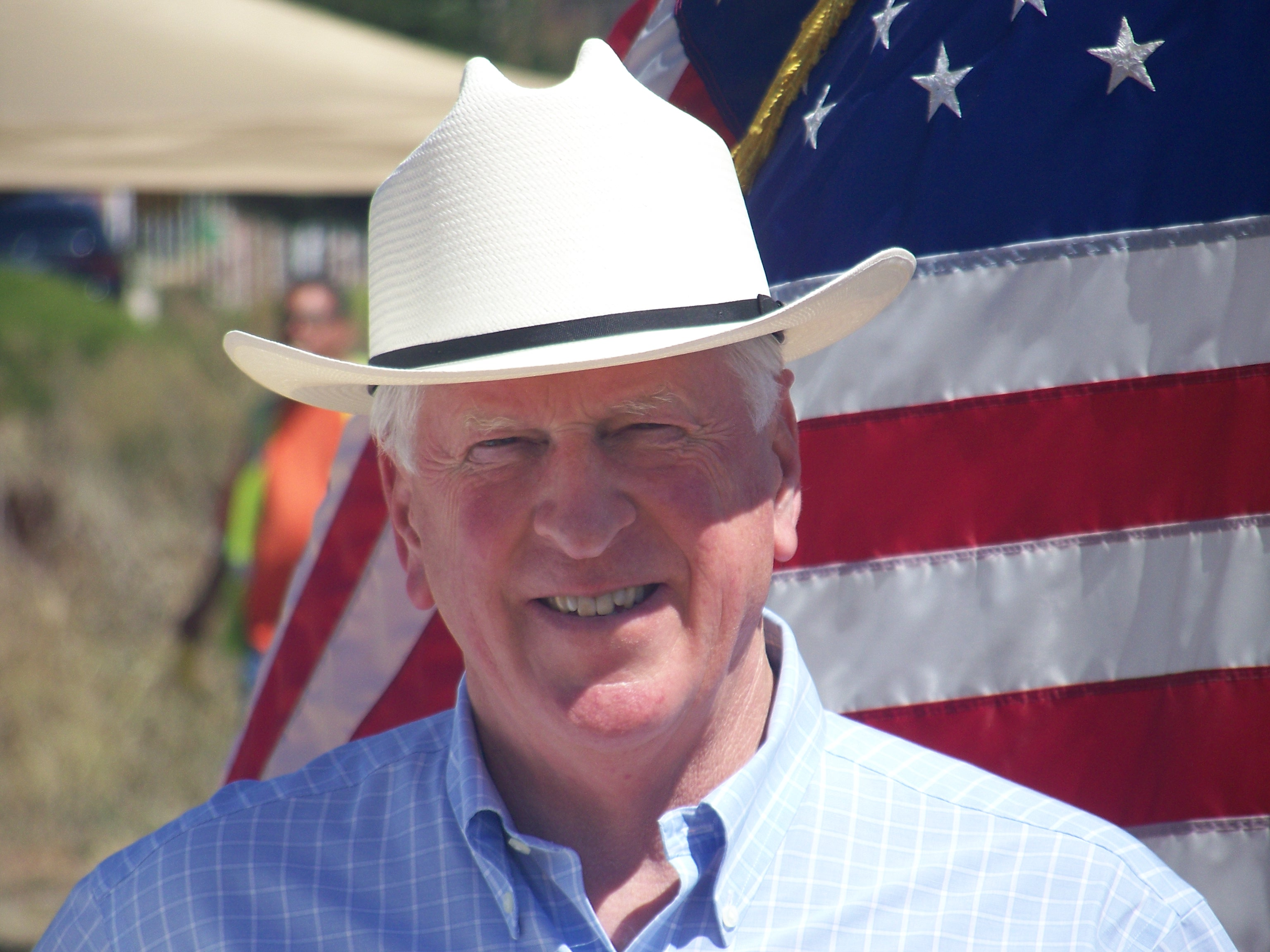
Mike Thompson in 2010

For the 119th Congress:

- Committee on Ways and Means
  - Subcommittee on Health
  - Subcommittee on Tax (Ranking Member)

=== Caucus memberships ===
- Blue Dog Coalition
- Congressional Wine Caucus (Co-chair)
- Congressional Arts Caucus
- Congressional NextGen 9-1-1 Caucus
- Congressional Wildlife Refuge Caucus
- Climate Solutions Caucus
- U.S.-Japan Caucus

== Personal life ==
Thompson is married to Janet Thompson. They met at a party in Yountville, California. They reside in St. Helena and also maintain a home in Washington, D.C.

The Thompsons are avid home cooks and cook for fundraisers to benefit local nonprofits, such as for renovations to the Point Reyes Lighthouse, and Thompson's campaigns. Local Napa Valley wineries often sponsor Thompson's campaigns with lunches, dinners, wine tastings and tours. Thompson is also a longtime volunteer for the Napa Valley wine auction fundraiser.

== Electoral history ==
Electoral history of Mike Thompson
| Year | Office | | Party | Primary | | | General | | | Result | Swing | Ref. |
| Year | Office | | Party | Total | % | P. | Total | % | P. | Result | Swing | Ref. |
|---|---|---|---|---|---|---|---|---|---|---|---|---|
| 1990 | State Senate | 4th | Democratic | 52,161 | 56.16% | 1st | 125,573 | 47.67% | 1st | Won | Gain | |
| 1993 | State Senate | 2nd | Democratic | 42,385 | 47.16% | 1st | 48,098 | 47.57% | 1st | Won | Hold | |
| 1994 | State Senate | 2nd | Democratic | 80,070 | 100.0% | 1st | 162,610 | 60.41% | 1st | Won | Hold | |
| 1998 | U.S. House | 1st | Democratic | 77,544 | 78.02% | 1st | 121,710 | 61.85% | 1st | Won | Gain | |
| 2000 | U.S. House | 1st | Democratic | 112,185 | 100.0% | 1st | 155,638 | 65.03% | 1st | Won | Hold | |
| 2002 | U.S. House | 1st | Democratic | 64,401 | 100.0% | 1st | 118,669 | 64.07% | 1st | Won | Hold | |
| 2004 | U.S. House | 1st | Democratic | 92,371 | 100.0% | 1st | 189,366 | 66.92% | 1st | Won | Hold | |
| 2006 | U.S. House | 1st | Democratic | 79,138 | 100.0% | 1st | 144,409 | 66.23% | 1st | Won | Hold | |
| 2008 | U.S. House | 1st | Democratic | 69,622 | 87.71% | 1st | 197,812 | 68.10% | 1st | Won | Hold | |
| 2010 | U.S. House | 1st | Democratic | 74,695 | 100.0% | 1st | 147,307 | 62.79% | 1st | Won | Hold | |
| 2012 | U.S. House | 5th | Democratic | 95,748 | 72.20% | 1st | 202,872 | 74.47% | 1st | Won | Hold | |
| 2014 | U.S. House | 5th | Democratic | 88,709 | 80.44% | 1st | 129,613 | 75.73% | 1st | Won | Hold | |
| 2016 | U.S. House | 5th | Democratic | 124,634 | 65.70% | 1st | 224,526 | 76.87% | 1st | Won | Hold | |
| 2018 | U.S. House | 5th | Democratic | 121,428 | 79.33% | 1st | 205,860 | 78.87% | 1st | Won | Hold | |
| 2020 | U.S. House | 5th | Democratic | 146,980 | 67.54% | 1st | 271,233 | 76.09% | 1st | Won | Hold | |
| 2022 | U.S. House | 4th | Democratic | 115,041 | 66.23% | 1st | 176,900 | 67.80% | 1st | Won | Hold | |
| 2024 | U.S. House | 4th | Democratic | 120,736 | 62.52% | 1st | 227,730 | 66.46% | 1st | Won | Hold | |
| 2026 | U.S. House | 4th | Democratic | 84,753 | 40.97% | 1st | TBD | | | | | |
Source: Secretary of State of California | Statewide Election Results

U.S. House of Representatives
| Preceded by Frank Riggs | Member of the U.S. House of Representatives from California's 1st congressional district 1999–2013 | Succeeded by Doug LaMalfa |
| Preceded by Doris Matsui | Member of the U.S. House of Representatives from California's 5th congressional district 2013–2023 | Succeeded by Tom McClintock |
| Preceded by Tom McClintock | Member of the U.S. House of Representatives from California's 4th congressional district 2023–present | Incumbent |
U.S. order of precedence (ceremonial)
| Preceded by Mike Simpson | United States representatives by seniority 30th | Succeeded by Pete Sessions |
| Preceded by Pete Sessions | Order of precedence of the United States | Succeeded by Mike Simpson |
