= Jim Nielsen =

American politician from California

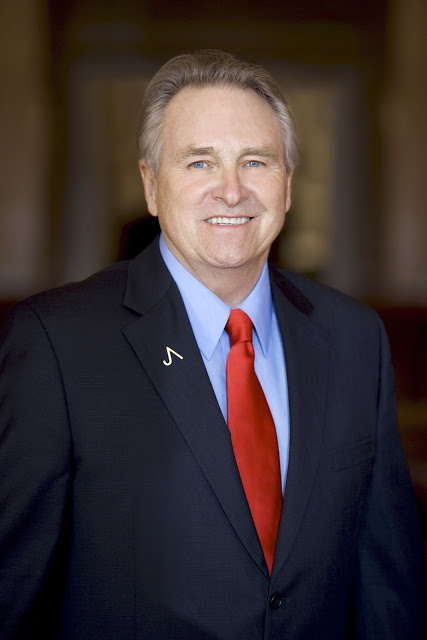

Member of the California State Senate from the 4th district
- In office January 10, 2013 – December 5, 2022
- Preceded by: Doug LaMalfa
- Succeeded by: Marie Alvarado-Gil

Member of the California State Assembly from the 2nd district
- In office December 1, 2008 – November 30, 2012
- Preceded by: Doug LaMalfa
- Succeeded by: Wesley Chesbro

Member of the California State Senate from the 4th district
- In office December 4, 1978 – November 30, 1990
- Preceded by: John F. Dunlap
- Succeeded by: Mike Thompson

Personal details
- Born: James Wiley Nielsen; July 31, 1944 (age 82) Fresno, California, U.S.
- Party: Republican
- Spouse: Marilyn Nielsen
- Children: 5
- Education: California State University, Fresno
- Occupation: Rancher

James Wiley Nielsen (born July 31, 1944) is an American politician from California who served in the California State Senate for the 4th district. A member of the Republican Party, Nielsen served on the Yolo County Republican Committee before first winning election to the California State Senate in 1978. Nielsen served in the State Senate until 1990, in the State Assembly from 2009 to 2012, and returned to the State Senate following a 2013 special election.

== Early life and education ==
On July 31, 1944, Nielsen was born in Fresno, California.

Nielsen has a bachelor's degree in Agricultural Business from California State University, Fresno.

== Career ==
=== 1978 election ===
Nielsen was first elected to the Senate in 1978 by defeating 4th district incumbent John Dunlap, a freshman Democrat. Nielsen then went on to win easy reelections in 1982 and 1986.

=== State Senate ===
Nielsen served as Republican Leader in the Senate from 1983 until 1987.

Nielsen established himself as a traditional tough-on-crime conservative who championed the cause for lower taxes, controlled government spending and gun rights for law-abiding citizens. He authored legislation to promote welfare reform and reduce welfare fraud, including the acclaimed GAIN program, and he authored and coauthored bills to promote agricultural exports.

=== 1990 defeat ===
Nielsen was narrowly unseated by Democrat Mike Thompson, an aide to then Assemblywoman Jackie Speier. Thompson benefited from ethics issues and verbal gaffes made by the incumbent, as well as changing demographics in the district.

=== Post-senatorial career ===
After leaving the legislature, Nielsen served on the Agriculture Labor Relations Board. In 1992, he was appointed to the Board of Parole and Prison Terms and served as its chairman from 1993 until 2000.

=== Residency questions ===
A question of residency eligibility arose during his bid for the Assembly in 2008, because Nielsen owns 2 homes, one in the district he represents and one near the capitol. Nielsen won the case and even received a judgment for court costs in the amount of $7,400 against Plaintiff Don Bird. Plaintiff appealed to the Secretary of State who then deferred to the State Attorney General. After reviewing the case, the Attorney General issued a letter on December 22, 2008, stating there was no evidence to warrant further investigation and the matter was closed.

=== Expenditures ===
Nielsen was also the largest taxpayer-funded gas card spender in the state legislature for 2010 costing $10,410.68

== Personal life ==
Nielsen's wife is Marilyn. They have five children.

== Additional sources ==
- Vassar, Alex; Shane Meyers (2007). "Jim Nielsen, Republican". JoinCalifornia.com. Retrieved on October 3, 2008
- California Journal Vol. XXI, No. 10 (October 1990) "Wilson vs. Feinstein". StateNet Publications, October 1990.
- California Journal Vol. XXVI, No. 12 (December 1990) "Complete District By District Analysis". StateNet Publications, December 1990.
