= Sutter Solano Medical Center =

Hospital in Vallejo, California

Coordinates: 38°7′52″N 122°14′15″W

Sutter Solano Medical Center (SSMC) is a 106-bed general acute care hospital located in Vallejo, California, the largest city in Solano County and second largest city in the North Bay (San Francisco Bay Area). It is part of Sutter Health.

In 1907, James Hogan established the Hogan Hospital at Virginia Street and Sonoma Boulevard in Vallejo. A few years later, the hospital was sold to Tobe Williams, who in 1921 founded a new facility to replace Hogan Hospital. The new Vallejo General Hospital operated at its Tennessee Street location until 1969, when it moved to a new home by Lake Chabot. Vallejo General joined Sutter Health in 1984 and became Sutter Solano Medical Center.

The Sutter Solano Cancer Center opened in 2005 and is accredited by the American College of Surgeons' Commission on Cancer. As members of the Sutter Cancer Research Consortium, Sutter Solano participates in the National Cancer Institute's Cancer Research Network. In 2017, SSMC partnered with Touro University California in Vallejo to open a mobile diabetes education center.

SSMC received an "A" grade for patient safety from The Leapfrog Group in 2024. In 2020, SSMC received the Gold Quality Achievement Award from the American Heart Association for high quality heart failure care.
