= Frank S. Petersen =

American politician

Frank S. Peterson
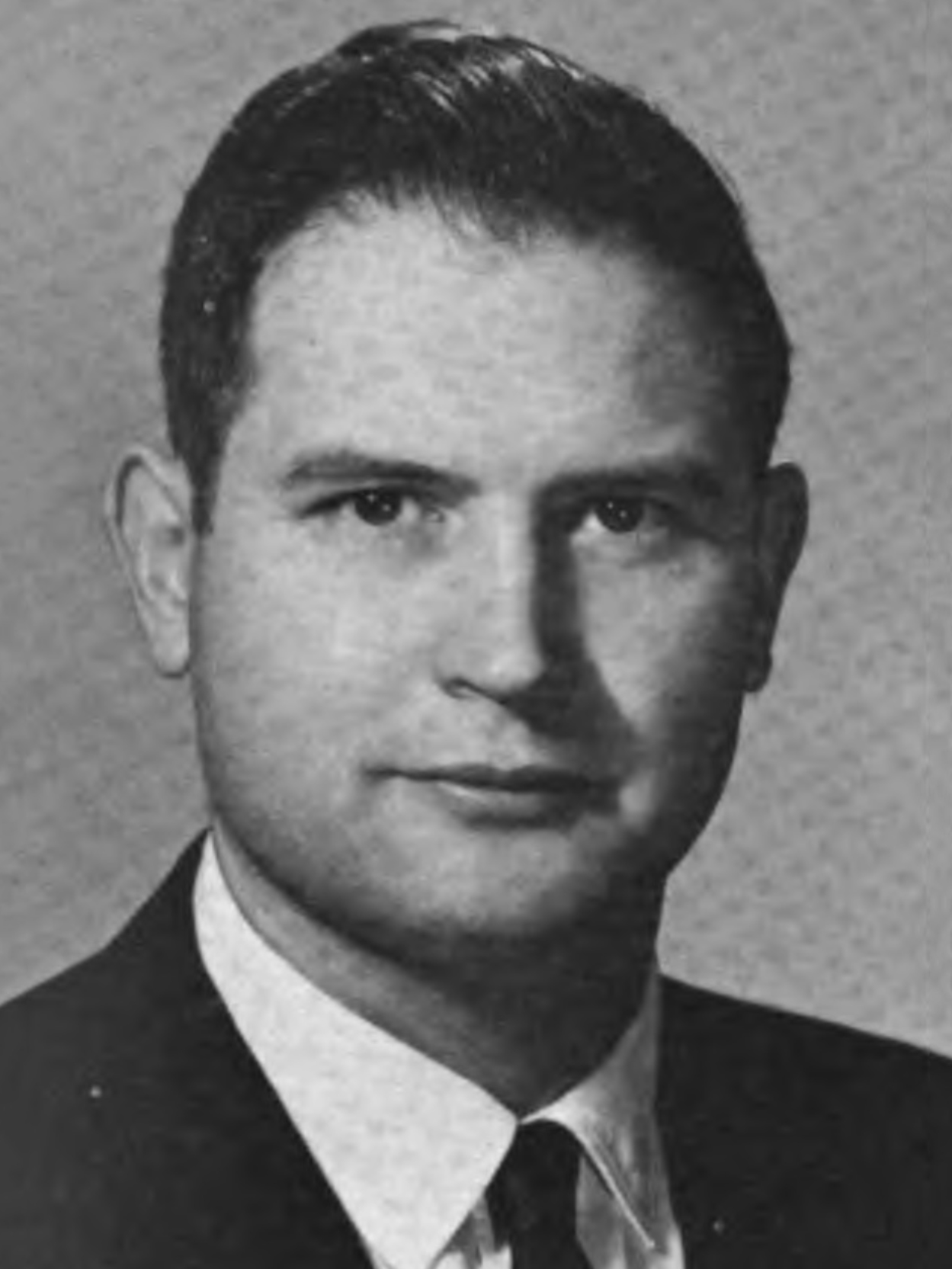
- Official portrait, 1963

Member of the California Senate from the 4th district
- In office January 7, 1963 – January 2, 1967
- Preceded by: Waverly Jack Slattery
- Succeeded by: John F. McCarthy

Personal details
- Born: June 20, 1922 Elk, California, U.S.
- Died: May 23, 2011 (aged 88) Fort Bragg, California, U.S.
- Party: Democratic
- Spouse: Marianne
- Children: 6
- Education: Santa Rosa Junior College; University of San Francisco

Military service
- Branch/service: United States Navy
- Battles/wars: World War II

Frank S. Petersen (June 20, 1922 – May 23, 2011) was a northern California jurist and politician who represented California's 4th State Senate district from 1963 to 1966 and served as a California Superior Court Judge for Del Norte County from 1966 to 1988.

== Early life ==
Petersen was born June 20, 1922, in a logging camp near Elk, Mendocino County, California, and grew up in nearby Fort Bragg, California. He enlisted in the United States Navy during World War II, after which he received an associate degree from Santa Rosa Junior College in 1948 and a J.D. from the University of San Francisco in 1951. After working in a private practice and the county district attorney's office, he became the district attorney for Mendocino County in 1960. During his term as D.A., he became embroiled in a controversy called the "War of the Warrants" that began with a domestic abuse case, led to the issuance of 57 arrest warrants, and ended with the conviction of four people, two of them sitting judges, for obstruction of justice.

== Political and judicial career ==
In 1962, Petersen ran for office as a California State Senator for California's 4th State Senate district, which at that time covered both Mendocino and Lake Counties. Despite the attempts of the judges in the War of the Warrants to embarrass him during his campaign, he won election and served until 1966. He succeeded Waverly Jack Slattery as state senator, and in turn was succeeded by John F. McCarthy. His actions as state senator included the opening of Hendy Woods State Park, an old-growth coast redwood forest in Mendocino County.

Petersen's chances of remaining in the senate were damaged in the 1965 redistricting process, and in June 1966, governor Pat Brown appointed Petersen as judge for the Superior Court for Del Norte County, succeeding Michael H. Messner in that position. Among the cases he heard was one in which the Pacific Lumber Company was sued for its clear cutting of old-growth redwoods. In 1988, Petersen retired as a judge and soon after returned to private practice. However, he was recalled to the bench in 1993. He returned to Fort Bragg in his retirement, and died there on May 23, 2011.
