= MarinHealth Medical Center =

Hospital in California, United States

- Marin Healthcare District
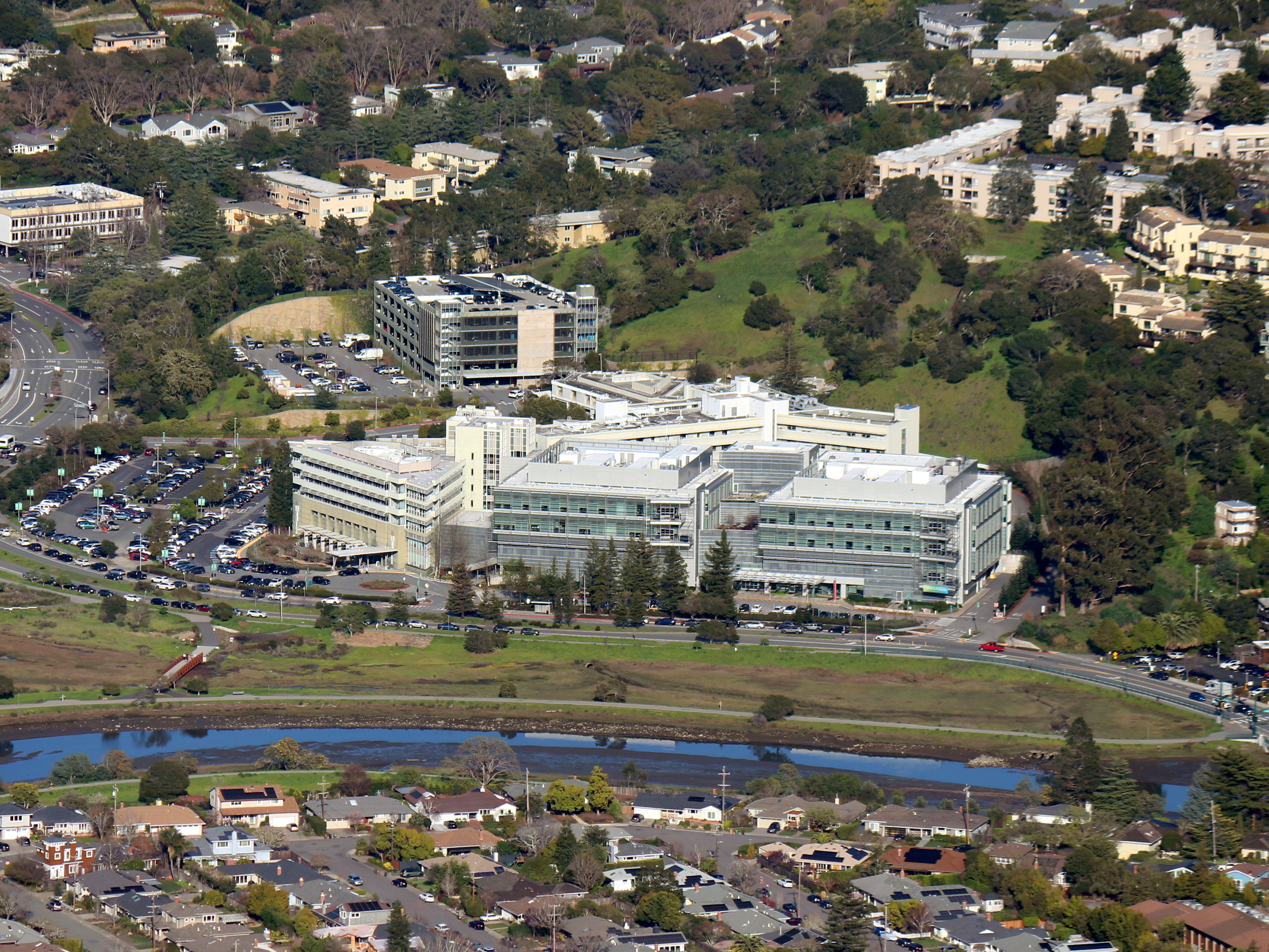
- MarinHealth Medical Center viewed from Mount Tamalpais in 2026

Geography
- Location: 250 Bon Air Rd; Greenbrae, California 94904, United States
- Coordinates: 37°56′50″N 122°32′10″W

Organization
- Affiliated university: UCSF Medical Center

Services
- Emergency department: Level III Trauma center
- Beds: 114

History
- Opened: 1952

Links
- Website: www.mymarinhealth.org
- Lists: Hospitals in the United States

MarinHealth Medical Center, formerly known as Marin General Hospital, is a nonprofit district hospital and Level III Trauma Center in Greenbrae, California. The hospital is owned by the Marin Healthcare District, a public agency, and operated by the nonprofit MarinHealth system. It is the primary acute-care facility serving Marin County.

== History ==
Marin General Hospital opened in 1952, wholly administered by the Marin Healthcare District, which was established 6 years prior. In 1961, 116 beds were added. In 1981, funding in the form of a bond was secured to construct the building's west wing, adding 78 beds. Four years later, the Marin Healthcare District Board entered into a 30-year leasing agreement with the nonprofit Marin General Hospital Corporation, who entered an affiliation with California Healthcare Systems (CHS) shortly after. In 1995, ownership and operation was transferred to Sutter Health following their acquisition of CHS. On June 30, 2010, Marin Healthcare District resumed control of Marin General Hospital. On July 30, 2019, Marin General Hospital became MarinHealth Medical Center. As part of the change, the Marin General Hospital Foundation became the MarinHealth Foundation. Then, in 2020, a new 260,000-square-foot (24,000 m^{2}) hospital building named the "Oak Pavilion" opened. The new building is home to Emergency & Trauma, Surgery, Maternity, Imaging, and Radiology departments, as well as 114 private rooms.

== Operations ==
Currently, the hospital is open 24/7, has 327 beds, and receives 70% of the county's ambulance traffic. The hospital has been affiliated with UCSF for several decades.

== Notable patients ==
- Peter H. Behr, California state senator and environmentalist who died of Parkinson's
- Richard Ramirez, American serial killer who died of complications secondary to B-cell lymphoma
