= Waverly Jack Slattery =

American politician

Member of the California Senate from the 4th district
- In office January 5, 1959 - January 7, 1963
- Preceded by: James E. Busch
- Succeeded by: Frank S. Petersen

Personal details
- Born: December 24, 1904 Ukiah, California, U.S.
- Died: August 29, 1983 (aged 78) San Mateo, California, U.S.
- Party: Democratic
- Children: 1

Military service
- Branch/service: United States Army
- Battles/wars: World War II

Waverly Jack Slattery (December 24, 1904 – August 29, 1983) served in the California State Senate for the 4th District from 1959 to 1963. During World War II he served in the United States Army.
