= Greenbrae, California =

Unincorporated community in California, United States

Greenbrae
- Neighborhood and Unincorporated community
- Location in California Greenbrae (the United States)
- Coordinates: 37°56′55″N 122°31′29″W
- Country: United States
- State: California
- County: Marin
- Elevation: 33 ft (10 m)
- Area codes: 415/628

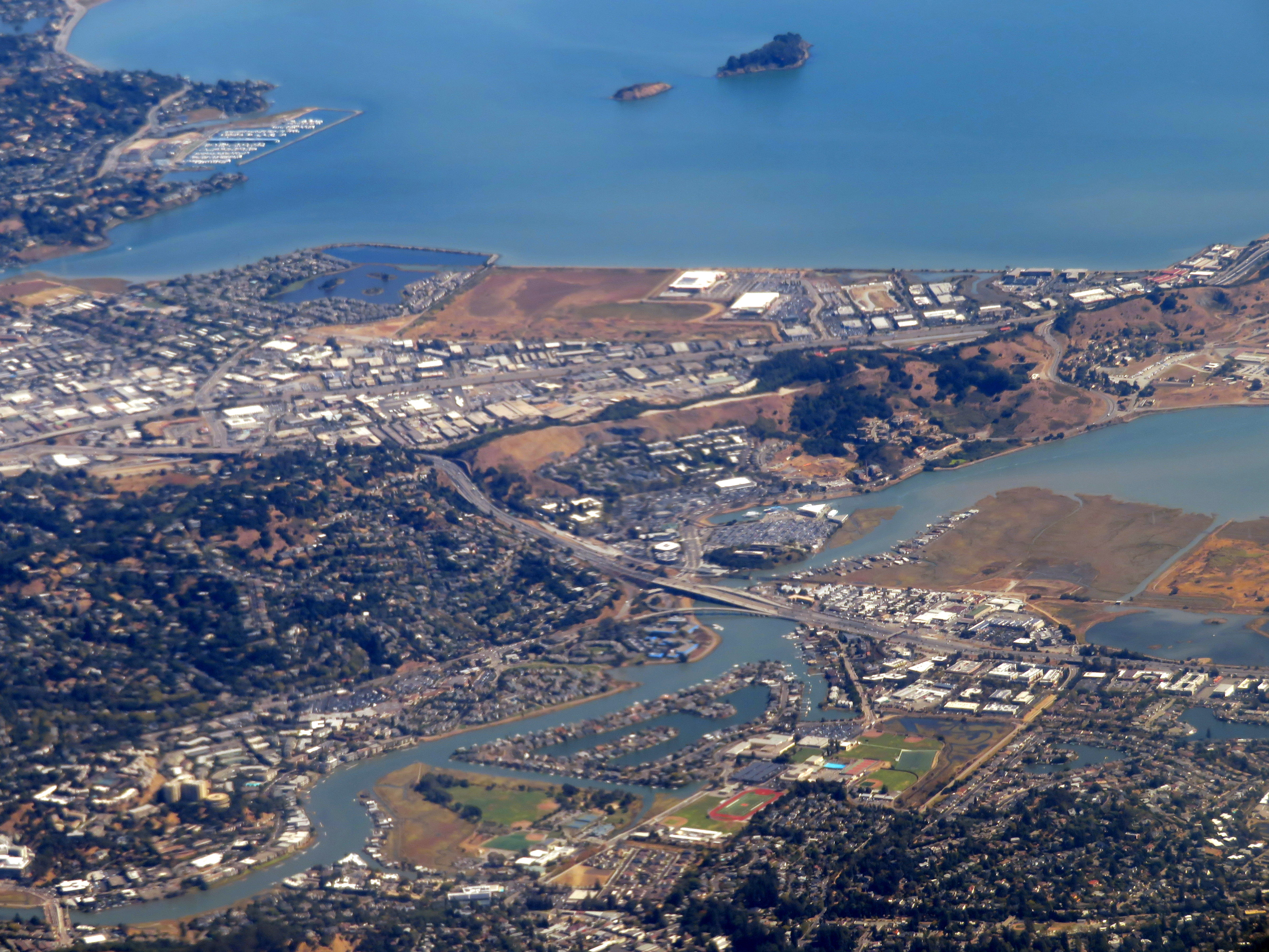
Aerial view of Greenbrae, CA

Greenbrae is a small unincorporated community in Marin County, California, United States. It is located 1.5 miles (2 km) south-southeast of downtown San Rafael, at an elevation of 33 feet (10 m), and adjacent to U.S. Route 101 at the opening of the Ross Valley. Part of Greenbrae is an unincorporated community of the county, while the remaining area is inside the city limits of Larkspur. The ZIP code is 94904, and is shared with Kentfield. The community is served by area codes 415 and 628

Greenbrae is home to MarinHealth Medical Center, the main hospital and emergency treatment center for central and southern Marin County.

== About ==
Predominantly composed of hillside and waterfront terrain, its homes and offices are known for their views of the San Francisco Bay, Corte Madera Creek, and Mount Tamalpais. "Brae" means a steep bank or hillside in dialects of Scotland and Northern Ireland; Greenbrae translates to "green hillside."

Greenbrae is generally defined as the area straddling Sir Francis Drake Boulevard, between Wolf Grade Drive and Highway 101 (east of which is the Larkspur Landing area), between Corte Madera Creek in the south and the San Rafael city limit to the north. Some narrower definitions include only the area north of Sir Francis Drake Boulevard. Parts of Greenbrae are within the city limits of Larkspur while some areas are unincorporated. The unincorporated area of Greenbrae is considered part of the Kentfield census-designated place according to the U. S. Census Bureau.

== Education ==
Greenbrae is served by the Tamalpais Union High School District including Bacich Elementary School and Kent Middle School.

== History ==
The developer of Greenbrae was Schultz Building Company, which included Niels Schultz and his son Niels Schultz Jr. In 1946, the land was originally 635 acres (257 ha) of farmland and was purchased for development by the Archdiocese of San Francisco. Schultz built more than 1,000 homes, 1,500 apartments and dozens of businesses. When designing the neighborhood they focused on saving the local oak trees, design, housing setbacks, landscaped medians, and open areas.

== Politics ==
In the state legislature, Greenbrae is in the 2nd senatorial district, represented by Democrat Mike McGuire, and in the 10th Assembly district, represented by Democrat Stephanie Nguyen.

Federally, Greenbrae is in California's 2nd congressional district, represented by Democrat Jared Huffman.

== Climate ==
This region experiences warm (but not hot) and dry summers, with no average monthly temperatures above 71.6 °F (22.0 °C). According to the Köppen Climate Classification system, Greenbrae has a warm-summer Mediterranean climate, abbreviated Csb on climate maps.

== Notable people ==
=== Artists ===
- Larry Sultan (1946–2009), photographer.

=== Entertainment ===
- Michael Krasny (born 1944), radio host.

=== Politicians and civil service ===
- Barbara Boxer (born 1940), member of the United States Senate, lived in Greenbrae until 2006.
- Gavin Newsom (born 1967), 40th Governor of California.

=== Sports ===
- Buddy Biancalana (born 1960), baseball player, was born in Greenbrae.
- Pete Carroll (born 1951), football coach raised in Greenbrae.
- Chad Kreuter (born 1964), baseball player, born in Greenbrae.
- Will Venable (born 1982), baseball player, born in Greenbrae.

=== Others ===
- William Del Monte (1905–2016), the last living survivor of the San Francisco earthquake of 1906. Lived in a Greenbrae assisted living community late in life.
- William Silverman (1917–2004), pediatrician who influenced the development of the neonatal intensive care unit.

== See also ==
- List of people from Marin County, California
