= Sugar Pine Lumber Company =

Defunct logging company in Madera and Fresno County, California, US

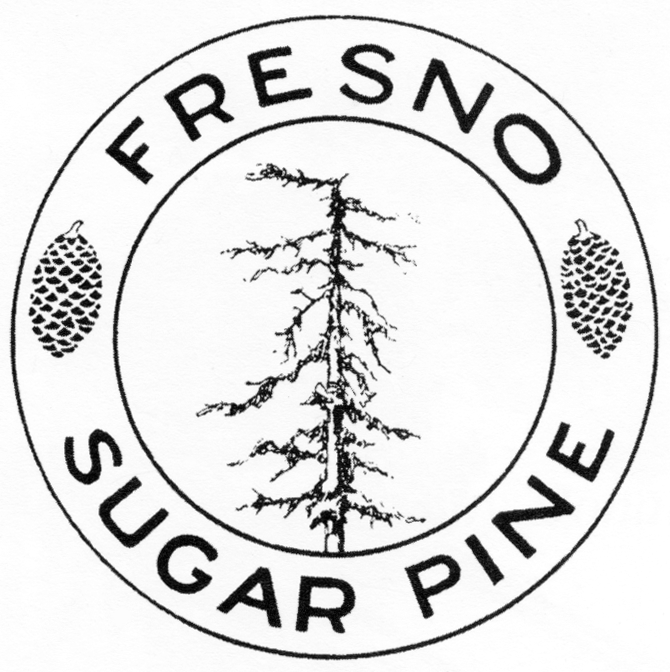

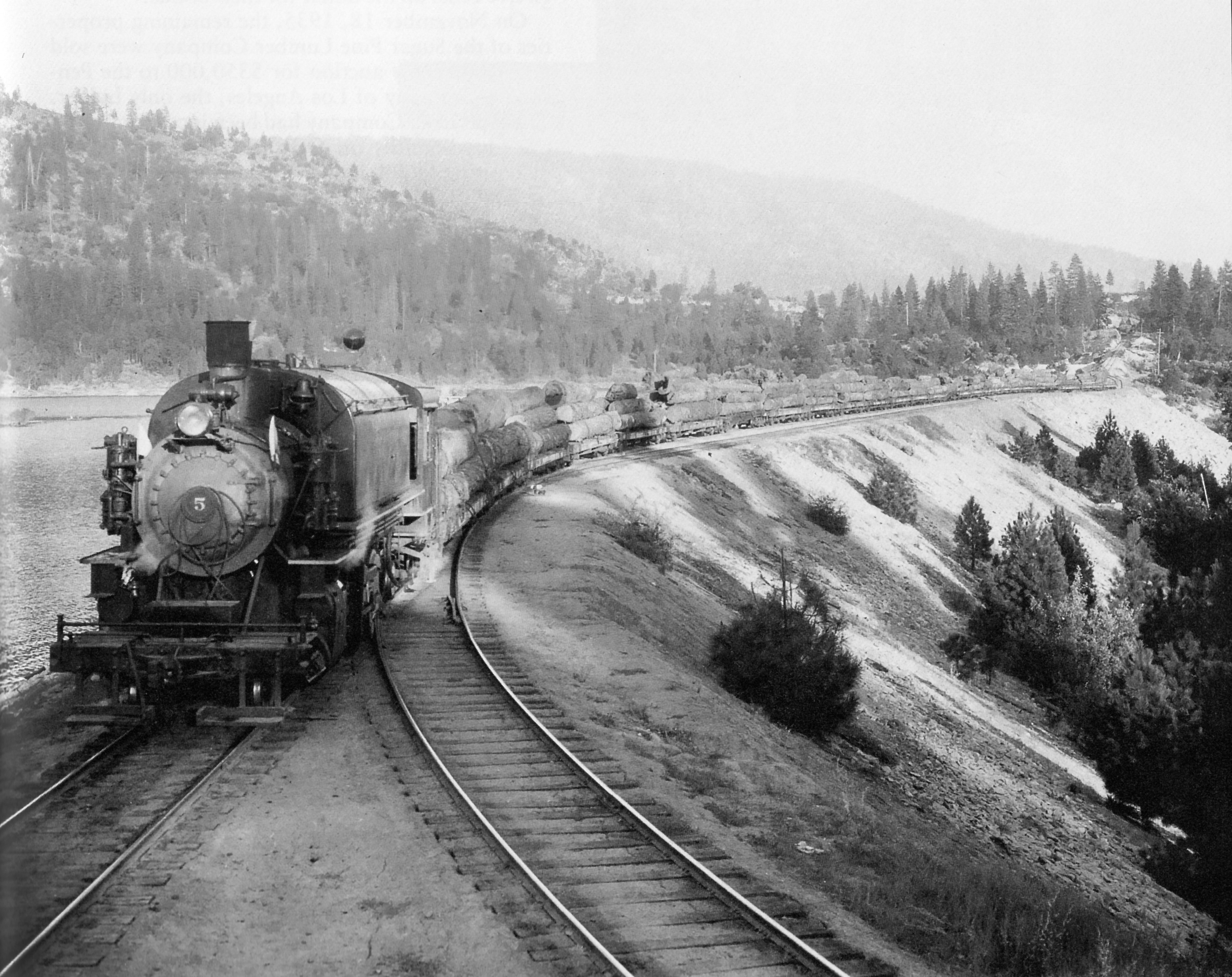
- Hauling logs over Bass Lake Dam in 1926.

Overview
- Locale: Sierra National Forest
- Dates of operation: 1923–1933

Technical
- Track gauge: 4 ft 8 1/2 in (1,435 mm) standard gauge
- Length: Minarets and Western Railway, 43.45 mi (69.93 km); Sugar Pine Lumber Company Railroad, 10.82 mi (17.41 km)

The Sugar Pine Lumber Company was an early 20th century logging operation and railroad in the Sierra Nevada. Unable to secure water rights to build a log flume, the company operated "the crookedest railroad in the world." They later developed the Minarets-type locomotive, the largest and most powerful saddle tank locomotive ever made. The company was also a pioneer in the electrification of logging where newly plentiful hydroelectric power replaced the widespread use of steam engines.

The company founded two towns. They built Central Camp, a permanent logging camp with lavish amenities, and Pinedale, site of the company lumber mill. They operated two railroads: the Sugar Pine Railroad, which connected Central Camp to the switching yard in Bass Lake, and the Minarets and Western Railway, a client carrier that transported whole logs from the Sierra Nevada to the company lumber mill.

The Sugar Pine Lumber Company became one of the most notable boom-and-bust stories of the 1920s logging industry. After an $8 million investment in 1923 (equivalent to $151,171,875 in 2025 dollars), it set records for California's annual lumber cut but quickly exhausted its timber holdings. By 1933, the company was bankrupt, overwhelmed by debt and high operating costs. Despite its advanced facilities, the expense of maintaining the camp and railroad made it impossible to turn a profit.

== History ==
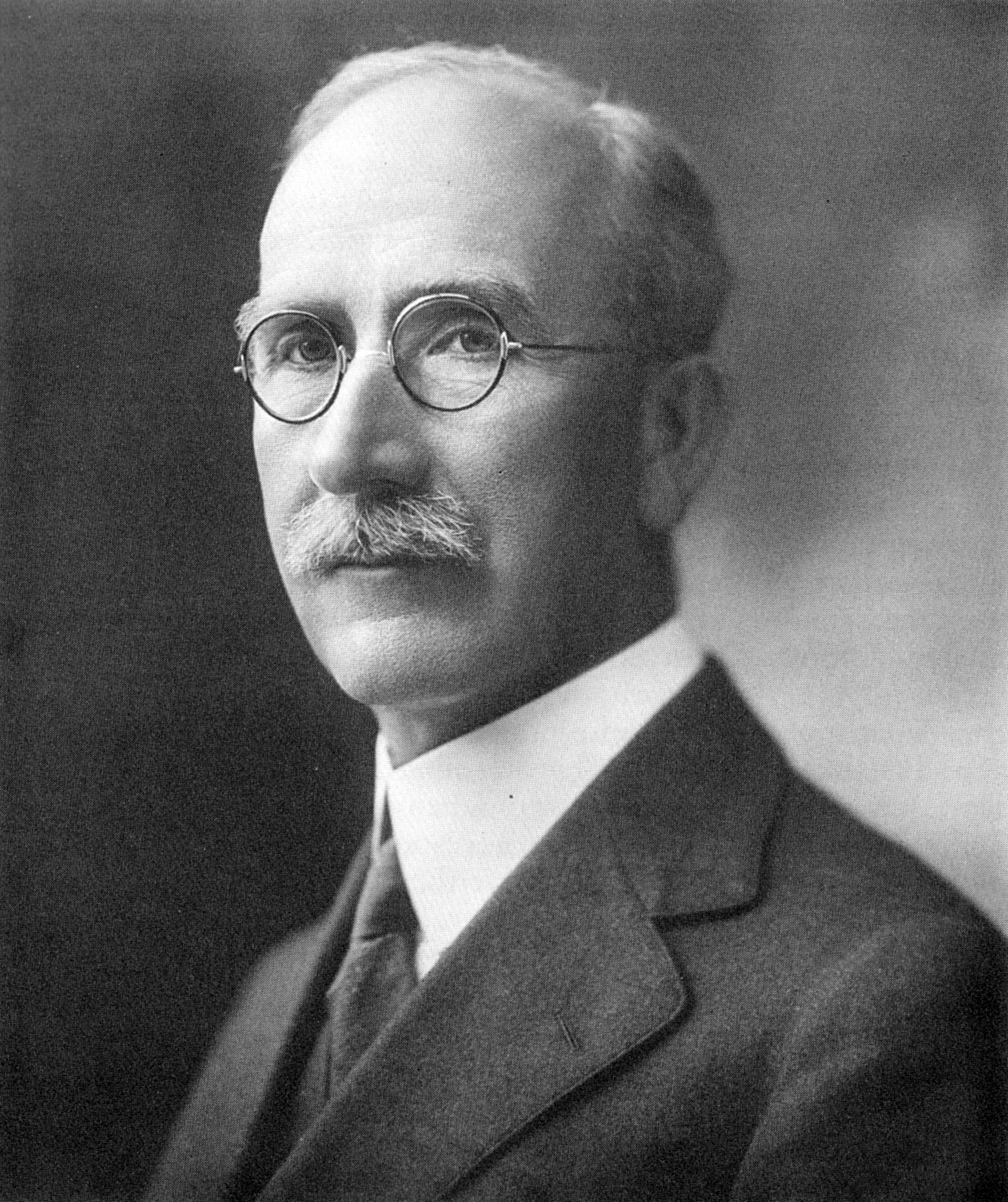
Founder and president Arthur H. Fleming.

The Sugar Pine Lumber Company was incorporated in July 1921 by Madera Sugar Pine Company officials Arthur Fleming, John Hemphill, and Elmer Cox and investor Robert Gillis. They acquired 50,000 acres (202 km^{2}) acres of old growth mixed conifer forest spanning eastward from the existing Madera Sugar Pine Lumber Company operation to the gorge of the San Joaquin River. Fresno and Madera County competed to be the site of a new sawmill and railroad terminus to be built in the San Joaquin Valley alongside the Southern Pacific line.

Fresno won the bid, offering a section of land that became known as Pinedale. Fresno also offered $375,000 in cash that helped the company secure the railroad right of way to the mountains.

== Railroads ==
The Sugar Pine Lumber Company acquired the timber holdings along the upper San Joaquin River. But it could not acquire the underlying water rights from San Joaquin Light and Power. This meant the company could not build a log flume to get the wood to market. Instead, two standard-gauge railroads were built connecting the sawmill with the lumber camp 63.27 mi (101.82 km) away.

=== Minarets and Western Railway ===
The Sugar Pine Lumber Company could not afford to build a single private railroad from the valley to the mountains. The distance covered more than forty miles of private rangeland and ranchers could set any price they wanted. A workaround was concocted to create a separate, subsidiary company that was incorporated as a common carrier. This allowed the necessary right-of-way to be secured easily and inexpensively at a fixed price. The 43.45 mi (69.93 km) right-of-way was negotiated for $175,000, paid for by the Fresno County location incentives. The railroad construction was financed by an initial company bond issue of $2.2 million (equivalent to $41,572,266 in 2025 dollars)

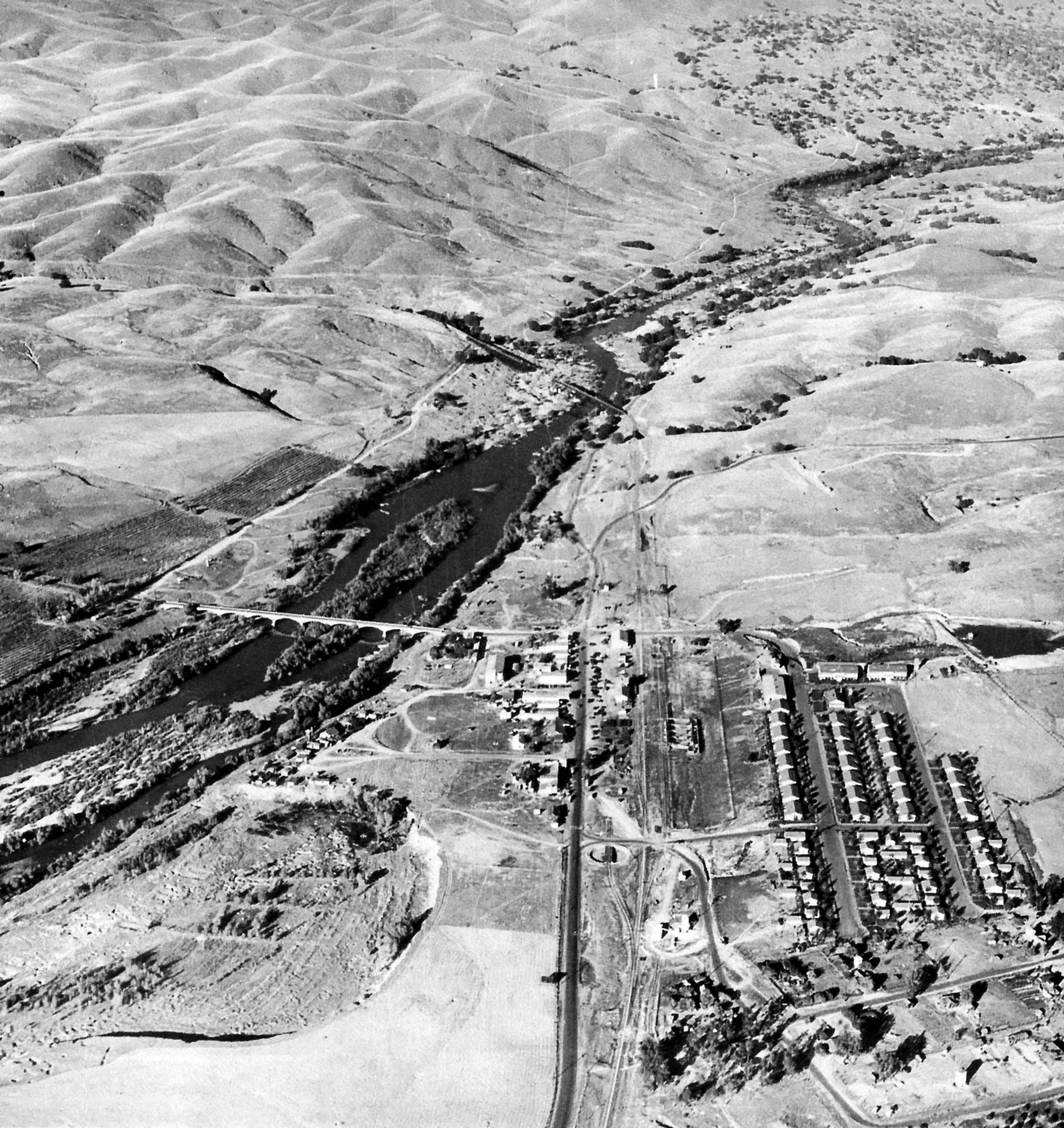
Railway route along the San Joaquin River.

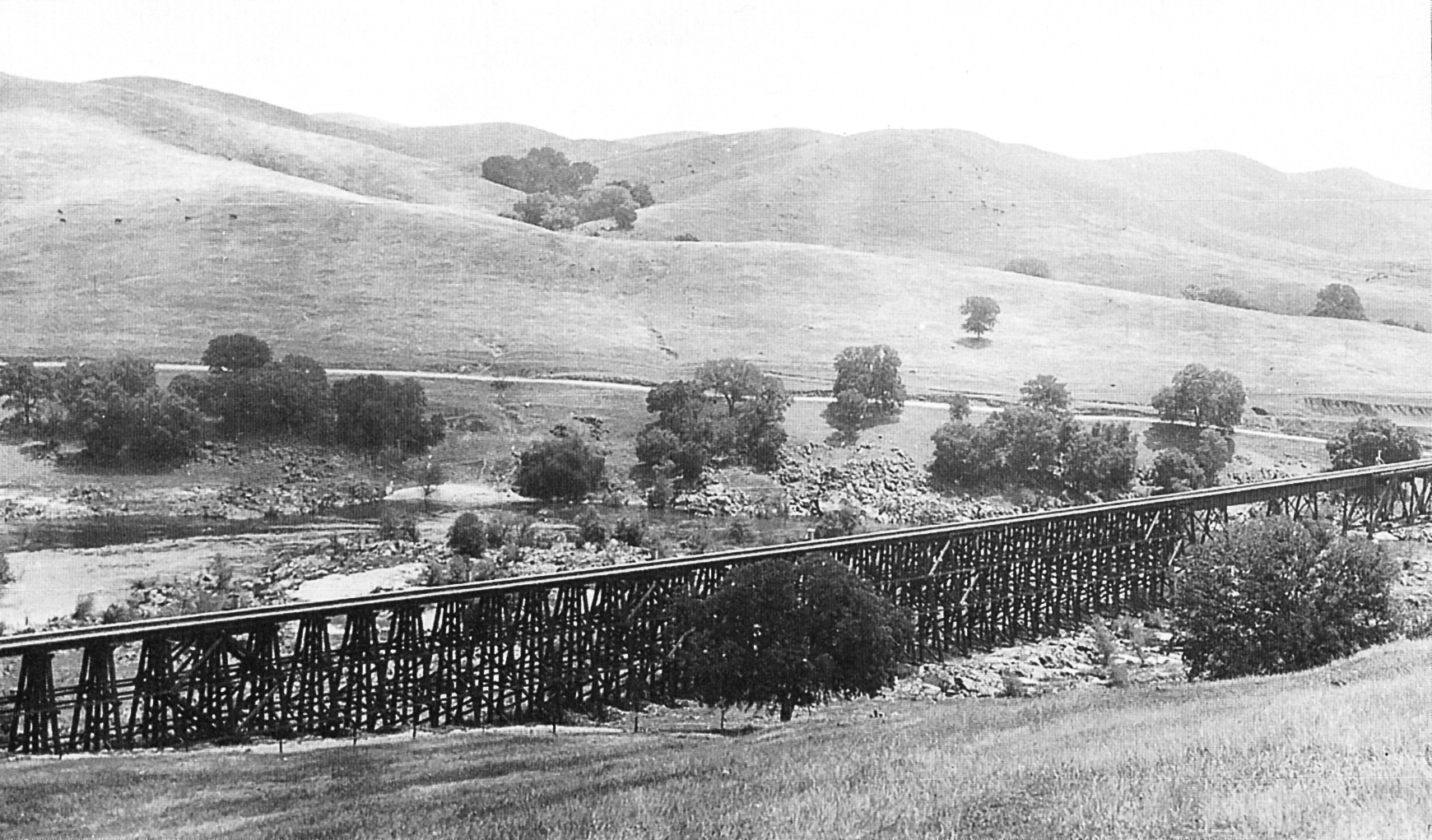
San Joaquin River trestle.

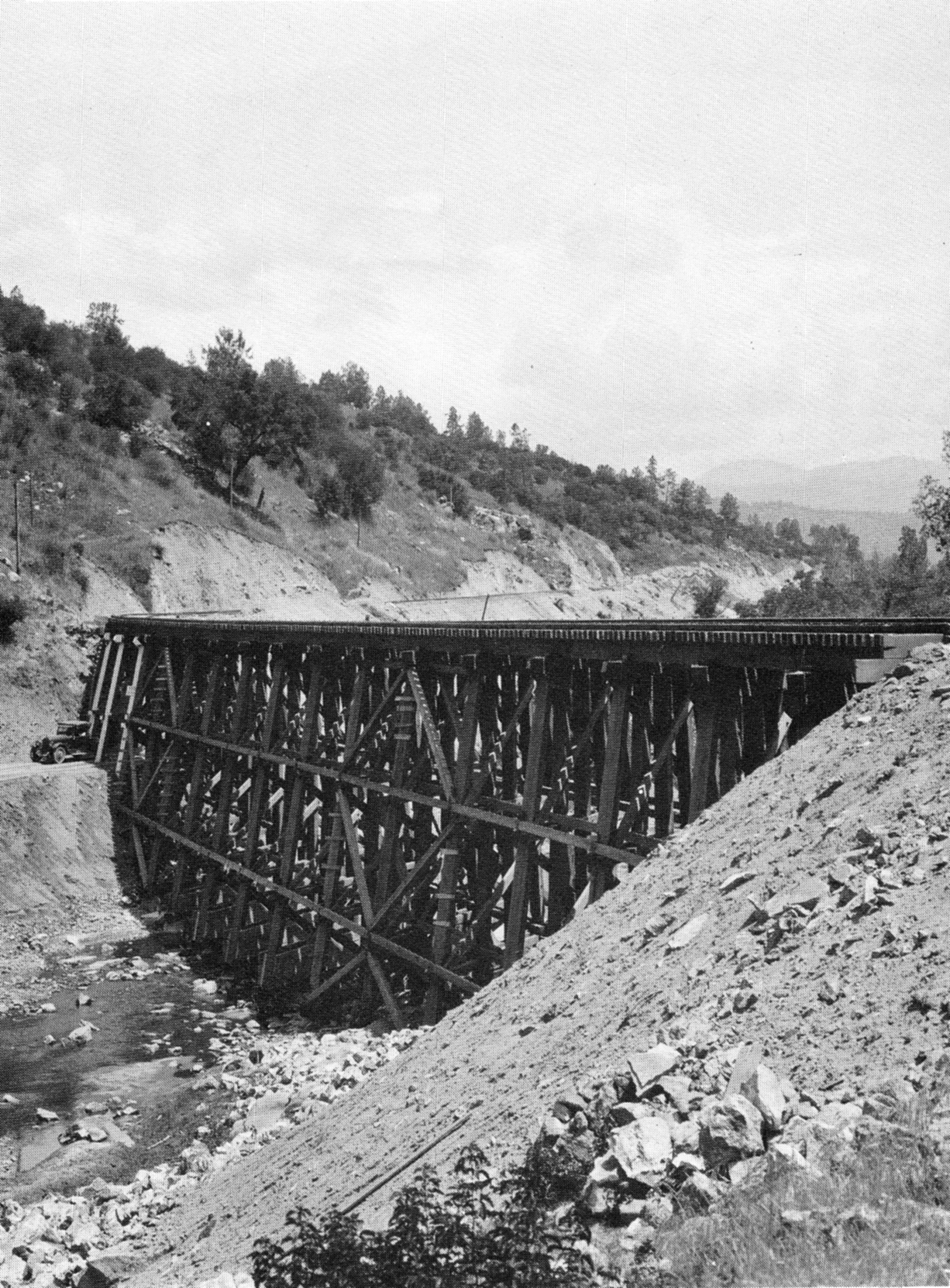
Finegold trestle.

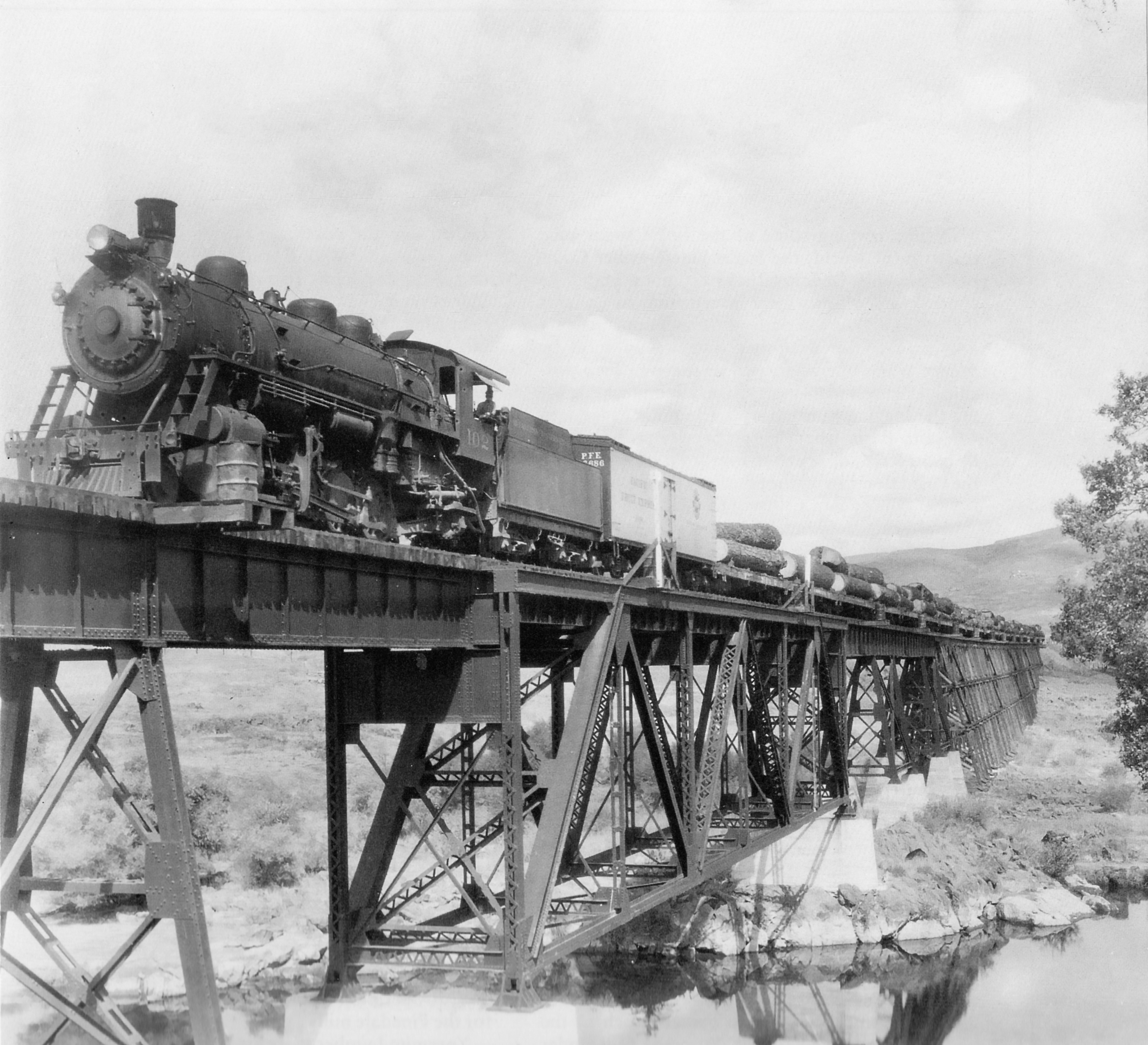
Minarets and Western Locomotive Number 102.

=== The Sugar Pine Railroad ===
The Minarets and Western Railway connected with the Sugar Pine Railroad at the Wishon switching yards at Bass Lake. From there, the Minarets and Western flat cars were pulled up a 10.82 mi (17.41 km) standard gauge railroad to Central Camp, the base of logging operations in the woods.

The Sugar Pine Railroad railway was built at a consistent 4.5 percent grade that wound through a series of sixty-two 20-degree curves. This required the Sugar Pine Railroad to run a different set of 2-8-2T locomotives where the water is carried in tanks mounted on the engine to increase tractive power. Between Bass Lake and Central Camp there are no places where the railroad grade is flat or opposite grade. This allowed for an easy descent. Loaded timber trains could coast all the way to the mill, requiring a locomotive only for braking. This requirement added several miles to the serpentine route. The train from Central Camp to the mill in Pinedale took about 16 to 18 hours, carrying around 80 cars of logs per trip.

From Central Camp, 150 mi (240 km) of logging rails were laid to reach outlying timber tracts. Fifty trestles were required to span the steep terrain. Trestle Number 14 was the highest at 110 feet (34 m) feet high.

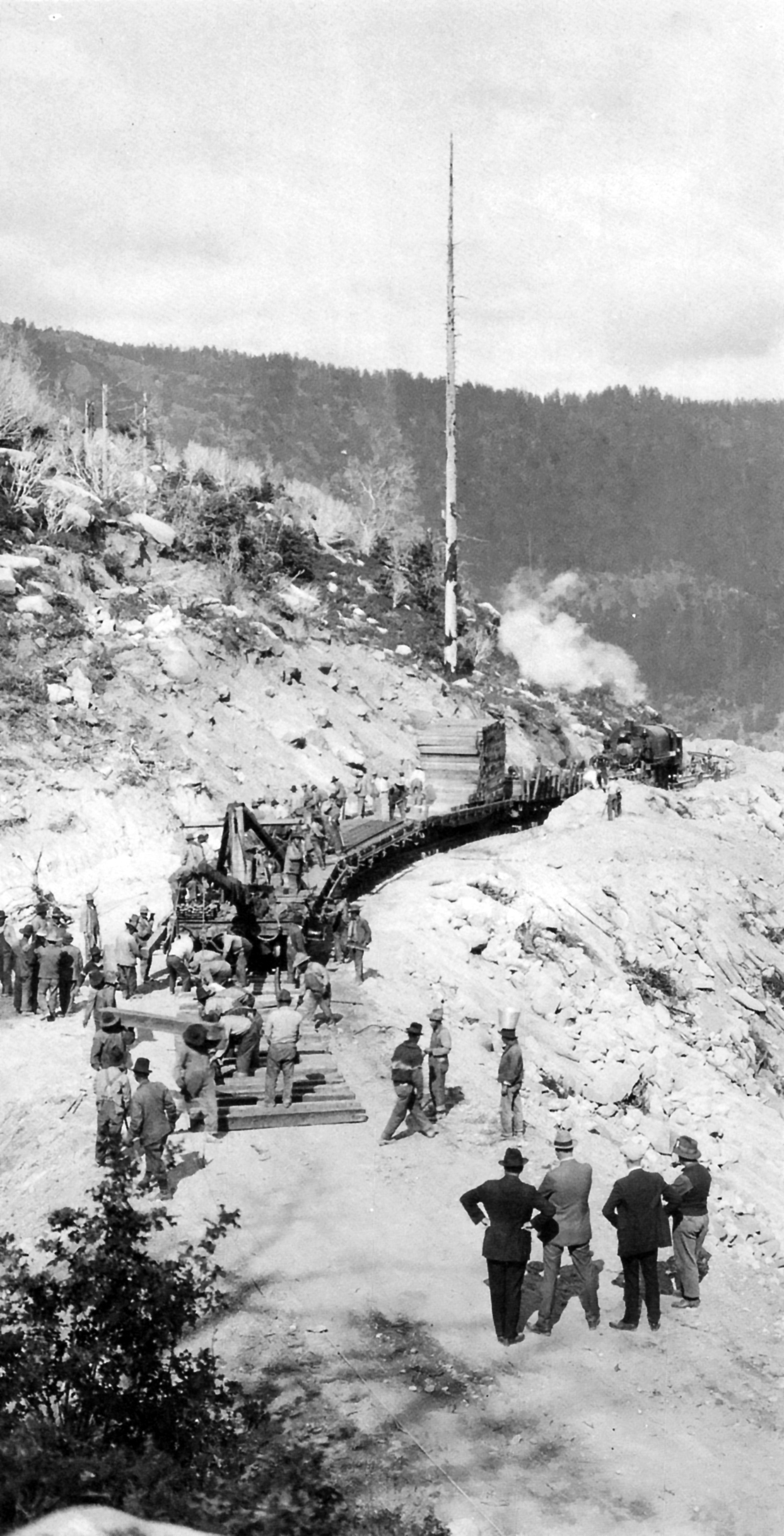
Track laying.

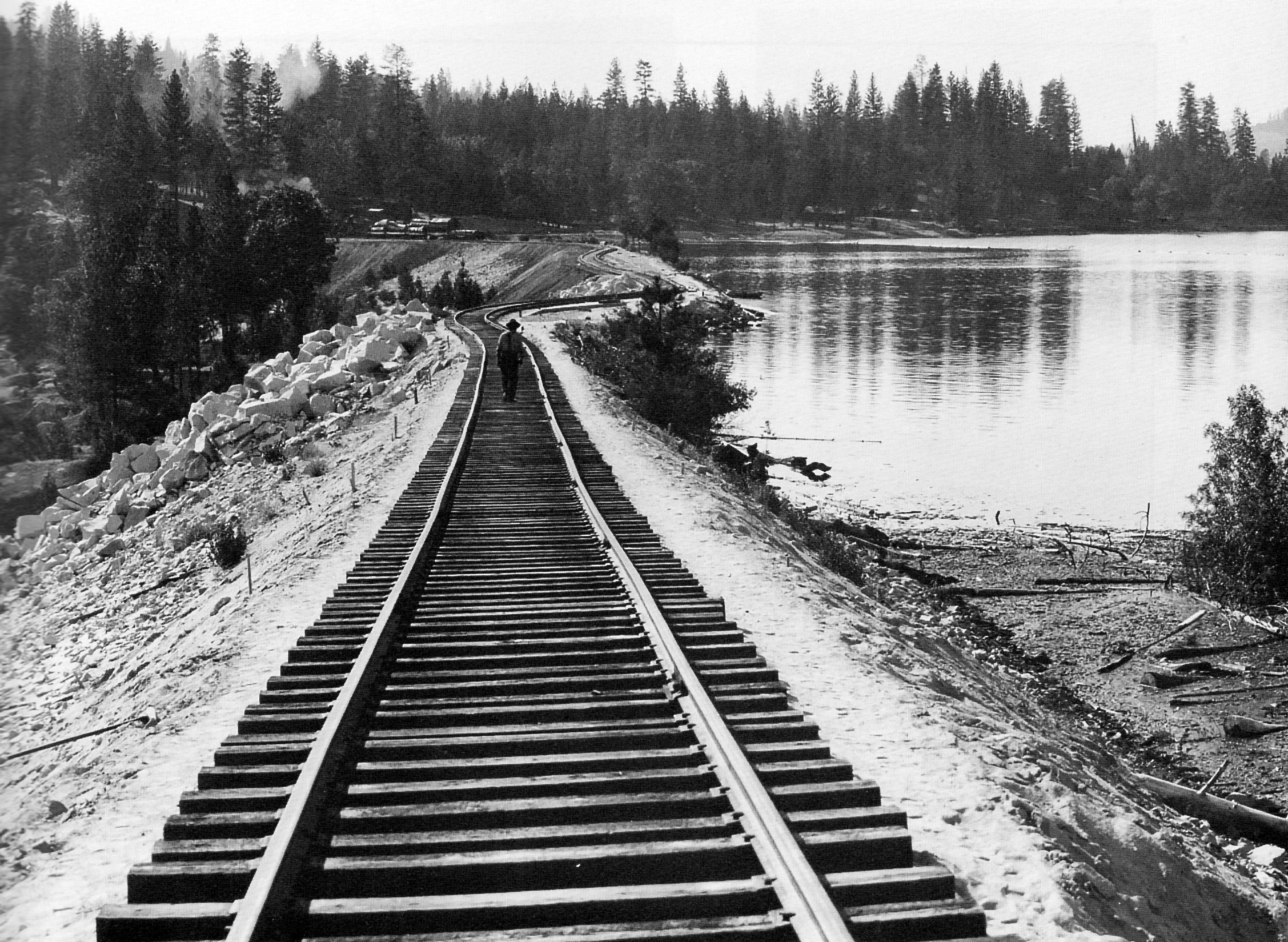
Tracks across Bass Lake Dam.

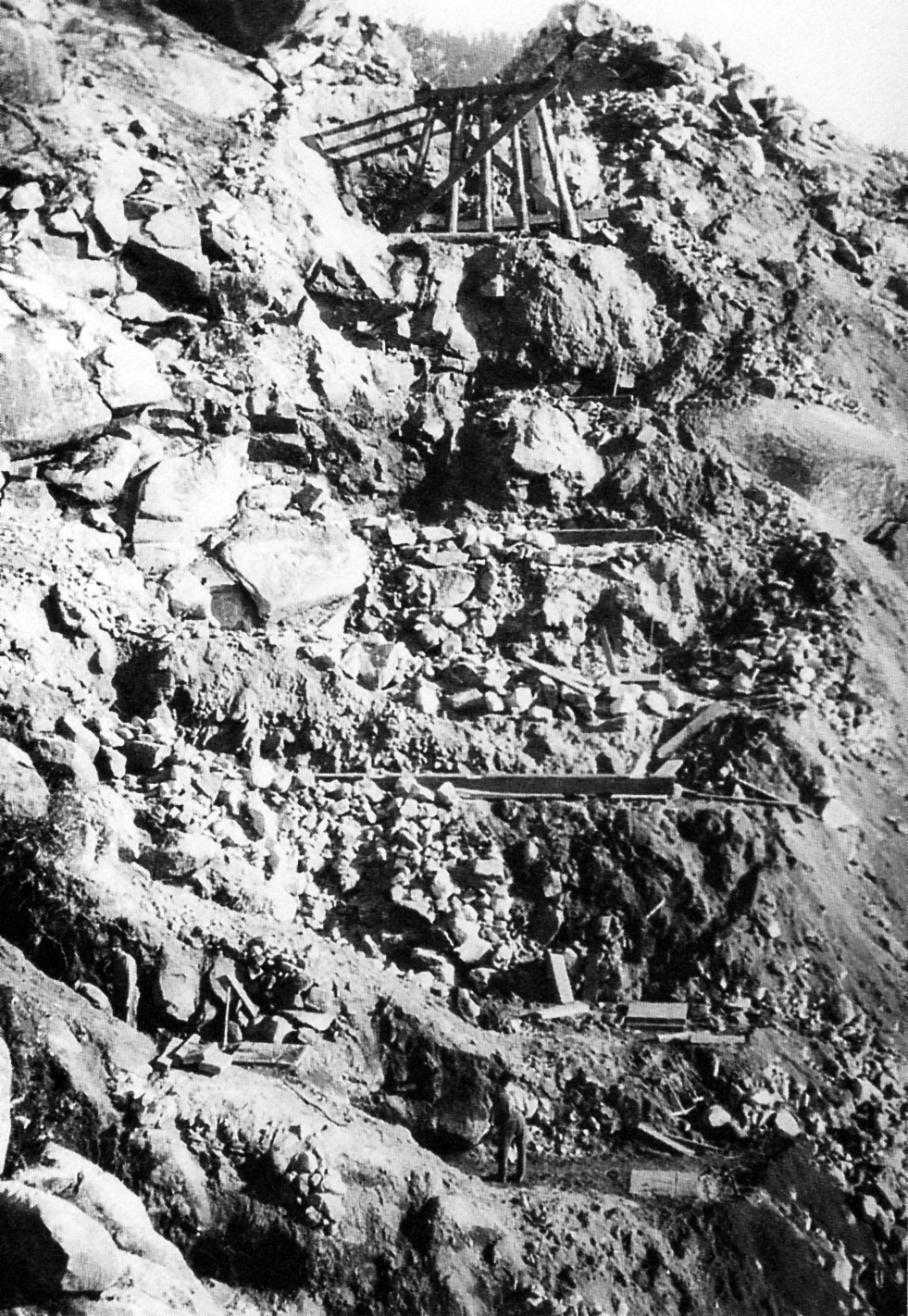
Trestle footings.

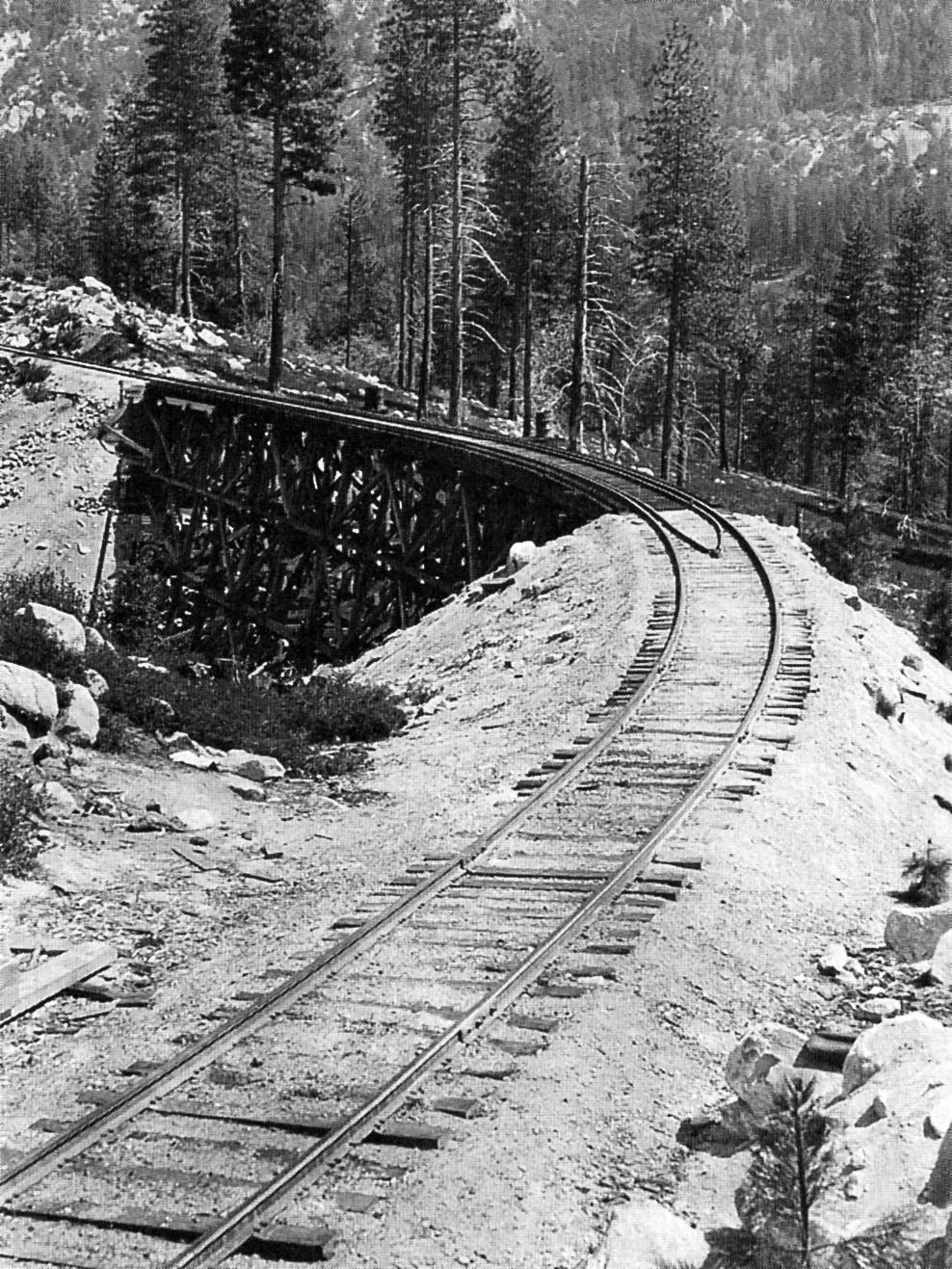
Trestle 1.

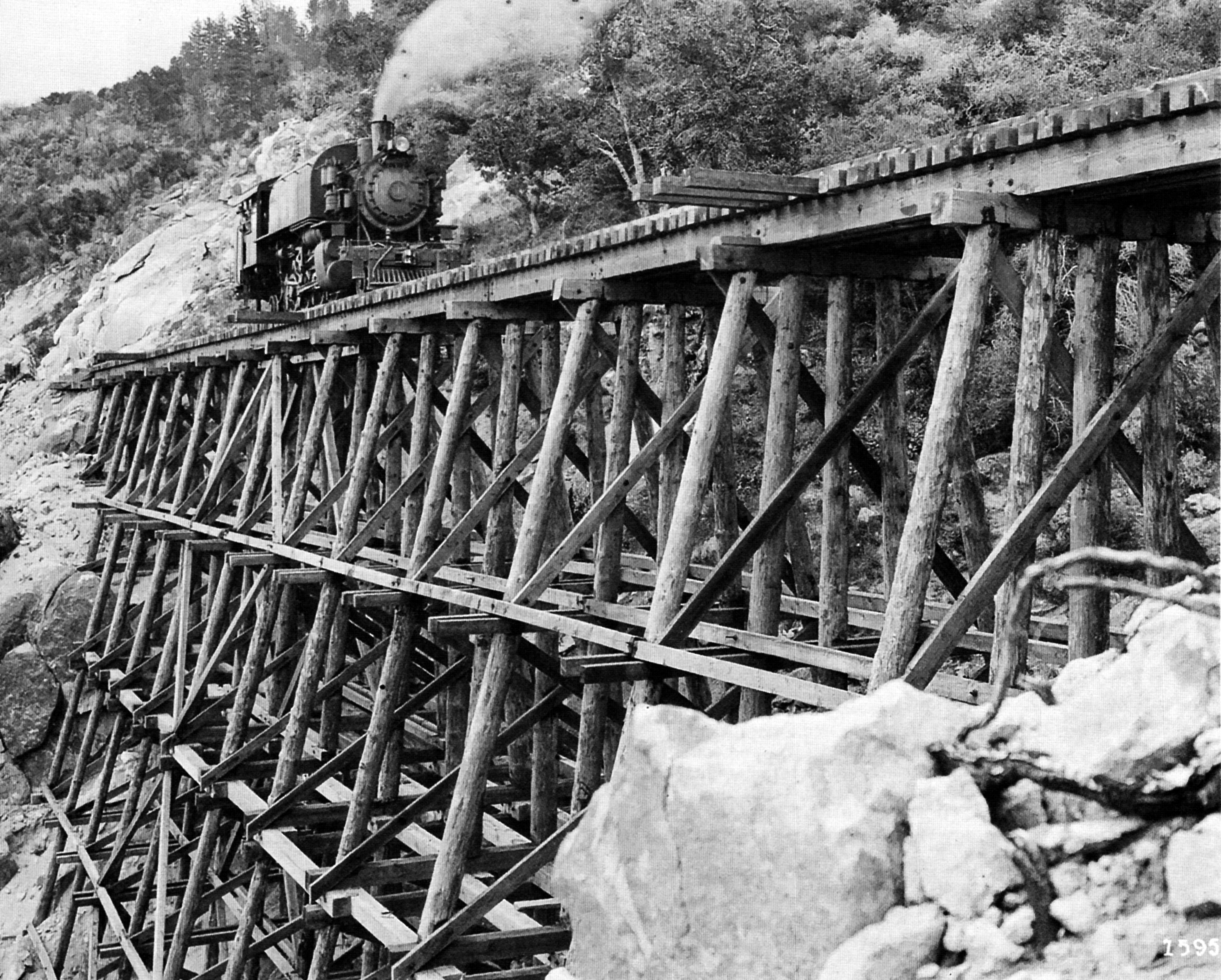
Locomotive 1 on Trestle

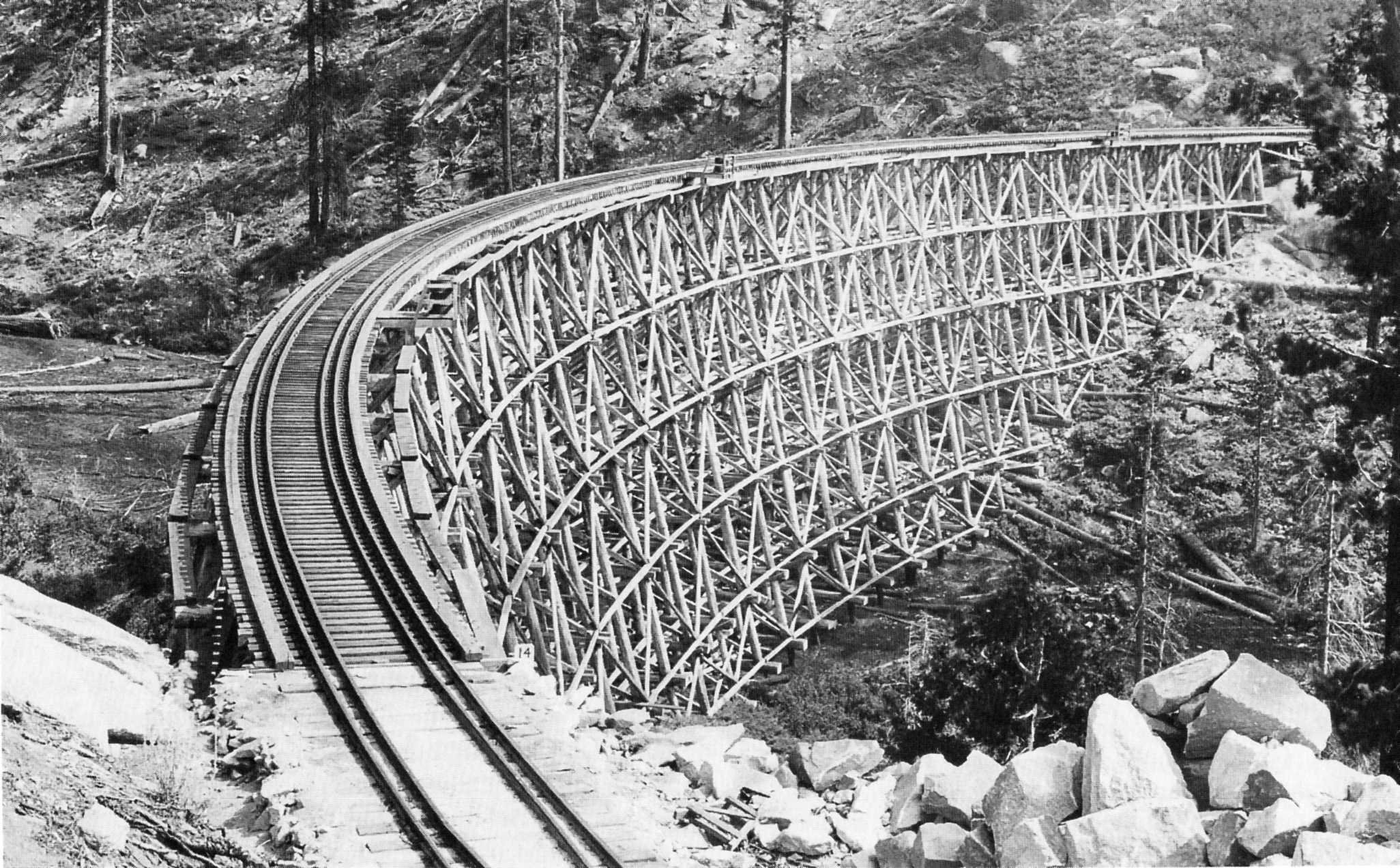
Trestle Number 14.

== Rolling stock ==
=== Locomotives ===
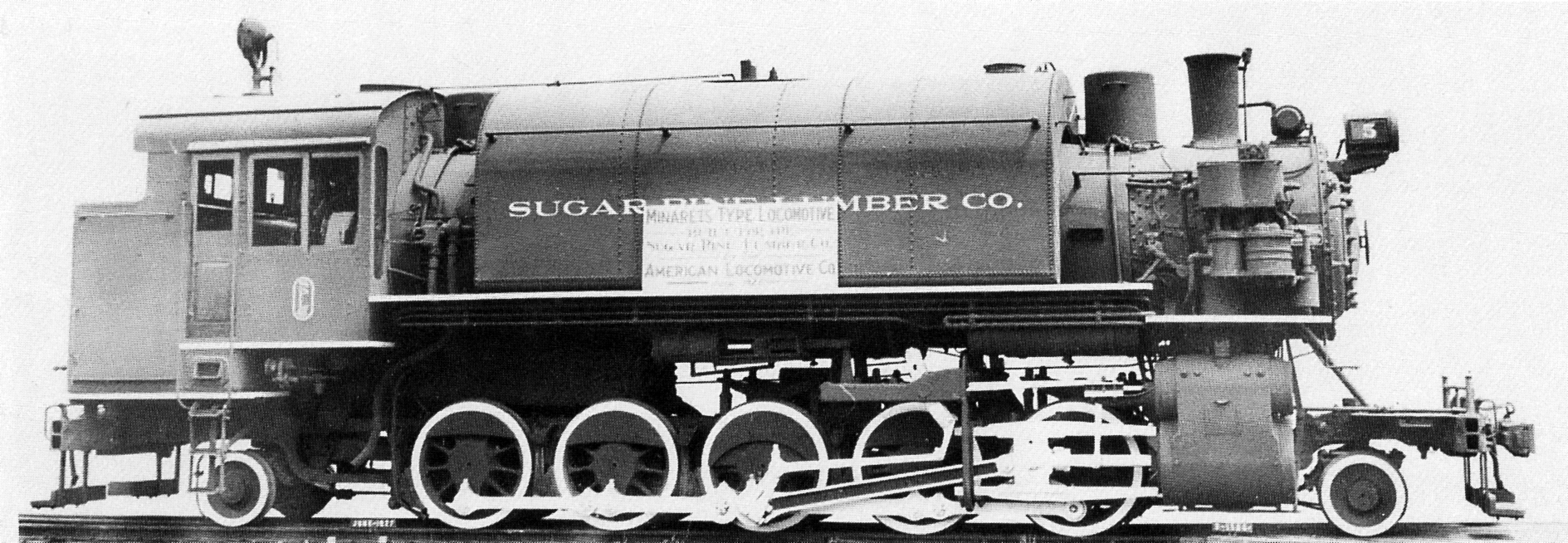
Minarets and Western American Locomotive Company Number 5 Builders Photograph

Sugar Pine Railroad Company used custom-built 2-8-2T Mikado engines from American Locomotive Company. The water tank sat over the boiler. This added more weight over the wheels for better adhesion on climbs. It also allowed the engine to run equally well forward and backward.

From Bass Lake up to Central Camp, because of the steep 4.5% grade, the Mikado engines could only pull twelve cars at once. This meant that three trips were required to get a full thirty-five-car train up. Often this meant that trains ran overnight to keep ahead. The company added two more similarly specified Mikado locomotives as they began cutting further out lumber tracts.

In 1927, Sugar Pine ordered a unique tank locomotive, designated a Minaret engine after the nearby mountain peaks. It was the most powerful saddle tank locomotive ever made and forty-percent heavier than their Mikado engines. With two pony trucks, ten drivers, and two trailer trucks it could pull about twenty-five cars up the grade.

The massive saddle-tank locomotives proved to be overbuilt for the application in the woods. Lighter, geared Shay locomotives could negotiate sharper curves over lighter roadbeds with significantly lower operating costs.

=== Flat cars ===
While different locomotives were used, the Minarets and Western and Sugar Pine Lumber Company shared the same 200 standard-gauge flatbed cars. Six all-steel flatbed moving cars were used in the woods to transport electric logging equipment. Each day, lumberjacks used flatbed cars to travel from Central Camp to more remote worksites. This arrangement was called “The Man Train.”

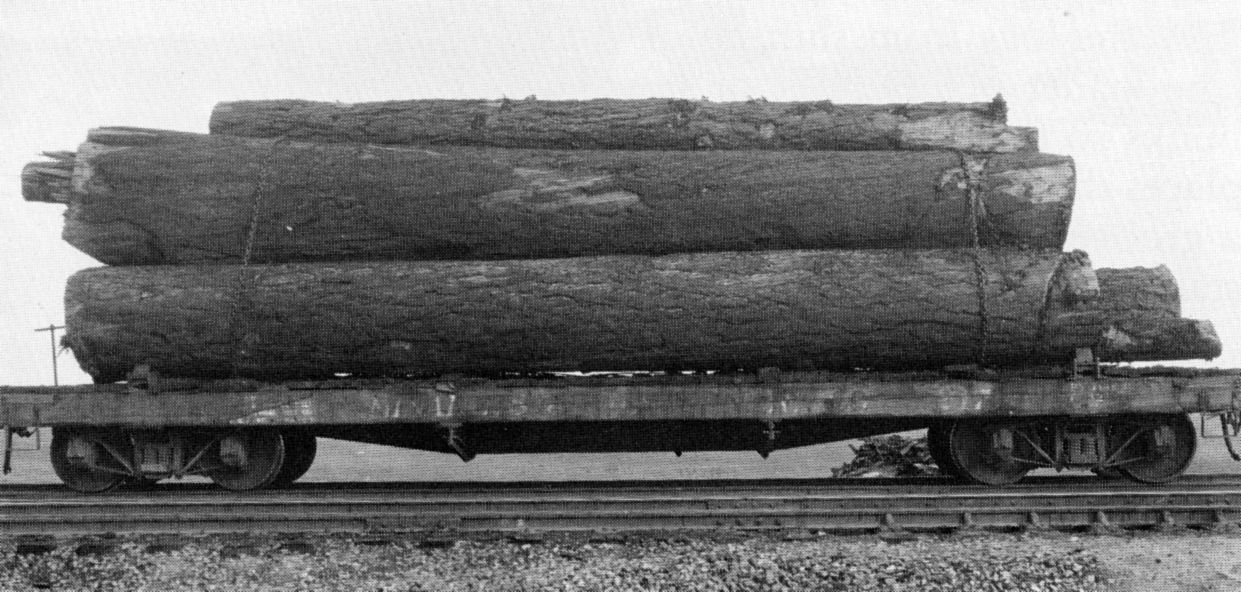
Wood Flatcar.

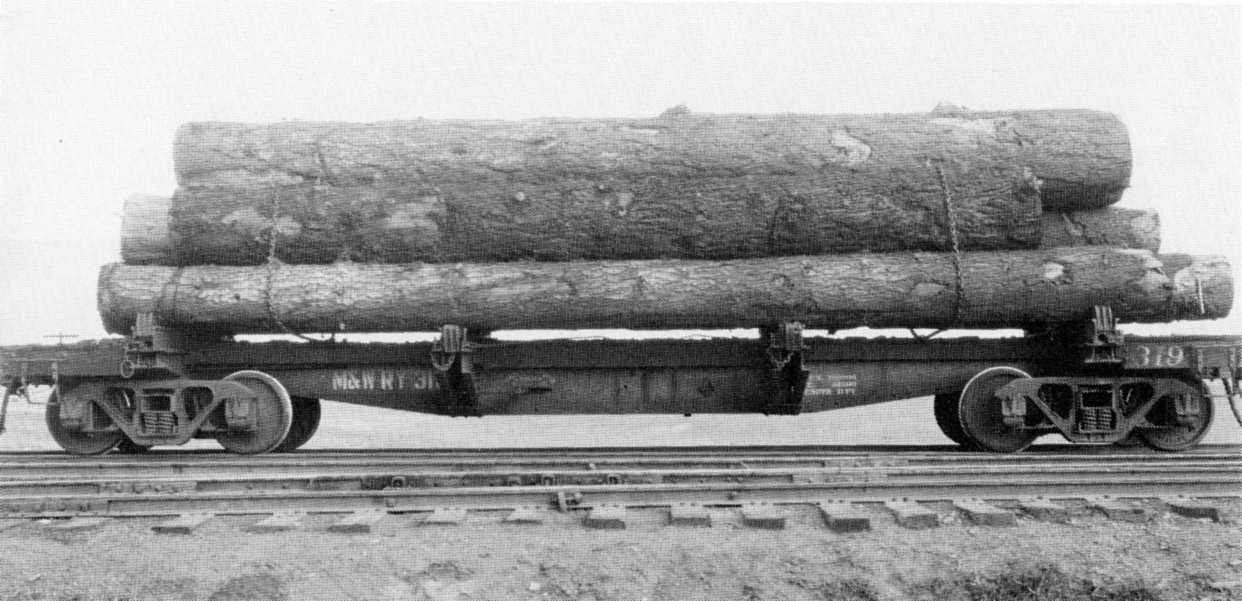
Steel Flatcar.

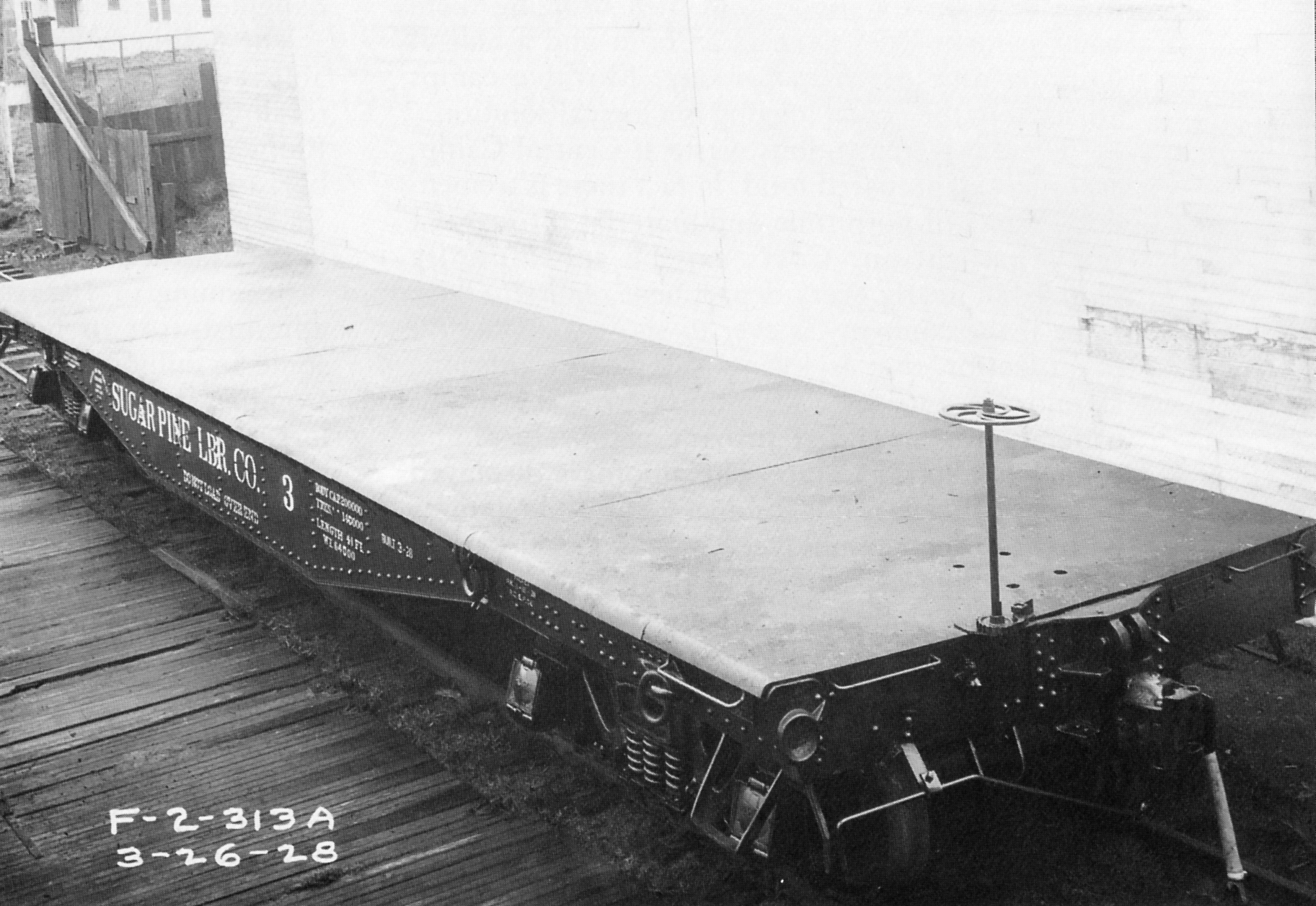
Steel Flat Car.

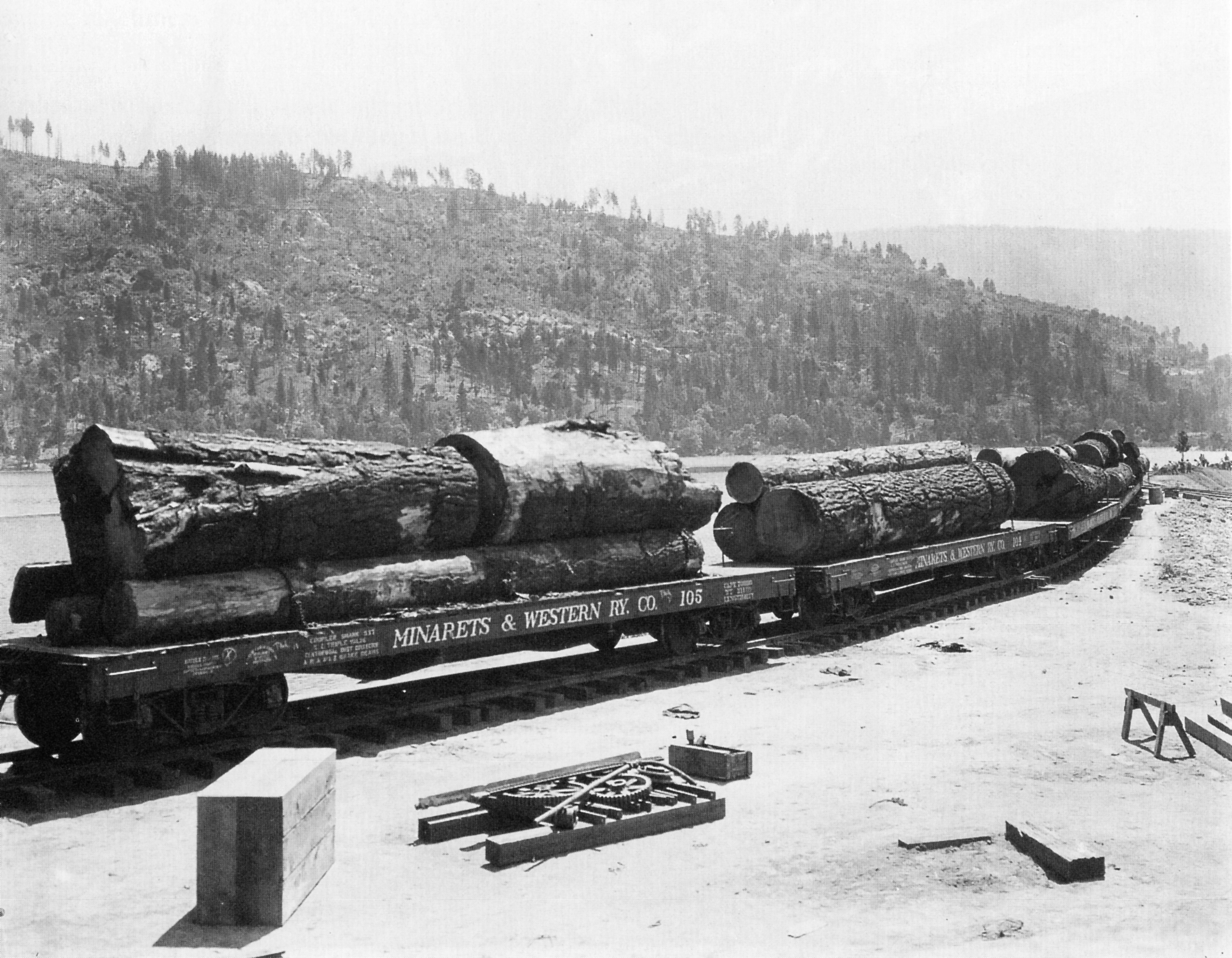
Log Cars at Bass Lake.

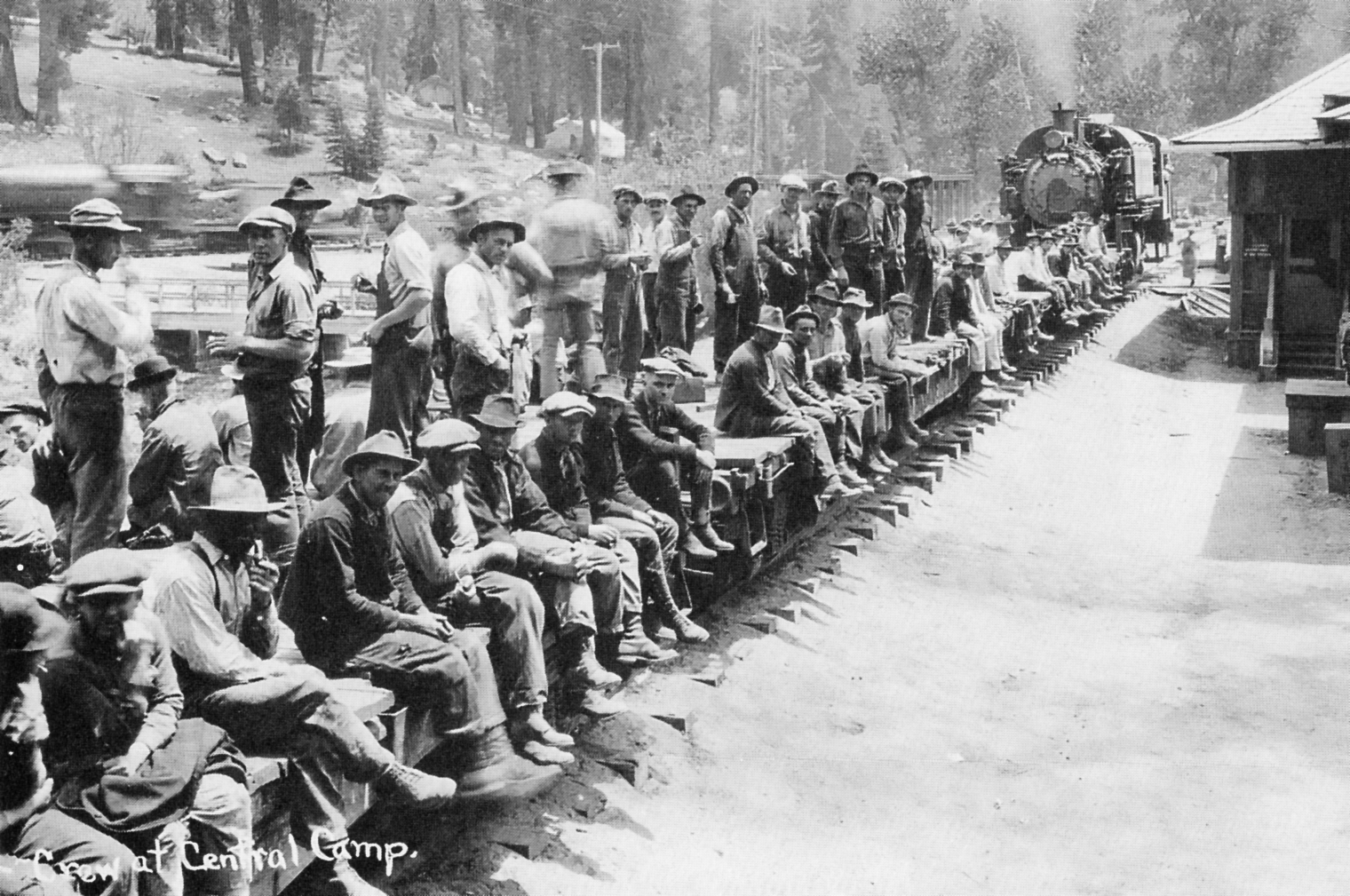
The "Man Train."

== Logging ==
=== Central Camp ===
Central Camp was the Sugar Pine Lumber Company's base of logging operations supporting five hundred people living together in the woods. This included single lumberjacks living in group dormitories, lumberjacks and their families living in detached cabins, as well as railroad and construction workers, cooks, teachers, doctors and other seasonal support staff.

Sparing little expense, it was the industry's finest, costliest and most modern logging camp. The Fresno Republican covered the camp's grand opening in 1923, which stood in stark contrast to primitive woods camps. The Republican reported:

Central Camp, the little capital of the sugar pine hills, is hidden away in a grove of towering trees. Huge buildings have been erected that are substantial enough to stand for 75 years or more, even in the trying weather that exists during the winter when snow piles up from six to eight feet high. Two of the buildings have fully as large a floor space as the Fresno Auditorium. From garage to hospital, this lumber city is the most modern of any in the world, the builders claim. To the visitor, the contention is substantiated when a tour of the ‘city limits’ is made. Comforts and conveniences that would be found at the country’s finest summer resorts are in evidence everywhere.

Built at a cost of $600,000, the investment was elaborate for what was ultimately a transitory work site. A hydroelectric plant supplied the town with electricity for lighting and cooking. A large central boiler provided the living quarters with steam heat. Lumberjacks returned by train to Central Camp for the midday meal prepared by a large cook staff. Meals features fresh produce that was brought into the mountains by refrigerator car. Entertainment included a theater, recreation hall and a boxing ring. Operating during the Prohibition era, Central Camp did not have a saloon. However, whiskey was occasionally bootlegged in.

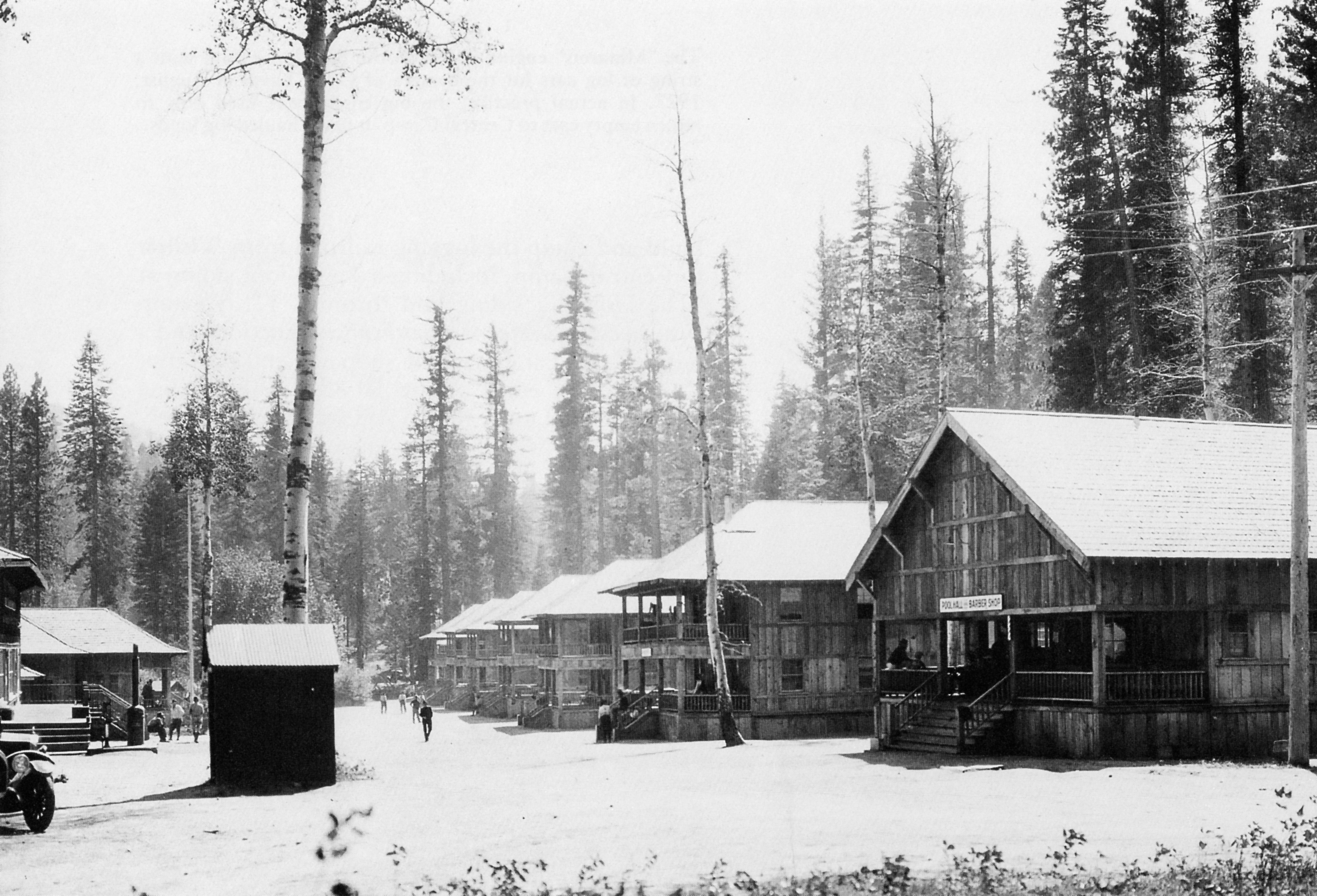
Main Street

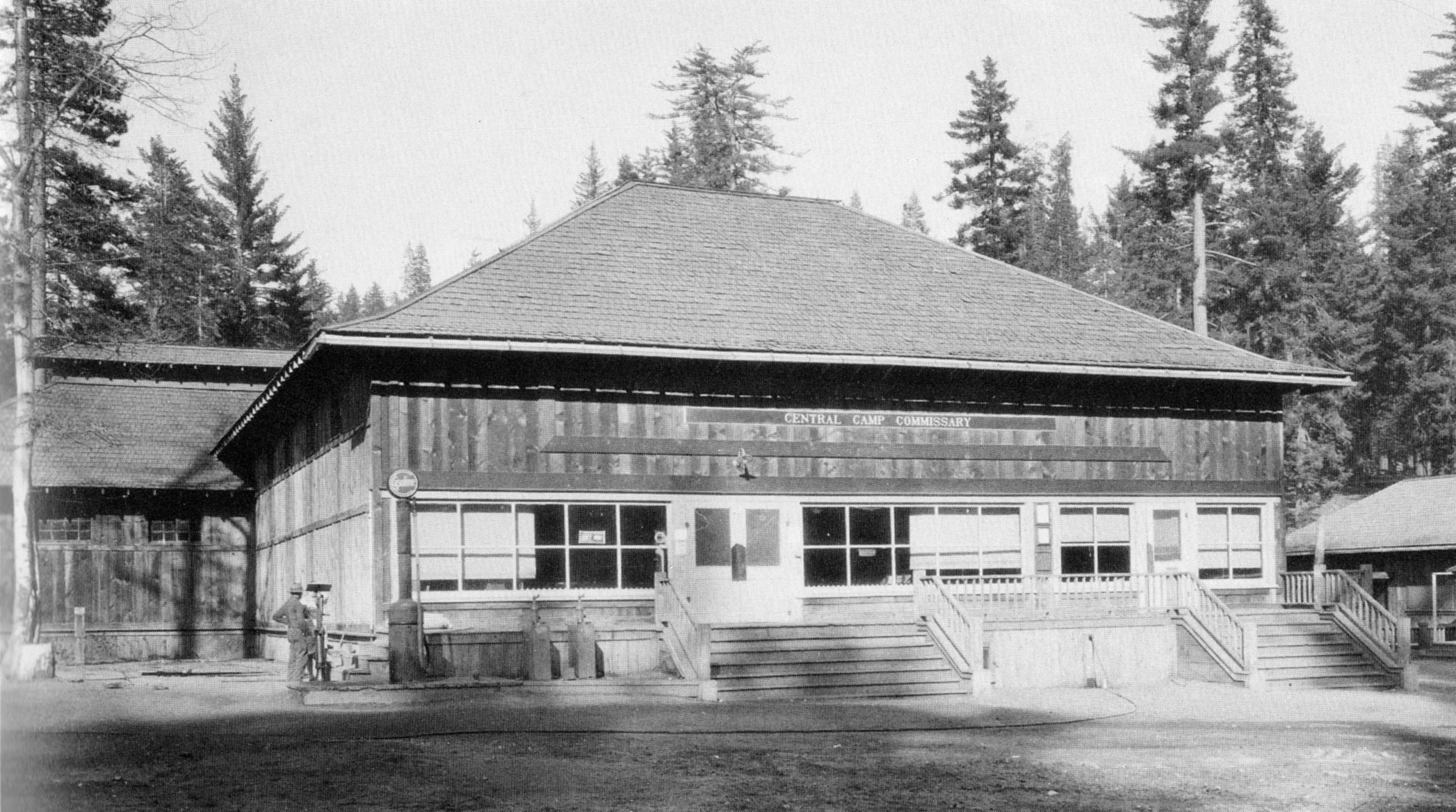
Commissary

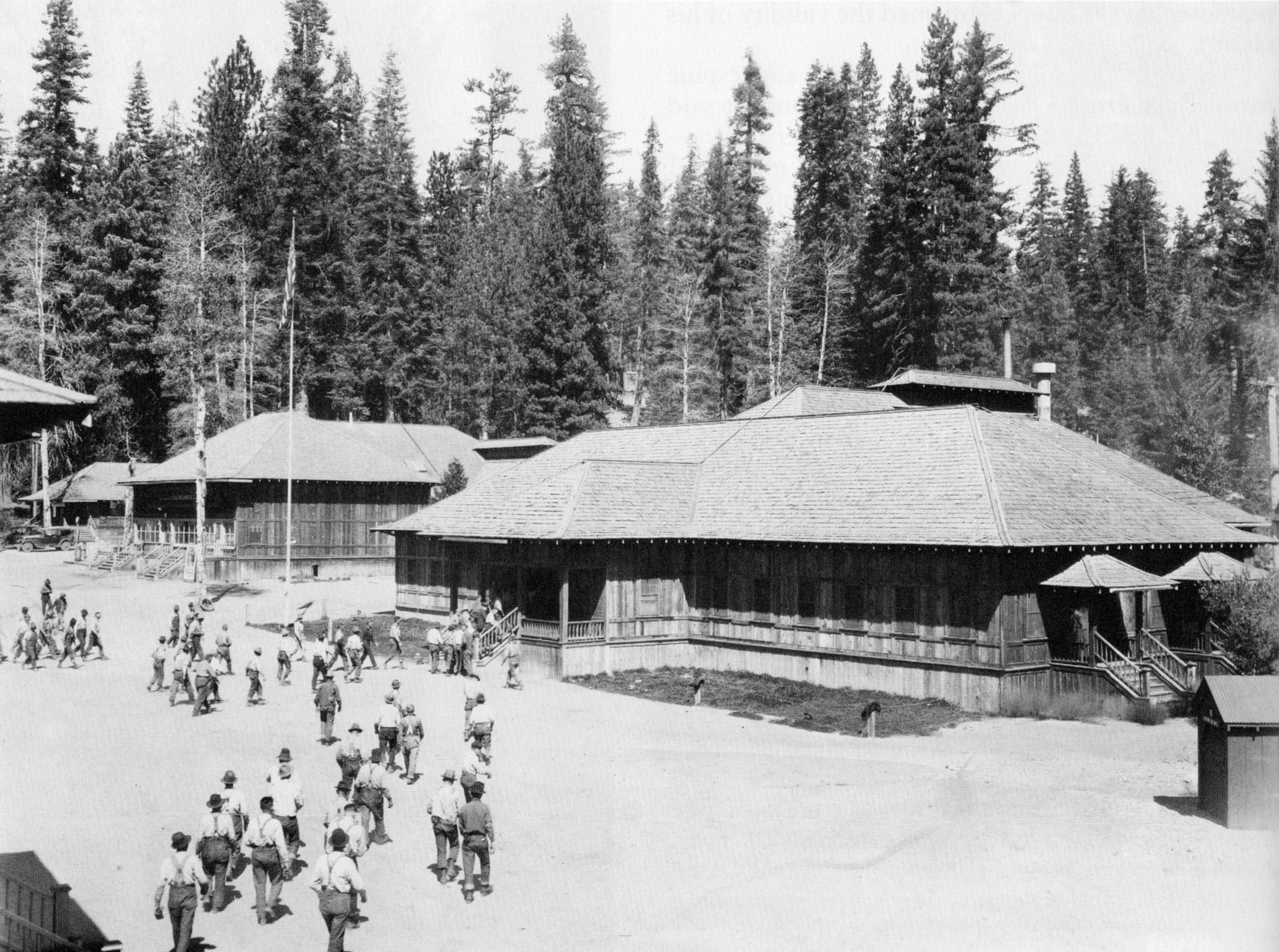
Cookhouse

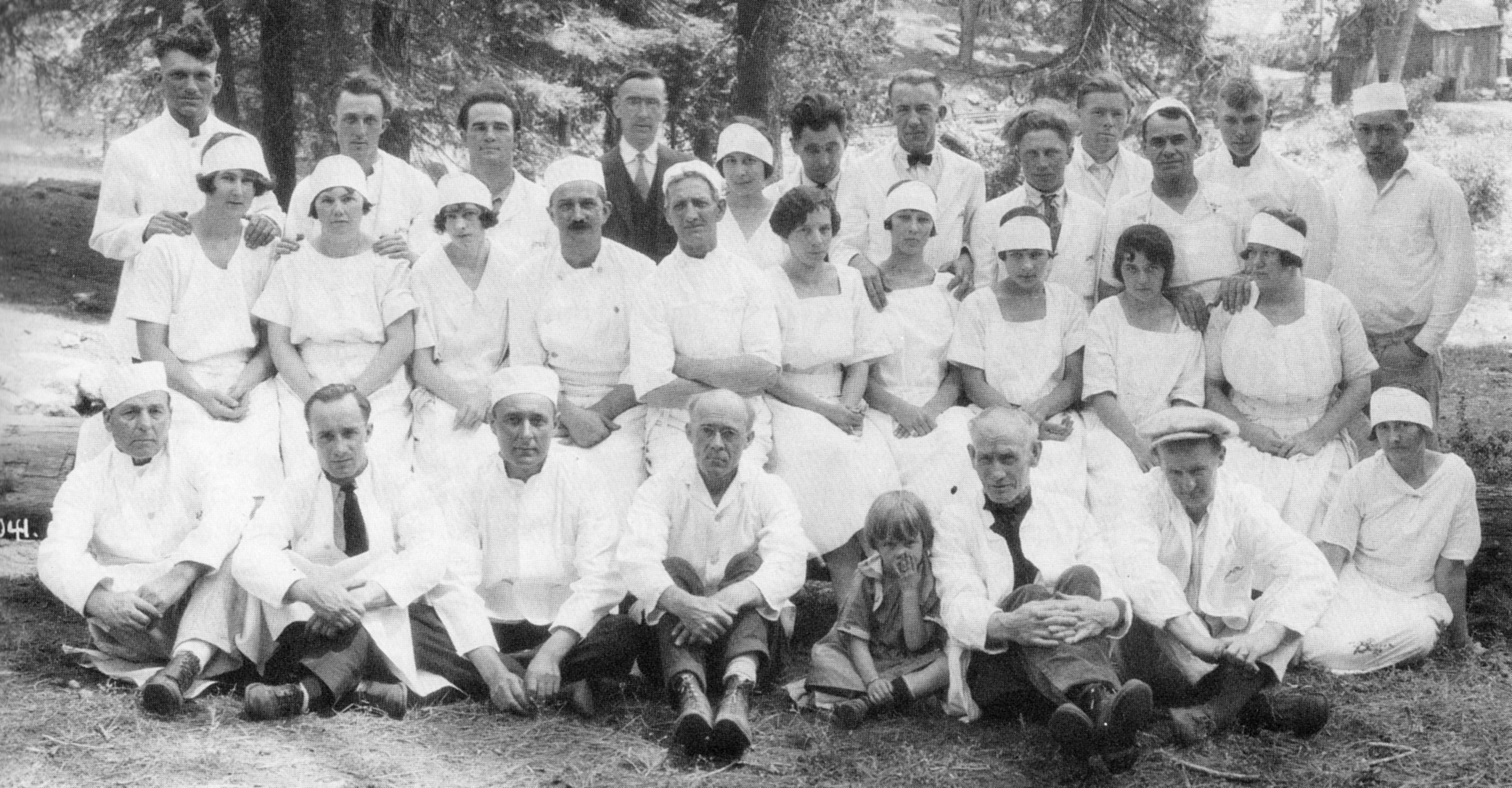
Cookhouse Staff

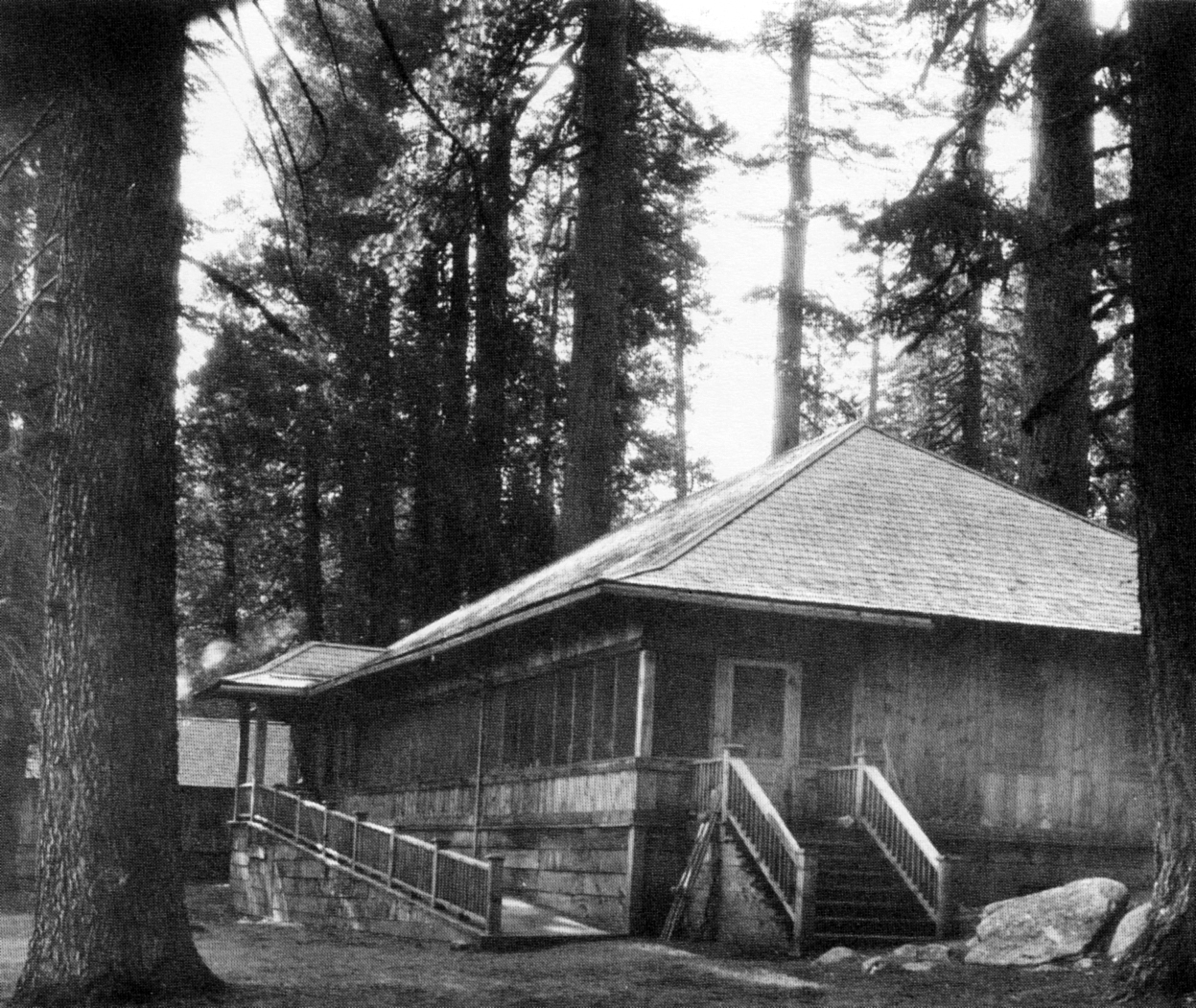
Hospital

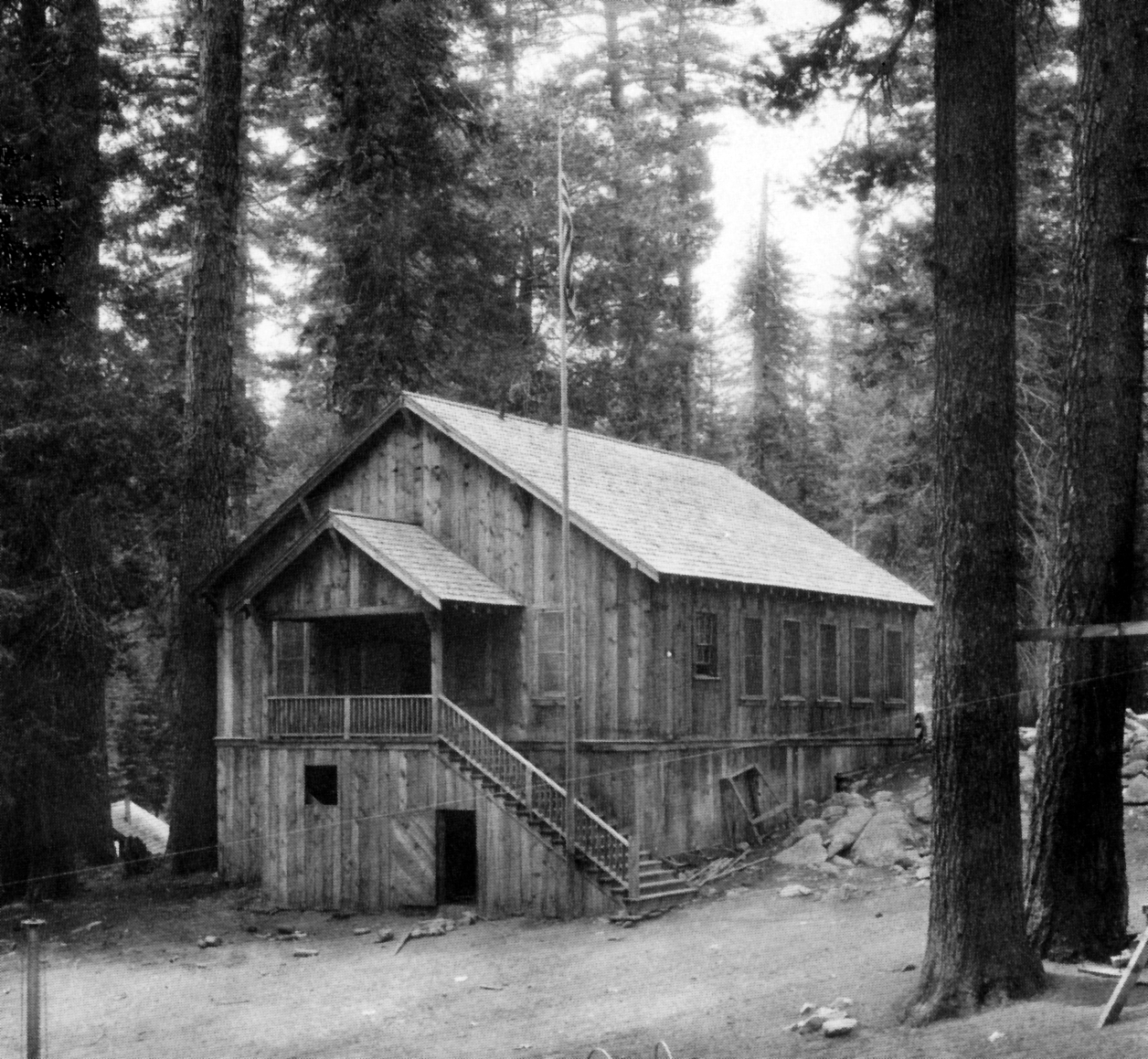
School

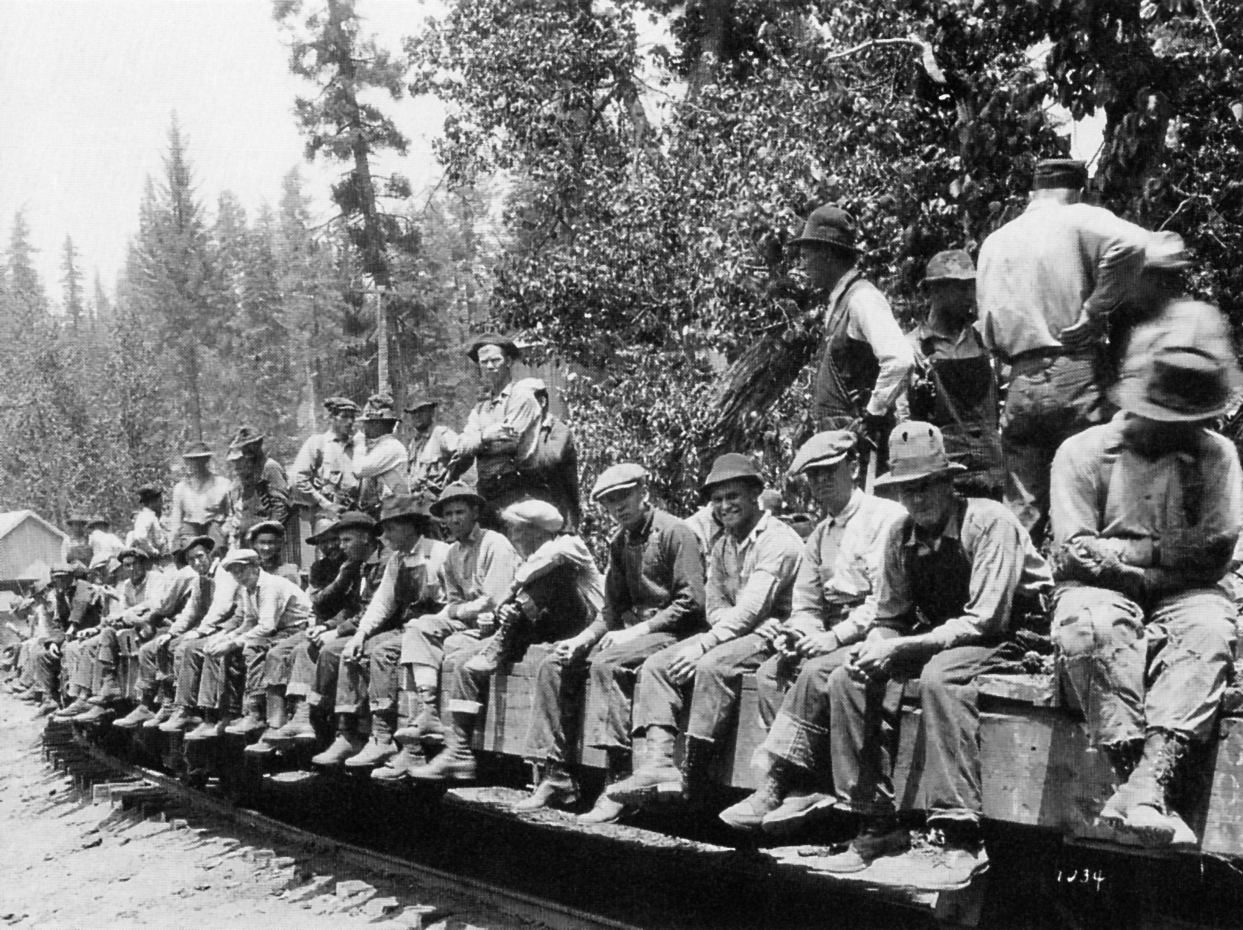
Man Train Lunch.

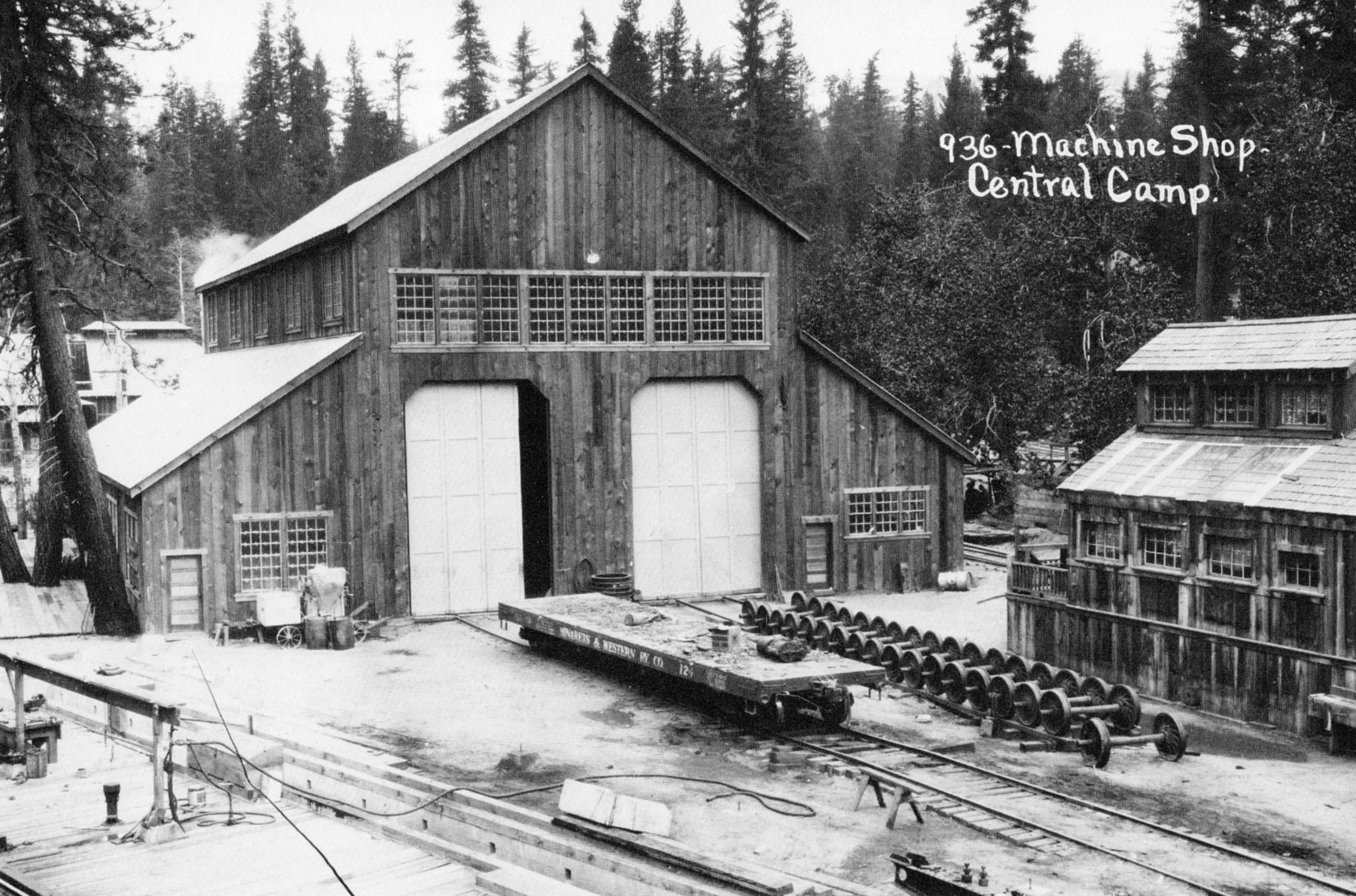
Machine Shop

=== Electric power ===
Sugar Pine Lumber was one of the few large operations where the primary logging equipment was electrically driven. Earlier operations made extensive use of the steam donkey, which transformed the industry in the 1880s. Later operations transitioned to modern-day truck logging. Electricity was preferable to steam for several reasons. Electricity greatly reduced the risk of forest fire, did not require a supply of water or fuel, and provided instant and continuous power. Power was supplied by San Joaquin Light and Power through high tension wires running from the hydroelectric power station at nearby Bass Lake. As a result, late-season windstorms became a hazard, and sometimes interrupted operations during the fall months. Twelve transformers mounted to donkey sleds allowed power to be deployed anywhere throughout the timber tract. Two 70-ton Willamette railroad logging units were used to pull cut logs to the railroad line.

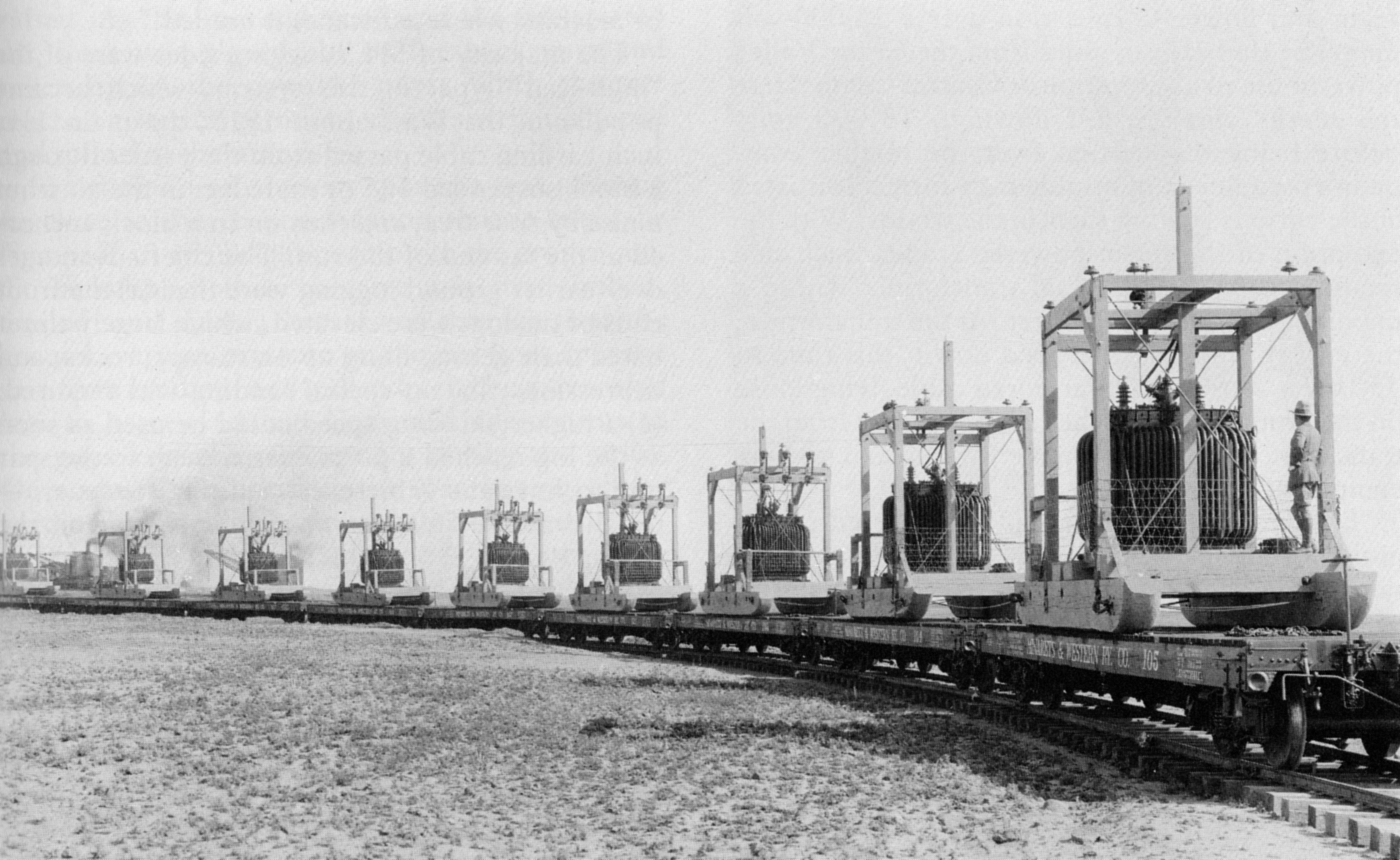
Trainload of transformers.

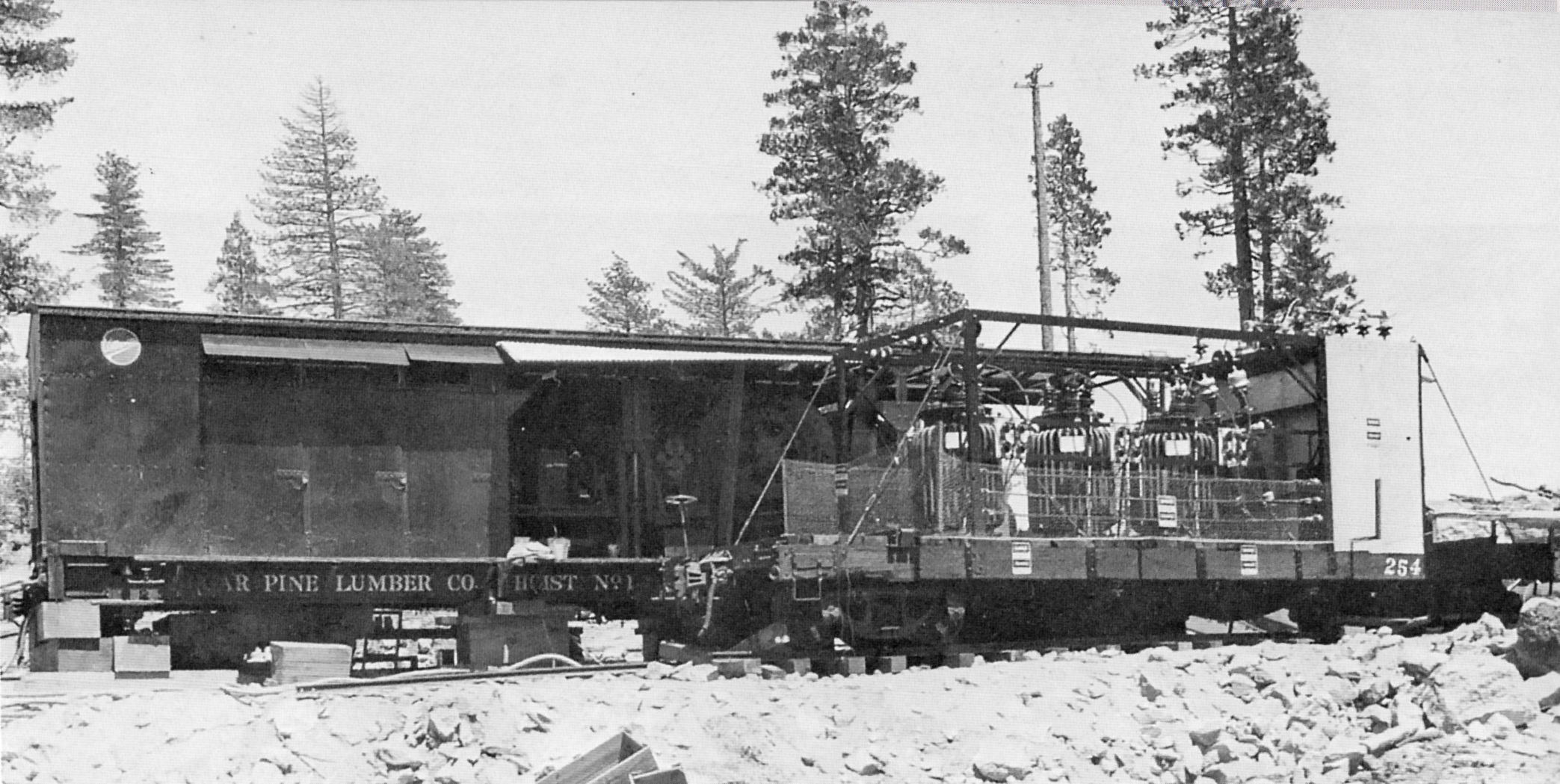
Willamette slope hoist.

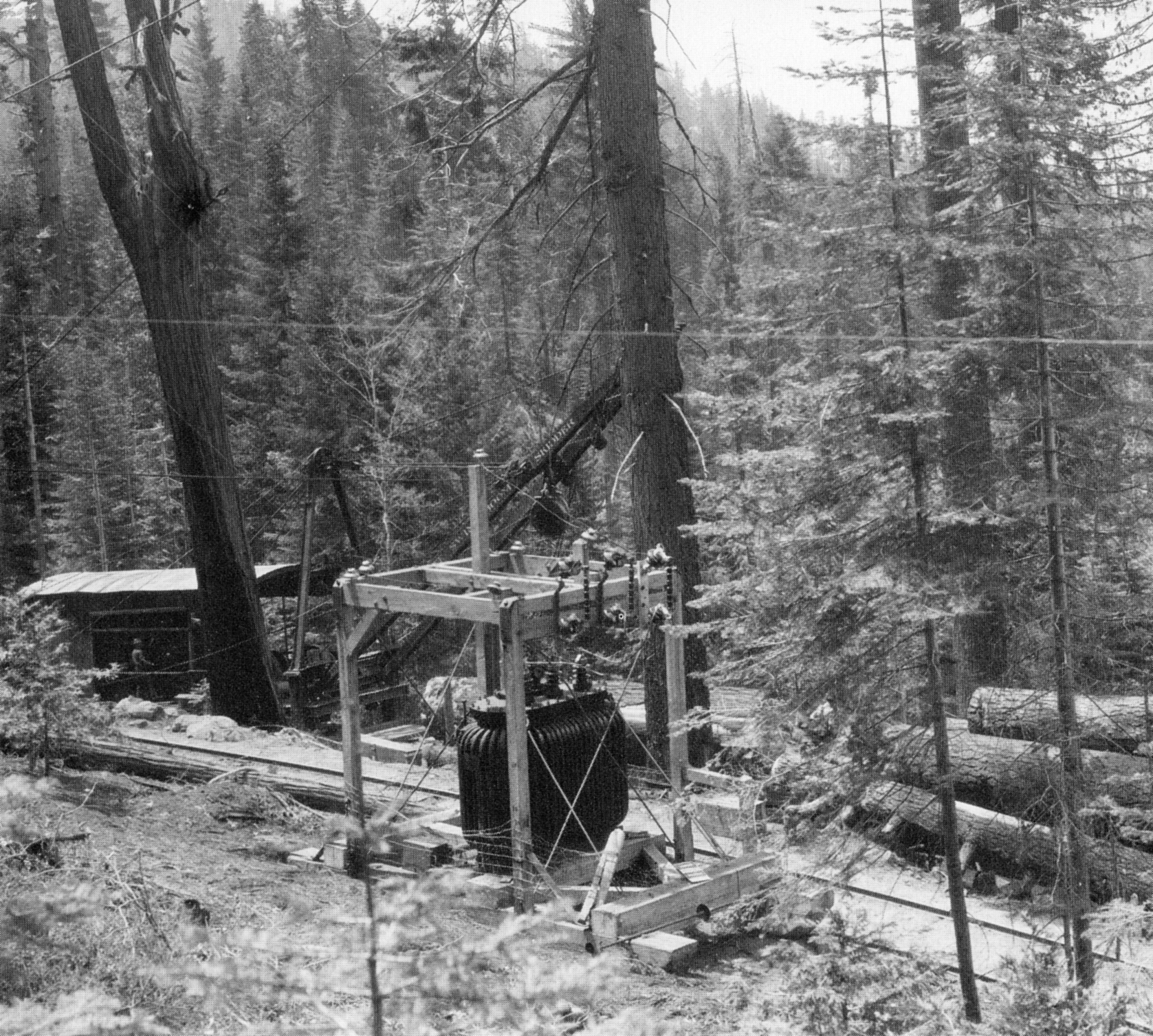
A transformer powering logging equipment.

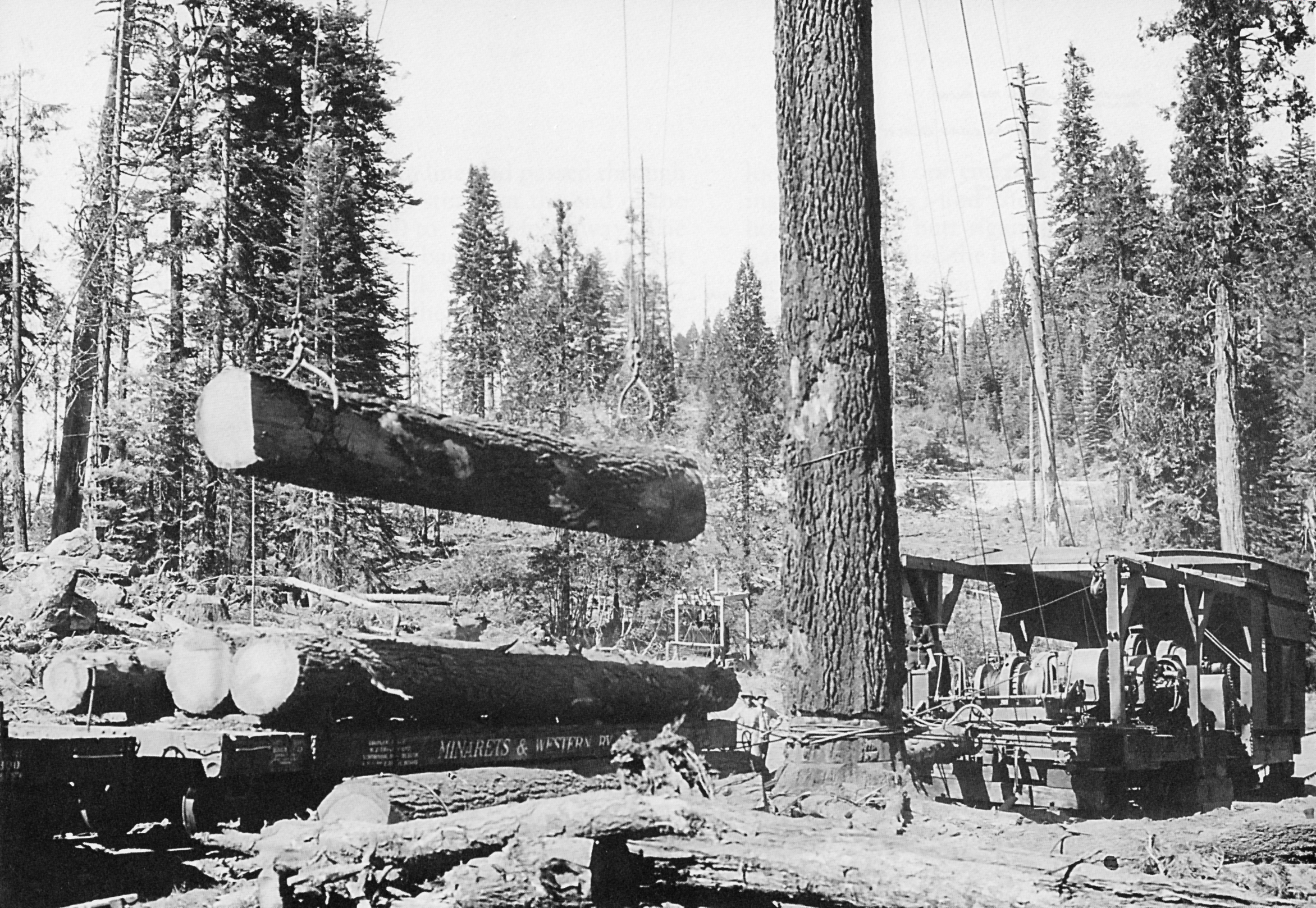
Electric car unit loading crew.

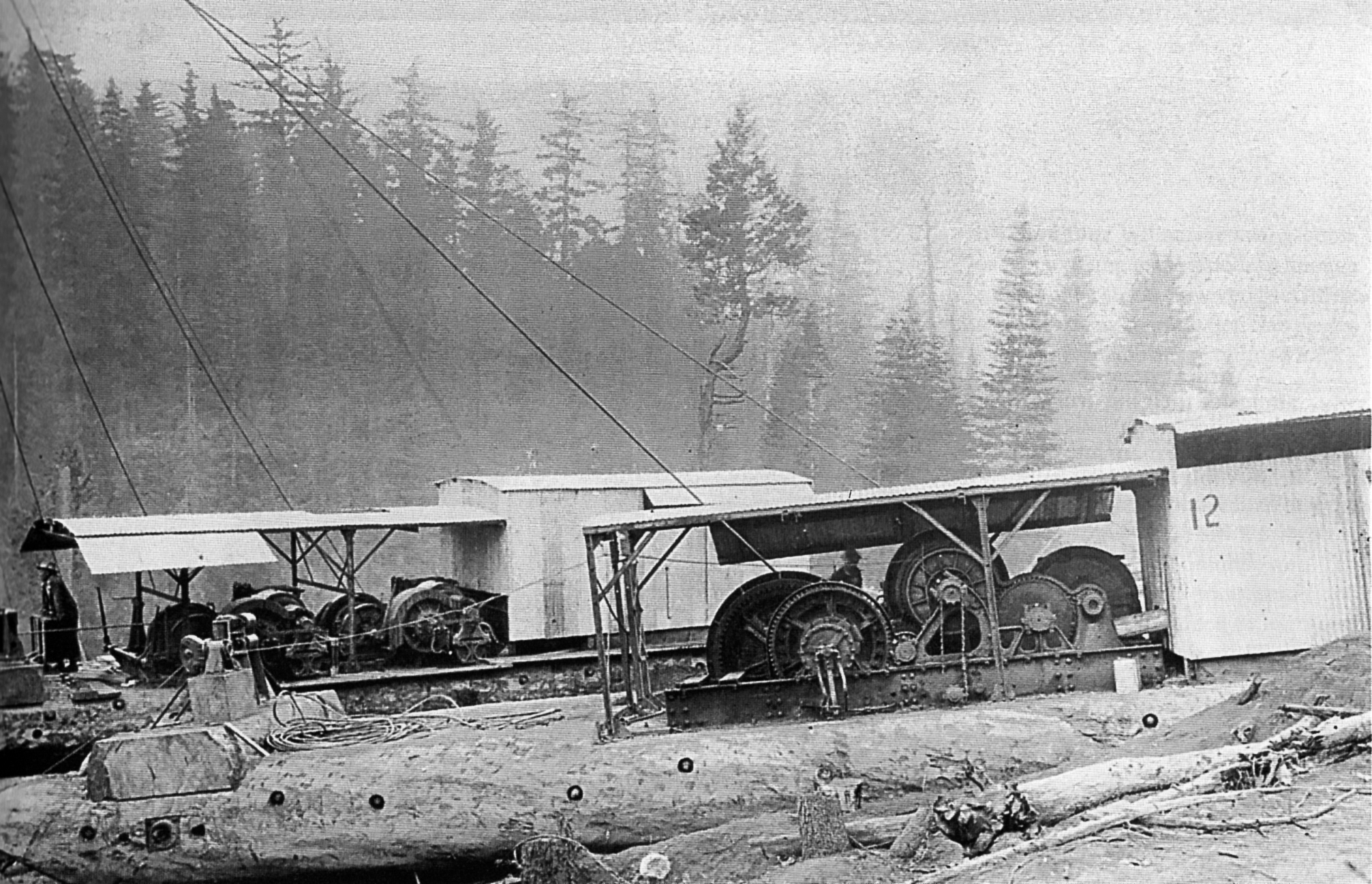
Electric winch punk.

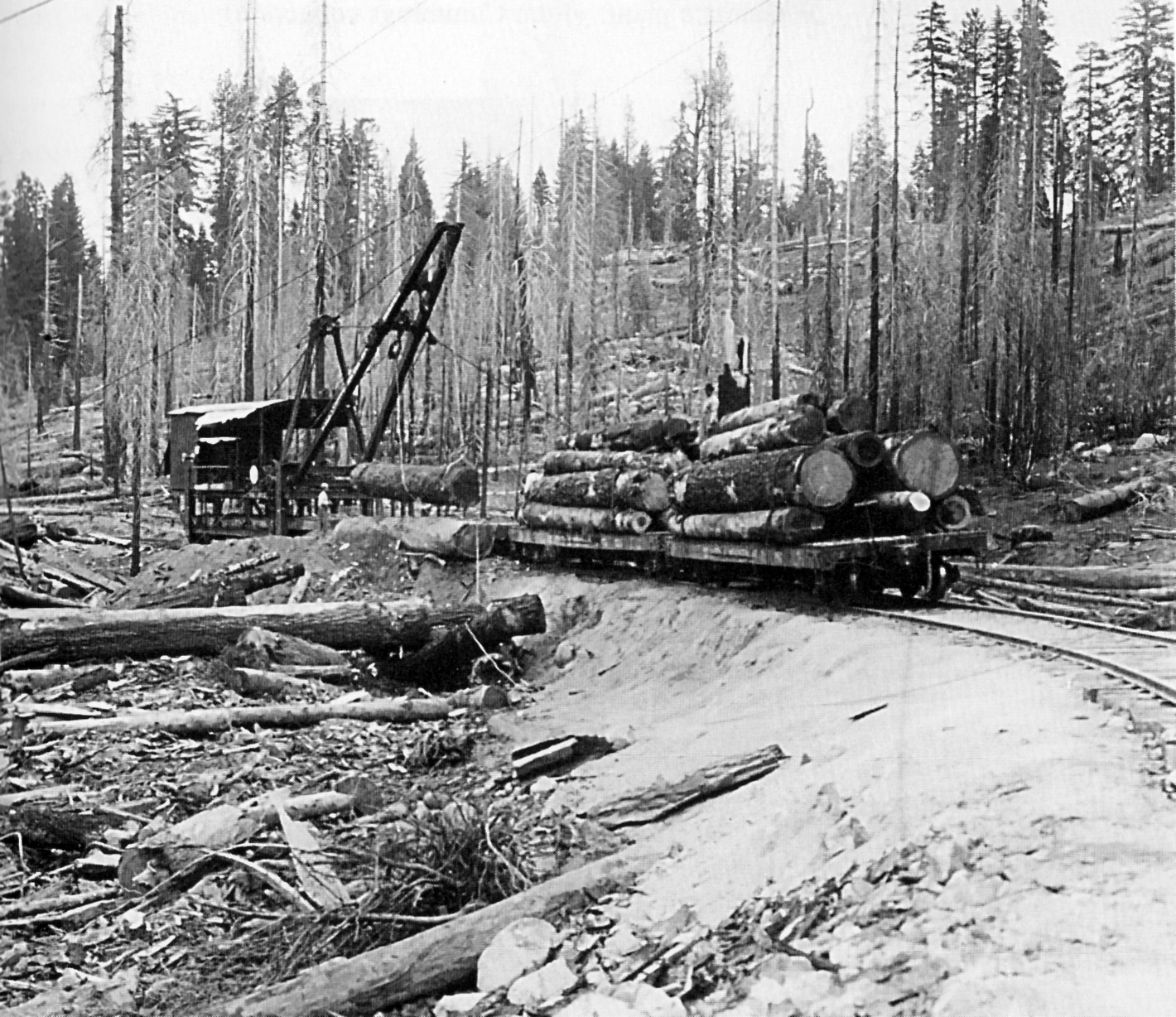
Willamette loader on railway.

== Pinedale Mill ==
The Pinedale Mill was known as the “finest sawmill in the west,” delivering an average cut of 100 million board feet a year. By 1928, it was producing twice as much lumber as its neighboring operation, the Madera Sugar Pine Company. The facility was immense, featuring the world's largest sorting table with room for 230 grades of lumber, in addition to 80 acres (0 km^{2}) of drying yards connected by 40 mi (64 km) of narrow-gauge railroad tracks. During the peak of the season the mill employed 550 men. The mill employed about 250 workers year-round, mostly in the planning mill, box factory and shipping yards.

Approximately 13,000 log cars per season arrived at the mill. The cars were about forty-one feet long and they held about 7,500 board feet of lumber. A normal train was about thirty-five cars and would make a little over 560 tons, keeping the mill busy for two shifts. Logs were unloaded from railroad flat cars into a large log pond. Men worked on floating timbers and sorted the logs by species by pike poles.

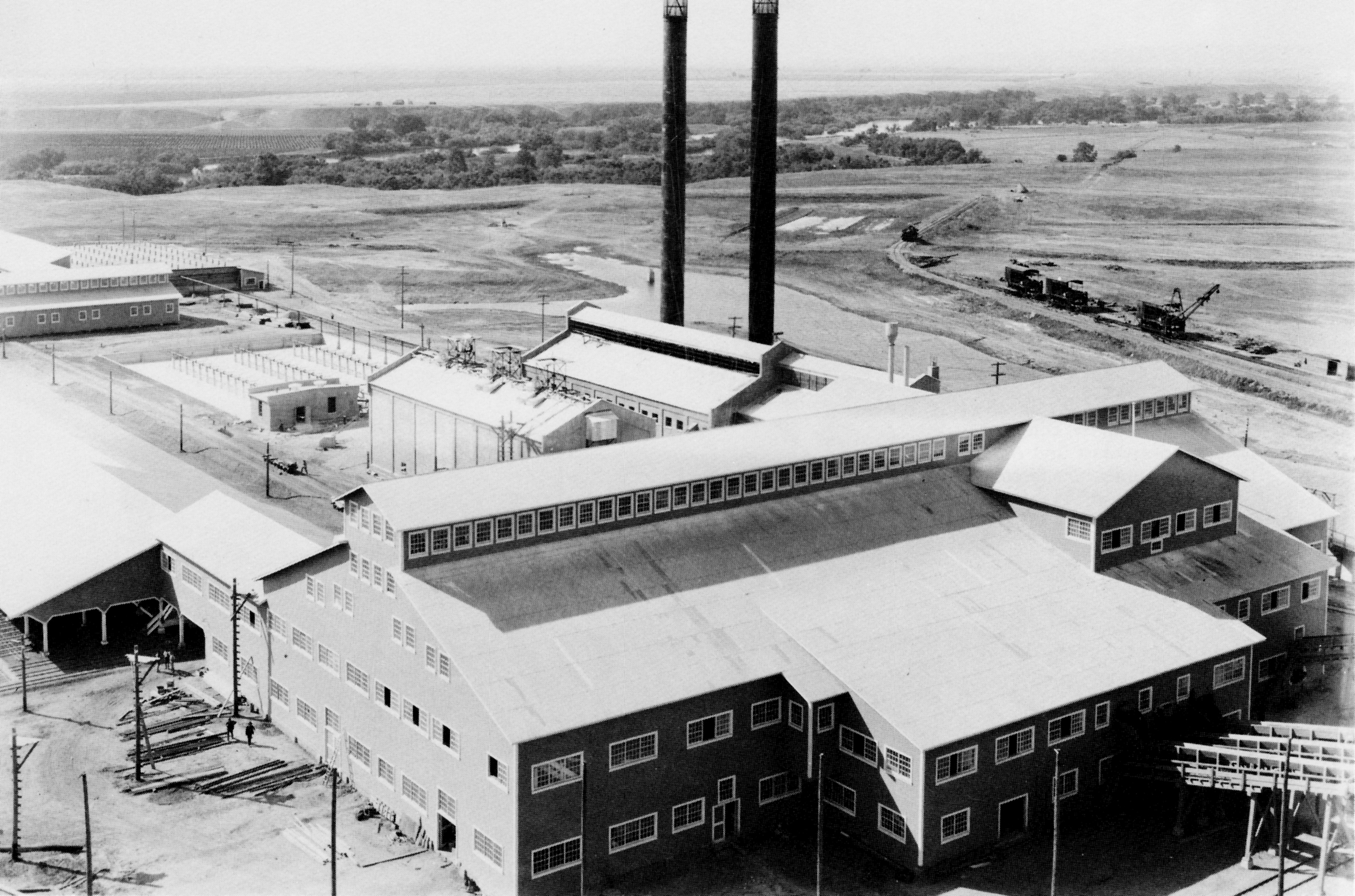
Pinedale Mill overhead view.

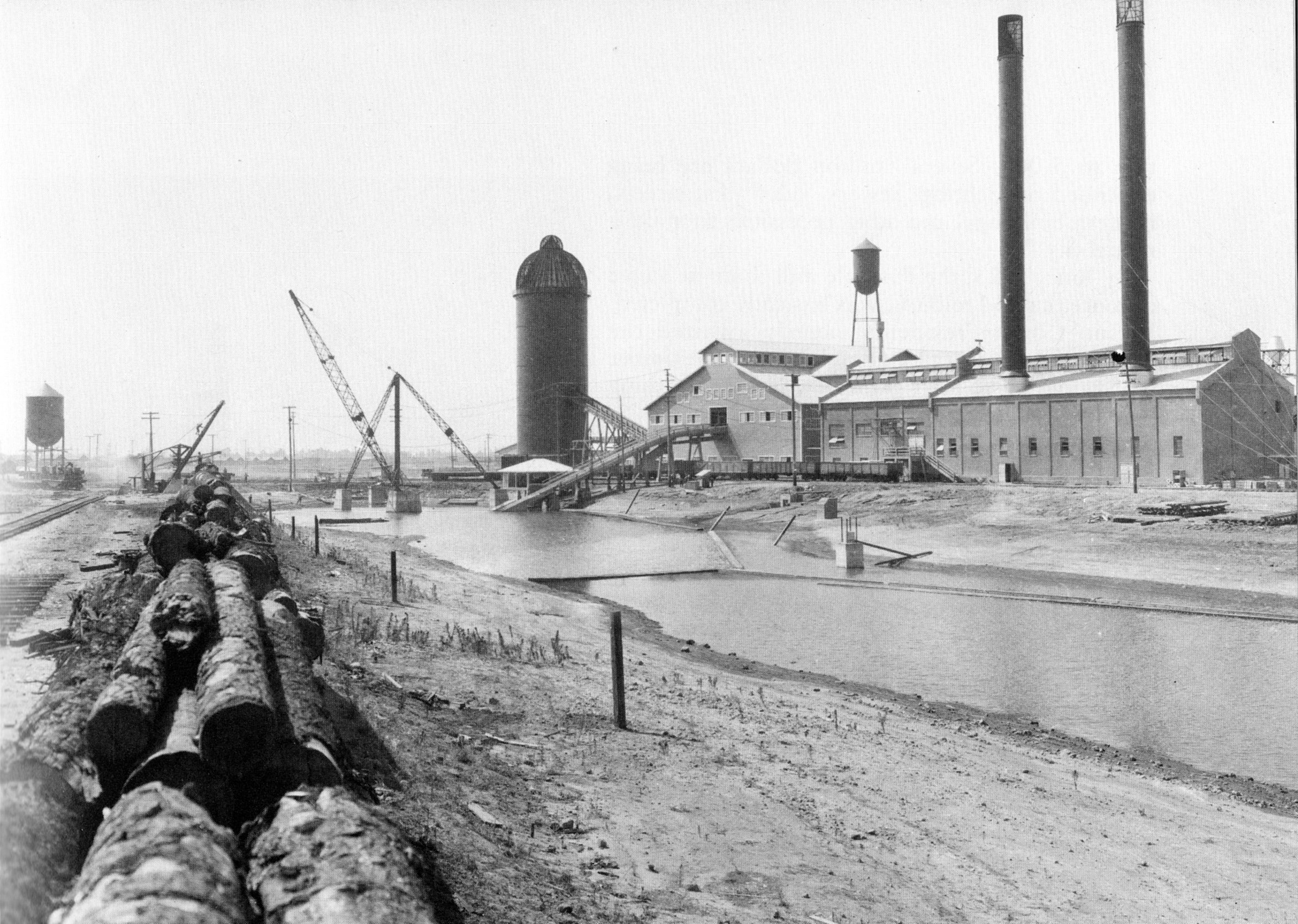
Log Pond.

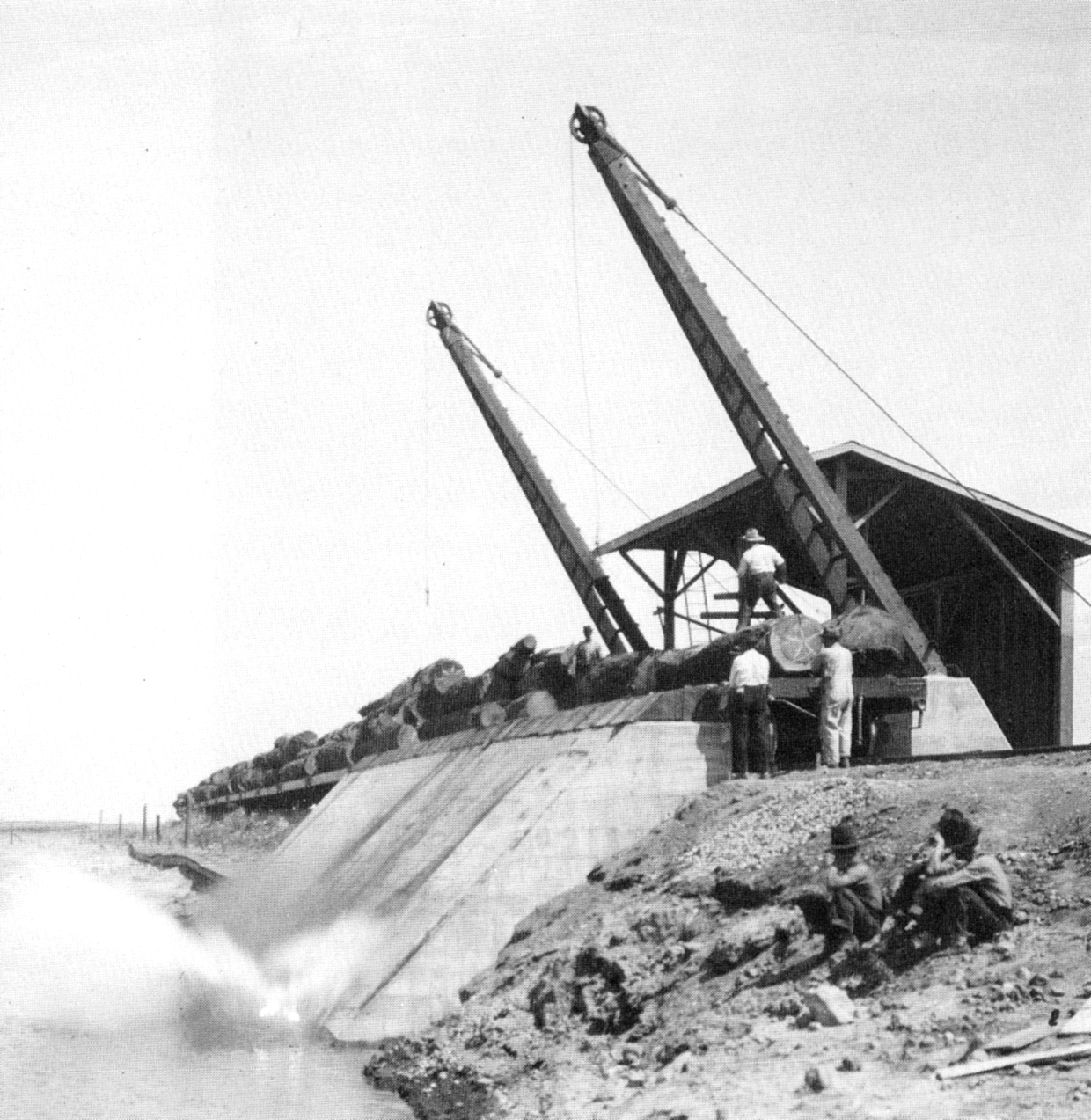
Unloading dock

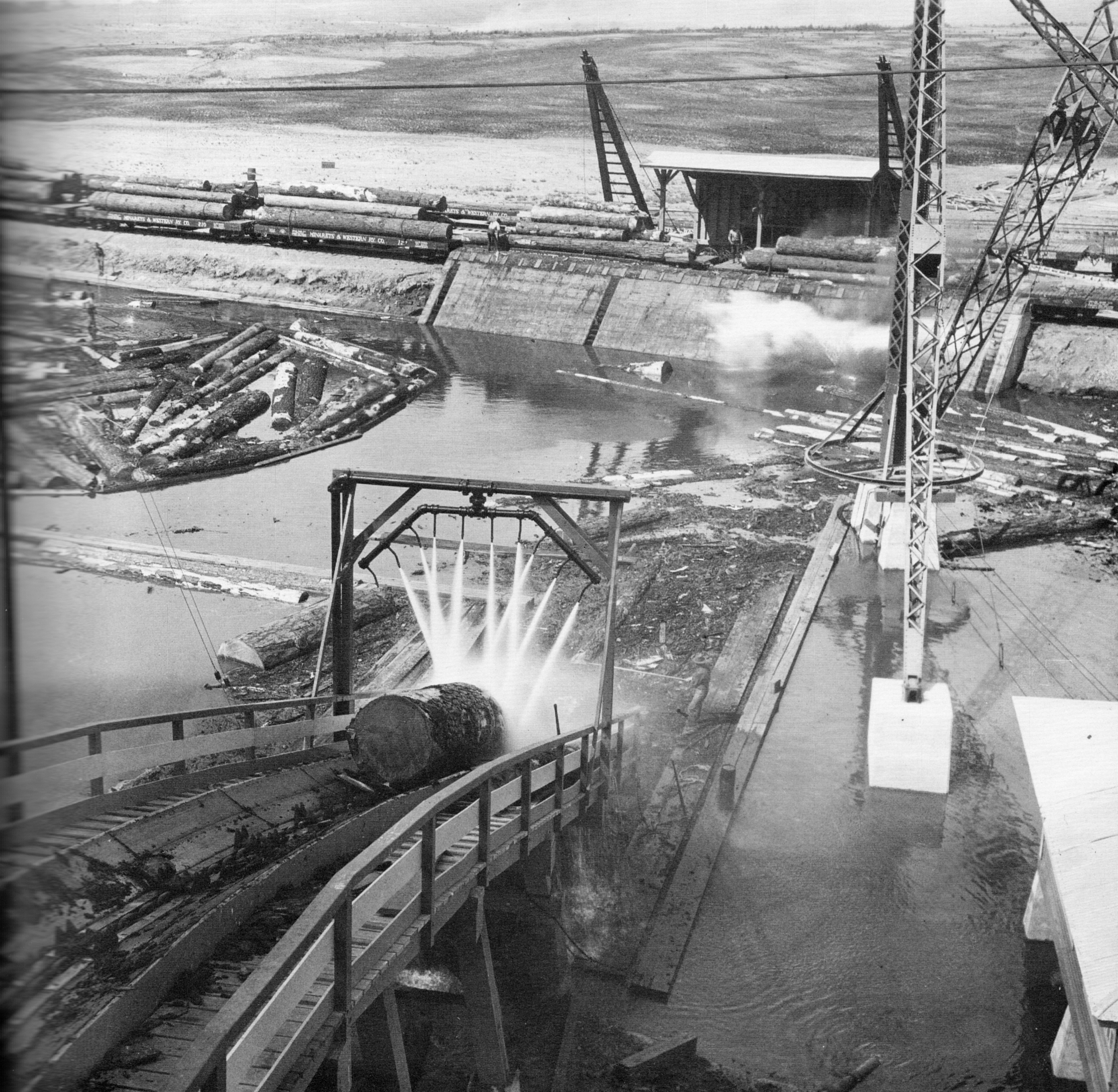
Log wash.

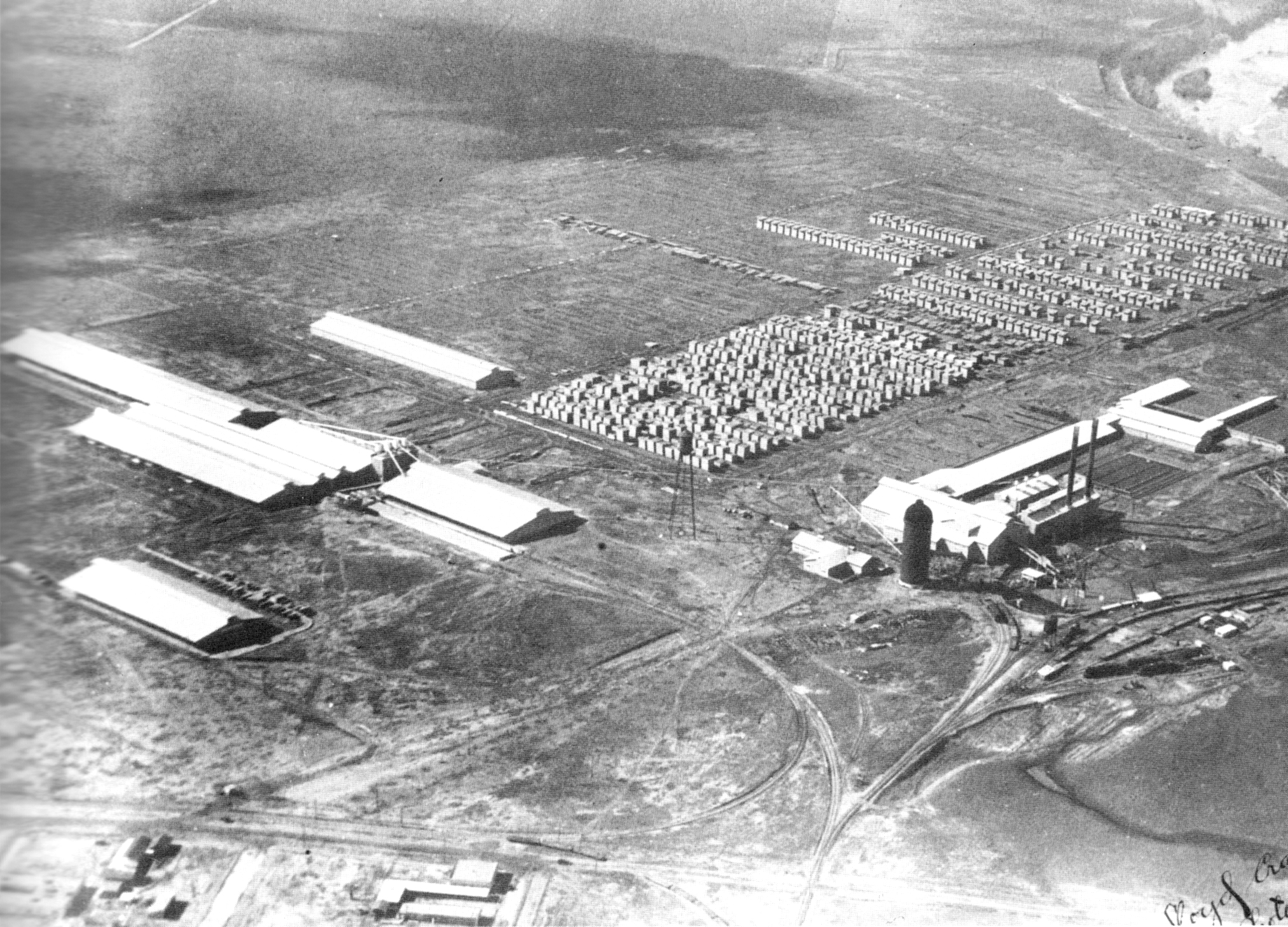
Drying yards.

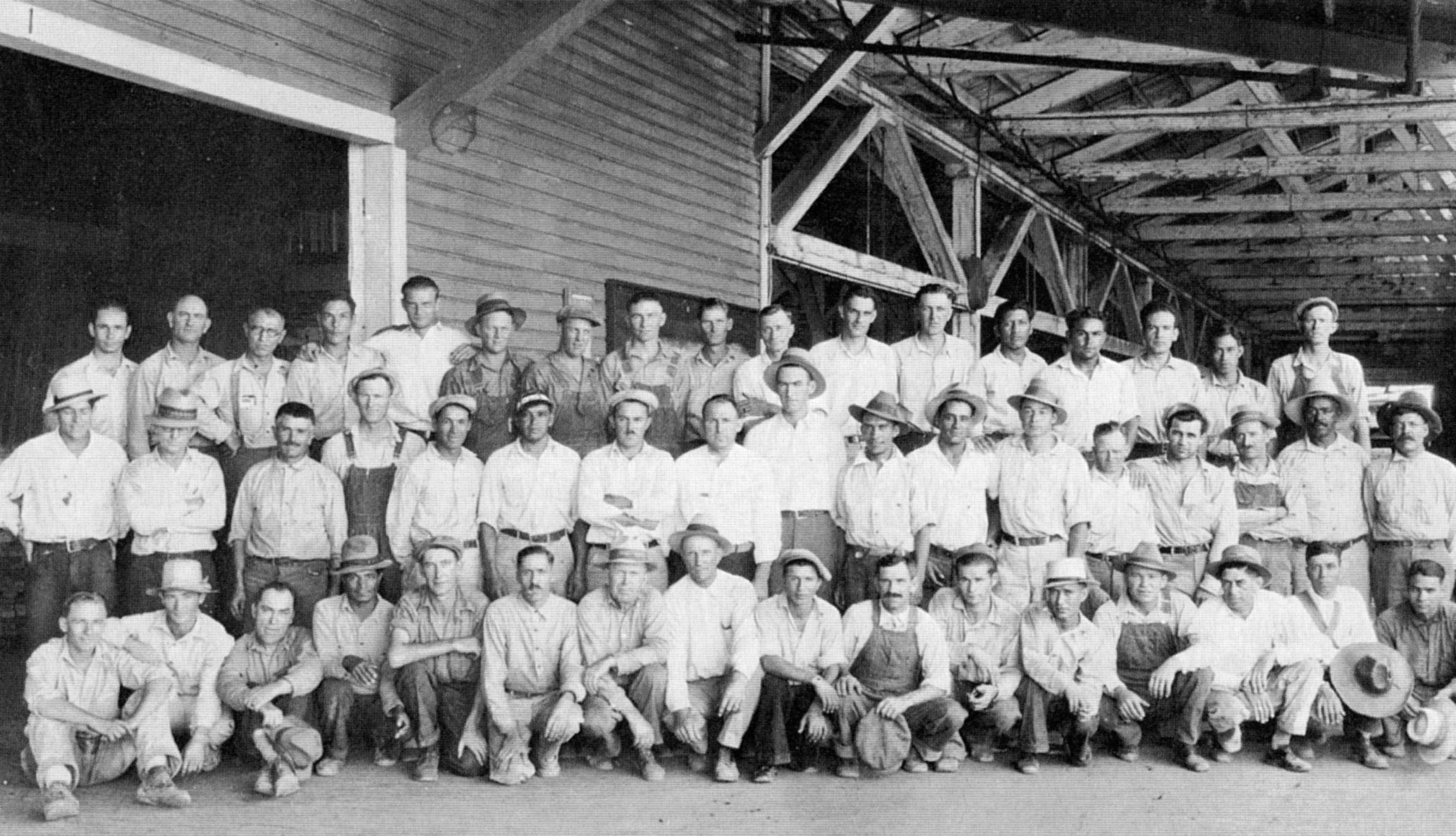
Box factory and planing mill gangs.

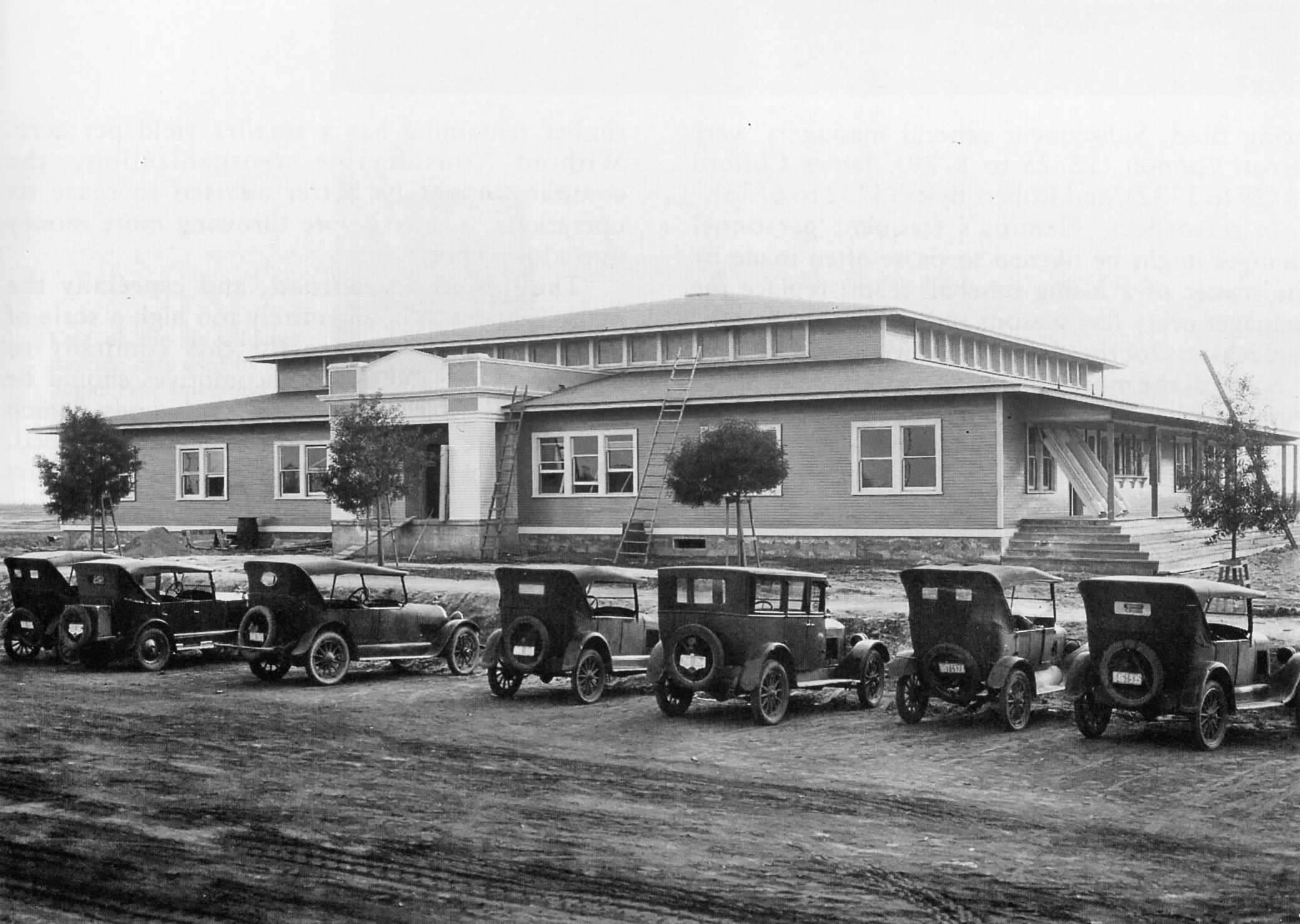
Company Headquarters

== Tourism and film ==
Challenged by a dwindling lumber supply and collapse of the lumber market, the Sugar Pine Company sought alternative sources of revenue. Tourist excursions began in 1930. The trips included passage from Fresno to Central Camp by train on specially outfitted flatcars. A complete program included boxing and wrestling bouts, lumberjack exhibitions, dancing to a pops orchestra, and overnight accommodations in the lumberjack dormitories.

In 1931, RKO Pictures rented the mountain facility as the setting for Carnival Boat starring William Boyd and Ginger Rogers. The film was praised for its "realistic depiction of life in the lumber camps."

== Bankruptcy and liquidation ==
Despite its record-setting lumber production the company lost money from the start. What's more, the company was seriously undercapitalized. Eighty percent of its operating capital was borrowed. This led the company to quickly exhaust its timber tracts to help service its debts. By 1930, much of their timber was used up. Despite their petition to open timber tracts east of Chiquito Ridge, the government wouldn't sell more trees to the company.

Excessive operating costs, the after-effects of the 1929 stock market crash, and collapse of the lumber market in 1931 were too much. After a failed bid to merge with Yosemite Lumber Company, the Sugar Pine Company went into bankruptcy on June 13, 1933.

Following the bankruptcy of Sugar Pine Lumber, operations on the Minarets and Western railway were suspended by the railroad commission in September 1933. While technically a common carrier, over ninety-five percent of the freight carried by the railroad was for the logging company.

== Legacy ==
Today, only a few traces of Sugar Pine Lumber remain in the mountains. The rails were scrapped soon after bankruptcy. The locomotives were sold. Many of the large buildings at Central Camp were dismantled for their lumber. The remaining parcels were sold to private homeowners. The rest has reverted to the Sierra National Forest. The steep railroad right-of-way is now United States Forest Service Road 6S42, also known as Central Camp Road. Whiskers and Gaggs Camp, two of the former SPL logging camp sites on the route, are public campgrounds. Dozens of miles of former logging spurs and access roads have been merged into the National Forest Transportation System (NFTS). The area is a popular destination for off-road vehicles and mountain biking.

== Locomotive roster ==
Name	Builder	Type	Date	Shop number	Weight	Fuel Capacity	Water Capacity	Notes
1	ALCO	2-8-2T	February 16, 1923	64147	190,000 lb (86,000 kg)	1,000 US gal (3,800 L)	2,500 US gal (9,500 L)	Purchased new. Sold to Pensacola Company in November 1935. Later sold to Willamette Valley Lumber Company. Scrapped 1955.
2	ALCO	2-8-2T	February 16, 1923	64148	190,000 lb (86,000 kg)	1,000 US gal (3,800 L)	2,500 US gal (9,500 L)	Purchased new. Sold to Pensacola Company in November 1935. Sold to Clark & Wilson Lumber Company, No. 16; used on Portland & Southwestern Railway. Scrapped 1955.
3	ALCO	2-8-2T	February 14, 1924	65378	188,500 lb (85,500 kg)	1,000 US gal (3,800 L)	2,500 US gal (9,500 L)	Purchased new. Sold to Pensacola Company in November 1935. Later, sold to Flora Logging Company, No. 3, 1936; sold to Consolidated Timber Company, 2nd No. 2, 1939; sold Kern & Kibbe Contracting Company No. 2.; 1945; sold to the Medford Corporation, No. 6, rebuilt to 2-8-2; scrapped June 1952.
4	ALCO	2-8-2T	March 1, 1925	66033	197,500 lb (89,600 kg)	1,000 US gal (3,800 L)	3,000 US gal (11,000 L)	Purchased new. Sold to Pensacola Company in November 1935; sold to Pacific Lumber Company, No. 37; sold to railfan Frank Bayliss, No. 37; sold Wawa & Concordville Inc., No. 37, 1966; sold Wilmington & Western Railroad, No 37. Sold to Timber Heritage Association November 2003; awaiting restoration at Strasburg Rail Road.
5	ALCO	2-10-2T	July 1, 1927	67371	267,500 lb (121,300 kg)	2,000 US gal (7,600 L)	4,000 US gal (15,000 L)	Purchased new. Sold to Pensacola Company in November 1935; sold to Pacific Lumber Company, No. 37; sold to Mason-Walsh-Atkinson-Kier Company as No. 800; sold H.J. Kaiser Company as No. 1999; scrapped 1947.
10	Lima	2T Shay	March 1926	3301	152,300 lb (69,100 kg)	1,200 US gal (4,500 L)	3,000 US gal (11,000 L)	Purchased new. Sold to Pensacola Company in November 1935; sold to Pacific Lumber Company. Scrapped after 1946.

Locomotives of the Sugar Pine Lumber Company

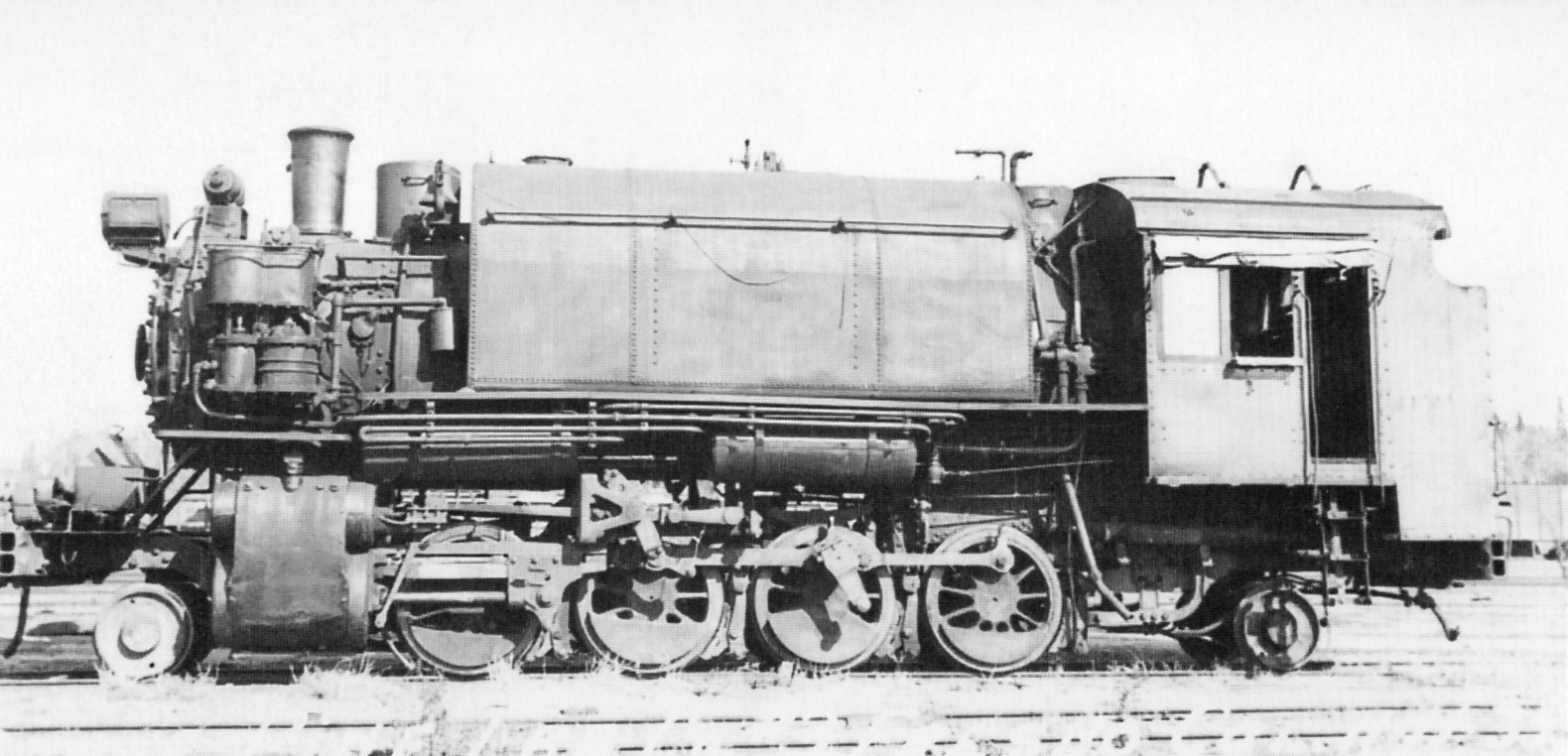
SPL No. 1 in Fresno

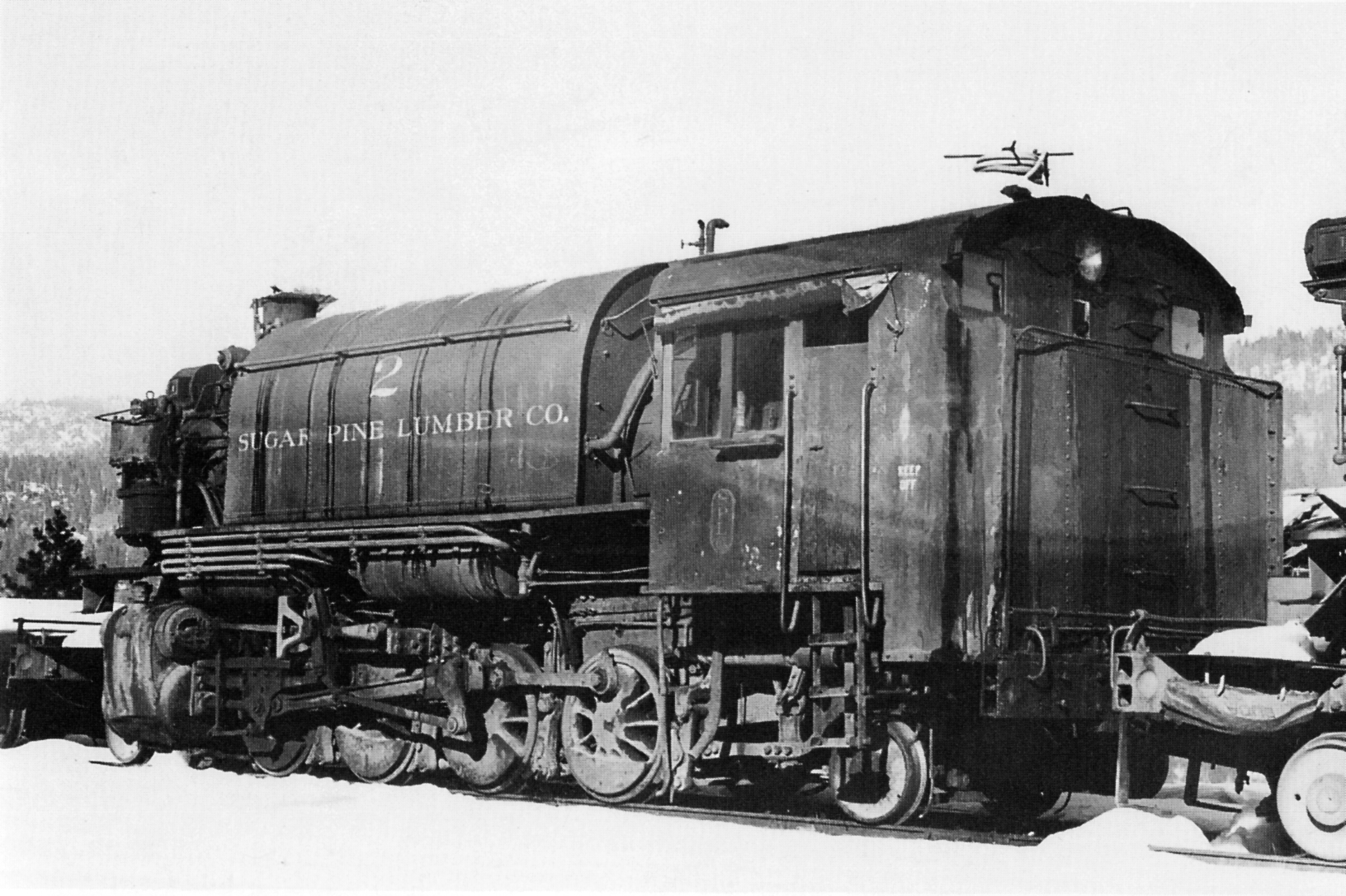
SPL No. 2 at Bass Lake

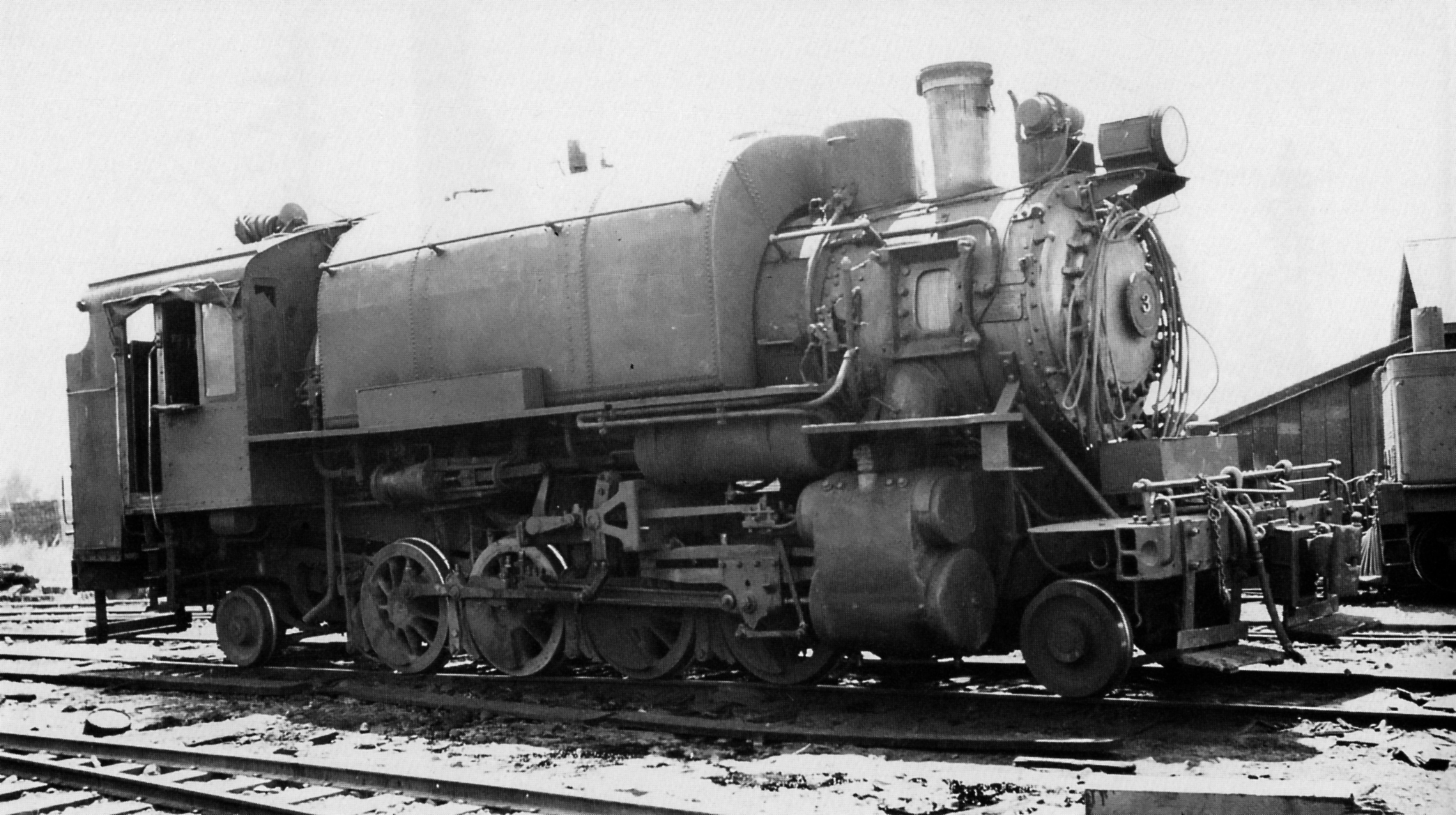
SPL No. 3

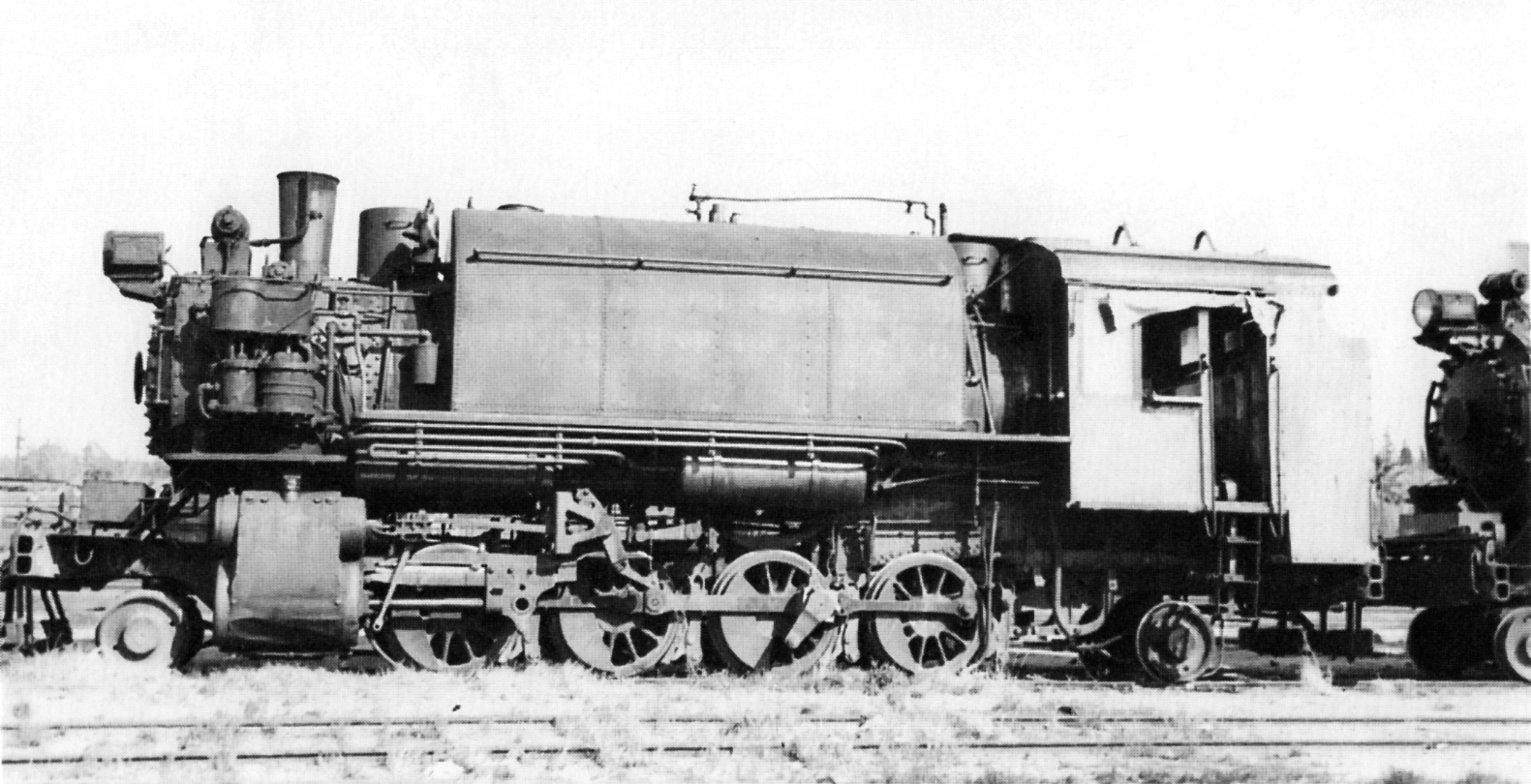
SPL No. 4

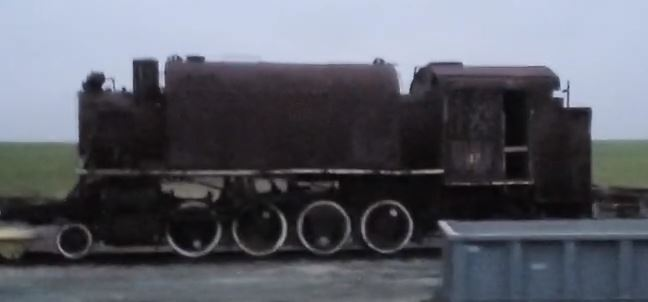
SPL No.4 in open air storage awaiting restoration 2021.

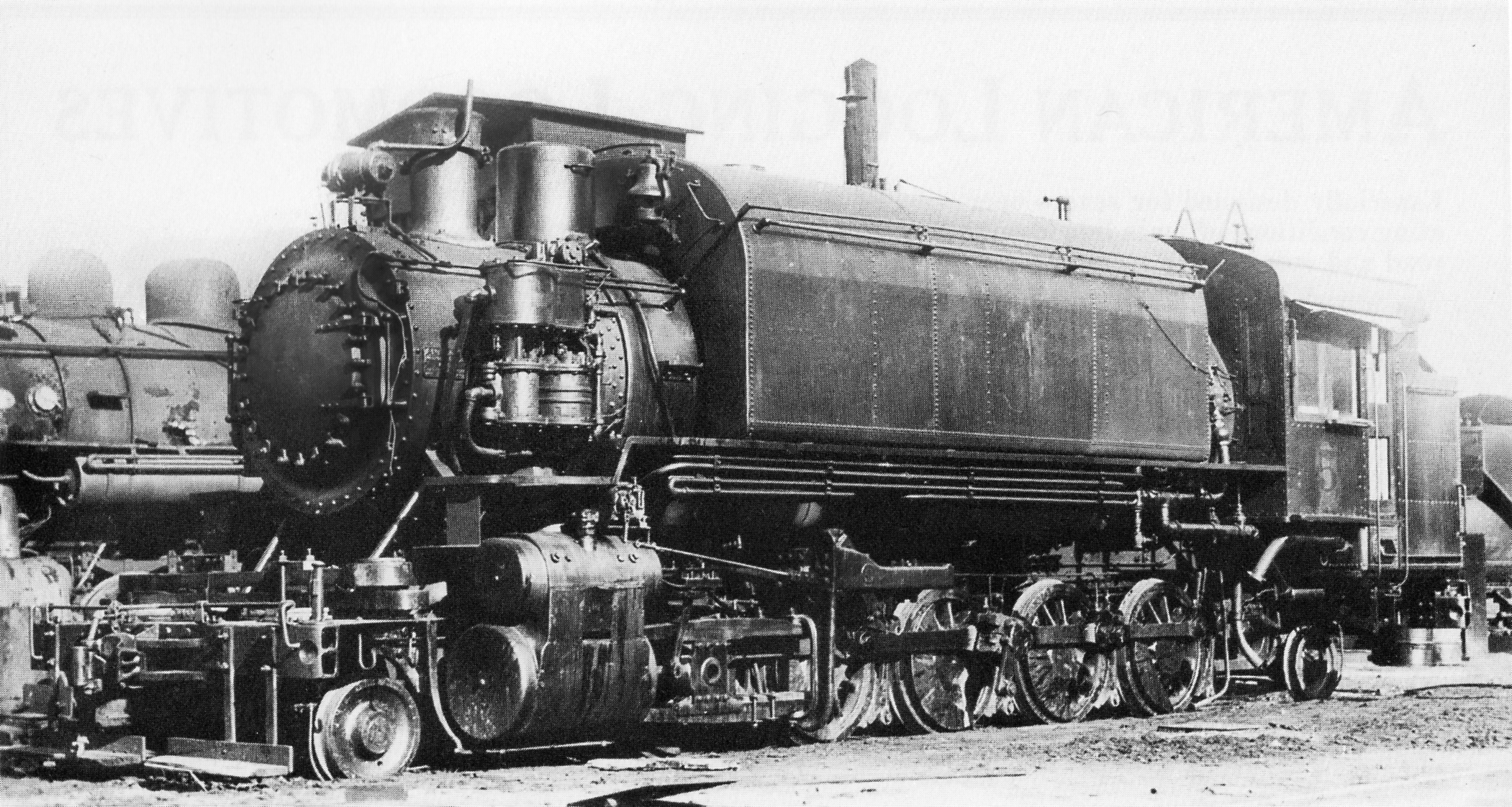
SPL No. 5

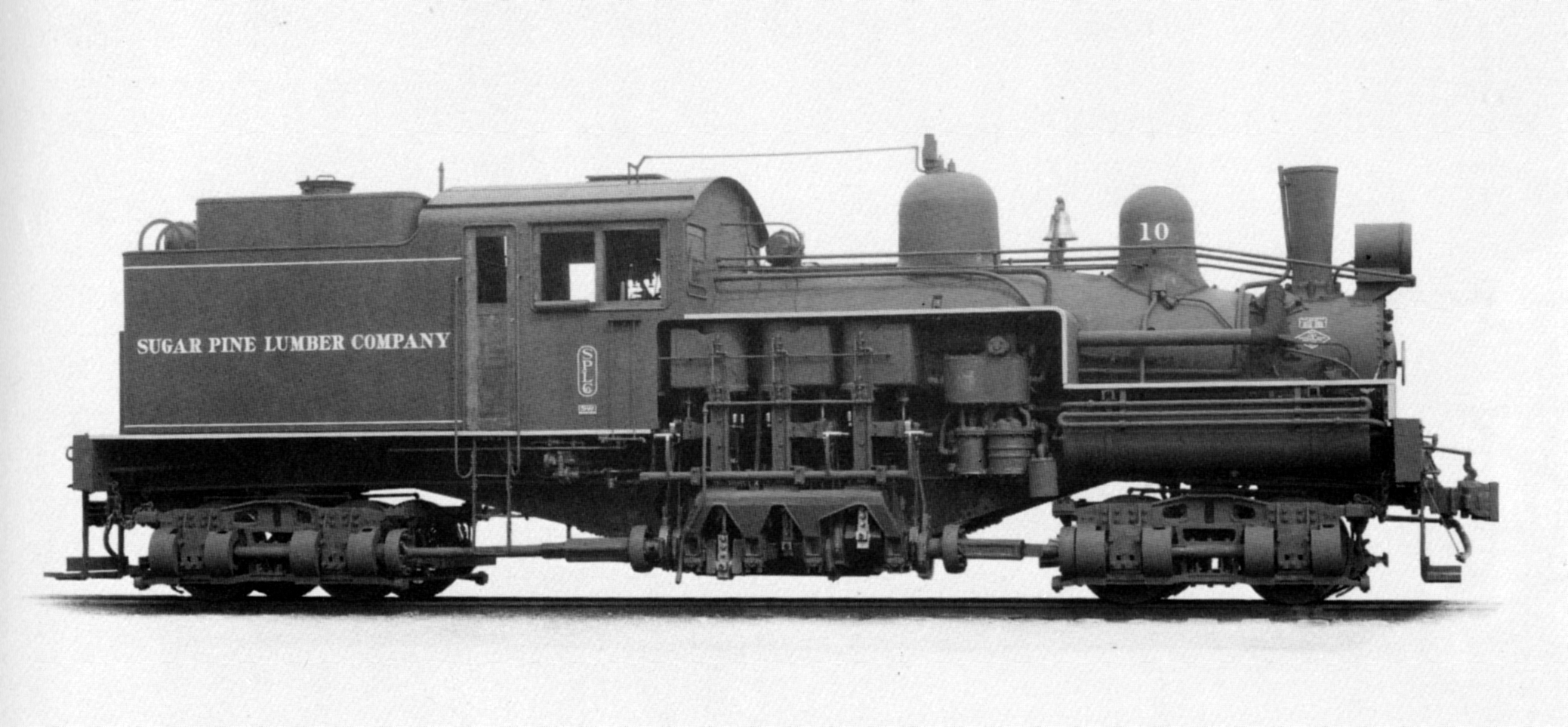
SPL No. 10
