= List of museums in California =

This list of museums in California is a list of museums, defined for this context as institutions (including nonprofit organizations, government entities, and private businesses) that collect and care for objects of cultural, artistic, scientific, or historical interest and make their collections or related exhibits available for public viewing. Also included are non-profit and university art galleries. Museums that exist only in cyberspace (i.e., virtual museums) are not included.

To use the sortable tables: click on the icons at the top of each column to sort that column in alphabetical order; click again for reverse alphabetical order.

== Central Coast and Monterey Bay Area ==
Includes Monterey, San Benito, San Luis Obispo, Santa Barbara, Santa Cruz and Ventura counties

== Inland Empire ==
Riverside County and San Bernardino County (includes the Coachella Valley)

== North Coast ==
Includes Del Norte, Humboldt, Lake, and Mendocino counties

== San Francisco Bay Area ==
Includes Alameda, Contra Costa, Marin, Napa, San Francisco, San Mateo, Santa Clara, Solano, and Sonoma counties

== San Joaquin Valley ==
Includes Fresno, Kern, Kings, Madera, Merced, Joaquin, Stanislaus and Tulare counties

== Shasta Cascade ==
Includes Butte, Lassen, Modoc, Plumas, Shasta, Siskiyou, Tehama and Trinity counties

== Elsewhere ==
The museums below are found in the following counties, which may be split over different regions:

- Gold Country – includes Amador, Calaveras, El Dorado, Mariposa, Nevada, Placer, Sierra and Tuolumne counties.
- High Sierra – includes Amador, El Dorado, Inyo, Mariposa, Mono and Placer counties
- Imperial Valley – Imperial County
- Napa Valley – Napa County
- Sacramento Valley – includes Colusa, Placer, Sacramento, Sutter, Yolo and Yuba counties

Name	Town/City	County	Region	Type	Summary
Aerospace Museum of California	North Highlands	Sacramento	Sacramento Valley	Aviation	Located on the grounds of the former McClellan Air Force Base, displays of military and civilian aircraft as well as space vehicle replicas
Alpine County Museum	Markleeville	Alpine	High Sierra	Open air	website, complex includes the main museum building with local history exhibits, Old Webster Schoolhouse, Markleeville Log Jail, carriage shed, and historic silver ore stamp mill
Amador County Museum	Jackson	Amador	Gold Country	Local history	Operated by the Amador County Historical Society, mid 19th-century home with local history displays including gold mining, clothing, period rooms, Native American and Chinese American collections, Kennedy and North Star Mines models
Amador Whitney Museum	Amador City	Amador	Gold Country	Local history	website
Angels Camp Museum	Angels Camp	Calaveras	Gold Country	Local history	Includes carriages, mining equipment, minerals, household items
Bale Grist Mill State Historic Park	St. Helena	Napa	Napa Valley	Mill	The historic mill is open on weekends
Bernhard Museum Complex	Auburn	Placer	Gold Country	Historic house	Includes the Victorian Bernhard residence with period rooms, wine storage building and wine processing building with wine-making exhibits, and a barn with horse-drawn vehicles and blacksmith area
Blue Line Arts	Roseville	Placer	Sacramento Valley	Art	website, art center with galleries, works of regional and national artists
Bodie State Historic Park	Bodie	Mono	High Sierra	Open air	Ghost town mining camp
Bohart Museum of Entomology	Davis	Yolo	Sacramento Valley	Natural history	Live and mounted insect displays, also a research museum of the University of California, Davis
Borax Museum	Furnace Creek	Inyo	High Sierra	Mining	Located at the Oasis at Death Valley, borax mining tools and equipment, minerals, models of Twenty-mule team wagon trains
Calaveras County Museum	San Andreas	Calaveras	Gold Country	Local history	Operated by the Calaveras County Historical Society, located in the former Calaveras County Courthouse, Jail Yard, and Hall of Records
California Automobile Museum	Sacramento	Sacramento	Sacramento Valley	Automobile	Formerly the Towe Auto Museum, over 170 classic cars, race cars, muscle cars, hot rods, early models and automotive memorabilia
California Museum	Sacramento	Sacramento	Sacramento Valley	History	Formerly known as the Golden State Museum, includes the California Hall of Fame, exhibits on important people and aspects of California including California Indians, missions, women, California Constitution, health
California State Capitol Museum	Sacramento	Sacramento	Sacramento Valley	Capitol	Museum in the Capitol, tours, history of the state government
California State Indian Museum	Sacramento	Sacramento	Sacramento Valley	Native American	Themes of nature, spirit and family
California State Mining and Mineral Museum	Mariposa	Mariposa	Gold Country	Mining	Located at the Mariposa County Fairgrounds, gold mining
California State Railroad Museum	Sacramento	Sacramento	Sacramento Valley	Railroad	Features 21 restored locomotives and railroad cars, exhibits, summer heritage railroad rides on the Sacramento Southern Railroad
Effie Yeaw Nature Center (Carmichael, California)	Sacramento	Sacramento	Sacramento Valley	Local history	, operated by American River Natural History Association, located in Ancil C. Hoffman Park
Carnegie Museum (Roseville, California)	Roseville	Placer	Sacramento Valley	Local history	website, operated by the Roseville Historical Society, located in a Carnegie library building
Carolyn Parr Nature Center	Napa	Napa	Napa Valley	Natural history	website, located in Westwood Hills Park, features natural history museum
Center for Contemporary Art, Sacramento	Sacramento	Sacramento	Sacramento Valley	Art	website
C Gibson Museum & Cultural Center	Middletown	Lake	Lake County	Local History	Geology, native American, mining, and pioneer history.
Chew Kee Store Museum	Fiddletown	Amador	Gold Country	History	1855 Chinese herb shop, operated by the Fiddletown Preservation Society
Chinese American Museum of Northern California	Marysville	Yuba	Sacramento Valley	Ethnic – Chinese	website, Chinese participation in the gold rush
Chinese Association Museum	Locke	Sacramento	Sacramento Valley	Ethnic – Chinese	History of the Chinese in Locke, culture
C.N. Gorman Museum	Davis	Yolo	Sacramento Valley	Art	website, contemporary Native American and indigenous art, part of the University of California, Davis, also known as Carl M. Gorman Museum
Columbia State Historic Park	Columbia	Tuolumne	Gold Country	Living	California Gold Rush town with living history demonstrations
Community Memorial Museum of Sutter County	Yuba City	Sutter	Sacramento Valley	Local history	
Couture Pattern Museum	Santa Barbara	Santa Barbara	Santa Barbara	Fashion History & Couture Sewing	Single-room venue, with rotating exhibits
Crocker Art Museum	Sacramento	Sacramento	Sacramento Valley	Art	Early California art, Old Master drawings, Asian art, international ceramics
Dai Loy Museum	Locke	Sacramento	Sacramento Valley	History	Former Chinese gambling house
di Rosa	Napa	Napa	Napa Valley	Art	website, art galleries and outdoor sculpture on a nature preserve
Discovery Museum Science & Space Center	Sacramento	Sacramento	Sacramento Valley	Science	website, themes include space, solar system, nature, building new facility to be known as the Powerhouse Science Center
Don & June Salvatori California Pharmacy Museum	Sacramento	Sacramento	Sacramento Valley	Medical	Pharmacy artifacts, located at the California Pharmacists Association headquarters
Donner Memorial State Park	Truckee	Nevada	Gold Country	History	Includes the Emigrant Trail Museum with exhibits on local Native Americans, the Donner Party and builders of the transcontinental railroad
Downieville Museum	Downieville	Sierra	Gold Country	Local history	
Eastern California Museum	Independence	Inyo	High Sierra	Local history	website, includes Native American baskets and artifacts, fossils and exhibits of local history, artifacts from the Manzanar World War II Internment Center
El Dorado County Historical Museum	Placerville	El Dorado	Gold Country	Local history	website, Native American baskets, gold mining equipment, farm tools, household items
Elmshaven	St. Helena	Napa	Napa Valley	Religious	Home of Ellen G. White whose ministry was instrumental in founding the seventh-day Sabbatarian Adventist movement
Empire Mine State Historic Park	Grass Valley	Nevada	Gold Country	Mining	Attractions include a mining museum, an Edwardian estate house, and a mine with living history demonstrations
Explorit	Davis	Yolo	Sacramento Valley	Science	website, regional hands-on science center
Folsom History Museum	Folsom	Sacramento	Sacramento Valley	Local history	website, operated by the Folsom Historical Society, exhibits about Folsom's native people, the discovery of gold and the formation of mining camps, ethnic groups who contributed to this area, the formation of the town, railroad, prison, powerhouse, and later efforts at gold mining
Folsom Powerhouse State Historic Park	Folsom	Sacramento	Sacramento Valley	Technology	Historic 1890s hydroelectric power plant
Folsom Prison Museum	Folsom	Sacramento	Sacramento Valley	Law enforcement	website, history of Folsom Prison
Folsom Railroad Museum	Folsom	Sacramento	Sacramento Valley	Railroad	website, operated by the Folsom, El Dorado & Sacramento Historical Railroad Association
Forest Hill Divide Museum	Foresthill	Placer	Gold Country	Mining	website, includes mining museum, a reconstructed livery stable/blacksmith shop, and the original Foresthill Jail
Fountain & Tallman Museum	Placerville	El Dorado	Gold Country	Local history	Operated by the El Dorado County Historical Society
Gatekeeper’s Museum	Tahoe City	Placer	High Sierra	Local history	website, operated by the North Lake Tahoe Historical Society, includes Marion Steinbach Indian Basket Museum
Gold Bug Park & Mine	Placerville	El Dorado	Gold Country	Mining	website, includes Hattie's Museum with mining exhibits, Gold Bug Mine to tour, Meagher House for natural history education, Hendy Stamp Mill
Gold Country Museum	Auburn	Placer	Gold Country	Mining	Area gold mining and local history
Golden Drift Museum	Dutch Flat	Placer	Gold Country	Local history	website, influence of hydraulic mining, lumber and railroads in the area
Governor's Mansion State Historic Park	Sacramento	Sacramento	Sacramento Valley	Historic house	Former mansion of the governors of California
Grass Valley Museum	Grass Valley	Nevada	Gold Country	Local history	Includes furniture, art, objects d’art, clothing, musical instruments and artifacts of the Victorian era
Grass Valley Video History Museum	Grass Valley	Nevada	Gold Country	Local history	Historical film footage locally and from around the world
Griffith Quarry Museum	Penryn	Placer	Gold Country	Industry	Local granite industry
Groveland Yosemite Gateway Museum	Groveland	Tuolumne	Gold Country	Local history	website, operated by the Southern Tuolumne County Historical Society
Hattie Weber Museum	Davis	Yolo	Sacramento Valley	Local history	website, operated by the Yolo County Historical Society, includes dolls from many countries and eras, textiles, books
Hayden Cabin	Mammoth Lakes	Mono	High Sierra	Historic house	website, operated by the Southern Mono Historical Society, also known as Mammoth Museum, four-room log cabin with original 1930s furnishings
Heidrick Ag History Center	Woodland	Yolo	Sacramento Valley	Agriculture	website, antique agricultural equipment
Hellman-Ehrman Mansion	Tahoma	El Dorado	Gold Country	Historic house	website, located in Ed Z'berg Sugar Pine Point State Park, early 20th-century summer lodge house
Historic Firehouse No. 1 Museum	Nevada City	Nevada	Gold Country	Local history	Operated by the Nevada County Historical Society
Historic Courthouse Museum	Lakeport	Lake	Lake County	Local History	Old county courthouse, Native American and pioneer history
Historic Schoolhouse Museum	Lower Lake	Lake	Lake County	Local History	Old schoolhouse, Native American and pioneer history
Home of Lola Montez	Grass Valley	Nevada	Gold Country	Local history	Houses the town's chamber of commerce, visitor center and local history museum
Honeybee Discovery Center	Orland	Glenn		Zoology	
Imperial Valley College Art Gallery	Imperial	Imperial	Imperial Valley	Art	Juanita Salazar Lowe Gallery
Imperial Valley Desert Museum	Ocotillo	Imperial	Imperial Valley	Multiple	website, Native American, archaeological and historic artifacts
Inyo Council for the Arts Gallery	Bishop	Inyo	High Sierra	Art	Changing exhibits of area art
Indian Grinding Rock State Historic Park	Pine Grove	Amador	High Sierra	Native American	Includes Chaw'se Regional Indian Museum
James Calvin Sly Museum	Pollock Pines	El Dorado	Gold Country	Local history	Located in Sly Park Recreation Area, named for James Calvin Sly
Kennedy Mine	Jackson	Amador	High Sierra	Mining	Gold mine structures
Kentucky Mine Museum	Sierra City	Sierra	Gold Country	Mining	website, operated by the Sierra County Historical Society, working gold mine with operating stamp mill
KidZone Museum	Truckee	Nevada	Gold Country	Children's	website, formerly the Sierra Nevada Children's Museum
Lake Tahoe Historical Society Museum	South Lake Tahoe	El Dorado	High Sierra	Local history	website
Laws Railroad Museum and Historic Site	Bishop	Inyo	High Sierra	Open air	Operated by the Bishop Museum & Historical Society, collection of 19th century buildings with historical exhibits, railroad cars and equipment
Leland Stanford Mansion State Historic Park	Sacramento	Sacramento	Sacramento Valley	Historic house	Victorian mansion restored to 1872 appearance
Locke Boarding House and Visitor Center	Locke	Sacramento	Sacramento Valley	Local history	Offers tours of the historic community
Locke Chinese School	Locke	Sacramento	Sacramento Valley	School	Former Chinese school
Lone Pine Film History Museum	Lone Pine	Inyo	High Sierra	Media	website, movie history of Lone Pine, Death Valley and the Eastern Sierra areas; officially known as the Beverly and Jim Rogers Museum of Lone Pine Film History
Maidu Museum & Historic Site	Roseville	Placer	Sacramento Valley	Multiple	Natural and cultural history, including exhibits on Native Californians and the interdependence of nature and culture
Malakoff Diggins State Historic Park	Nevada City	Nevada	Gold Country	Mining	Includes mining museum and deserted mining town
Mammoth Ski Museum	Mammoth Lakes	Mono	High Sierra	Sports	Art, culture and artifacts related to skiing
Manzanar National Historic Site	Independence	Inyo	High Sierra	History	Site of one of ten camps where over 110,000 Japanese Americans were imprisoned during World War II
Mariposa Museum & History Center	Mariposa	Mariposa	Gold Country	Local history	website, cultural history of Mariposa County, including Miwok display, gold mining equipment, miner's cabin, saloon, one-room school
Marshall Gold Discovery State Historic Park	Coloma	El Dorado	Gold Country	Open air	Includes Gold Discovery Museum and Visitor Center, 20 historic buildings including mining, house, school, and store exhibits
Mary Aaron Museum	Marysville	Yuba	Sacramento Valley	Historic house	Victorian-era house, exhibits of local history
Mendenhall's Museum of Gasoline Pumps & Petroliana	Buelton	Santa Barbara	Central Coast	Automotive	https://www.mendenhallmuseum.com/ Private collection of vintage gas, racing & roadway artifacts
Milton Gottardi Loyalton Museum	Loyalton	Sierra	Gold Country	Local history	Includes displays on logging, agriculture, Washoe Indians, fraternal organizations
Mono Basin History Museum	Lee Vining	Mono	High Sierra	Local history	website, operated by the Mono County Historical Society, located in a historic schoolhouse, Native American artifacts, gold mining implements, local history and culture, Nellie Bly's legendary Upside-Down House, farming and mining equipment
Mono Basin National Forest Scenic Area Visitor Center	Lee Vining	Mono	High Sierra	Natural history	Geology and wildlife of Mono Lake
Mono County Museum	Bridgeport	Mono	High Sierra	Local history	Operated by the Mono County Historical Society
Monteverde Store Museum	Sutter Creek	Amador	Gold Country	History	Historic country store with historic items, open by appointment
Murphys Old Timers Museum	Murphys	Calaveras	Gold Country	Local history	website
Museum of History in Granite	Felicity	Imperial	Imperial Valley	History	website, outdoor granite panels depicting humanity's history
Museum of Medical History	Sacramento	Sacramento	Sacramento Valley	Medical	website, collections in the fields of surgery, clinical diagnosis, infectious disease, pharmacy, radiology, Chinese medicine, obstetrics and gynecology, medical quackery, operated by the Sierra Sacramento Valley Medical Society
Museum of Sierra Ski History and 1960 Winter Olympics	Tahoe City	Placer	High Sierra	Sports	Area ski history from its beginnings through the 1960 Winter Olympics
Museum of the Forgotten Warriors	Marysville	Yuba	Sacramento Valley	Military	website, uniforms, helicopters, photographs, medals, military memorabilia
Napa County Historical Society	Napa	Napa	Napa Valley	Local history	Located in the Goodman Library; Jess Doud Memorial Room hosts several exhibitions each year
Napa Firefighters Museum	Napa	Napa	Napa Valley	Firefighting	website
Napa Valley Museum	Yountville	Napa	Napa Valley	Multiple	website, art, history, natural history of Napa Valley, including local Native American and wine-making history
Nevada County Narrow Gauge Railroad Museum	Nevada City	Nevada	Gold Country	Railroad	Operated by the Nevada County Historical Society
New Melones Visitor Center and Museum	Sonora	Calaveras	Gold Country	Local history	Historic, natural and cultural history of the area around New Melones Lake
North Star Mine and Powerhouse & Pelton Wheel Museum	Grass Valley	Nevada	Gold Country	Mining	Hundreds of mining artifacts and machinery, operated by the Nevada County Historical Society; also called the Grass Valley Mining Museum or the Northstar Mining Museum
Northern Mariposa County History Center	Coulterville	Mariposa	Gold Country	Local history	website, pioneers, mining, Chinese immigrants, John Muir
Old Jail Museum (Truckee, California)	Truckee	Nevada	Gold Country	Prison	website, operated by the Truckee – Donner Historical Society, 19th-century jail with exhibits of local history
Old Sacramento State Historic Park	Sacramento	Sacramento	Sacramento Valley	Multiple	Includes Old Sacramento Interpretive Center, Wells Fargo History Museum, Sacramento History Museum, Old Sacramento Schoolhouse Museum, several historic buildings and more
Old Sacramento Schoolhouse Museum	Sacramento	Sacramento	Sacramento Valley	School	website, late 19th-century period one room schoolhouse
Owens Valley Paiute Shoshone Cultural Center-Museum	Bishop	Inyo	High Sierra	Native American	Artifacts and antiquities from the Numa (Paiute) and Newe (Shoshone) Nations
Pioneers' Park Museum	Imperial	Imperial	Imperial Valley	Local history	website, operated by the Imperial County Historical Society, exhibits include county history, ethnic groups, agriculture, cattle, military, culture
Pioneer Yosemite History Center	Wawona	Mariposa	High Sierra	Open air	Historic structures from different eras of Yosemite’s history
Placer County Museum	Auburn	Placer	Gold Country	Local history	website, includes courthouse and sheriff's exhibits, Native America art, gold country exhibits
Portuguese Historical Museum	San Jose	Santa Clara	Santa Clara Valley	Portuguese heritage	website, includes exhibits on the history of the Portuguese diaspora in California
Preston School of Industry (a.k.a. Preston Castle)	Ione	Amador	High Sierra	Prison	Tours of the former reform school
Rae House Museum	Galt	Sacramento	Sacramento Valley	Historic house	19th-century house with period displays, dolls, local history exhibits, operated by the Galt Area Historical Society, open by appointment
Railtown 1897 State Historic Park	Jamestown	Tuolumne	Gold Country	Railroad	Seasonal steam and diesel-powered train rides, 1920s locomotive roundhouse, machine shop and related exhibits
Red Barn Museum	San Andreas	Calaveras	Gold Country	Local history	website, operated by the Calaveras County Historical Society, features agriculture, mining, logging, and ranching artifacts, tools and equipment
Reiff's Antique Gas Station Automotive Museum	Woodland	Yolo	Sacramento Valley	Transportation	1950s cars, automobile memorabilia, antiques and car culture
Richard Nelson Gallery	Davis	Yolo	Sacramento Valley	Art	website, part of the University of California, Davis
Robert Louis Stevenson Museum	St. Helena	Napa	Napa Valley	Biographical	website, devoted to author Robert Louis Stevenson
Rocklin History Museum	Rocklin	Placer	Gold Country	Local history	website, operated by the Rocklin Historical Society, mining, railroads, ranching
Roseville Telephone Museum	Roseville	Placer	Sacramento Valley	Technology	website, antique telephones and memorabilia, open by appointment
Roseville Utility Exploration Center	Roseville	Placer	Sacramento Valley	Science	website, environmental learning center including energy efficiency, renewable technology, water conservation and recycling
Sacramento Children's Museum	Rancho Cordova	Sacramento	Sacramento Valley	Children's	
Sacramento History Museum	Sacramento	Sacramento	Sacramento Valley	Local history	Includes California Gold Rush, agriculture, community, gold panning. Home of the Underground Tours of Old Sacramento.
Sacramento Valley Museum	Williams	Colusa	Sacramento Valley	Local history	Includes carriages, mining equipment, minerals, household items
San Diego State University Imperial Valley Campus Art Gallery	Calexico	Imperial	Imperial Valley	Art	Steppling Art Gallery
Scotty's Castle		Inyo	High Sierra	Historic house	Also known as Death Valley Ranch, 1930s period mansion, located in northern Death Valley National Park
Sharpsteen Museum	Calistoga	Napa	Napa Valley	Local history	website, history of the upper Napa Valley, along with the career memorabilia of founder Ben Sharpsteen (an animator for Walt Disney Studios)
Shenandoah Valley Museum	Plymouth	Amador	Gold Country	Agriculture	Wine-making and farming
Shoshone Museum	Shoshone	Inyo	High Sierra	Local history	Facebook site, area geology, wildlife, Native American culture and folklore
Sierra College Natural History Museum	Rocklin	Placer	Gold Country	Natural history	website, part of Sierra College, mammals mounts, animal skeletons, fossils, insects
Sierra Nevada Logging Museum	Arnold	Calaveras	Gold Country	Industry	History of logging in the Sierra Nevada area
Sutter's Fort State Historic Park	Sacramento	Sacramento	Sacramento Valley	Military	Includes reconstructed mid 19th-century period Sutter's Fort and the California State Indian Museum
Tahoe Maritime Museum	Homewood	Placer	High Sierra	Maritime	Includes maritime craft in service at Lake Tahoe, history of boating at Lake Tahoe, outboard motor collection, aquaplanes, water skis, fishing exhibits
Tallac Historic Site	South Lake Tahoe	El Dorado	High Sierra	Open air	Former rustic resort, includes Baldwin Museum, a former estate with exhibits on the significance of the estate families and the Washoe Tribe, the Pope Estate, the Valhalla Estate and several outbuildings
Tuolumne City Memorial Museum	Tuolumne	Tuolumne	Gold Country	Local history	Exhibits on pioneers, household and kitchen items, clothing, gold mining, lumber company and model train layout
Tuolumne County Museum	Sonora	Tuolumne	Gold Country	Local history	website, housed in an old jail, operated by the Tuolumne County Historical Society
UC Davis Design Museum	Davis	Yolo	Sacramento Valley	Design	website, includes architecture, costume, graphic design, textiles, new media and popular culture, part of the University of California, Davis
Underground Gold Miners Museum	Alleghany	Sierra	Gold Country	Mining	website, open by appointment and for events
United States Bicycling Hall of Fame	Davis	Yolo	Sacramento Valley	Sports	Formerly located in New Jersey, bicycling history, photos, trophies, medals, books, catalogs
Vikingsholm	South Lake Tahoe	El Dorado	High Sierra	Historic house	38-room mansion with Nordic influences
Watson Log Cabin	Tahoe City	Placer	High Sierra	Historic house	Operated by the North Lake Tahoe Historical Society, early 20th-century log cabin
Wells Fargo History Museum	Sacramento	Sacramento	Sacramento Valley	History	Two locations in Sacramento, one in the Pony Express Terminal, the other in the Wells Fargo Center; history of Wells Fargo Express, California Gold Rush
West Sacramento Historical Society History Gallery	West Sacramento	Yolo	Sacramento Valley	Local history	Exhibits in the West Sacramento Community Center
Western SkiSport Museum	Soda Springs	Nevada	Gold Country	Sports	website, history of winter ski sports in the western United States, operated by the Auburn Ski Club in the winter
Yolo County Historical Museum	Woodland	Yolo	Sacramento Valley	Historic house	Also known as Gibson House, period rooms from the 1850s to the 1930s, also exhibits of local history
Yosemite Mountain Sugar Pine Railroad	Fish Camp	Mariposa	High Sierra	Railroad	Heritage railroad and historic log cabin
Yosemite Museum	Yosemite National Park	Mariposa	Gold Country	Native American	Heritage and culture of the Ahwaneechee people who lived in the valley

== Defunct museums ==
- American Victorian Museum, Nevada City, also known as Teddy Bear Castle Museum,
- ARCO Center for Visual Art, Los Angeles
- Atascadero Historical Society Museum, closed due to the 2003 San Simeon earthquake, seeking new location
- Briggs Cunningham Museum, an automotive museum in Costa Mesa, closed in 1986 (website)
- California State Military Museum, Sacramento, closed in 2014
- Carole & Barry Kaye Museum of Miniatures, Los Angeles, closed 2001, collection can be seen online
- Celebrity Lingerie Hall of Fame, Hollywood, operated by Frederick's of Hollywood, museum closed in 2005, displayed sexy Frederick's underwear worn by famous stars, information
- Children's Discovery Museum of North San Diego County, Carlsbad, closed in 2006
- Copia, Napa, closed in 2008
- Exotic World Burlesque Museum, moved from Helendale to Las Vegas, Nevada
- Forrest Ackerman's Sci-Fi Mansion, Hollywood, science fiction memorabilia, closed in 2003, information
- Fort Roosevelt Natural Science and History Museum, Hanford
- Guinness World Record Museum, San Francisco location; a museum still exists in Hollywood
- Hays Antique Truck Museum, Woodland, collection moved to Reno, Nevada in 2013,
- Helen Moe Antique Doll Museum, Paso Robles
- Hollywood Entertainment Museum, archive of former website, closed in 2006 (website also closed by 2014)
- Hollywood Erotic Museum
- Imaginarium of Nevada County, Nevada City, closed in 2010
- Kenneth G. Fiske Museum of Musical Instruments, Claremont, located at the Claremont Colleges, collection sold to Musical Instrument Museum in Phoenix
- Lake Arrowhead Children's Museum, closed in 2006
- Lechler Museum, Piru, closed in 2000 and contents auctioned interview with owner
- Max Factor Museum, Los Angeles, closed in 1996, information, museum about Max Factor and movie make-up history; building now houses the Hollywood Museum
- Mingei International Museum, Escondido location closed in June 2010
- Movieland Wax Museum
- Ripley's Believe It or Not!, Buena Park location closed in 2009
- Roy Rogers-Dale Evans Museum, Victorville, moved to Branson, Missouri, official site
- San Diego Computer Museum, holdings gifted to the San Diego State University Library, now web-based only
- Treasure Island Museum, San Francisco, website, closed in 1997 but trying to reopen, interpreted the American experience in the Pacific as lived by the men and women of the U.S. sea services: the Navy, Marine Corps, and Coast Guard

== See also ==
- Arboreta in California
- Aquaria in California
- Botanical gardens in California
- Historic landmarks in California
- Forts in California
- List of historical societies in California
- Museums list
- Nature Centers in California
- Observatories in California
- Registered Historic Places in California
