= Sierra Nevada Logging Museum =

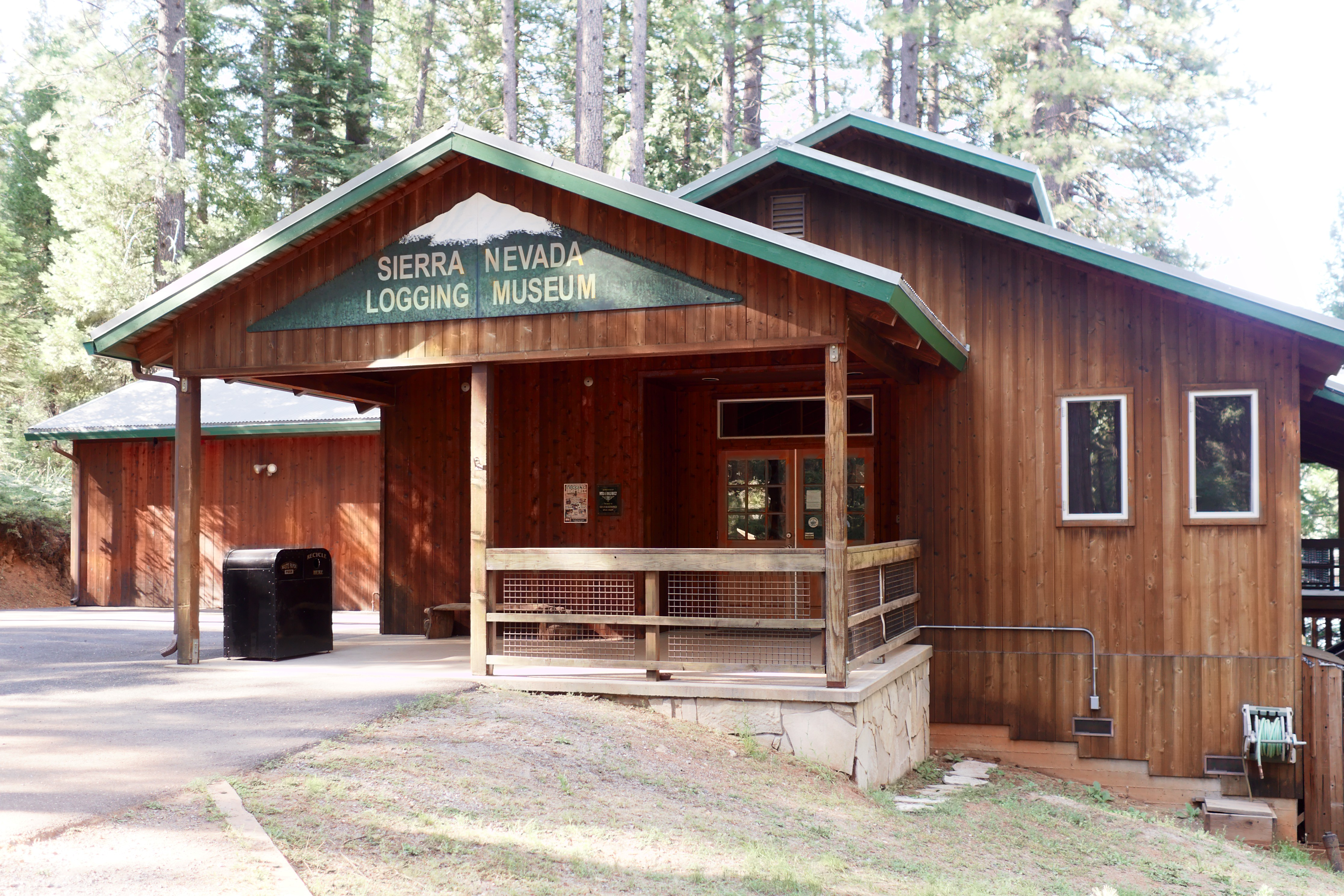

- Location within California
- Location: Arnold, California
- Coordinates: 38.26587°N 120.34417°W
- Type: History museum
- Website: Official website

The Sierra Nevada Logging Museum is a museum dedicated to preserving the history of logging in the Sierra Nevada region. The museum is located on California State Route 4 in the Stanislaus National Forest, near Arnold, in Calaveras County, California, United States.

== Introduction ==
The Sierra Nevada Logging Museum tells the history of loggers and logging-related industries in the Sierra Nevada mountains of California – from the discovery of gold in 1848 and California Gold Rush to the present day. The geographic scope of the Museum encompasses the 18 counties of the Sierra Nevada range, from Lassen County in the North to Kern County in the South.

== Facilities ==
The Sierra Nevada Logging Museum is located in the community of White Pines on a 7-acre (28,000 m^{2}) site, originally occupied by the historic logging and mill workers' camp of the Blagen Lumber Company, which operated from 1938 to 1962. The museum is in a 2,400-square-foot (220 m^{2}) building, on a forested slope above White Pines Lake (elevation 4,000 feet). It has an indoor exhibit space, as well as outdoor exhibits of large logging equipment and artifacts.

=== Exhibits ===
==== Indoor museum ====
Museum exhibits highlight economic, technological, social, and cultural contributions made throughout the region by loggers and the logging industry. Interior displays include working models of sawmills and logging camps, historic logging photos, dioramas illustrating the evolution of logging from the 1850s to the present day, and a large collection of logging tools such as handsaws, drag saws and chainsaws, peaveys and canthooks, broadaxes and felling axes. Also, a full-size scene of a 1930s-era logging camp family cabin, and touch-screen displays of logging sights and sounds are highlights of the museum.

==== Open-air museum ====
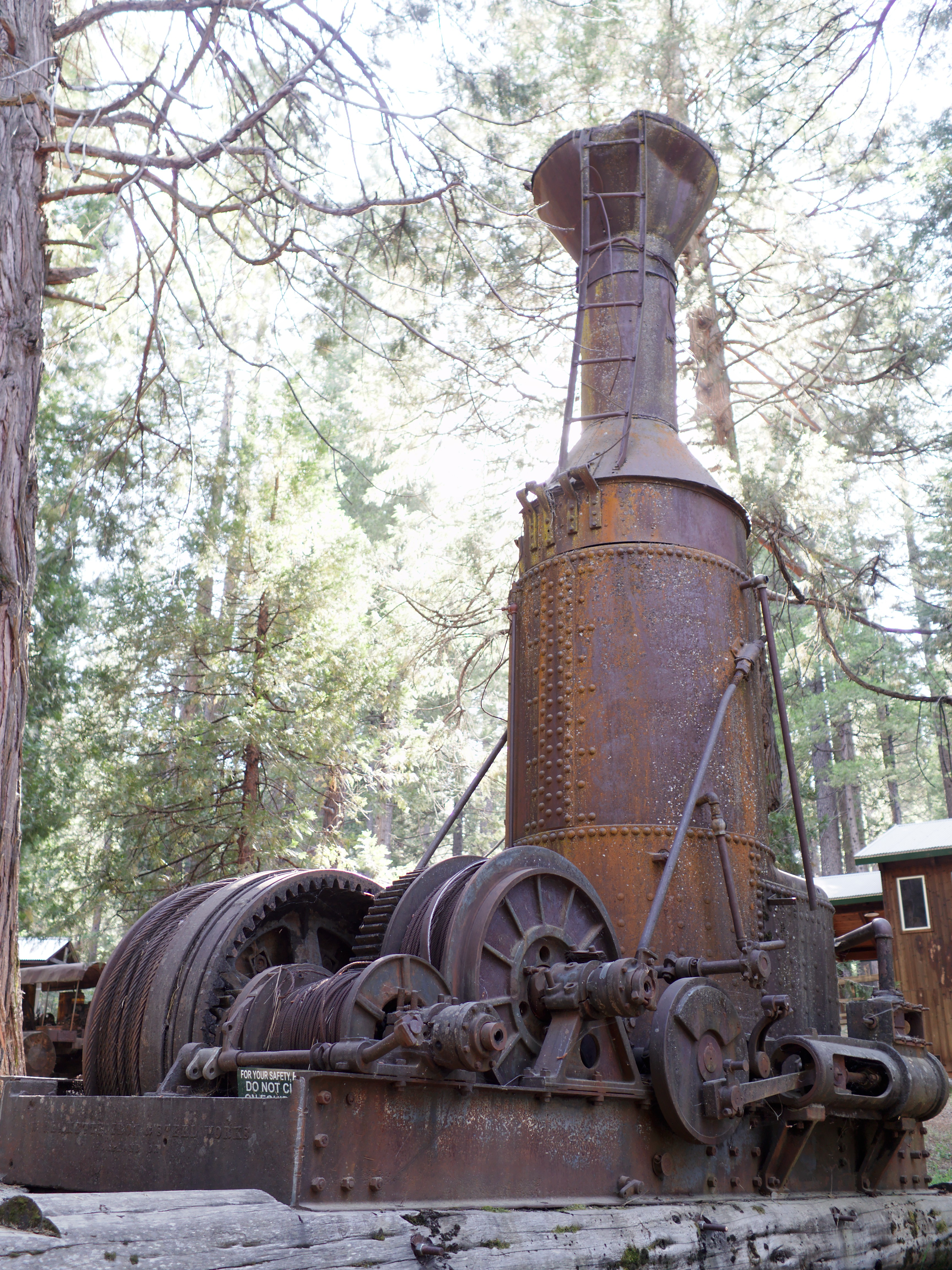
Steam donkey

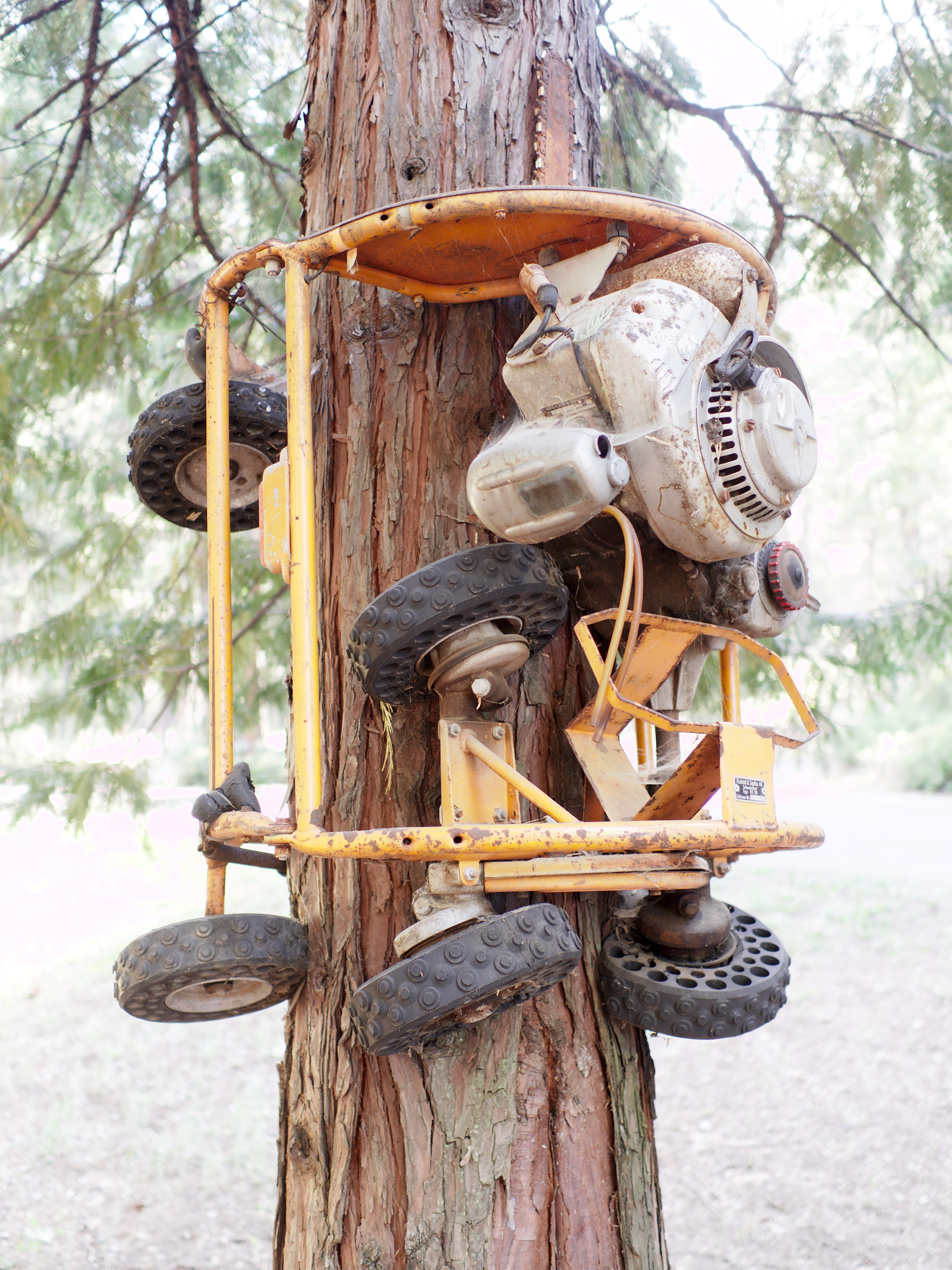
Automatic tree pruner

Interpretive trails guide visitors to historic artifacts: a Willamette Steam donkey that first operated in Tuolumne County, a "two-man" sawmill, a 1920 Shay logging locomotive (under restoration), several enormous logging arches, three caterpillar tractors from the 1930s, a drying-yard lumber carrier, a historic Adams horse-drawn grader used for road clearing in the woods, and many others.

== Surrounding amenities ==
The 7 acres (28,000 m^{2}) location is for recreational as well as educational use. An amphitheater, picnic tables, and barbecue pits in the forest and along the lakefront. From the museum, easy walking trails lead to swimming, boating and fishing at White Pines Park, and to a hiking trail all the way around White Pines Lake, passing the site of the old Blagen Sawmill and its log pond.

== See also ==
- Sierra Nevada logging
- History of the lumber industry in the United States
- Lumberjack
- Category: Log transport
- Logging
  - Clearcutting
  - Forester
  - Forestry
  - Old-growth forest
  - Reforestation
