= Sacramento Valley =

Area of the Central Valley in California

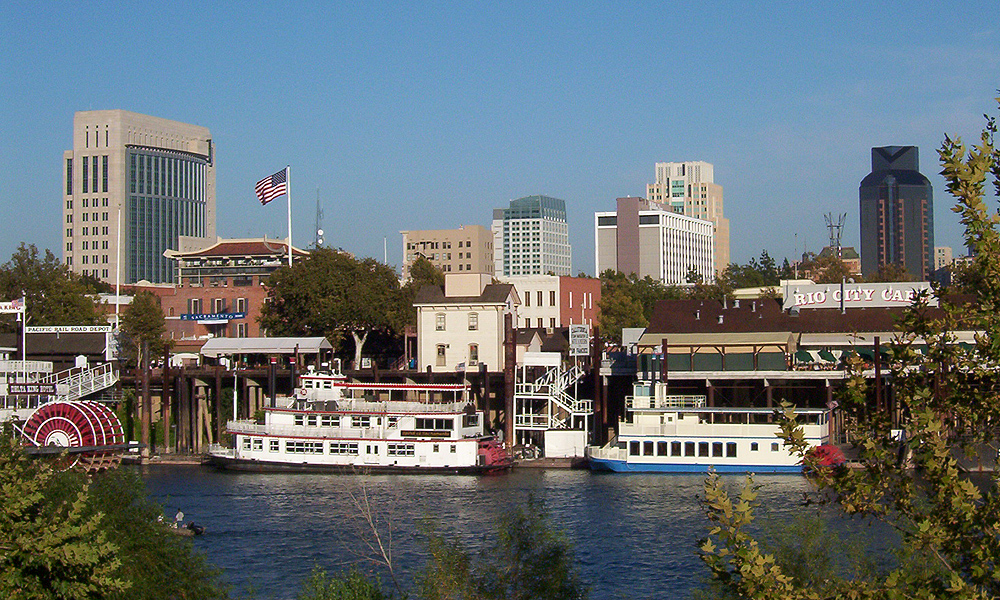
- Sacramento

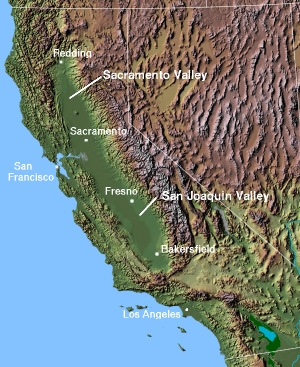
- The Central Valley of California

Geography
- Location: California, United States
- Population centers: Redding, Chico, Yuba City, Sacramento
- Borders on: Sierra Nevada (east), Cascade Range, Klamath Mountains (north), Coast Range (west), Sacramento–San Joaquin River Delta (south)
- Coordinates: 39°00′N 121°30′W
- Rivers: Sacramento River

The Sacramento Valley is the area of the Central Valley of the U.S. state of California that lies north of the Sacramento–San Joaquin River Delta and is drained by the Sacramento River. It encompasses all or parts of ten Northern California counties. Although many areas of the Sacramento Valley are rural, it contains several urban areas, including the state capital, Sacramento.

Comparatively water-rich relative to the other segment of the Central Valley to the south, the San Joaquin Valley, there are slight differences in the crops typically grown in the Sacramento Valley. Much wetter winters (averaging between 25–60 inches (640–1,520 mm) of annual precipitation in the nearby foothills) and an extensive system of irrigation canals allows for the economic viability of water-thirsty crops such as rice and rootstock walnuts. Since 2010, statewide droughts in California (combined with unprecedented summer heat) have strained both the Sacramento Valley's and the Sacramento metropolitan region's water security.

== Geography ==
The Sacramento River and its tributaries are a significant part of the geography of the Sacramento Valley. Rising in the various mountain ranges (the various Northern Coast Ranges to the west, the southern Siskiyou Mountains to the north, and the northern Sierra Nevada to the east) that define the shape of the valley, they provide water for agricultural, industrial, residential, and recreation uses. Most of the rivers are heavily dammed and diverted. In more recent years, statewide droughts in California have further strained the Sacramento Valley's water security.

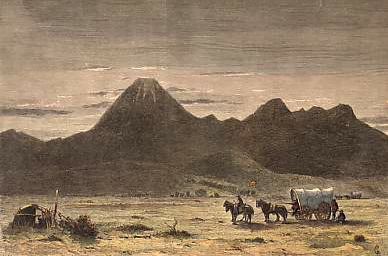
19th century etching depicting the Sutter Buttes in the Sacramento Valley

The terrain of the Sacramento Valley is primarily flat grasslands that become lusher as one moves east from the rain shadow of the Coast Ranges toward the Sierra. Unlike the San Joaquin Valley, which in its pre-irrigation state was a vegetation-hostile desert, the somewhat less arid Sacramento Valley had significant tracts of forest prior to the arrival of settlers of European ancestry. Most of it was cut down during the California Gold Rush and the ensuing wave of American settlement, although there are still some heavily tree-populated areas, such as the greater Sacramento area.

Foothills become more common from just south of Corning to Shasta Lake City. These are known as the Valley Hills and begin south of the Tehama-Glenn County line near Corning. There are also a few hills in Red Bluff and Corning. There is one major range of foothills between Cottonwood and Red Bluff known as the Cottonwood Hills (a.k.a. 9-mile Hill), and there is the Cottonwood Ridge between Anderson and Cottonwood. There are some hills in Redding, a few more than Red Bluff, and north of Redding it is mainly foothills.

One distinctive geographic feature of the Sacramento Valley is the Sutter Buttes. Nicknamed the smallest mountain range in the world, it consists of the remnants of an extinct volcano and is located just outside Yuba City, 44 miles (71 km) north of Sacramento.

== Agriculture ==
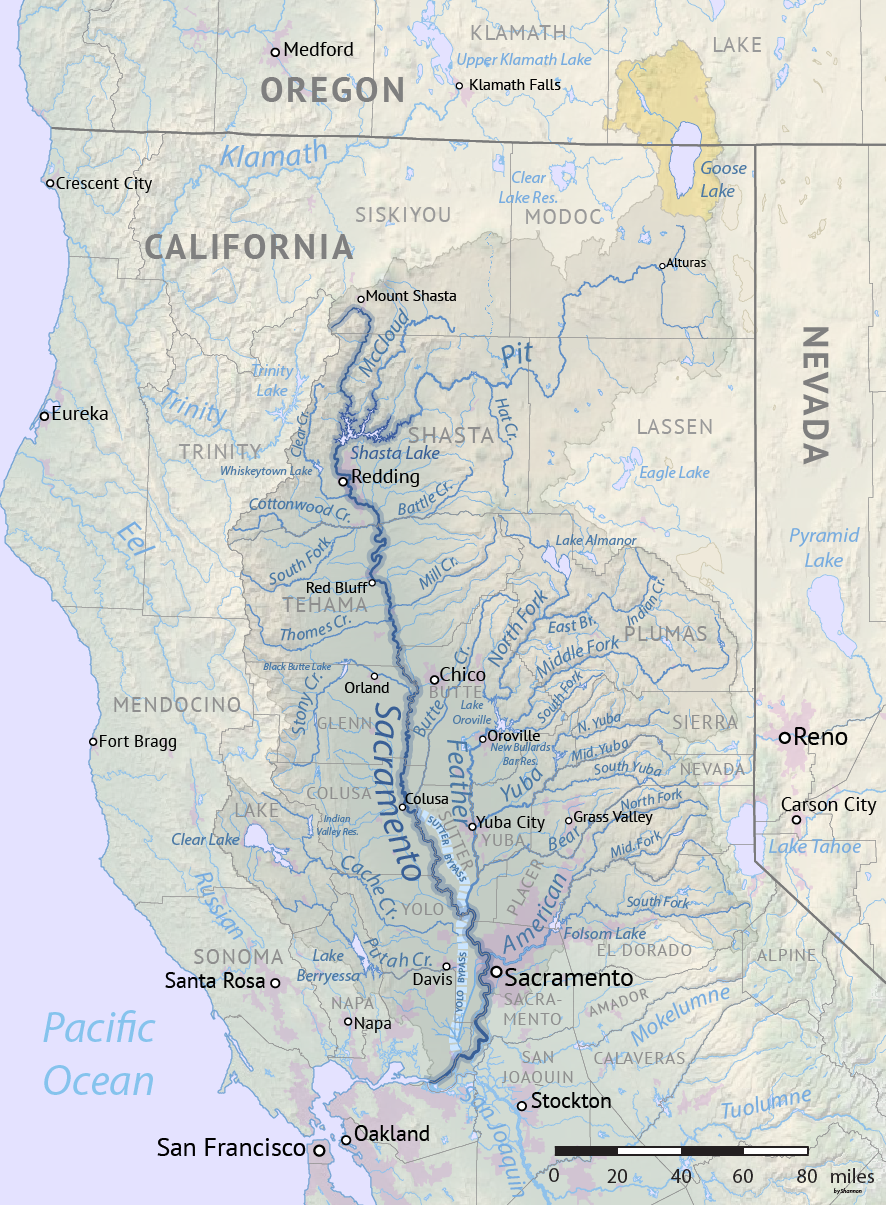
The Sacramento River watershed, including the valley and adjacent highlands.

Citrus and nut orchards and cattle ranches are common to both halves of the Central Valley. The Sacramento Valley's agricultural industry also resembles that of the San Joaquin Valley to the south. Nuts, such as almonds and walnuts, are of greater importance north of the Delta, and rice, nonviable in the drier San Joaquin Valley, is a major crop. While the region is wetter, soils are somewhat poorer in the Sacramento Valley; this means some crops, particularly vegetables, are less profitable compared to the San Joaquin Valley. The Sacramento Valley is also not as extensively cultivated; there are many more smallholdings and more uncultivated arable land compared to south of the Delta.

The town of Corning produces olives for oil extraction and for consumption as fruit. The Sunsweet Growers Incorporated headquarters are in Yuba City. The valley controls more than two-thirds of the worldwide prune market through the over 400 growers in California.

== Climate ==
Weather patterns in the Sacramento Valley are very similar to those in the San Joaquin Valley to the south, although the humidity and precipitation tend to be a bit higher. Summers are the dry season, with average daytime temperatures in the low to high 90s °F (low to mid 30s °C) but triple digits (38 °C and above) are a common occurrence, especially in Chico, Redding, Red Bluff, and Sacramento. Redding in particular has been notorious for having extremely hot summers despite its northern latitude within the United States, with temperatures often matching and even exceeding that of Phoenix, Arizona in its hottest years; the city's annual high temperature averages at 112 °F (44 °C).

In the summer, the "Delta Breeze", which comes in from the San Francisco Bay Area, is known for bringing cooler temperatures and higher humidity to the southern parts of the valley. While it brings comparative relief for residents of Sacramento and Roseville, it often results in somewhat muggy conditions, with dew points sometimes reaching above 70 °F (20 °C) and occasionally pushing the heat index above 115 °F (46 °C) on the hottest days. At times the Breeze is gusty with wind speeds up to 30 mph (50 km/h) in the valley and 45 mph (70 km/h) in the windy delta region. This Breeze can also bring morning low clouds at times into the region, but the clouds generally burn off quickly and temperatures stay cool. Summer-like conditions continue into early to mid-September but weather starts to change to cooler, wetter, foggier weather during October which gives trees vibrant autumn foliage.

Winters, also known as the rainy season, are generally mild to cool, foggy and wet. The valley and lower foothills are completely snowless outside of exceptional years where some flurries may occur. The rainy season runs from November to early-April, with some rainfall in September, October, and May. Up north, the temperature averages in the mid-40s °F (mid-to-high single digits °C) and lows reaching to the low-10s °F (-10 to -12 °C), colder in the northern part of the valley and colder still in the foothills and frost can occur almost anywhere. Farther south near Sacramento, temperatures tend to stay between the low-50s and high-60s °F (10-20 °C), with nighttime temperatures dropping to the mid-30s and 40s °F (1-7 °C). Lower-elevation snowfall (in a relative sense) is more consistent in the foothills immediately above Sacramento and Folsom than anywhere else in California; Pollock Pines at 3,980 feet (1,210 m), gets an average of 65 inches (170 cm) of snow every winter, nearly double that of Yosemite Valley and more than triple that of Lucerne, Switzerland.

During the rainy season, the Sacramento Valley is prone to strong thunderstorms and tornadoes, mostly of EF0 or EF1 intensity, especially in Colusa County and areas around Corning and Orland. Flooding does occur at times during wetter periods, usually November to March. Snow in the valley is rare, although Redding and Red Bluff, being at the north end of the valley, often experience a light dusting or two per year. Chico may get a rain-snow mix every few years, but, on the average, only snows about every 5 years. Farther south in Sacramento, snow rarely occurs. During the autumn and winter months, the entire Central Valley is susceptible to dense tule fog that makes driving hazardous, especially at night and especially south of Corning. The fog can last for weeks depending on how weak the wind is. In more recent years, statewide droughts in California have further strained both the Sacramento Valley's and the San Joaquin Valley's water security.

Climate data for Sacramento, California (Sacramento Executive Airport), 1991–2020 normals, extremes 1941–present (Note: Official records for Sacramento were kept exclusively at the airport since 10 November 1941.)
Month	Jan	Feb	Mar	Apr	May	Jun	Jul	Aug	Sep	Oct	Nov	Dec	Year
Record high °F (°C)	76 (24)	78 (26)	88 (31)	95 (35)	105 (41)	115 (46)	114 (46)	112 (44)	114 (46)	104 (40)	87 (31)	74 (23)	115 (46)
Mean maximum °F (°C)	65.2 (18.4)	71.1 (21.7)	78.1 (25.6)	87.4 (30.8)	95.3 (35.2)	103.1 (39.5)	105.3 (40.7)	104.1 (40.1)	100.6 (38.1)	91.8 (33.2)	76.5 (24.7)	65.1 (18.4)	107.0 (41.7)
Mean daily maximum °F (°C)	56.0 (13.3)	61.3 (16.3)	66.3 (19.1)	72.1 (22.3)	80.3 (26.8)	87.9 (31.1)	92.6 (33.7)	91.9 (33.3)	88.5 (31.4)	78.8 (26.0)	65.0 (18.3)	56.0 (13.3)	74.7 (23.7)
Daily mean °F (°C)	47.6 (8.7)	51.4 (10.8)	55.4 (13.0)	59.5 (15.3)	66.1 (18.9)	72.2 (22.3)	75.9 (24.4)	75.3 (24.1)	72.5 (22.5)	64.5 (18.1)	53.9 (12.2)	47.3 (8.5)	61.8 (16.6)
Mean daily minimum °F (°C)	39.2 (4.0)	41.5 (5.3)	44.5 (6.9)	47.0 (8.3)	52.0 (11.1)	56.5 (13.6)	59.2 (15.1)	58.8 (14.9)	56.5 (13.6)	50.3 (10.2)	42.7 (5.9)	38.5 (3.6)	48.9 (9.4)
Mean minimum °F (°C)	29.1 (−1.6)	31.7 (−0.2)	35.1 (1.7)	37.9 (3.3)	44.1 (6.7)	49.5 (9.7)	54.1 (12.3)	53.8 (12.1)	49.6 (9.8)	41.7 (5.4)	32.7 (0.4)	28.7 (−1.8)	26.9 (−2.8)
Record low °F (°C)	20 (−7)	23 (−5)	26 (−3)	31 (−1)	34 (1)	41 (5)	48 (9)	48 (9)	42 (6)	35 (2)	26 (−3)	18 (−8)	18 (−8)
Average precipitation inches (mm)	3.66 (93)	3.49 (89)	2.68 (68)	1.26 (32)	0.75 (19)	0.23 (5.8)	0.00 (0.00)	0.04 (1.0)	0.09 (2.3)	0.85 (22)	1.66 (42)	3.43 (87)	18.14 (461)
Average precipitation days (≥ 0.01 in)	10.0	9.1	9.0	5.1	3.6	1.1	0.1	0.2	0.7	3.1	6.1	9.6	57.7
Average relative humidity (%)	83.3	76.8	71.6	64.5	58.9	55.0	53.2	55.7	57.0	63.1	75.6	82.9	66.5
Average dew point °F (°C)	39.4 (4.1)	42.1 (5.6)	42.8 (6.0)	43.7 (6.5)	46.9 (8.3)	50.4 (10.2)	53.1 (11.7)	53.4 (11.9)	50.9 (10.5)	47.5 (8.6)	43.7 (6.5)	39.2 (4.0)	46.1 (7.8)
Mean monthly sunshine hours	145.5	201.3	278.0	329.6	406.3	419.5	440.2	406.9	347.8	296.7	194.9	141.1	3,607.8
Percentage possible sunshine	48	67	75	83	92	94	98	96	93	86	64	48	81
Source: NOAA (relative humidity, dew point and sun 1961–1990)

Climate data for Sacramento 5 ESE, California (Sacramento State), 1991–2020 normals, extremes 1877–present
Month	Jan	Feb	Mar	Apr	May	Jun	Jul	Aug	Sep	Oct	Nov	Dec	Year
Record high °F (°C)	79 (26)	80 (27)	90 (32)	98 (37)	107 (42)	112 (44)	114 (46)	112 (44)	116 (47)	102 (39)	86 (30)	72 (22)	116 (47)
Mean maximum °F (°C)	66.4 (19.1)	72.5 (22.5)	80.6 (27.0)	89.5 (31.9)	97.1 (36.2)	104.4 (40.2)	106.7 (41.5)	105.5 (40.8)	102.0 (38.9)	92.3 (33.5)	77.3 (25.2)	65.9 (18.8)	108.1 (42.3)
Mean daily maximum °F (°C)	56.5 (13.6)	62.2 (16.8)	67.8 (19.9)	73.5 (23.1)	81.3 (27.4)	89.0 (31.7)	94.4 (34.7)	93.5 (34.2)	89.3 (31.8)	78.9 (26.1)	65.3 (18.5)	56.4 (13.6)	75.7 (24.3)
Daily mean °F (°C)	48.8 (9.3)	52.9 (11.6)	57.2 (14.0)	61.4 (16.3)	67.7 (19.8)	73.9 (23.3)	77.9 (25.5)	77.3 (25.2)	74.0 (23.3)	65.9 (18.8)	55.3 (12.9)	48.5 (9.2)	63.4 (17.4)
Mean daily minimum °F (°C)	41.1 (5.1)	43.7 (6.5)	46.7 (8.2)	49.3 (9.6)	54.0 (12.2)	58.7 (14.8)	61.4 (16.3)	61.0 (16.1)	58.8 (14.9)	52.9 (11.6)	45.3 (7.4)	40.7 (4.8)	51.1 (10.6)
Mean minimum °F (°C)	32.5 (0.3)	35.4 (1.9)	38.8 (3.8)	41.6 (5.3)	47.2 (8.4)	51.9 (11.1)	55.9 (13.3)	55.9 (13.3)	52.4 (11.3)	45.1 (7.3)	36.2 (2.3)	31.9 (−0.1)	30.5 (−0.8)
Record low °F (°C)	19 (−7)	21 (−6)	29 (−2)	34 (1)	37 (3)	43 (6)	47 (8)	48 (9)	44 (7)	34 (1)	27 (−3)	17 (−8)	17 (−8)
Average precipitation inches (mm)	3.87 (98)	3.63 (92)	2.82 (72)	1.44 (37)	0.86 (22)	0.21 (5.3)	0.00 (0.00)	0.02 (0.51)	0.15 (3.8)	0.93 (24)	1.78 (45)	3.49 (89)	19.20 (488)
Average precipitation days (≥ 0.01 in)	10.8	9.6	9.2	5.3	3.7	1.2	0.1	0.2	0.8	3.1	6.8	10.1	60.9
Source: NOAA, Western Regional Climate Center

Climate data for Chico, California (1981–2010 normals)
Month	Jan	Feb	Mar	Apr	May	Jun	Jul	Aug	Sep	Oct	Nov	Dec	Year
Record high °F (°C)	77 (25)	82 (28)	93 (34)	98 (37)	108 (42)	115 (46)	117 (47)	116 (47)	114 (46)	107 (42)	91 (33)	78 (26)	117 (47)
Mean daily maximum °F (°C)	55.1 (12.8)	61.1 (16.2)	66.3 (19.1)	72.6 (22.6)	81.3 (27.4)	88.7 (31.5)	94.2 (34.6)	93.7 (34.3)	89.7 (32.1)	79.4 (26.3)	64.8 (18.2)	55.6 (13.1)	75.3 (24.1)
Mean daily minimum °F (°C)	35.4 (1.9)	38.3 (3.5)	41.5 (5.3)	45.2 (7.3)	51.9 (11.1)	56.7 (13.7)	60.5 (15.8)	58.3 (14.6)	54.6 (12.6)	46.9 (8.3)	39.9 (4.4)	35.3 (1.8)	47.1 (8.4)
Record low °F (°C)	12 (−11)	16 (−9)	23 (−5)	27 (−3)	30 (−1)	38 (3)	40 (4)	38 (3)	35 (2)	23 (−5)	20 (−7)	11 (−12)	11 (−12)
Average precipitation inches (mm)	4.86 (123)	4.42 (112)	4.29 (109)	1.75 (44)	1.04 (26)	.48 (12)	.02 (0.51)	.08 (2.0)	.42 (11)	1.42 (36)	3.28 (83)	4.61 (117)	26.67 (677)
Source: Western Regional Climate Center

Climate data for Redding, California (1961–1990)
Month	Jan	Feb	Mar	Apr	May	Jun	Jul	Aug	Sep	Oct	Nov	Dec	Year
Mean daily maximum °F (°C)	57.3 (14.1)	61.3 (16.3)	62.5 (16.9)	69.9 (21.1)	80.5 (26.9)	90.4 (32.4)	98.3 (36.8)	95.7 (35.4)	89.3 (31.8)	77.6 (25.3)	62.1 (16.7)	54.7 (12.6)	74.8 (23.8)
Daily mean °F (°C)	45.5 (7.5)	50.7 (10.4)	52.5 (11.4)	58 (14)	66.4 (19.1)	76.1 (24.5)	81.5 (27.5)	79.5 (26.4)	74.1 (23.4)	63.5 (17.5)	51.8 (11.0)	45 (7)	62 (17)
Mean daily minimum °F (°C)	35.7 (2.1)	40 (4)	41.7 (5.4)	46 (8)	52.3 (11.3)	61.8 (16.6)	64.7 (18.2)	63.1 (17.3)	58.8 (14.9)	49.2 (9.6)	41.4 (5.2)	35.2 (1.8)	49.2 (9.6)
Average precipitation inches (mm)	6.06 (154)	4.45 (113)	4.38 (111)	2.08 (53)	1.27 (32)	0.56 (14)	0.17 (4.3)	0.46 (12)	0.91 (23)	2.24 (57)	5.21 (132)	5.51 (140)	33.3 (850)
Average precipitation days	13.1	8.7	12.3	7.9	7.2	4.0	0.6	0.9	2.1	4.1	6.8	10.2	77.9
Mean monthly sunshine hours	226	256	312	351	395	423	451	421	338	314	251	204	3,942

== Transportation ==
Interstate 5 is the primary route through the Sacramento Valley, traveling north–south roughly along the valley's western edge. Interstate 80 cuts a northeast-to-southwest swath through the southern end of the valley, mostly through Sacramento and Yolo Counties, and ends at the San Francisco-Oakland Bay Bridge. Several secondary routes connect the two roads, including Interstate 505 and State Route 113. The Sacramento area has a web of urban freeways.

Other principal routes in the region include State Route 99, which runs along the valley's eastern edge, roughly parallel to I-5, from Sacramento until its northern terminus in Red Bluff; State Route 20, which traverses the valley from west to east on its route from State Route 1 in Mendocino County to the Donner Pass; State Route 49, named in honor of the California Gold Rush and running through many old mining towns in the foothills of the valley; and State Route 45, which runs along the course of the Sacramento River roughly ten miles (16 km) east of I-5.

The Union Pacific Railroad serves the valley, with its principal north–south line from Oakland, California to Portland, Oregon, via Sacramento, Marysville, Chico, and Redding. This is also the route of Amtrak's Coast Starlight passenger train. The Union Pacific also has two east–west lines, through Donner Pass (the former Central Pacific Railroad), and through the Feather River gorge (the former Western Pacific Railroad). Amtrak's California Zephyr uses the Donner Pass route. The BNSF Railway has a line from Klamath Falls, Oregon, to a junction with the Union Pacific Feather River line at Keddie. The BNSF has trackage rights on both the UP east–west routes. In addition, the California Northern Railroad operates the former Southern Pacific Railroad line on the west side of the valley from Davis to Tehama (near Red Bluff).

== Educational institutions ==
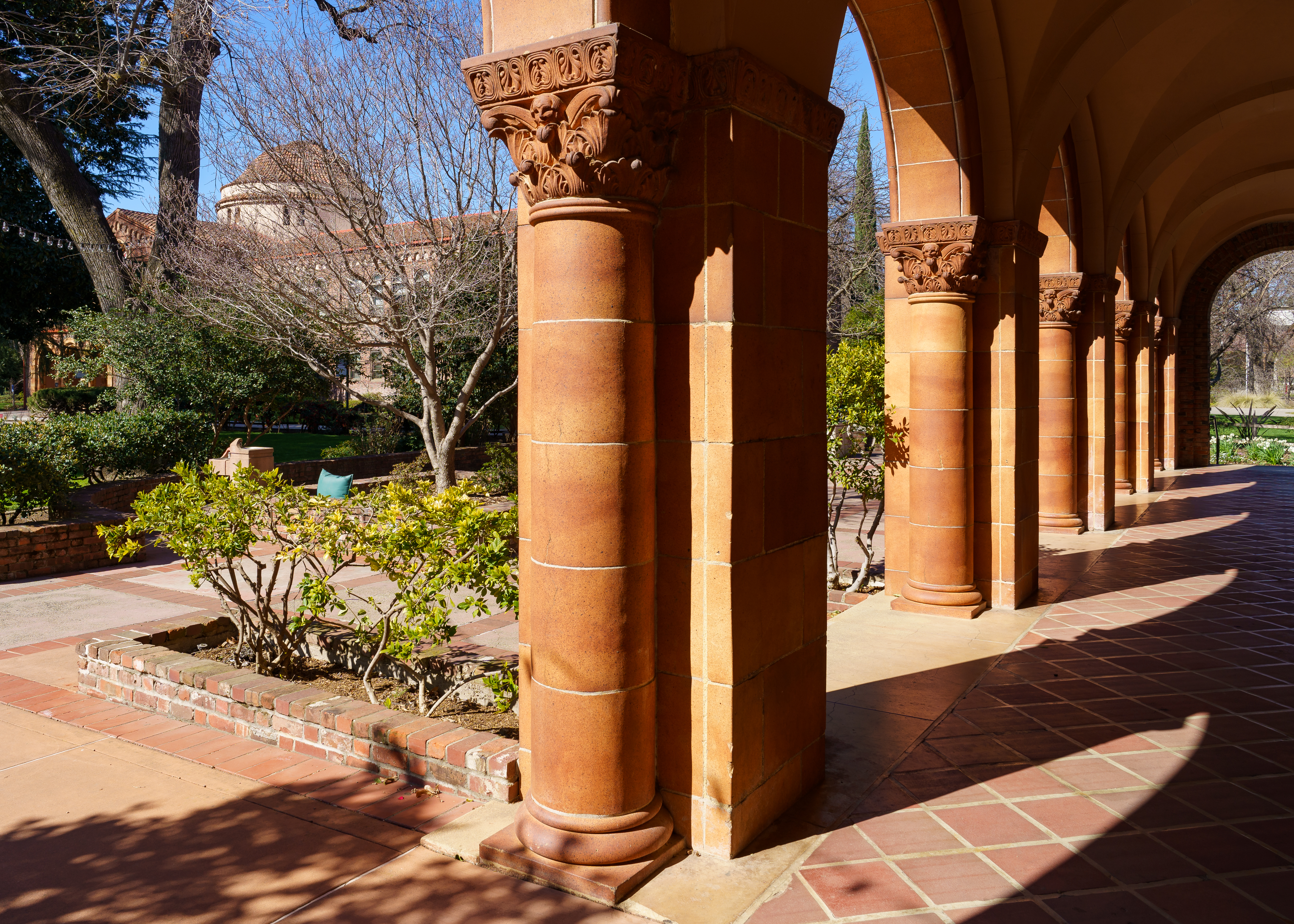
California State University, Chico was founded in 1887.

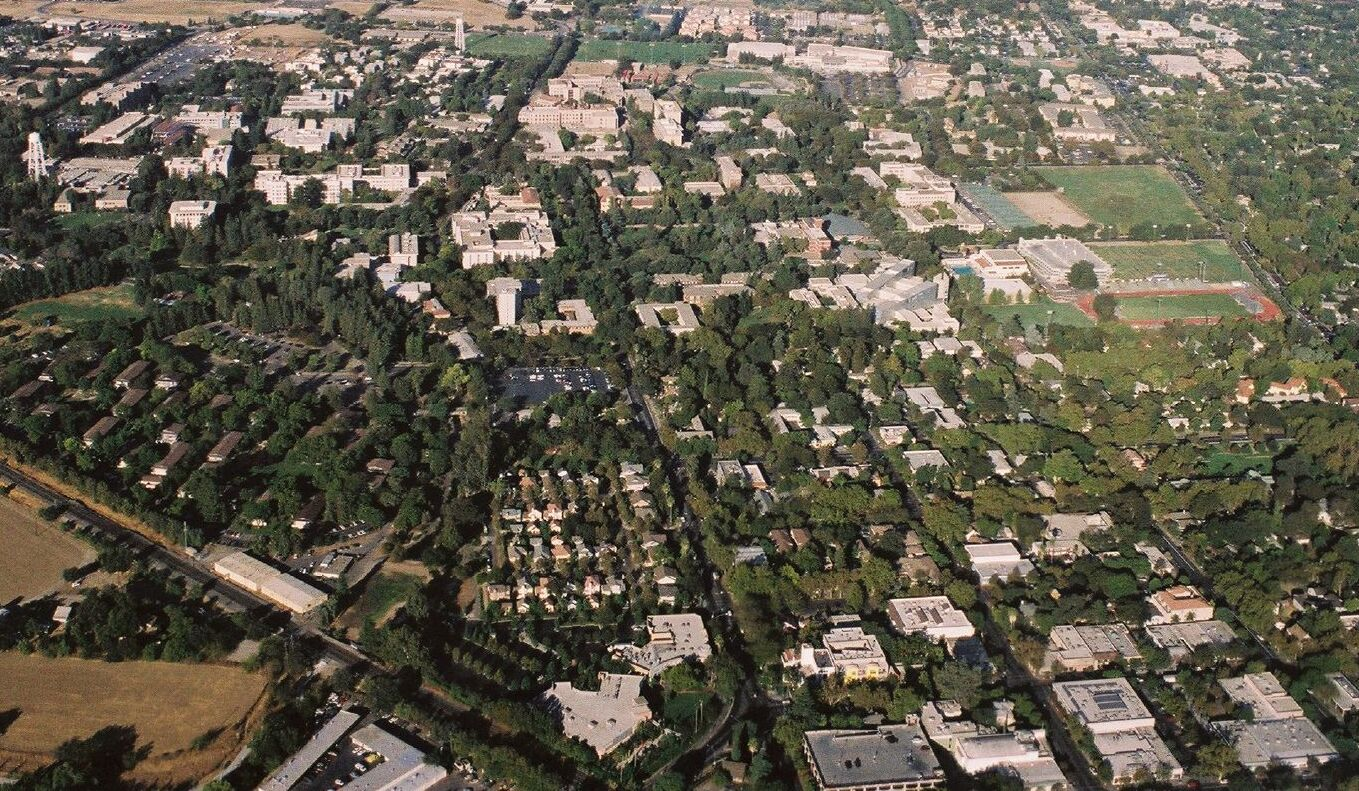
University of California, Davis.

- University of California, Davis
- California State University, Chico
- California State University, Sacramento
- Simpson University, in Redding
- William Jessup University, in Rocklin
- McGeorge School of Law in Sacramento
- American River College, in Sacramento
- Butte College, in Oroville
- Cosumnes River College, in Sacramento
- Folsom Lake College, in Folsom
- Sacramento City College, in Sacramento
- Shasta College, in Redding
- Sierra College, in Rocklin
- Solano Community College, Vacaville Center, in Vacaville
- Woodland Community College, in Woodland
- Yuba Community College, in Marysville

== Professional sports teams ==
=== National Basketball Association (NBA) ===
- Sacramento Kings

=== Major League Baseball (MLB) ===
- Athletics

=== Pacific Coast League (minor league baseball) ===
- Sacramento River Cats

=== Independent Women's Football League ===
- Sacramento Sirens

=== Women's Premier Soccer League ===
- California Storm
- Sacramento Pride

=== United Soccer League (USL) ===
- Sacramento Republic

== Cities ==
=== Cities with over 500,000 inhabitants ===
- Sacramento

=== Cities with 100,000 to 400,000 inhabitants ===
- Chico
- Elk Grove
- Roseville
- Vacaville

=== Cities with 50,000 to 100,000 inhabitants ===
- Citrus Heights
- Davis
- Folsom
- Rancho Cordova
- Redding
- Rocklin
- West Sacramento
- Woodland
- Yuba City

=== Cities with 10,000 to 50,000 inhabitants ===
- Anderson
- Dixon
- Galt
- Lincoln
- Marysville
- Oroville
- Red Bluff
- Shasta Lake

=== Cities with under 10,000 inhabitants ===
- Biggs
- Colusa
- Corning
- Gridley
- Isleton
- Live Oak
- Loomis
- Orland
- Paradise
- Rio Vista
- Sutter
- Tehama
- Wheatland
- Williams
- Willows
- Winters

== See also ==
- Sacramento Valley Museum
- Sacramento Valley Railroad (1852–77)
- Sacramento Valley and Eastern Railway (1908–1930s)
- Leonard M. Landsborough (ca. 1858–1927) — Sacramento Valley landowner and legislator for the area.
- John Buttencourt Avila — father of the sweet potato industry.
- Sacramento Valley National Cemetery
