= Reiff's Antique Gas Station Automotive Museum =

Car museum in California, US

Coordinates: 38.67465°N 121.78195°W

Reiff's Gas Station Museum was a museum of American car memorabilia in Woodland, California. It was founded in 2000.

The museum collection included antique gas pumps, an antique gas station, a 1956 Chevrolet tow truck, a diner, a general store, a movie theater, a car crash, an airplane crash, vintage gas station signs and logos .

The museum started in the residence of Mark Reiff. It covered 10,000 square feet (900 m2) of exhibit space. A meeting room of 650 square feet (60 m2) and an outdoor patio of 900 square feet (84 m2) .

The museum also provided photo shoot locations. Owners brought their vintage cars to be photographed in the antique scenes within the museum. The museum hosted the annual Reiff's Street Bash each June. It is now permanently closed.
