= Museum of Sierra Ski History and 1960 Winter Olympics =

== History and Founding ==
The Museum of Sierra Ski History and 1960 Winter Olympics was founded in May 2013 as Sierra Ski Museum LLC (originally Tahoe Museum LLC) by Stan Batiste, Maryann Batiste, and David C. Antonucci. The museum operates as a public benefit organization.

Stan Batiste, a surgeon from Granite Bay, California, and his wife Maryann conceived the idea for the museum to share their collection of rare 1960 Winter Olympics artifacts and memorabilia with the public. Stan has deep roots in the Lake Tahoe region, having been raised as a summer resident in Cedar Flat where his parents built a cabin in 1957.

== Collections ==
The Batiste family has loaned their extensive collection of 1960 Winter Olympic artifacts to the museum, believing that "the value of their collection is in getting it back to the people of Tahoe and Squaw Valley in a meaningful way." The collection includes hundreds of ski artifacts spanning over 150 years of Sierra ski history, from early gold rush era skis to modern Olympic memorabilia.

Additional exhibits include contributions from David Antonucci's collection of artifacts from the Olympic cross-country ski venue on Tahoe's West Shore, the Auburn Ski Club, longboard skier Craig Beck, and memorabilia from World Cup skiers Daron Rahlves, Julia Mancuso, and Travis Ganong.

The museum's displays include ski equipment, posters, trophies, clothing, profiles of local athletes, official Olympic items (skis, racing bibs, official results, promotional literature), and conceptual drawings prepared by Walt Disney for the 1960 Winter Games. Notable items include the Olympic rings that hung at the cross-country venue.

== Locations ==
The museum's displays have been housed in multiple locations throughout Tahoe City. Originally located at the Boatworks Mall at 760 North Lake Boulevard in an 1,800 square-foot space, the collection has also been exhibited at the Gatekeepers Museum in Tahoe City through a partnership with the North Lake Tahoe Historical Society.

== Partnerships ==
The Museum of Sierra Ski History operates as a cooperative venture with the Boatworks owners and the SNOW Sports Museum Foundation (formerly Squaw Valley Ski Museum Foundation). The museum partners with several regional organizations including the Lake Tahoe Ski Club, Auburn Ski Club, and North Lake Tahoe Historical Society.

== Related Community Contributions ==
The Batiste family has made several additional contributions to historical preservation in the Lake Tahoe region. These include funding for the Mark Twain historical marker and interpretive panel in Carnelian Bay. David C. Antonucci, co-founder of the Museum of Sierra Ski History, served as the lead researcher for the Mark Twain Timber Claim Adventure Trail project, which includes interpretive panels at multiple North Shore locations.
