= Logging in the Sierra Nevada =

Range map of the Sierra Nevada

Logging in the Sierra Nevada arose from the desire for economic growth throughout California. The California Gold Rush created a high demand for timber in housing construction, mining procedures, and building railroads. In the early days, harvesting of forests were unregulated and within the first 20 years after the gold rush, a third of the timber in the Sierra Nevada was logged. Concern for the forests rose and created a movement towards conservation at the turn of the 20th century, leading to the creation of state and national parks (Yosemite, Sequoia, and General Grant Grove) and forest reserves, bringing forest land under regulation. Between 1900 and 1940, agencies like the U.S. Forest Service and National Park Service regulated the use of the Sierra Nevada's resources. The economy boom after World War II dramatically increased timber production in the Sierras using clear-cutting as the dominant form of logging. In addition, the California Forest Practice Act, or the Z'Berg-Nejedly Forest Practice Act was enacted in 1973 to regulate private timberland holdings.

== Methods ==
Logging on privately owned and state-managed timberland in California is restricted to silvicultural techniques defined within by the California Forest Practice Rules. These including: single tree selection, seed tree, shelterwood, group selection, variable retention, and clear-cutting management techniques.

- clear-cutting involves removal of all trees from a tract of land within a 20-acre area followed by replanting if the new ingrowth of seedlings does not meet stocking levels outlined by the Forest Practice Rules. This can result in disturbances in the Sierra Nevada environment by creating patches of densely packed, single-species, same-aged, tree plantations.
- Single Tree Selection involves removal of individual trees in a prescribed fashion. Usually this is done across the size distribution of trees in a stand and mimics to some degree the natural mortality pattern and rate within a stand.

Low-impact logging meets current needs without compromising the ability of future generations to meet their needs. This typically means smaller periodic harvests and removing the worst trees to eliminate danger to high value trees. Forest management, concerning harvest rate, reforestation, erosion control, and stream protection, is key to limiting environmental degradation from timber harvesting and to protect future resources.

Logging on federal timberland in California follow national regulations, and until 1990 the USFS was practicing clear-cut logging on public lands. Recently, the USFS in California has been utilizing the GTR-220 protocols that encourage more thinning or selection logging on its public lands.

== Logging industry ==
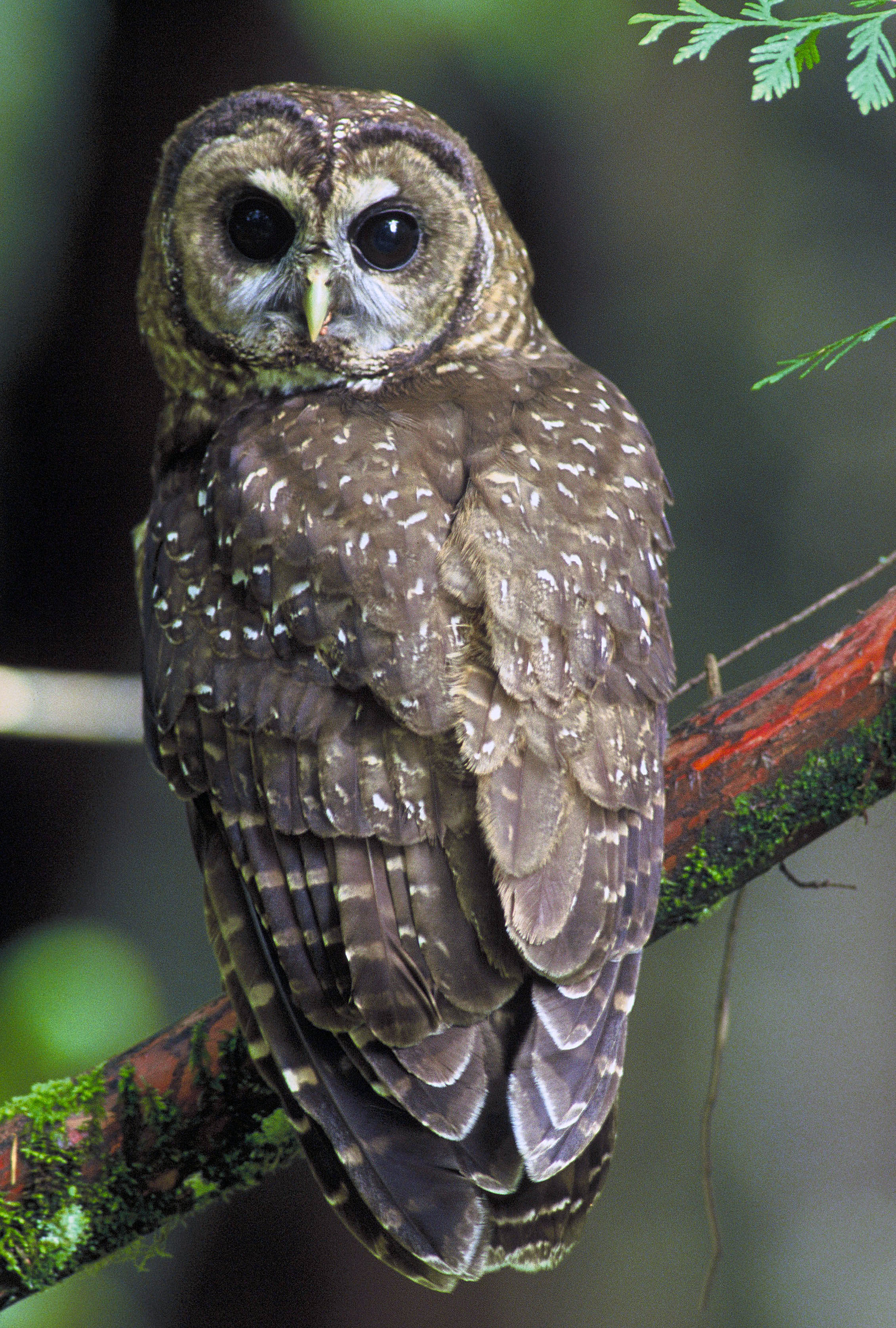
Northern spotted owl

Although very significant in certain local economies, the overall economic impact of the forest industry in California in the 21st century is fairly modest. California forests produce about 350 million board feet of wood products annually. These products include $100 million in market value for saw timber and $40 million in market value electricity produced from biomass. Logging creates jobs for about 2,000 private sector workers. For comparison, thirty-three million people visit the National Forests of California for recreation, generating 38,000 outdoor recreation-related jobs.

The US Forest Service administers 20 million acres or approximately one-fifth of California's landscape. Sierra Pacific Industries, based in Redding, California, owns and manages roughly 1.4 million acres (5,700 km^{2}) of forestland in California, making it the largest private forest owner in the state.

== Environmental concerns ==
Logging practices have altered a large portion of native forests, transforming them into simplified forests of same-aged trees with a reduced ecological resilience. These disturbed stands are especially prone to wildfire and mortality due to beetle infestation and disease. It has also caused fragmentation and increased edge effect, along with releasing pesticides and chemicals into the water and land. Conservation groups are concerned about the loss of large, old growth trees that provide unique habitat for wildlife, and the cumulative impact of large private landowners using harmful logging practices across huge tracts of land in the Sierra Nevada.

Regulation mandates protective measures to address the risk effecting a wide variety of biotic and abiotic factors. The California spotted owl, a North American endangered species, may depend on large tracts of old-growth coniferous forests and its protection has been a major wildlife and forest management issue.

== See also ==
- History of the lumber industry in the United States
- Hume-Bennett Lumber Company
- Madera Sugar Pine Company
- Sugar Pine Lumber Company
- Yosemite Lumber Company
