= Old Webster Schoolhouse =

- Webster Schoolhouse, Old
- U.S. National Register of Historic Places
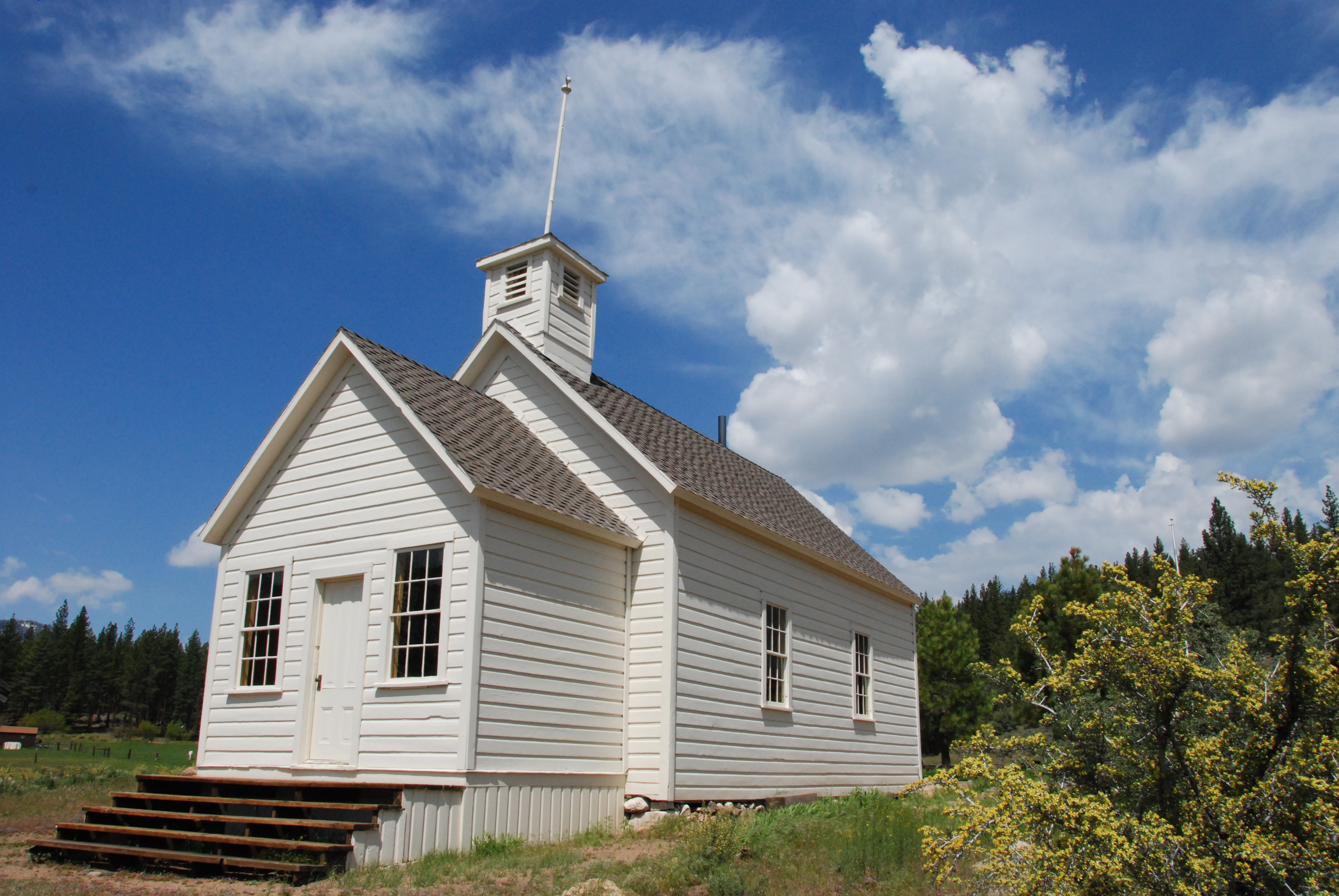

- Location within California Location within the United States
- Location: 135 School St., Markleeville, California
- Coordinates: 38°41′40″N 119°46′56″W
- NRHP reference No.: 05000071
- Added to NRHP: July 11, 2005

Old Webster Schoolhouse, also known as Markleeville Schoolhouse, is a historic one-room schoolhouse located at 135 School St., Markleeville, in Alpine County, California. It was listed on the National Register of Historic Places in 2005. The building was initially used as a meeting room and schoolhouse before being renovated into a museum.

== History ==
The area the schoolhouse sits on was historically inhabited by the Washoe Tribe. The land may have been used as a campsite, as there are several rocks near the schoolhouse with holes in them which were used to grind corn and acorns.

The schoolhouse served as the only school in Alpine County for many years. The exact date the schoolhouse was built is unknown, but it was likely in the late 1800s. By 1927 the schoolhouse was abandoned.

In 1963, the schoolhouse faced risk of demolition as the Alpine County Unified School District wanted to develop the land to raise funds. In 1966, funding was raised by the Alpine County Historical Society to renovate the schoolhouse into a museum. The project cost about $3,500 at the time.

The building is now part of the Alpine County Museum, a complex which includes the restored one-room schoolhouse, the museum, a log jail and a silver ore stamp mill. The museum is operated by the Alpine County Historical Society and is open seasonally.
