= Sacramento Valley Museum =

Coordinates: 39°09′08″N 122°09′42″W

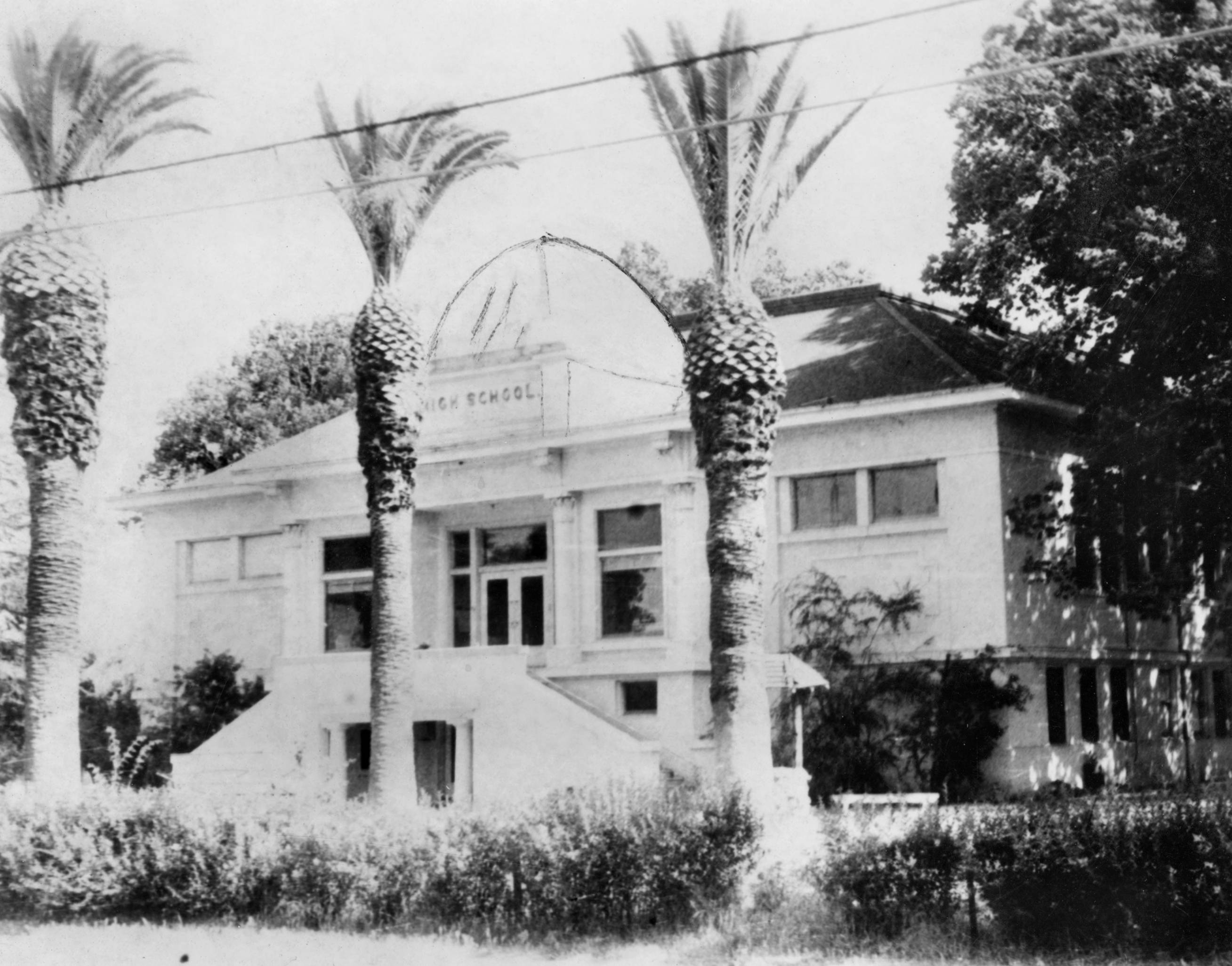
- Sacramento Valley Museum when it was still the Williams High School
- Established: 1963
- Location: 1491 E St, Williams, California 95987
- Type: History museum
- Collection size: 19th to 20th century exhibits
- Director: Elijah Rodriguez
- President: Arno Martini
- Curator: Elijah Rodriguez
- Website: http://www.sacvalleymuseum.org

The Sacramento Valley Museum is located at 1491 E Street Williams, in Williams, Colusa County, northern California in the heart of the Sacramento Valley. Sacramento Valley history is promoted through displays of historical photographs, artifacts, textiles and quilts, manuscripts and documents, and vintage newspapers from the Sacramento Valley region in the northern California Central Valley.

== History of the Museum ==
The building that houses the Sacramento Valley Museum was built in 1911 to serve as Williams Union High School. The school graduated classes until 1956, when a new high school was built. Some alumni include jazz musician Turk Murphy, of San Francisco nightclub Earthquake McGoon's; Kenneth Zumwalt, editor of the Stars and Stripes during WWII; and the Fouch family of pharmacists, who served the Williams community for over 100 years.

The old building sat dormant for six years until Sacramento Valley residents took up its cause.

On August 15, 1962, architect Alvin Fingado visited the Williams High School building to ascertain its condition and determine what work would be needed to put the building in good condition. Fingado concluded that, among other things, the roof and skylight needed replacement and repair and the electrical wiring, the heating plant, and the plumbing system were in need of attention. He estimated that in total the work would cost between $20,000 and $25,000 to put the building in good condition; however, it would cost considerably less with volunteer labor and donations. In February 1964, Lulu Salter, president of the Sacramento Valley Museum Association, stated, “Our building has tremendous possibilities . . . all we need is manpower and money.”

The museum opened before repairs to the building were complete. In February 1963, The Williams Farmer reported, "It is very seldom, in these modern days, that an organization can muster men, women, and children in a large body to perform voluntary projects." From 1962 to 1964, groups of volunteers worked hard to repair the building and put together exhibits. The group of citizens who made up the first board of the Sacramento Valley Museum Association, in an effort to encourage interest in the developing museum, opened for viewing in March 1963, less than a year after architect Alvin Fingado stated the long-term repairs necessary to make the building inhabitable. The Museum was open for six months and then closed for repairs that were more extensive. The Museum officially opened in June 1964. In addition to exhibits of historic material, there were art exhibits and a room dedicated to art classes for the community.

== General information ==
The museum is open from March through October, Thursday - Saturday (10 a.m. - 4 p.m.). It is closed November through February. Admission is free except for group or appointment visits.

The SVM is a non-profit organization that runs primarily on the monetary gifts made from families, individuals, and corporations. Monetary donations to the SVM are used for general operating procedures, archival preservation, creation and maintenance and exhibits, and special events.
