= Williams, California =

City in California, United States

- City
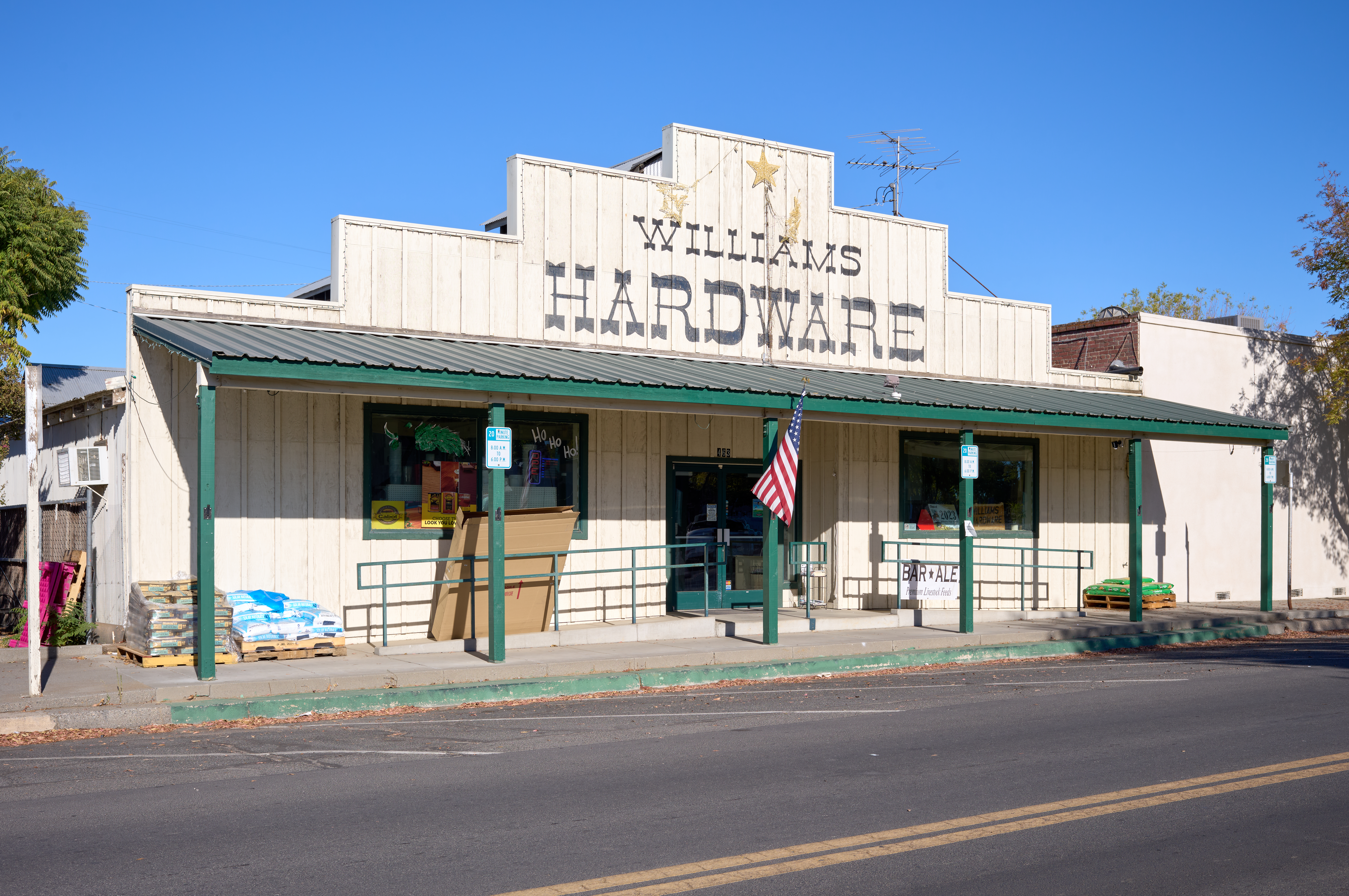
- Williams Hardware on 7th Street
- Interactive map of Williams, California
- Location within California Location within the United States
- Coordinates: 39°09′17″N 122°08′58″W
- Country: United States
- State: California
- County: Colusa
- Incorporated: May 17, 1920

Government
  - Mayor: Maria Belmontes-Leyva
  - City Administrator: Frank Kennedy

Area
  - Total: 4.95 sq mi (12.81 km^{2})
  - Land: 4.95 sq mi (12.81 km^{2})
  - Water: 0 sq mi (0.00 km^{2}) 0%
- Elevation: 82 ft (25 m)

Population (2020)
  - Total: 5,538
  - Density: 1,120/sq mi (432.4/km^{2})
- Time zone: UTC-08:00 (PST)
  - Summer (DST): UTC-07:00 (PDT)
- ZIP code: 95987
- Area codes: 530, 837
- FIPS code: 06-85586
- GNIS feature IDs: 1652653, 2412268
- Website: www.cityofwilliams.org

Williams (formerly Central) is a city in Colusa County, California, United States. The population was 5,538 at the 2020 census, up from 5,123 at the 2010 census.

== Geography ==
According to the United States Census Bureau, the city has a total area of 4.9 square miles (13 km^{2}), all land.

== History ==
The postal service established a post office at Central in 1874. The town and post office were renamed in 1876, in honor of W. H. Williams, who platted the townsite. The city of Williams was incorporated in 1920.

== Demographics ==
Historical population
Census	Pop.	Note	%±
1880	279		—
1890	461		65.2%
1930	851		—
1940	814		−4.3%
1950	1,134		39.3%
1960	1,370		20.8%
1970	1,571		14.7%
1980	1,655		5.3%
1990	2,297		38.8%
2000	3,670		59.8%
2010	5,123		39.6%
2020	5,538		8.1%
U.S. Decennial Census

=== 2020 census ===
As of the 2020 census, Williams had a population of 5,538. The population density was 1,017.3 inhabitants per square mile (392.8/km^{2}). The census reported that 98.7% of the population lived in households and 1.3% were institutionalized. 98.8% of residents lived in urban areas, while 1.2% lived in rural areas.

The age distribution was 31.7% under the age of 18, 10.4% aged 18 to 24, 26.6% aged 25 to 44, 20.3% aged 45 to 64, and 11.0% who were 65 years of age or older. The median age was 30.6 years. For every 100 females there were 97.1 males, and for every 100 females age 18 and over there were 95.2 males age 18 and over.

There were 1,572 households in Williams, of which 56.6% had children under the age of 18 living in them. Of all households, 57.7% were married-couple households, 6.2% were cohabiting couple households, 13.3% were households with a male householder and no spouse or partner present, and 22.8% were households with a female householder and no spouse or partner present. About 14.6% of all households were made up of individuals and 8.2% had someone living alone who was 65 years of age or older. The average household size was 3.48. There were 1,277 families (81.2% of all households).

There were 1,751 housing units at an average density of 321.6 units per square mile (124.2 units/km^{2}), of which 1,572 (89.8%) were occupied. Of occupied units, 59.4% were owner-occupied and 40.6% were occupied by renters. Of all housing units, 10.2% were vacant. The homeowner vacancy rate was 1.8%, and the rental vacancy rate was 1.4%.

Racial composition as of the 2020 census
Race	Number	Percent
White	1,509	27.2%
Black or African American	52	0.9%
American Indian and Alaska Native	93	1.7%
Asian	97	1.8%
Native Hawaiian and Other Pacific Islander	17	0.3%
Some other race	2,494	45.0%
Two or more races	1,276	23.0%
Hispanic or Latino (of any race)	4,467	80.7%

=== Income and poverty ===
In 2023, the US Census Bureau estimated that the median household income was $93,138, and the per capita income was $29,466. About 5.5% of families and 5.9% of the population were below the poverty line.

=== 2010 census ===
At the 2010 census Williams had a population of 5,123. The population density was 941.0 inhabitants per square mile (363.3/km^{2}). The racial makeup of Williams was 2,785 (54.4%) White, 59 (1.2%) African American, 55 (1.1%) Native American, 94 (1.8%) Asian, 4 (0.1%) Pacific Islander, 1,946 (38.0%) from other races, and 180 (3.5%) from two or more races. Hispanic or Latino of any race were 3,891 persons (76.0%).

The census reported that 5,014 people (97.9% of the population) lived in households, 23 (0.4%) lived in non-institutionalized group quarters, and 86 (1.7%) were institutionalized.

There were 1,369 households, 782 (57.1%) had children under the age of 18 living in them, 892 (65.2%) were opposite-sex married couples living together, 140 (10.2%) had a female householder with no husband present, 98 (7.2%) had a male householder with no wife present. There were 73 (5.3%) unmarried opposite-sex partnerships, and 7 (0.5%) same-sex married couples or partnerships. 185 households (13.5%) were one person and 73 (5.3%) had someone living alone who was 65 or older. The average household size was 3.66. There were 1,130 families (82.5% of households); the average family size was 4.04.

The age distribution was 1,701 people (33.2%) under the age of 18, 588 people (11.5%) aged 18 to 24, 1,442 people (28.1%) aged 25 to 44, 965 people (18.8%) aged 45 to 64, and 427 people (8.3%) who were 65 or older. The median age was 28.3 years. For every 100 females, there were 108.7 males. For every 100 females age 18 and over, there were 106.9 males.

There were 1,487 housing units at an average density of 273.1 units per square mile (105.4 units/km^{2}), of which 1,369 were occupied, 832 (60.8%) by the owners and 537 (39.2%) by renters. The homeowner vacancy rate was 3.8%; the rental vacancy rate was 4.4%. 3,011 people (58.8% of the population) lived in owner-occupied housing units and 2,003 people (39.1%) lived in rental housing units.

== Government and politics ==
In the state legislature, Williams is in the 1st senatorial district, represented by Republican Megan Dahle, and the 4th Assembly district, represented by Democrat Cecilia Aguiar-Curry. Federally, Williams is in California's 1st congressional district, represented by Republican James Gallagher.

The current mayor of Williams, as of 2025, is Maria Belmontes-Leyva and the current city administrator is Frank Kennedy.

California's longest-serving governor, Jerry Brown, retired to a home that he built on his family's ancestral Schuckman Ranch, in the foothills west of Williams.

== Climate ==
Williams has a hot-summer Mediterranean climate (Csa) according to the Köppen climate classification system.

Climate data for Williams (1906–2012)
Month	Jan	Feb	Mar	Apr	May	Jun	Jul	Aug	Sep	Oct	Nov	Dec	Year
Record high °F (°C)	83 (28)	83 (28)	88 (31)	97 (36)	102 (39)	112 (44)	113 (45)	115 (46)	109 (43)	100 (38)	91 (33)	76 (24)	115 (46)
Mean daily maximum °F (°C)	54.5 (12.5)	60.8 (16.0)	65.8 (18.8)	73.2 (22.9)	82.1 (27.8)	91.2 (32.9)	96.6 (35.9)	94.6 (34.8)	89.1 (31.7)	79.2 (26.2)	64.6 (18.1)	55.4 (13.0)	75.6 (24.2)
Mean daily minimum °F (°C)	36.1 (2.3)	39 (4)	41.3 (5.2)	44.8 (7.1)	52 (11)	58.3 (14.6)	60.4 (15.8)	58.4 (14.7)	54.8 (12.7)	48.3 (9.1)	40.6 (4.8)	36.5 (2.5)	47.5 (8.6)
Record low °F (°C)	22 (−6)	25 (−4)	27 (−3)	31 (−1)	35 (2)	45 (7)	45 (7)	46 (8)	39 (4)	33 (1)	23 (−5)	21 (−6)	21 (−6)
Average precipitation inches (mm)	3.25 (83)	2.7 (69)	1.95 (50)	0.98 (25)	0.35 (8.9)	0.22 (5.6)	0.03 (0.76)	0.07 (1.8)	0.37 (9.4)	0.75 (19)	2.14 (54)	2.8 (71)	15.62 (397)
Average snowfall inches (cm)	0.7 (1.8)	0 (0)	0 (0)	0 (0)	0 (0)	0 (0)	0 (0)	0 (0)	0 (0)	0 (0)	0 (0)	0 (0)	0.7 (1.8)
Average precipitation days	8	7	7	4	2	1	0	0	1	3	6	8	47
Source: WRCC

== Education ==
Williams is served by the Williams Unified School District.

== See also ==
- Sacramento Valley Museum
- Wilbur Hot Springs
