= Dorothy Stanley =

American educator and activist (1924–1990)

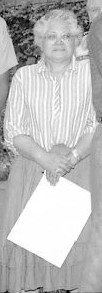
- Stanley receiving National Park Service special achievement award in 1985

Chair of the Tuolumne Me-Wuk Tribal Council
- In office 1980–?

Personal details
- Born: Dorothy Amora Dudley; July 14, 1924 Los Angeles, California, U.S.
- Died: October 10, 1990 (aged 66) Tuolumne Rancheria, California, U.S.
- Occupation: Academic; consultant; activist; politician

Dorothy Amora Stanley (née Dudley; July 14, 1924 – October 10, 1990) was an American educator, consultant, Miwok activist, and politician. Trained in Northern Miwok culture during her youth, she became involved in Native American affairs – particularly the Tuolumne Band of Me-Wuk Indians – after her fourth marriage. An advocate for Native American interests, she served as vice-chair of the Bureau of Indian Affairs Central California Agency's advisory board and as chair of the Tuolumne Me-Wuk Tribal Council in 1980. She was also an educator and demonstrator on Miwok culture, including basket-weaving, as well as an archaeological and academic consultant.

== Biography ==
=== Early life and career ===
Dorothy Amora Stanley was born on July 14, 1924, in Los Angeles, California, raised on the ancestral Fuller Ranch and Tuolumne Rancheria (both in Tuolumne County), and educated at the Stewart Indian School. Her parents were Raymond Dudley and Alice Carsoner Pruitt, the latter of whom was born to the northern Miwok chieftaincy, with her stepfather being the son of Chief William Fuller, and she was raised at home in the Northern Sierra Miwok and Central Sierra Miwok languages. In addition to several odd jobs outside the county such as candy maker, cashier, strawberry picker, and waitress, she had a long career working at the Pacific Telephone and Telegraph Company as an operator and supervisor.

=== Career with the Tuolumne Band of Me-Wuk Indians ===
Originally trained by William Fuller's wife Annie Jack Fuller in Northern Miwok culture during her youth, she started her career with the interests of the Tuolumne Band of Me-Wuk Indians after returning to Tuolumne County alongside her husband in 1970. She held several positions in Native American affairs, including as Heritage Conservation and Recreation Service liaison for the New Melones Dam, project director of the Tuolumne Indian Rural Health Project (which was also done at the Rancheria), and vice-chair of the Bureau of Indian Affairs Central California Agency's advisory board. She dedicated the United States Bicentennial plaque at the site of a Miwok camp the Bartleson–Bidwell Party witnessed in 1841, the first of its kind in the county. After serving in the Tuolumne Me-Wuk Tribal Council (TMTC)'s business committee, she was elected chair of the tribe in 1980, but she was suspended from office in June after the Rancheria fell into debt and ran into accounting and administrative irregularities concerning government grants they were awarded.

She was a supporter of Native American rights, with her co-worker Shelly Davis-King recalling that Stanley once said that her experience with bureaucratic complications was "not red tape, but white tape". She worked as an educator on Miwok culture, including at demonstrations at such places as the Smithsonian Folklife Festival and Southwest Museum of the American Indian, and she was a practitioner of Miwok basket-weaving. She supported the preservation of the Miwok languages, considering them essential to Miwok culture, and at one point was reportedly one of their last speakers. She also worked as an archaeological and academic consultant, including as supervisor of Yosemite National Park's Indian Cultural Program and an Indian village attraction at West Side and Cherry Valley Railroad, a canceled theme park in Tuolumne City originally planned by Taco Bell founder Glen Bell.

=== Personal life, death, and legacy ===
In addition to three previous husbands, she had seven children with her Southern Sierra Miwok husband Elmer Stanley, whom she married in 1969, including basket weaver Jennifer Bates.

Stanley died from heart complications on October 10, 1990, at the Rancheria. The Modesto Bee reported that she was known as "a symbol of MeWuk pride and MeWuk identity", with her son-in-law, ethnographer Craig Bates, calling her "a link with a people and a past". In Native American Women: A Biographical Dictionary, Bev Ortiz recalled that Stanley "made substantial contributions to the preservation and continuance of Miwok culture and worked extensively on behalf of her community".
