= Cherokee, Tuolumne County, California =

Historical place in Tuolumne County, United States

Cherokee, California
- 1907 mine

- Location within California Location within the United States
- 37.97983°N 120.248086°W
- Location: Just north of Tuolumne, California, on Tuolumne Road

History
- Built: 1853, 173 years ago

Site notes
- Architect: Cherokee Brother
- Architectural style: 49 Mining town

California Historical Landmark
- Designated: December 11, 1949
- Reference no.: 445

Cherokee, California is a historical mining town site in Tuolumne in Tuolumne County, California, United States. The site of Cherokee, California is a California Historical Landmark No. 410 listed on December 11, 1949. The Scott brothers, descendants of the Cherokee Tribe, discovered gold in 1853 in Tuolumne County. Soon many placer mines started in the valley of Cherokee and the town of Cherokee was founded. When the placer gold panning (diggins) ran out, some quartz mines opened around Cherokee. Cherokee was the first mining town in the East Best of the California Mother Lode. Cherokee supported the other nearby mining camp of Independence, Little Jessie, Mary Ellen, Plowboy and Excelsior. At its peak Cherokee had a population of 700 in 1856. After the gold ran out the Scanvino brothers, Domingo and Ciovanni, from Italy, started a family farm that replaced Cherokee. Cherokee is now a neighborhood of Tuolumne City. A marker at the site was place there by the California Centennials Commission on December 11, 1949 (marker now maybe missing or moved).

Main early mines in Cherokee were the Carlotta Mine, Carlotta placer, Central Mine, Chicken Feed placer, Columbus Mine, Cuno placer, Gibson Mine, Hidden Treasure Mine, Laura & North Star Mine, Pennsylvania Mine, Porto Fino Mine, Prudhomme Mine. Cordova Mine., Star placer and Washington placer.

== See also ==
- California Historical Landmarks in Tuolumne County
- Tuolumne Band of Me-Wuk Indians just to the east of Cherokee
