= Yosemite Railroad =

Yosemite Railroad may refer to:

- Yosemite Valley Railroad, a short-line railroad operating from 1907 to 1945 in the state of California, mostly following the Merced River from Merced to Yosemite National Park
- Yosemite Mountain Sugar Pine Railroad, a historic narrow gauge railroad with two operating steam train locomotives located near Fish Camp, California
