= Summerville Union High School =

Location
- 17555 Tuolumne Road; Tuolumne, California 95379; United States
- Coordinates: 37°57′41″N 120°15′19″W

Information
- School district: Summerville Union High School District
- Principal: Brett Christopher
- Teaching staff: 27.06 (FTE)
- Grades: 9-12
- Enrollment: 457 (2022-23)
- Student to teacher ratio: 16.89
- Color(s): Orange and Black
- Team name: Bears
- Website: www.summbears.net

Summerville Union High School is a high school in Tuolumne, California. It currently serves the surrounding mountain communities such as Cold Springs, Long Barn, Mi-Wuk Village, Pinecrest, Sierra Village, Strawberry, Sugar Pine, Tuolumne, and Twain Harte.

== About ==
The schedule consists of 'A' days and 'B' days, with 8 periods split between the two different days. A regular school day starts at 7:55 am and ends at 3:05 pm. On Thursday and Friday, days start at 7:55 am and end at 2:05 pm. There are many ways to be active with the school, from dressing up on a certain day to starting a fundraiser for a new class for the school.

== History ==
Summerville Union High School was first named Summersville, but when it was named in 1911, it lost the second 's'.

The first graduating class was in 1911. In October 2015, four students were arrested for plotting to shoot staff and students at an upcoming event. (2021-2022 wrestling placed first in the divisions tournament.)
