= W. R. Pickering =

19th century American business tycoon

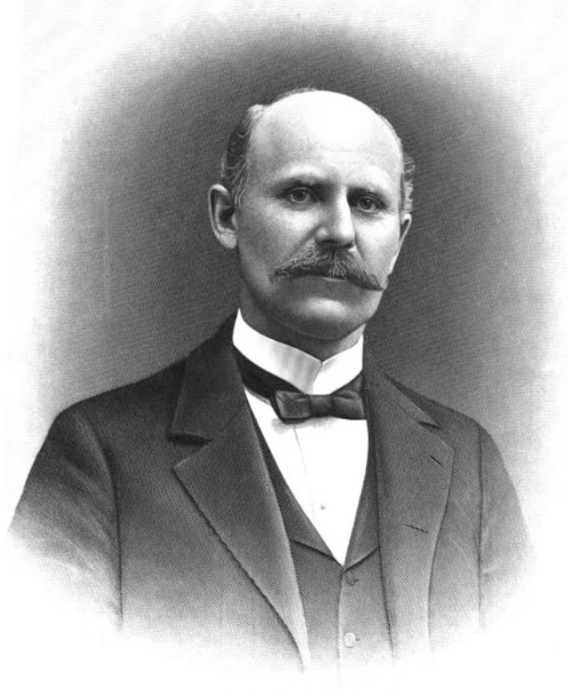
- Born: William Russell Pickering; December 31, 1849; St. Louis County, Missouri, United States
- Died: April 1, 1927 (aged 77); Kansas City, Missouri, United States
- Burial place: Forest Hill Cemetery
- Occupation: Lumber baron
- Known for: W. R. Pickering Lumber Company, Pickering Land and Timber Company, and establishing Pickering, Louisiana
- Spouse: Jane Coggburn (m. 1870)

William Russell Pickering (1849–1927), referred to as W. R. Pickering, was an American miner, lumber baron, developer, railroad owner and banker. From his first business adventure in mining lead, in Joplin, Missouri in 1872, and his partnership with Ellis Short in the merchandise business at Joplin, the empire grew across several states, including Missouri, Arkansas, Indian Territory, Louisiana, Texas, and California.

== Early life ==
Pickering was born on December 31, 1849, in St. Louis County, Missouri but when he was ten the family moved to Waynesville, Missouri where he grew up. In 1872, he ventured into mining lead. In 1880 Pickering entered a partnership with Ellis Short in the merchandising business and expanded into northern Arkansas. They purchased a tract of land in Stanley, Oklahoma and entered into the lumber business.

== Lumber businesses ==
In 1894 the W. R. Pickering Lumber Company was established with yards in at Springfield, Lebanon, Deepwater Ozark and Pierce City, Missouri, as well as Fayetteville and Van Buren, Arkansas. The W. R. Pickering Lumber Company was incorporated in 1899, for a period of 25 years, with W. R. as president, W. A. Pickering, as vice president and manager, T. M. Barham as secretary, and R. E. Browne as general sales agent. 30,000 acres of virgin longleaf yellow pine was purchased and a modern sawmill erected in Vernon Parish, Louisiana, producing 200,000 board feet of lumber a day. The sawmill was located on the Kansas City, Pittsburg & Gulf Railroad, that is now the Kansas City Southern, and the village was named Pickering. By 1904 the Louisiana Central Railroad had 75 miles of lines and 12 engines running at Neame, Hornbeck, Barham, Pickering, and Cravens. In 1905 the Pickering Land and Timber Company was incorporated. Additional tracts of land were added and a second sawmill erected. The sawmill town was named Barham in honor of the secretary T. M. Barham. In 1905 41,000-acres of Wright-Blodgett Lumber Company (from Illinois) land was acquired 20 miles southeast of Pickering, on the Atchison, Topeka & Santa Fe Railway, and a third mill erected, with the village being named Cravens.

The Sabine Valley Timber and Lumber Company was incorporated in 1909 for a period of 25 years operating mainly in Shelby County, Sabine County, and San Augustine County, Texas. Other businesses were located in Modoc County and Siskiyou County,

The Pickering Lumber Company purchased the West Side Lumber Company and railway in 1925.

=== Other interests ===
Pickering founded a bank at Marionville, Missouri (1893-1897), and had a large amount of stock in the Bank of Springfield.

=== Business associates ===
Thomas M. Barham, joined the W. R. Pickering Lumber Company as secretary on February 1, 1897. He had been a clerk in a grocery store, a salesman at a hardware store, a bank teller, a dry goods store worker, bank teller, the treasurer of the lumber company as well as secretary of the Louisiana Central Railroad Company and the Pickering Land & Timber Company. The town of Barham, Louisiana was named in his honor.

== Personal life ==
W. R. Pickering married Jane Coggburn in 1870. He was a Republican and a member of the Reorganized Church of Jesus Christ of Latter Day Saints.

He died at his home in Kansas City on April 1, 1927, and was buried at Forest Hill Cemetery.
