= West Side Lumber Company railway =

Narrow-gauge logging railroad (1898–1962)

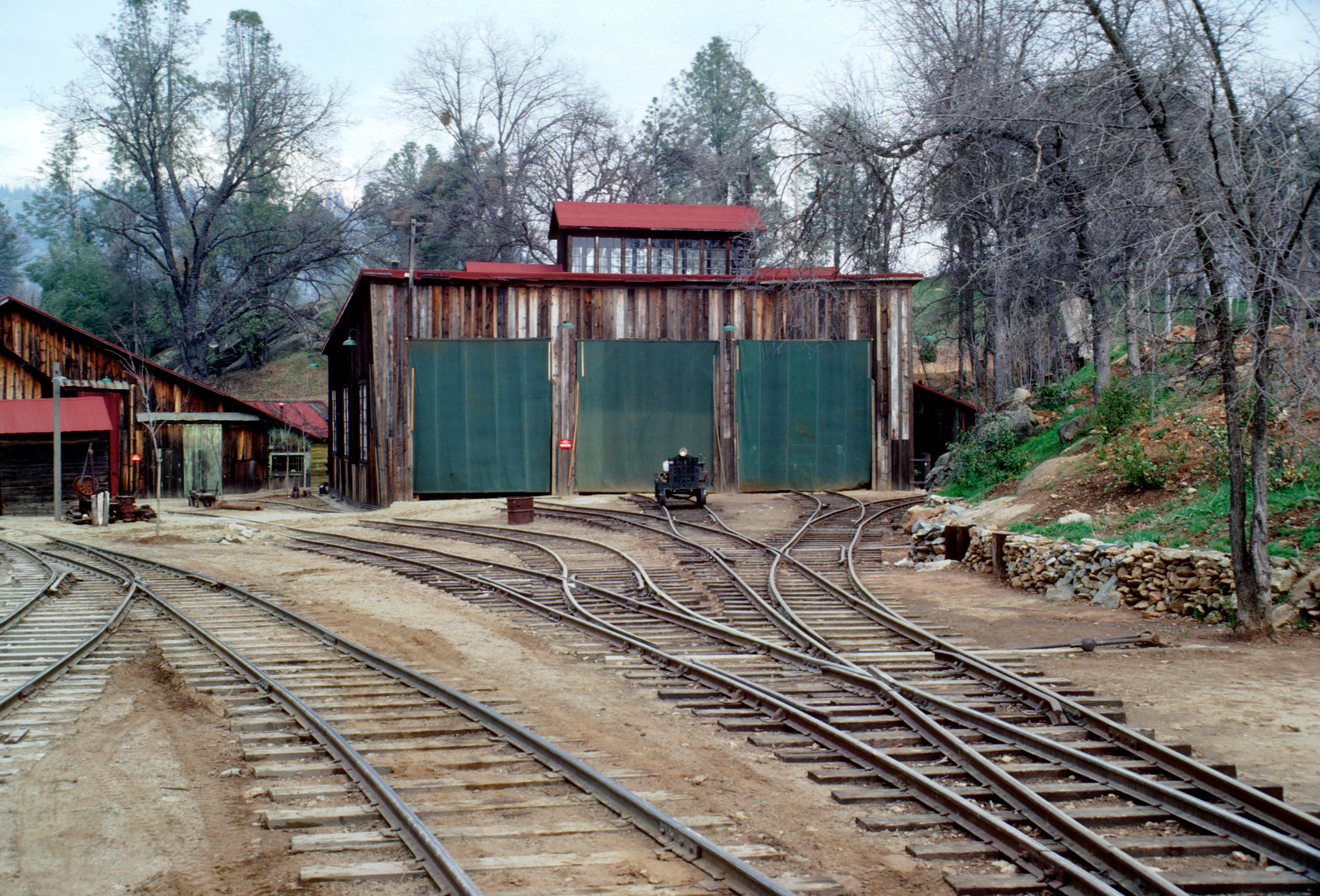
- The engine shed in 1979.

Overview
- Headquarters: Tuolumne
- Locale: California
- Dates of operation: 1898–1962
- Successor: Westside & Cherry Valley Railroad

Technical
- Track gauge: 3 ft (914 mm)
- Length: 70 miles (110 km)

The West Side Lumber Company railway was the last of the 3 ft (914 mm) narrow-gauge logging railroads operating in the American west.

== History ==
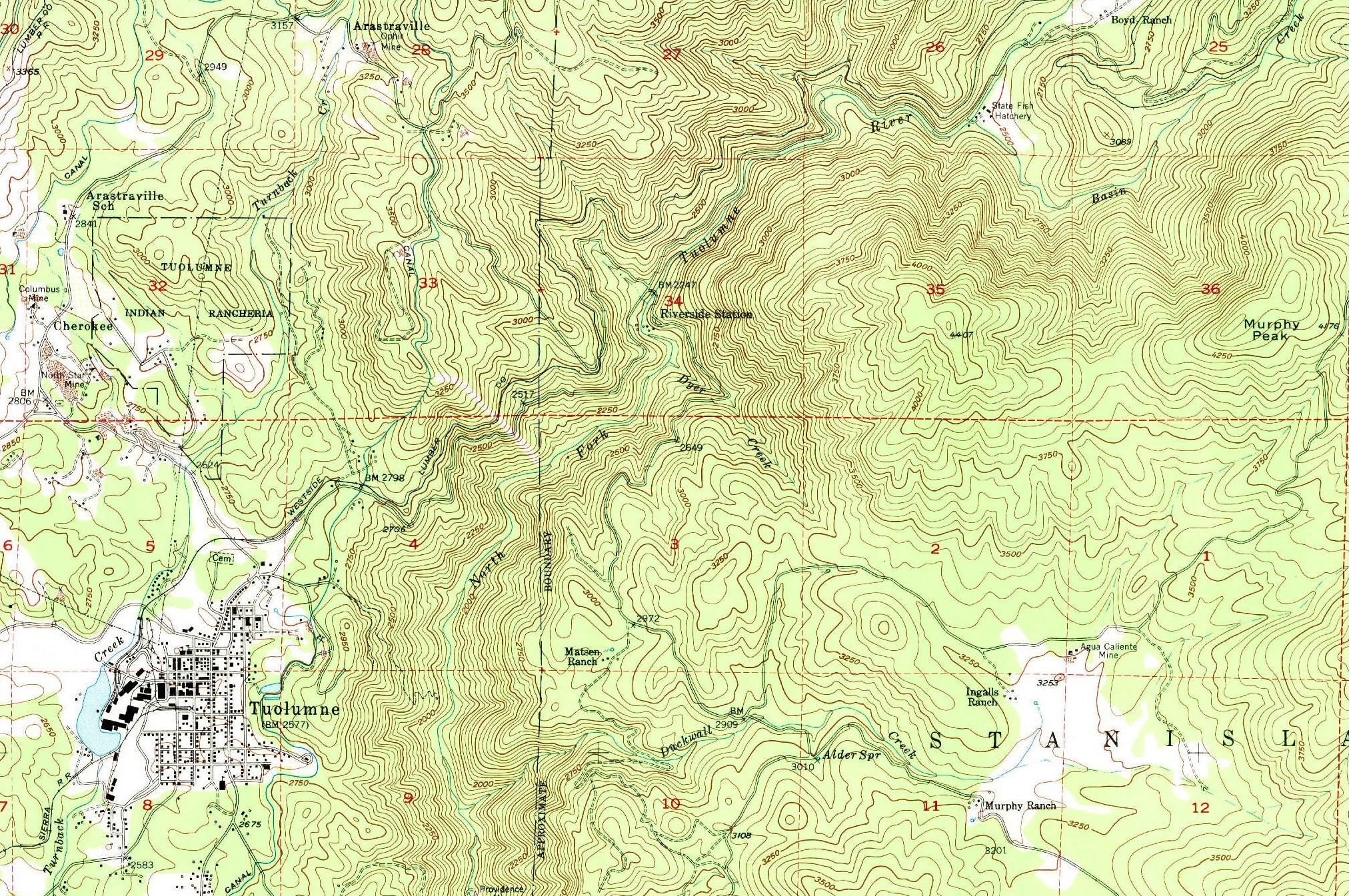
Route in 1948

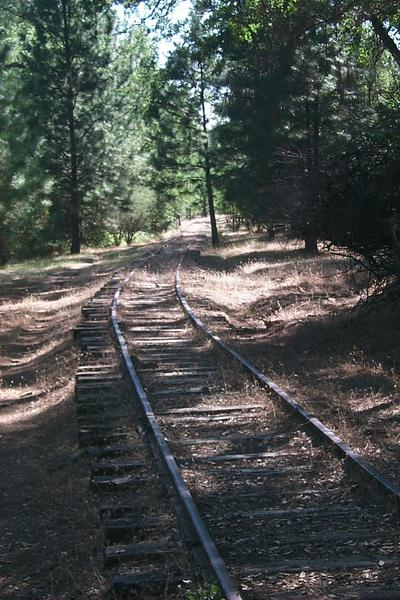
The lower section of the Railway in 2003

=== West Side Flume & Lumber Company ===
The West Side Flume & Lumber Company was founded in May 1898 to log 55,000 acres (22,000 ha) of land outside of the town of Carter (now called Tuolumne). A 10-mile (16 km) long 3 ft (914 mm) gauge railroad was laid into the woods east of the town.

=== Hetch Hetchy and Yosemite Valley Railroad ===
In 1900, the lumber company incorporated their railroad as a common carrier called the Hetch Hetchy and Yosemite Valley Railroad. Although it never reached either Hetch Hetchy or Yosemite valley, the company hoped to attract tourist traffic.

=== West Side Lumber Railroad ===
In 1925, the Pickering Lumber Company purchased the West Side Lumber Company.

=== Westside and Cherry Valley Railroad ===
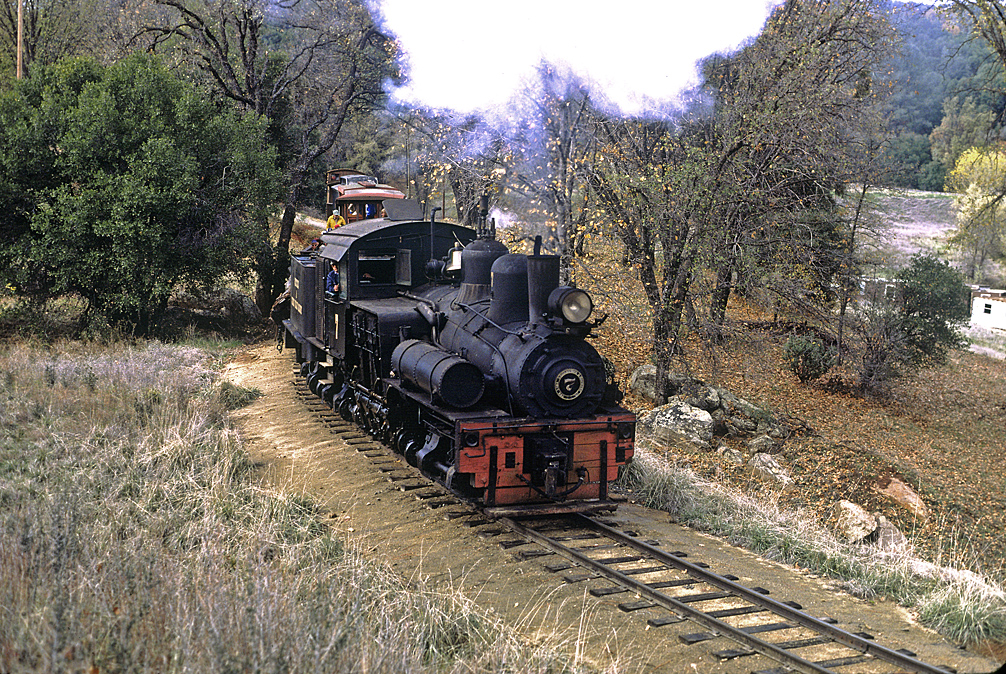
West Side and Cherry Valley Railroad No. 7

In 1968, Frank Cottle leased the lower end of the railroad from Pickering Lumber and opened the Westside and Cherry Valley Railroad as a tourist attraction. He restored locomotives #12 and #15 to run trains on tracks laid on the old mill site. In 1970, the Pickering Lumber company took over the operation from Cottle and extended the line by 8 miles to River Bridge.

In 1972, Fiberboard Corporation (which owned Pickering Lumber Company) transferred the railroad to another subsidiary, Trimont Land Company, with the rationale that the property might be suitable as a real estate development. The plan to carve up the property did not come to fruition, and in 1976, the railroad was sold to Glen Bell, the founder of the Taco Bell restaurant chain, who invested over $10 million in the railroad. This 3 ft (914 mm) gauge railroad used the lower section of the track and several steam locomotives of the West Side Lumber Company railway. The operation also offered boat rides on the old mill pond and RV parking. The theme park/railroad did not attract the anticipated number of visitors, and in 1981, Bell sold the 340-acre property to Henley Management Company for less than $500,000 and the railroad was shut down. In 1986, Quality Resorts of America bought it from Henley, and converted the property into an RV park, with limited railroad service. It sold off much of the rolling stock to other railroads, such as the Yosemite Mountain Sugar Pine Railroad, the Roaring Camp & Big Trees Narrow Gauge Railroad and the Nevada County Narrow Gauge Railroad Museum. Today, the railroad is no longer in operation, but part of the right-of-way is a hiking trail.

== Locomotives ==
=== Narrow gauge ===
| Name | Number | Builder | Type | Date | Works number | Notes | Image |
|---|---|---|---|---|---|---|---|
| Fido | | H.K. Porter | 0-4-0ST | | | Sold to the Sierra and San Francisco Power Company's Schoettgen Pass railroad | |
| Star | | H.K. Porter | 0-4-0ST | | | ex-Ferries and Cliff House Railroad, San Francisco | |
| | 1 | Heisler | Two Truck | 1899 | 1028 | Sold to the Swayne Lumber Company; scrapped 1940 | |
| | 2 | Heisler | Two Truck | 1899 | 1040 | Placed in West Side Memorial Park, Tuolumne, Ca. in 1960 | |
| | 3 | Heisler | Two Truck | 1899 | 1041 | Converted to standard gauge in 1947. Converted back to 3 ft (914 mm) circa 1962. Now Roaring Camp & Big Trees Narrow Gauge Railroad No. 2 Tuolumne (operational) | |
| | 4 | Heisler | Two Truck | 1901 | 1049 | Scrapped 1950 | |
| | 5 | Lima | Two Truck Shay | 1902 | 730 | Scrapped 1950 | |
| | 6 | Lima | Two Truck Shay | 1903 | 817 | Scrapped 1942 | |
| | 7 | Lima | Three Truck Shay | 1911 | 2465 | ex-Butte and Plumas Railway #4; now running on the Roaring Camp & Big Trees Narrow Gauge Railroad, named Sonora. | Locomotive #7, running on the Roaring Camp & Big Trees Narrow Gauge Railroad |
| | 8 | Lima | Three Truck Shay | 1922 | 3176 | Now displayed at Granby, Colorado at the Moffat Road RR museum, static display. Oct 2021 | 1922 Shay locomotive, West Side Lumber Co. #8, on display in Cañon City, Colorado |
| | 9 | Lima | Three Truck Shay | 1923 | 3199 | Operable at Midwest Central Railroad, Mt. Pleasant, Iowa. Lettered for West Side Lumber Company. Trucked to Silver Plume, CO, arrived February 2, 2011. Colorado Historical Society will rebuild 9 to operate on Georgetown Loop Railroad - estimated completion 2012. The 12, a Baldwin 2-6-2, will go to Mt. Pleasant, Iowa, after #9 enters service on the Georgetown Loop RR. | 1923 Lima #9, now with the Midwest Central Railroad. |
| | 10 | Lima | Three Truck Shay | 1928 | 3315 | Now running on the Yosemite Mountain Sugar Pine Railroad. Reportedly the largest narrow-gauge Shay locomotive ever built. | |
| | 12 | Lima | Three Truck Shay | 1927 | 3302 | ex-Swayne Lumber Company railway #6. Now at the Yosemite Mountain Sugar Pine Railroad. | |
| | 14 | Lima | Three Truck Shay | 1916 | 2835 | ex-Sierra Nevada Wood and Lumber Company #10. Now at Roaring Camp & Big Trees Narrow Gauge Railroad, named Rosa. | |
| | 15 | Lima | Three Truck Shay | 1913 | 2645 | ex-Sierra Nevada Wood and Lumber Company #9. Operable at Yosemite Mountain Sugar Pine Railroad. | |

=== Standard gauge ===
| Name | Number | Builder | Type | Date | Works number | Notes |
|---|---|---|---|---|---|---|
| Old Betsie | | H.K. Porter | 0-6-0+T | 1886 | 770 | Built as a 2-6-0 for the Prescott and Arizona Central Railroad |
| | 1 | Heisler | Two Truck | 1899 | 1036 | ex-Sierra Railway #9 |
| | 3 | Heisler | Two Truck | 1901 | 1049 | converted from 3 ft (914 mm) gauge in 1947 (see above) |
| | 14 | Baldwin | 4-4-0 | 1882 | 5851 | ex-Sierra Railway #4 |

Various artifacts of the railroad and photographs are preserved at the Tuolumne City Memorial Museum in Tuolumne, CA. The museum also arranges annual field trips to West Side logging camps in the woods.

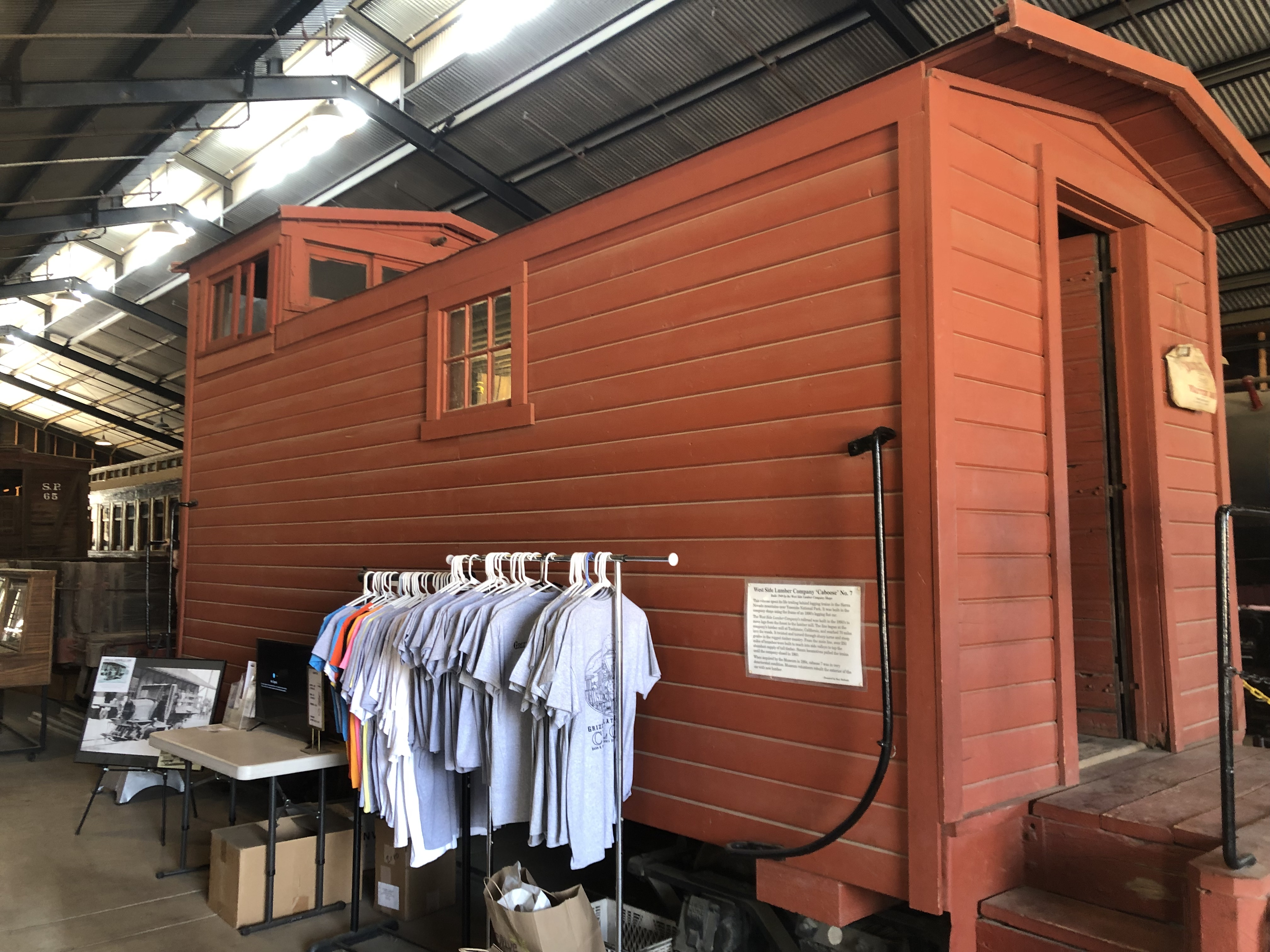
West Side Lumber Company caboose at the Southern California Railway Museum.

Several pieces of rolling stock from the West Side Lumber Company are preserved at the Nevada County Narrow Gauge Railroad & Transportation Museum, including two tank cars, two cabooses, a hopper car, flat car, block car and a parts car. The West Side had a very capable shop, that could make major engine repairs as well as build cars from scratch, including a caboose which is on display at the Southern California Railway Museum.
