= Tuolumne City Memorial Museum =

Coordinates: 37.9615°N 120.23587°W

The Tuolumne City Memorial Museum preserves the history of this mining and logging town on the western slope of the Sierra Nevada in California.

Exhibits trace the area's history going back to early Miwok Indian culture, early agricultural endeavors, gold mining, and the extensive logging operations of the West Side Lumber Company.

Tuolumne, which was originally known as Summerville, and later Carters, was the site of the West Side's large sawmill, which operated from 1899 until the 1960s, when it burned during a labor strike. The company also operated an extensive narrow-gauge railroad into the Sierra to bring logs to the mill. Standard-gauge tracks of the well-known Sierra Railroad came to Tuolumne to take finished lumber to market.

Some trestles and other remnants of the logging railroad still exist, and the museum organizes annual field trips into the woods to visit such sites.

The museum has a number of exhibits chronicling the lives of prominent citizens of the area, including a collection of family Bibles and historic cemetery records.
