= Yosemite Mountain Sugar Pine Railroad =

Heritage narrow-gauge railroad near Yosemite National Park

The Logger
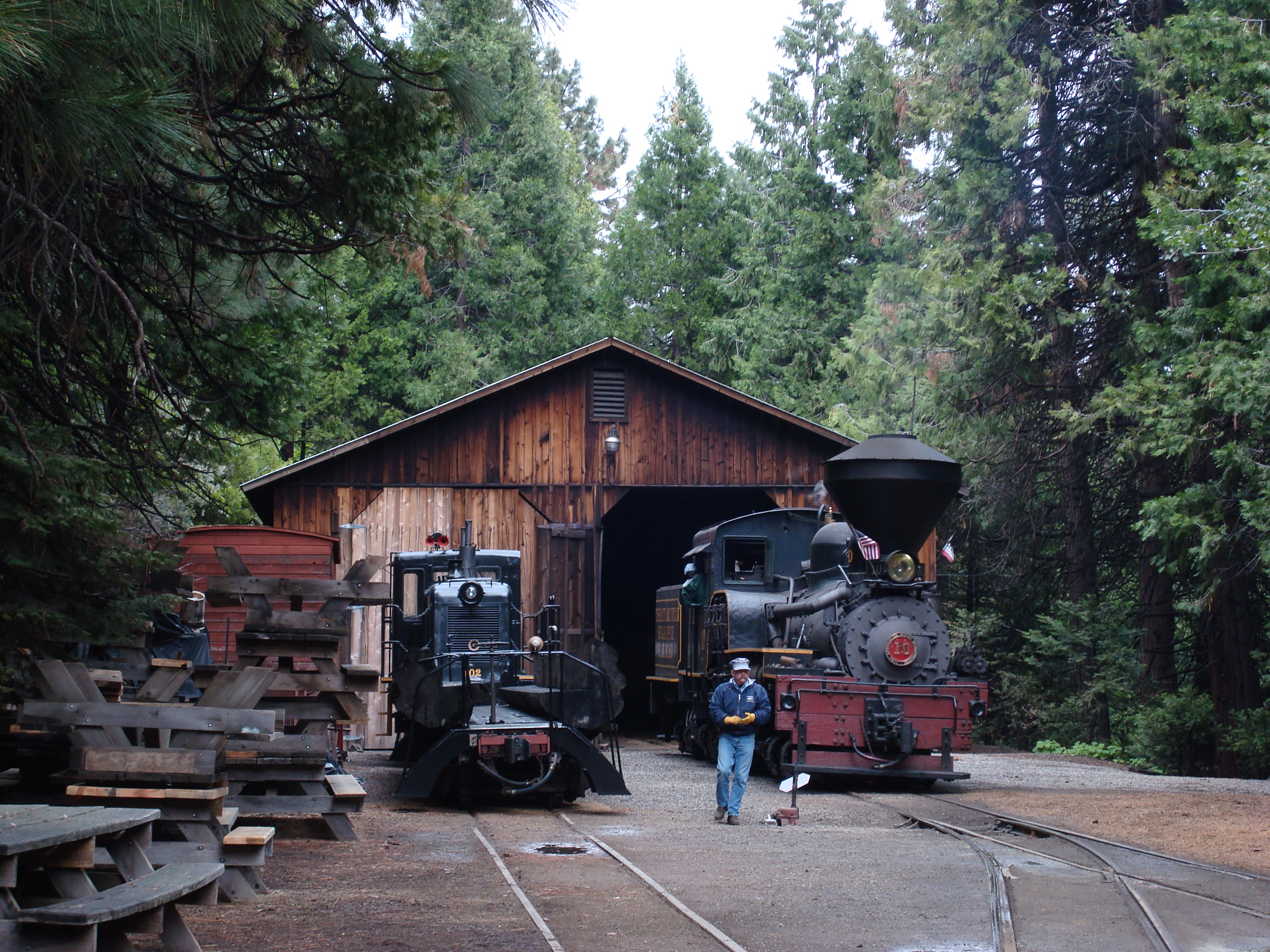
- Yosemite Mountain Sugar Pine Railroad's Shay No. 10 backing into the shops after a run on the line.
- Locale: Sierra National Forest, California
- Coordinates: 37°27′12″N 119°38′39″W

Commercial operations
- Built by: California Lumber Company
- Original gauge: 3 ft (914 mm)

Preserved operations
- Owned by: Stauffer family
- Reporting mark: YMSP
- Length: 4 mi (6.4 km)
- Preserved gauge: 3 ft (914 mm)

Commercial history
- Opened: 1874
- Closed: 1931

Preservation history
- 1961: Reopened
- Headquarters: 56001 State Route 41; Fish Camp, California

Website
- ymsprr.com

The Yosemite Mountain Sugar Pine Railroad (YMSPRR) is a heritage 3 ft (914 mm) narrow gauge railway near Fish Camp, California, in the Sierra National Forest near the southern entrance to Yosemite National Park. The railroad operates three steam locomotives. Rudy Stauffer founded the railroad in 1961 along part of the former route of the Madera Sugar Pine Lumber Company.

Operations began with the acquisition of three-truck Shay locomotive No. 10 from the West Side Lumber Company railway in Tuolumne, California. Built in 1928, No. 10 has been described as the largest narrow-gauge Shay locomotive built and was among the last constructed. In 1986, the railroad acquired Shay No. 15, another former West Side Lumber Company locomotive, from the West Side and Cherry Valley Railroad in Tuolumne. In 2026, the railroad acquired No. 12, originally built for the Swayne Lumber Company and later operated by the West Side Lumber Company, from the Colorado Railroad Museum.

The steam locomotives operate during the summer season, while the railroad's "Jenny" railcars are typically used during the off-season. Passengers ride in either open-air or covered passenger cars.

The railroad operates a 4-mile (6.4 km) round-trip excursion along the former Madera Sugar Pine logging grade through the Sierra National Forest. The railroad also operates seasonal dinner trains and events at the Lewis Creek Amphitheater. The depot site includes the Thornberry Museum, located in a relocated 19th-century log cabin, and a narrow-gauge snowplow.

== History ==
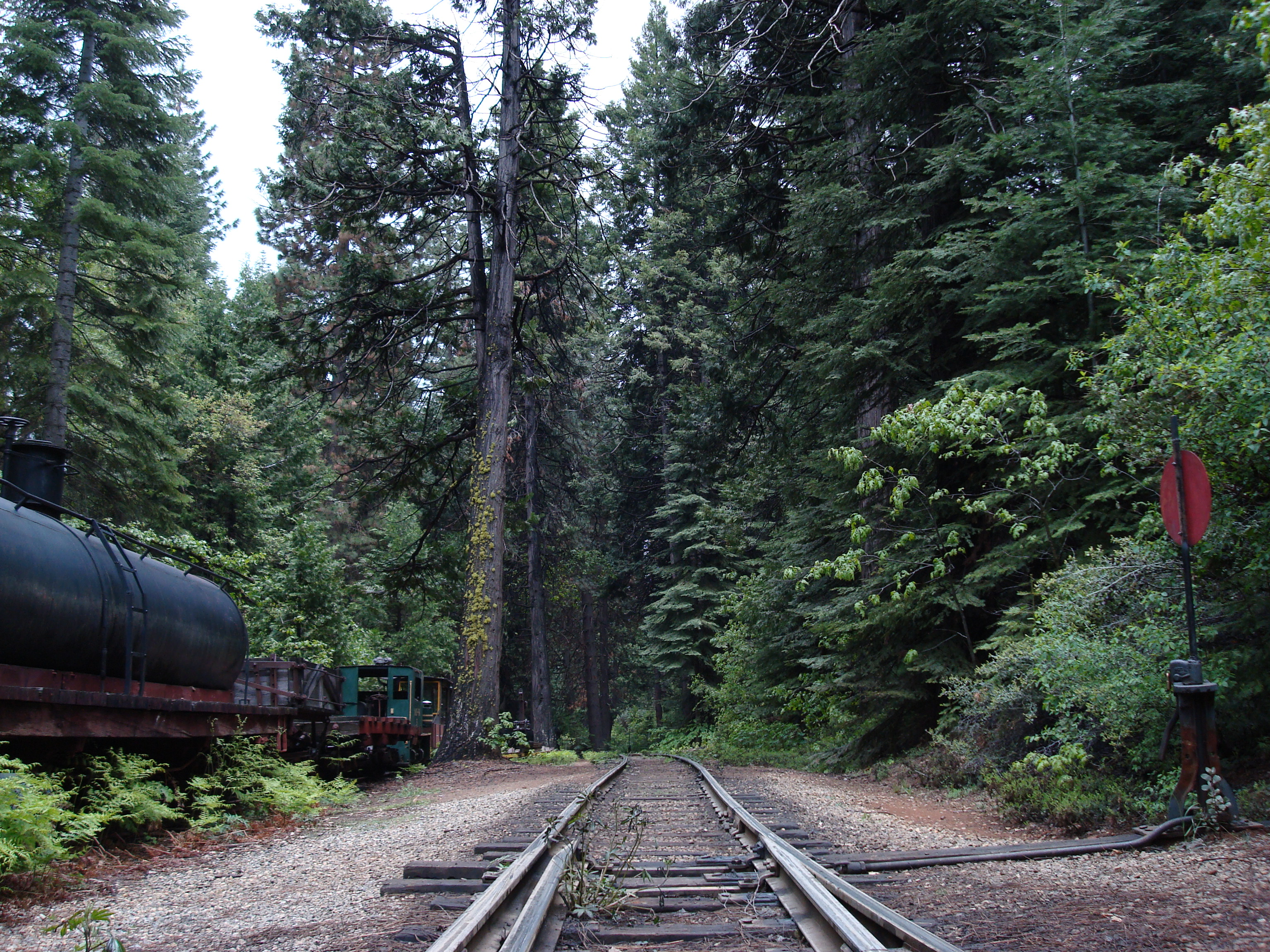
View of the railroad's track through the Sierra National Forest.

The current railroad follows part of a grade constructed by the Madera Sugar Pine Lumber Company in the early 20th century. The company originated in 1874 as the California Lumber Company, which logged timber in the area surrounding Oakhurst, California. The Madera Sugar Pine Lumber Company later operated a large sawmill at Sugar Pine, California, south of the present-day YMSPRR. Its logging railroad included seven locomotives, more than 100 log cars, and approximately 140 miles (230 km) of track in the surrounding Sierra Nevada. The company also operated a flume extending 54 miles (87 km) from Sugar Pine to Madera, California, which was used to transport rough-cut lumber to lower elevations for processing and shipment.

The company's logging operations relied heavily on clearcutting and no reforestation efforts were made. Remnants of the original old-growth forest, including large stumps, remain visible along portions of the route.

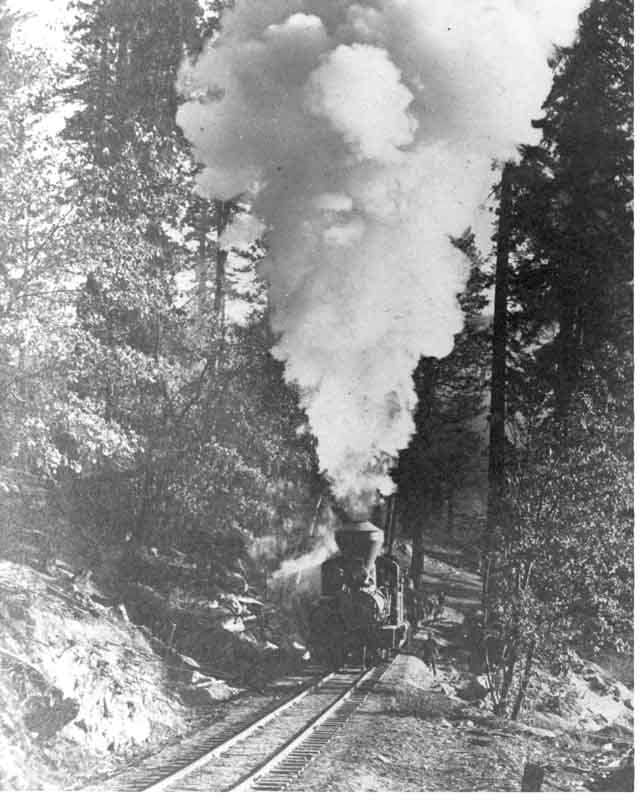
A Madera Sugar Pine Lumber Company log train near Sugar Pine, California, circa 1915.

Operations ceased in 1931 because of declining timber supplies and the effects of the Great Depression. The graded railroad right-of-way remained in place and was later reused by the Stauffer family, which reconstructed part of the line in 1961. The present-day railroad uses locomotives, converted log cars, and other equipment acquired from the West Side Lumber Company railway after it ended operations in 1961.

The railroad opened to the public in 1966 using Shay No. 10 and several converted log cars. Over time, the operation expanded to include additional excursion trains and the Lewis Creek Amphitheater. The Thornberry Museum, located in a relocated 19th-century log cabin at the depot, was later established to display exhibits related to Sierra Nevada logging history.

After retiring in 1981, Rudy Stauffer was succeeded by his son Max Stauffer as owner and operator of the railroad. Max Stauffer died on March 10, 2017.

In August 2017, the Railroad Fire, which began near the railroad, destroyed several pieces of former West Side Lumber Company equipment stored on a side track.

== Route ==
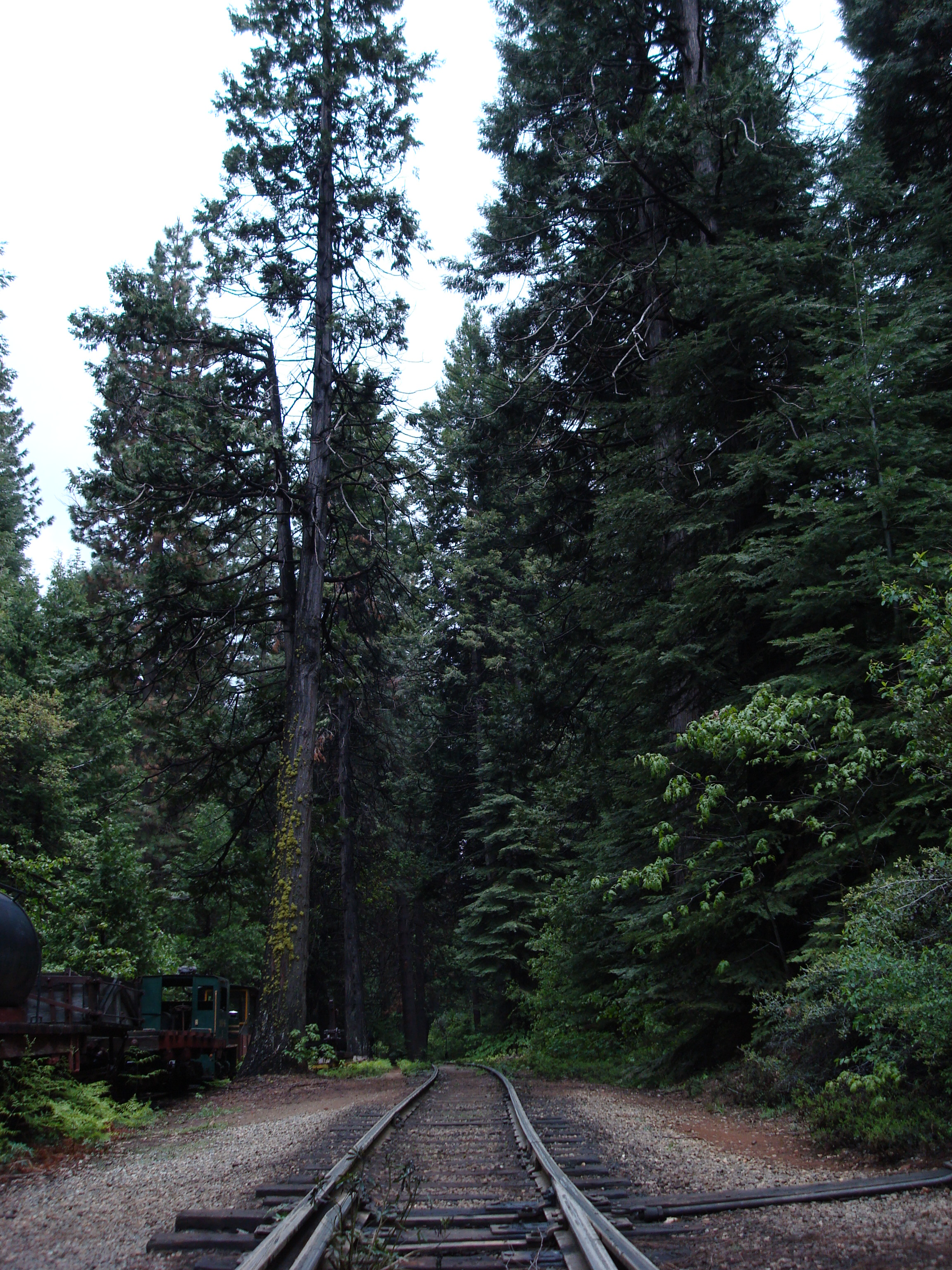
The railroad's right-of-way through the Sierra National Forest

The railroad operates a 4-mile (6.4 km) round-trip excursion from its depot at 56001 State Route 41 in Fish Camp, at an elevation of approximately 5,000 feet (1,500 m). The line runs southward along part of the former Madera Sugar Pine Lumber Company logging grade through second-growth ponderosa pine and mixed conifer forest in the Sierra National Forest.

The line's only intermediate stop is at a loop in Lewis Creek Canyon. The site includes a picnic area and the Lewis Creek Amphitheater, an open-air venue used for seasonal evening performances. The return trip includes a 4.5% grade ascending back to the depot, a gradient suited to the railroad's geared Shay locomotives.

The standard daytime excursion, known as the "Logger Steam Train", takes approximately one hour. Seasonal evening excursions, including the Moonlight Special dinner train and the Jazz Train, last approximately three hours and include events at the amphitheater. Remains of large stumps from the original old-growth timber harvested during the lumber company's operations between 1899 and 1931 are visible along the route.

The present-day tourist railroad preserves approximately 2 miles (3.2 km) of what was once the Madera Sugar Pine Lumber Company's 140 miles (230 km) logging railroad network in the central Sierra Nevada.

== Locomotives ==
The Yosemite Mountain Sugar Pine Railroad features a collection of historic locomotives, including two operational steam locomotives:

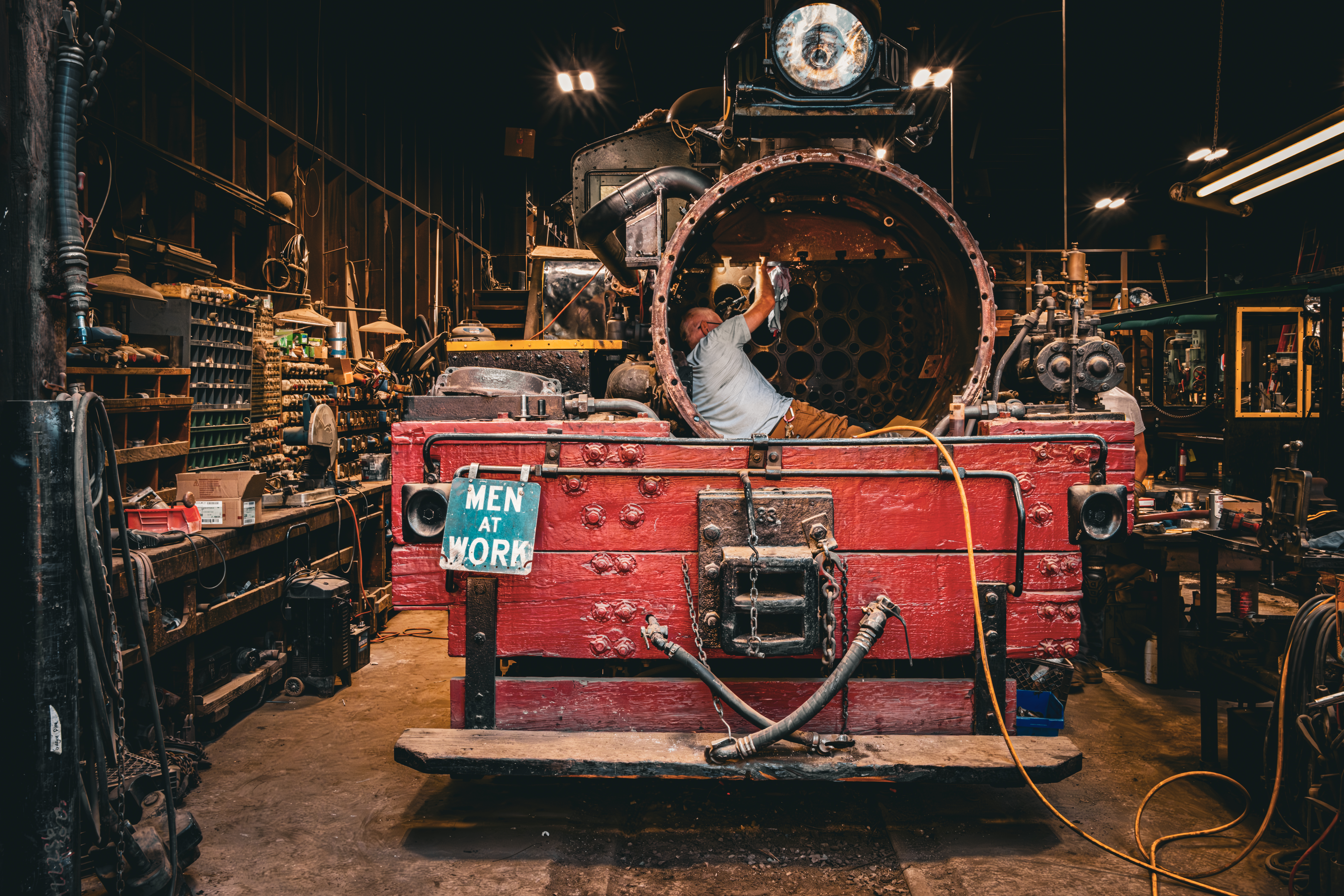
A worker tends the boiler of Shay No. 10, reputedly the largest narrow-gauge Shay locomotive ever built

Locomotives of the Yosemite Mountain Sugar Pine Railroad
No.	Type	Year built	Manufacturer	Details	Image
10	Narrow Gauge Shay Locomotive	1928	Lima Locomotive Works	Reputedly the largest narrow gauge Shay locomotive ever constructed. Originally built for the Pickering Lumber Company, later used by the West Side Lumber Company before joining YMSPRR. It burns oil and has a capacity of 1,200 US gal (4,500 L) of oil and 3,400 US gal (13,000 L) of water.	Shay locomotive No. 10
12	Narrow Gauge Shay Locomotive	1926	Lima Locomotive Works	Originally built for the Swayne Lumber Company, later used by the West Side Lumber Company. Acquired from the Colorado Railroad Museum in 2026.	Shay locomotive No. 12
15	Narrow Gauge Shay Locomotive	1913	Lima Locomotive Works	Worked for several companies, including Norman P. Livermore & Co., Sierra Nevada Wood & Lumber Co., Hobart Estate Co., Hyman-Michaels Co., and the West Side Lumber Company. Acquired by YMSPRR in 1988. It burns oil and has a capacity of 1,000 US gal (3,800 L) of oil and 2,000 US gal (7,600 L) of water.	Shay locomotive No. 15
	Converted Ford Model A	1927–1931	Ford Motor Company	Ford Model A automobiles converted into "Jenny" railcars by the West Side Lumber Company. Each accommodates about 12 people, providing regular service alongside steam operations.	Jenny railcar converted from a Ford Model A
5	Diesel Switch Engine	1935	Not specified	A two-axle diesel switch engine, not in operating condition.	Diesel switch engine No. 5
402	Center Cab Diesel Locomotive	Not specified	Not specified	A center cab two-truck diesel locomotive. Not used by YMSPRR for regular scheduled service.	Center cab diesel locomotive No. 402

== Points of interest ==
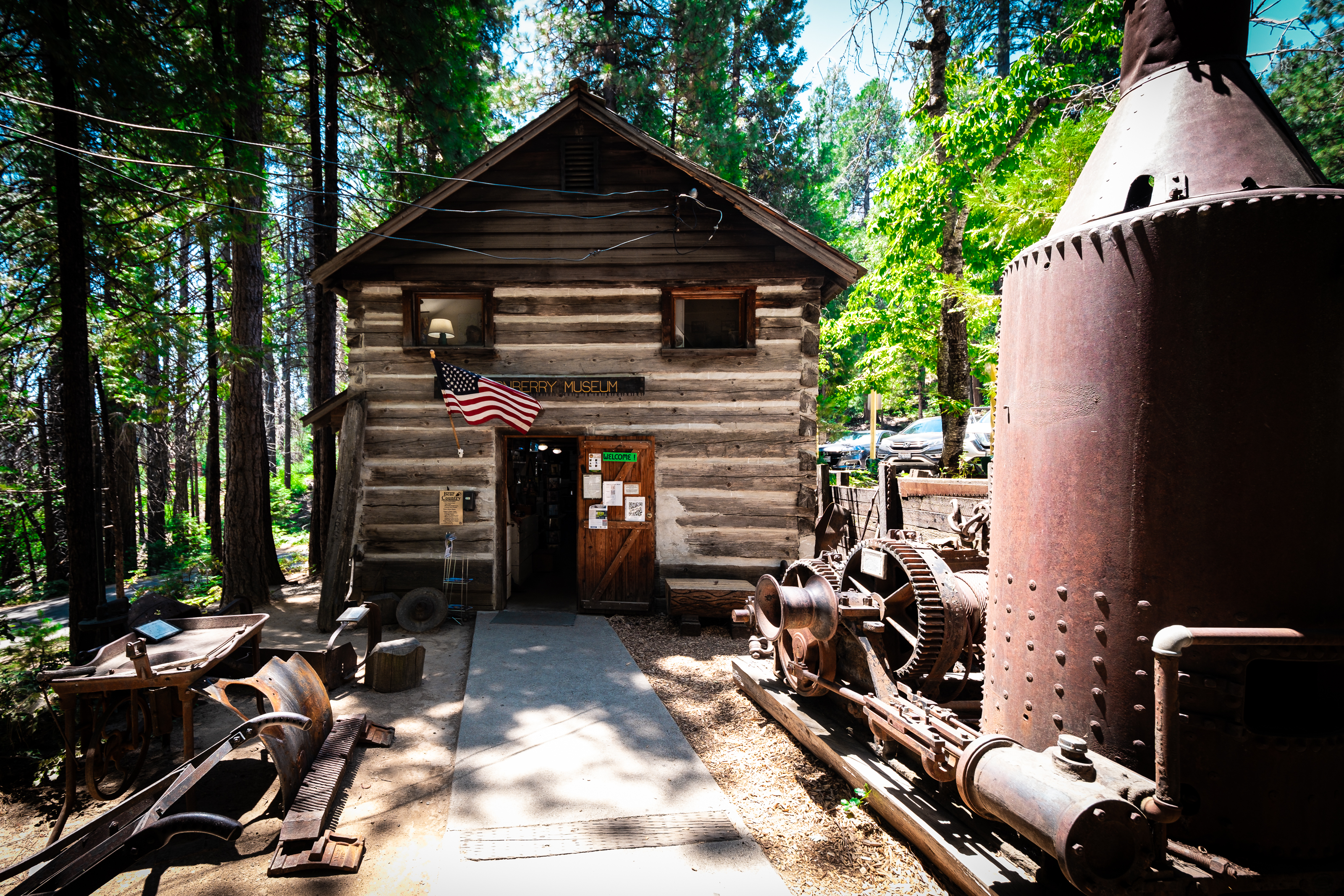
Thornberry Museum

At the railroad's depot are:

- The Thornberry Museum, housed in a relocated 19th-century log cabin, which contains exhibits related to the history of the Sierra Nevada region.
- The Sugar Pine Trading Company, a gift shop and bookstore with material related to the YMSPRR, railroads, and the history of Yosemite Valley.
- Gold panning.
- The West Side Lumber Company's narrow-gauge snowplow No. 2.

The turnaround point in Lewis Creek Canyon includes picnic and event grounds, including the Lewis Creek Amphitheater, which is used for seasonal performances.

== See also ==
- List of heritage railroads in the United States
- Yosemite National Park
