= Fish Camp, California =

Census-designated place in Mariposa County, California

Fish Camp
- Census-designated place
- Fish Camp

- Location in Mariposa County, California

- Location within California Location within the United States
- Coordinates: 37°28′40″N 119°38′20″W
- Country: United States
- State: California
- County: Mariposa

Area
  - Total: 0.402 sq mi (1.042 km^{2})
  - Land: 0.400 sq mi (1.036 km^{2})
  - Water: 0.0023 sq mi (0.006 km^{2}) 0.5%
- Elevation: 5,066 ft (1,544 m)

Population (2020)
  - Total: 49
  - Density: 123/sq mi (47.3/km^{2})
- Time zone: UTC-8 (Pacific (PST))
  - Summer (DST): UTC-7 (PDT)
- ZIP Code: 93623
- GNIS feature ID: 2583013
- FIPS code: 06-24218

Fish Camp is a census-designated place (CDP) in Mariposa County, California, United States, in the Sierra Nevada near the southern entrance to Yosemite National Park. It is located at an elevation of approximately 5,060 feet (1,540 m) and had a population of 49 at the 2020 census.

The community developed along routes connecting the San Joaquin Valley with Yosemite during the late 19th century and was associated with both logging and tourism. Fish Camp is now primarily a tourist community, with the Yosemite Mountain Sugar Pine Railroad, Tenaya at Yosemite, and recreation in the surrounding Sierra National Forest.

== Geography ==
Fish Camp is in the Sierra Nevada, on California State Route 41 near the southern entrance to Yosemite National Park, approximately 12 miles (19 km) north of Oakhurst. The community lies at an elevation of about 5,060 feet (1,540 m) in the valley of Big Creek and is surrounded by the Sierra National Forest. Big Creek flows north into Yosemite National Park, where it joins the South Fork of the Merced River near Wawona.

According to the United States Census Bureau, the Fish Camp census-designated place covers approximately 0.4 square miles (1.0 km^{2}), of which 0.002 square miles (0.005 km^{2}), or 0.5%, is water.

=== Climate ===
Fish Camp has a warm-summer Mediterranean climate (Köppen Csb), characterized by dry summers and cool, wet winters. Climate observations are recorded at the nearby South Entrance Yosemite National Park weather station, at an elevation of 5,047 feet (1,538 m).

=== Ecology ===
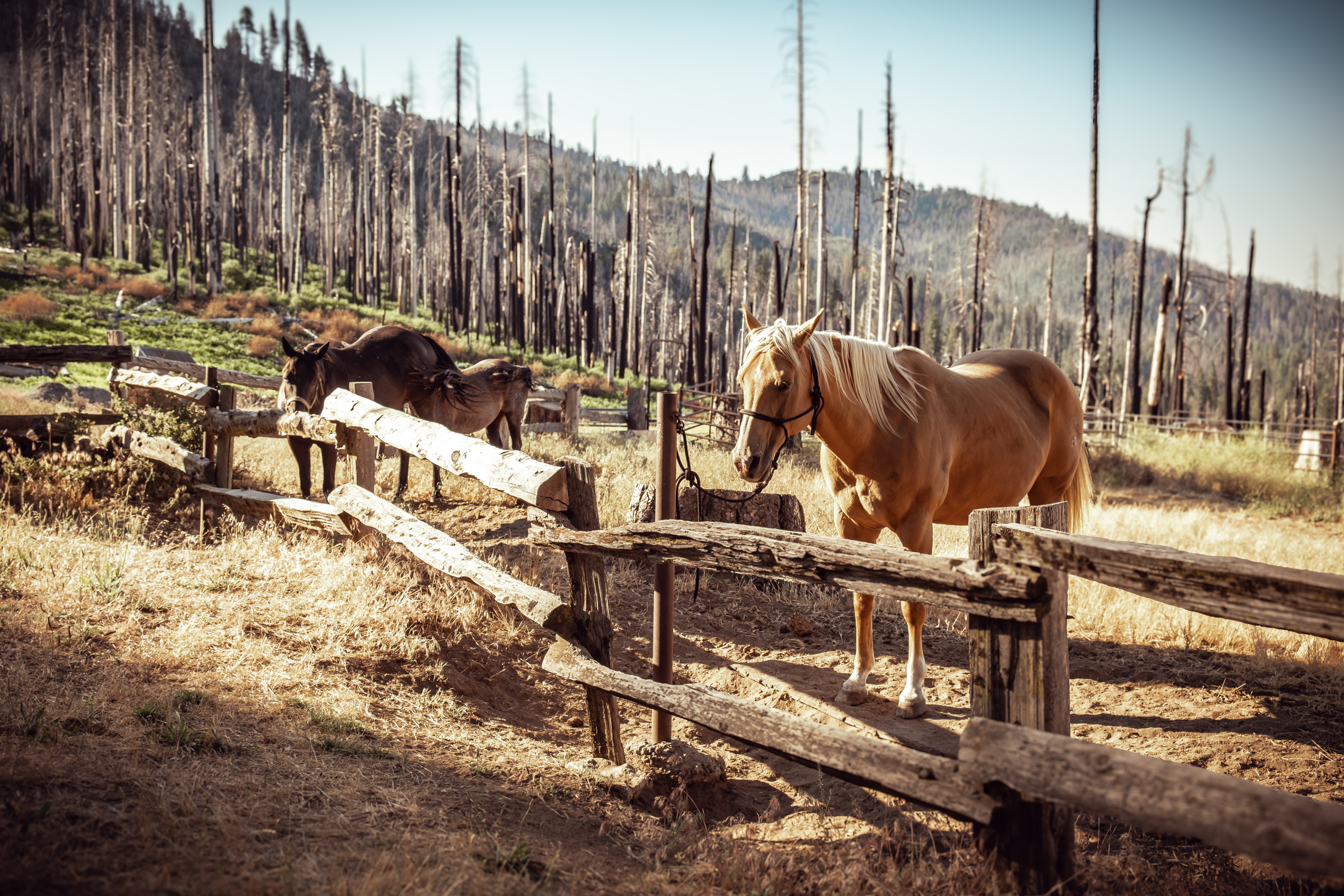
Forest near Fish Camp during the 2017 Railroad Fire.

The forests surrounding Fish Camp are primarily westside mixed-conifer and ponderosa–Jeffrey pine forest. Riparian vegetation occurs along Big Creek and other streams, while meadows occur in the surrounding forest, including Goat Meadow.

The surrounding forest provides habitat for several sensitive wildlife species. Forest Service surveys identified historic California spotted owl activity centers in the Fish Camp project area and a northern goshawk nest nearby. The area is also within the Southern Sierra Fisher Conservation Area; radio-tracking studies documented fishers using the Fish Camp area, while remote-camera surveys confirmed seasonal use by American martens.

== History ==
Native people used the Big Creek area seasonally for fishing, gathering acorns, and trade. Archaeological work at Fish Camp has found evidence of occupation dating to the Middle Archaic period, about 5,000 years ago, as well as obsidian indicating trade across the Sierra Nevada.

Euro-American settlement developed as roads were extended south from Wawona toward the San Joaquin Valley. The Yosemite Stage and Turnpike Company completed a road between Wawona and Fresno Flats in 1879, followed by a road to Madera in 1881. In 1881, Annie Philp took up a 640-acre timber claim along Big Creek and called the place Fish Camp, reportedly because of the number of fish caught there. Her husband, Albert Philp, built a two-story hotel in 1883 and later operated a freight service between Raymond and Yosemite Valley.

The settlement was also known as Summerdale. A post office under that name operated from 1893 until 1908, and late-19th-century photographs show a small community of hotels, a store, saloon, post office, barns, and other buildings. Small sawmills operated around Fish Camp during the 1880s. Logging increased after the Madera Sugar Pine Company was incorporated in 1899 and established its principal mill at Sugar Pine, south of Fish Camp. The company's logging railroad later extended through the Fish Camp area.

As logging declined, Fish Camp increasingly developed around recreation and travel to Yosemite National Park. Charles Beery acquired the former Philp property in 1925 and operated Beery's Paradise Lodge. Construction of the modern Wawona Road in 1932–33 improved automobile access to Yosemite from the south. Paradise Lodge burned in 1942, and the property was sold the following year to the H. J. Baker Real Estate Company, which built the Silver Tip Lodge in 1944–45. The Silver Tip became a center for community events, including annual turkey shoots and bear barbecues. The lodge was destroyed by arson in 1981.

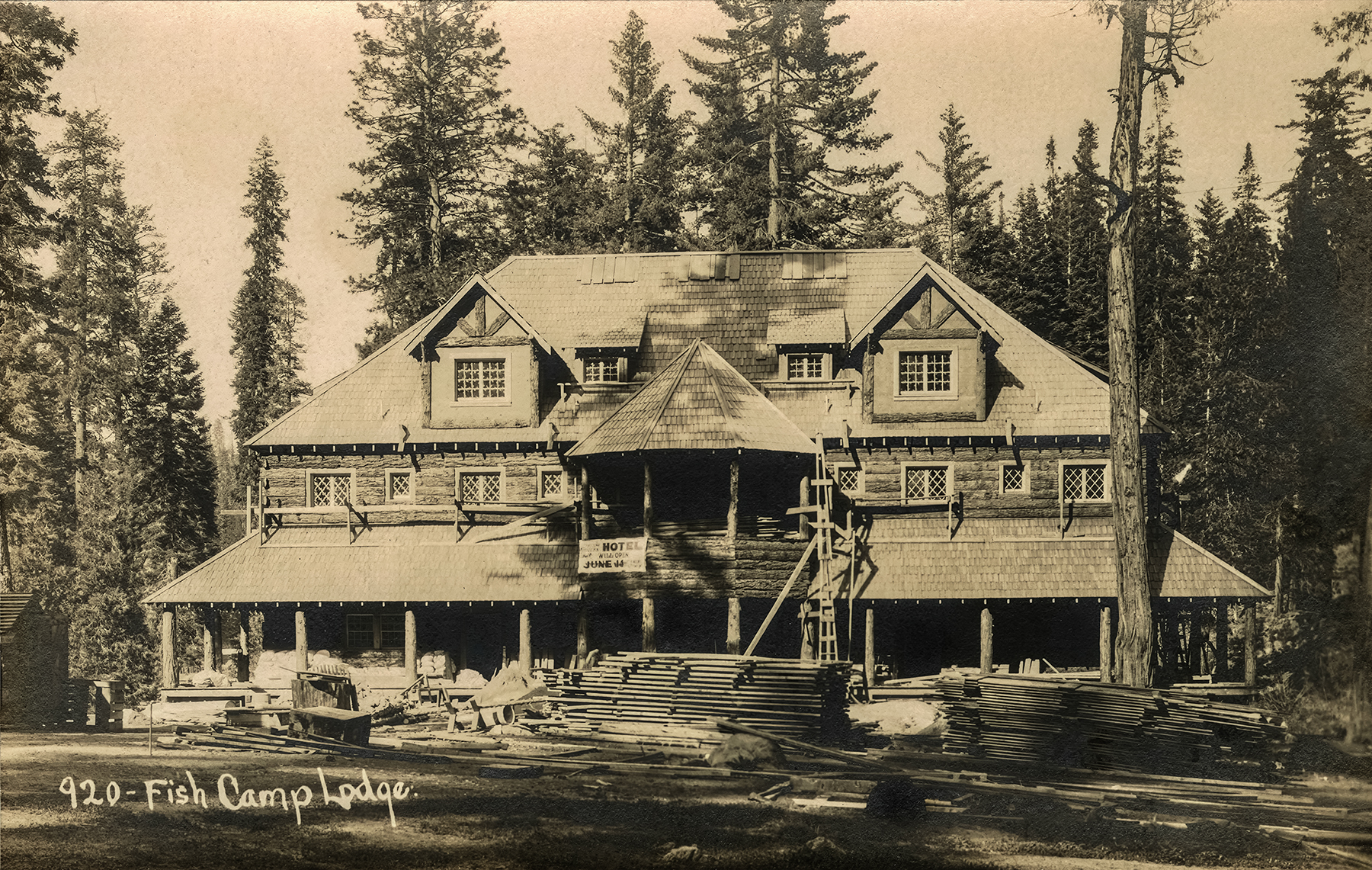
Construction of Fish Camp Lodge, 1904

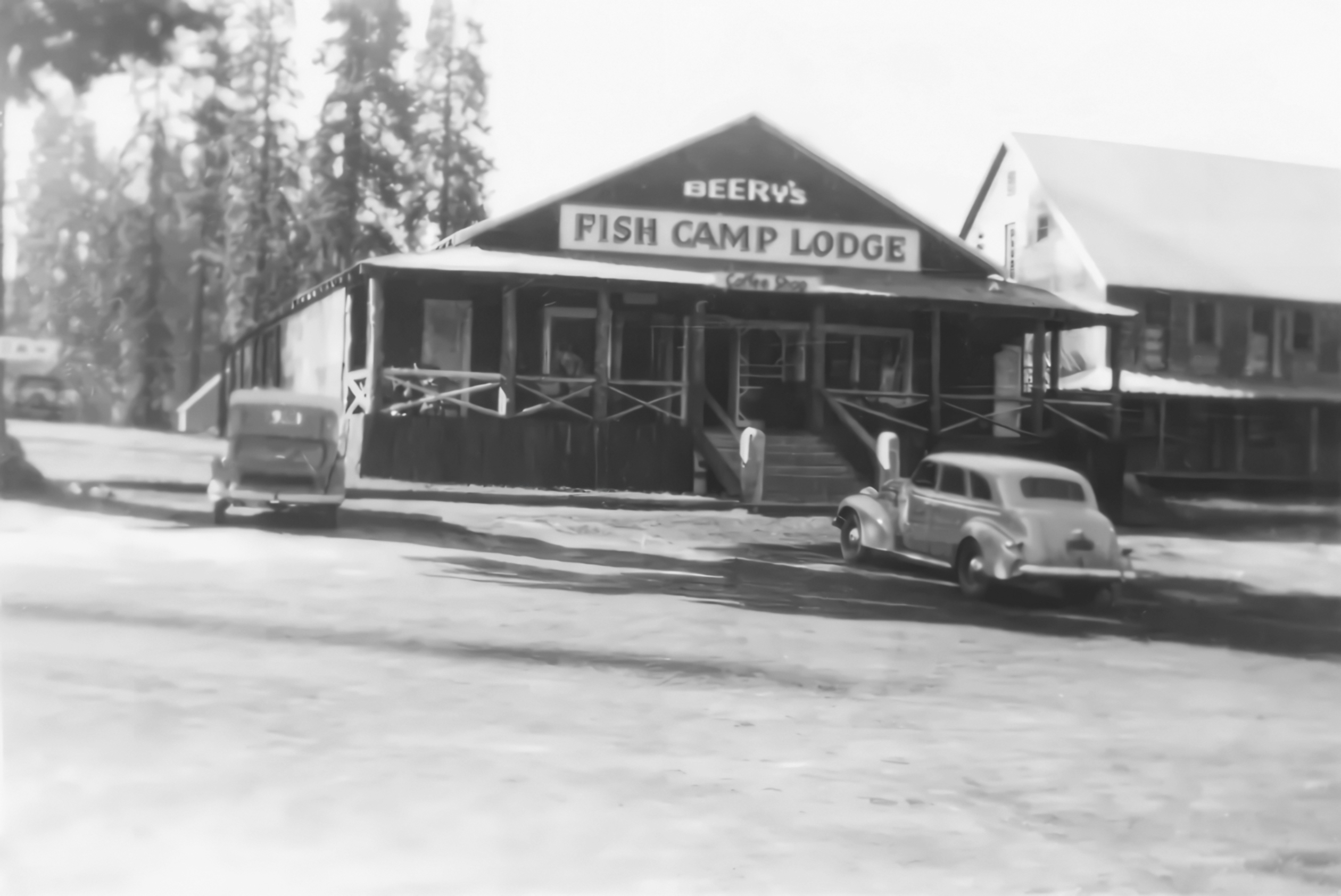
Beery's Fish Camp Lodge

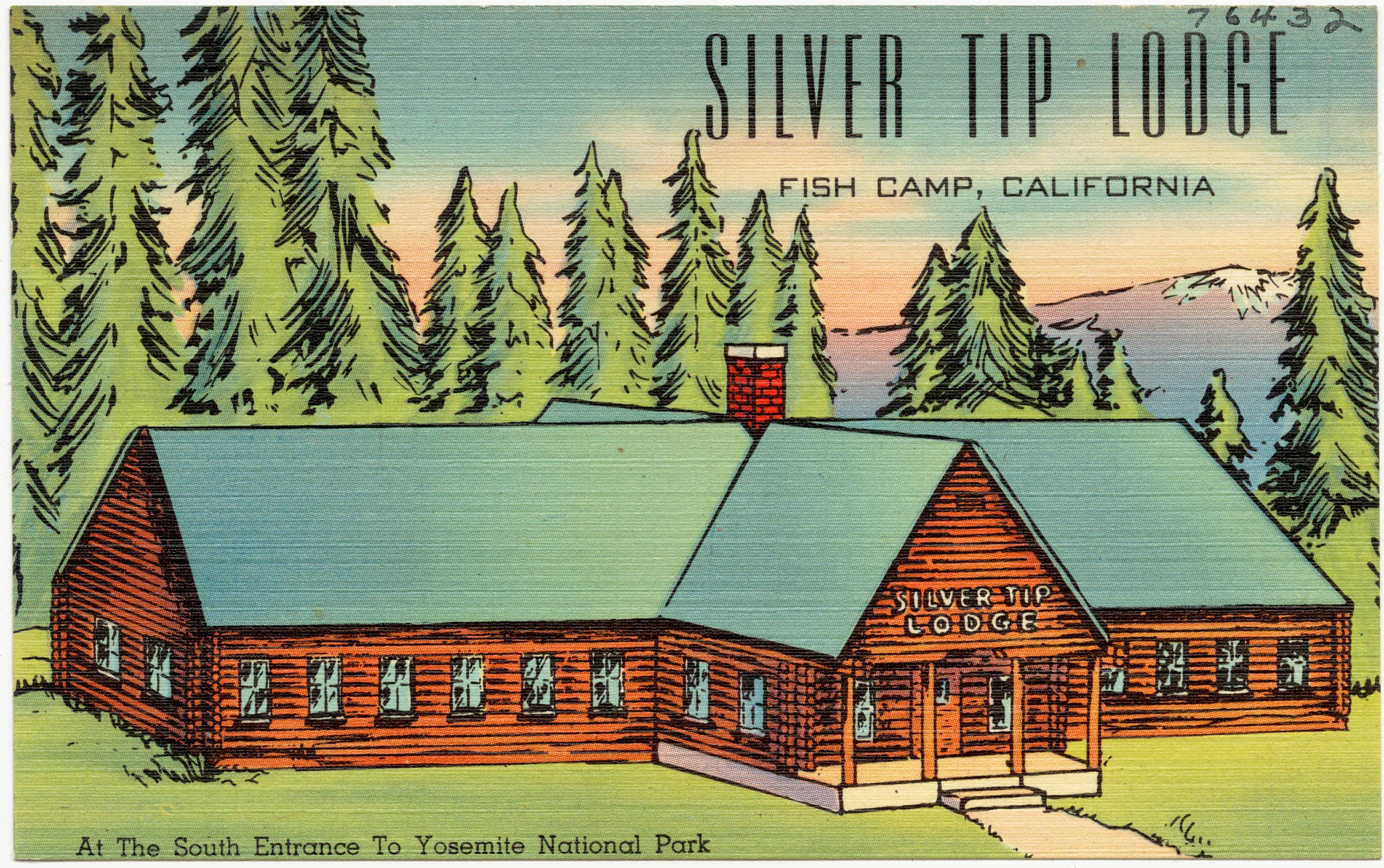
Silver Tip Lodge postcard

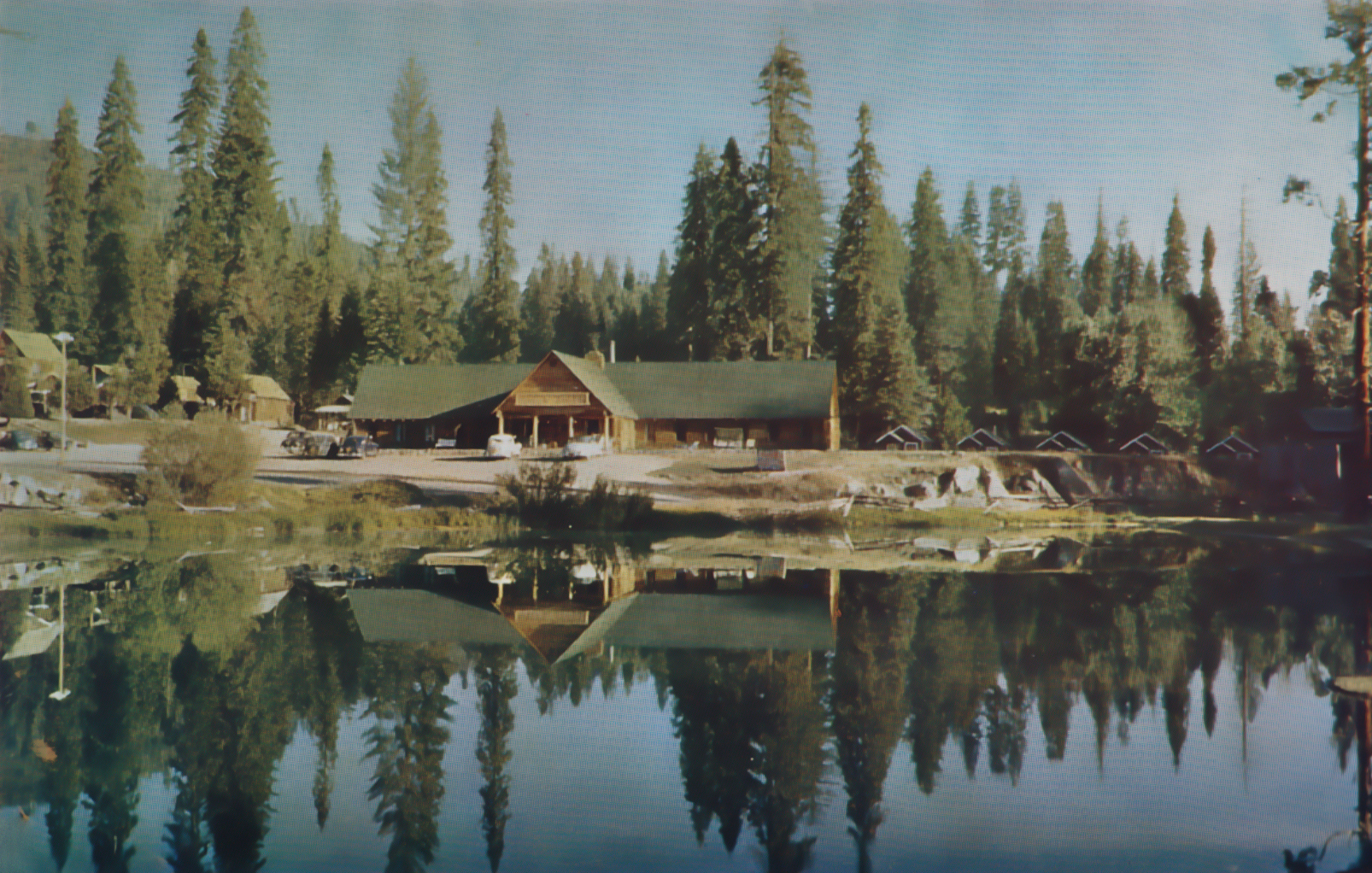
Silver Tip Lodge, 1946

Tourism continued to replace logging as the community's principal activity. The Yosemite Mountain Sugar Pine Railroad began carrying tourists over a portion of the former logging railroad in 1967, and Marriott International opened the 242-room Tenaya Lodge in 1990.

== Demographics ==
Historical population
Census	Pop.	Note	%±
2010	59		—
2020	49		−16.9%
U.S. Decennial Census

Fish Camp first appeared as a census-designated place in the 2010 United States census, when it had a population of 59.

The 2020 United States census reported a population of 49, with a population density of 122.5 inhabitants per square mile (47.3/km^{2}). Of the residents, 44 (90%) were Non-Hispanic White and 5 (10%) were Hispanic or Latino. The median age was 55.6 years.

There were 29 households, including 10 families and 13 people living alone. Of 154 housing units, only 29 were occupied; 9 were owner-occupied and 20 were renter-occupied.

== Tourism and recreation ==
Tourism in Fish Camp is centered on its proximity to the southern entrance of Yosemite National Park and recreation in the surrounding Sierra National Forest.

The Yosemite Mountain Sugar Pine Railroad is a 3-foot (914 mm) narrow-gauge railway operating over a portion of the former Madera Sugar Pine Company logging railroad. Rudy Stauffer began developing the tourist railroad in the 1960s, and the first excursion operated in 1967. The railroad operates approximately four miles of track using two Shay steam locomotives and includes a museum devoted to the area's logging history.

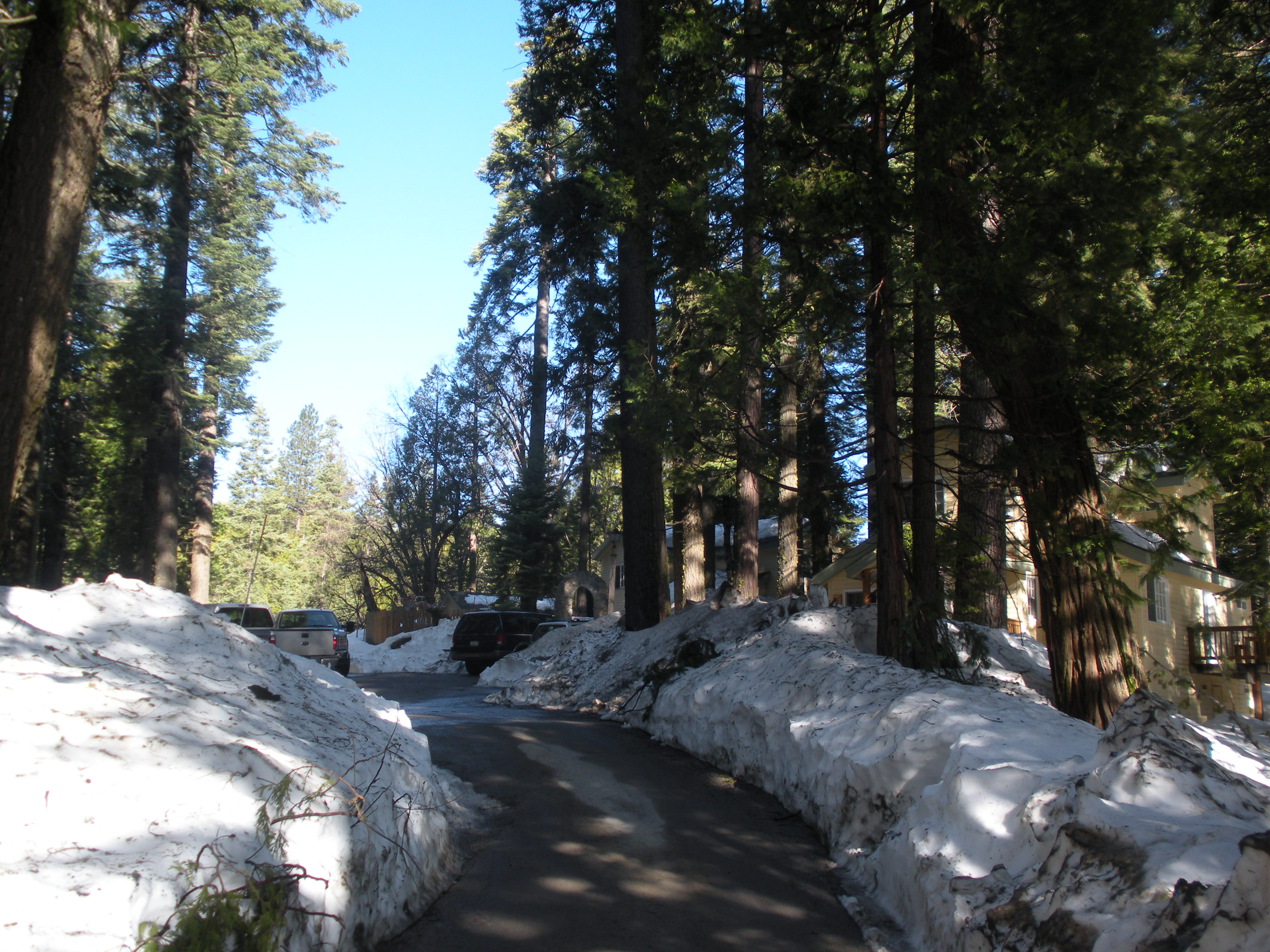
Tenaya Lodge, a hotel in Fish Camp

Tenaya at Yosemite is a resort in Fish Camp that opened in 1990 and has been owned and operated by Delaware North since 2001. The property includes the main lodge, cottages added in 2008, and 50 Explorer Cabins opened in 2019.

Goat Meadow, in the Sierra National Forest north of Fish Camp, is used for winter snow play and dispersed recreation.
