= Shelly Davis-King =

American anthropologist (born 1949)

- Born: January 7, 1949 (age 77)
- Education: University of California Santa Barbara (BA) University of Arkansas (MA) University of Cambridge Arizona State University California State College
- Occupations: Archaeologist, anthropologist, ethnographer, ethnohistorian
- Awards: Society for California Archaeology President's Award Society for California Archaeology David A. Fredrickson Lifetime Achievement Award Tuolumne County Board of Supervisors Certificate of Recognition

Shelly Davis-King (born 1949, née Davis) is an American anthropologist working in the field of cultural resource management. Throughout her career she has pioneered the use of ethnographic methods in that field and has been a stalwart advocate for California's native peoples. She served as the 2005–2006 President of the Society for California Archeology, an organization she helped found. This organization has recognized her achievements on multiple occasions.

== Education ==
Shelly Davis-King began her career in archaeology studying at the Pierce School for Girls in Athens, Greece followed by four years at University of California, Santa Barbara in the late 1960s. Here she faced sexism from some faculty members who supposed that she was taking time and attention away from "serious men." This, in many ways, caused her to become committed to a career in anthropology. While studying for her Bachelor of the Arts (BA), Davis-King participated in two summer field schools at Arizona State University.

After receiving her BA in 1971, Davis-King pursued a Masters of Arts (MA) in anthropology at the University of Arkansas, Fayetteville. At this time, the faculty at this institution were promoting and at the vanguard of "salvage archaeology," the predecessor of today's cultural resource management. This not only allowed her to also be at the forefront of this new approach to archaeology, but also to start her own consulting company: Shelly Davis-King, Archaeologist. This company would eventually develop into Davis-King & Associates which exists today. During this time she was part of multiple discussions and forums concerning the legal groundwork for archaeological and historic preservation at the federal level.

After receiving her MA in 1973, Davis-King pursued a PhD at the University of Cambridge in England. Here, she came into contact with the much more developed cultural resource management program of the United Kingdom which allowed her to develop business and heritage preservation skills related to archaeological research. During this time, she both continued her studies and continued to develop her own consulting business. Although she advanced to the role of PhD candidate, personal reasons caused her to leave the program without defending her dissertation.

== Career ==
Although Davis-King had already engaged in professional consulting work while a student, her premature departure from Cambridge in 1979 led to a hiatus from the field of archaeology. During this time, she worked in advertising and in the budding small computer industry. She also worked as a writer and producer for Videowest, an alternative television program. In this position she both wrote and conducted interviews for shows on topics ranging from sex to jazz. This honed her ethnographic methods through interviews, a skill most useful in her ethnographic research.

In 1984, circumstances brought her back into the field of archaeology. During this time, she contributed heavily to California's archeological record through various compliance documents, field reports, and historic context statements. Overtime, she became a point of contact between local Native American tribes and the world of cultural resource management. This led her to develop ethnographic skills and integrate Native American perspectives into work where such groups have historically not been included.

Davis-King's work, now through her company Davis-King & Associates, is based in the application of ethnographic methods to cultural resource management work, especially focusing on tribal landscapes, ethnobotanical studies, ethnoecological investigations, and the integration of tribal perspectives into heritage preservation. This work is done in conjunction with a variety of groups including federal and state agencies, utility companies, and Native American tribes themselves.

In addition to her paid work throughout her career, Davis-King has been active in many professional associations, historic preservation organizations, and advocacy groups. She has held or continues to hold leadership and service positions with the Society of California Archaeology, the American Cultural Resources Association, the Register of Professional Archaeologists, and the CalFlora Board of Directors. This is in addition to countless other professional, advocacy, and advisory organizations of which she is or has been a member. She has also been involved in multiple Tuolumne County boards, commissions, and committees.
