= Glen Bell =

American businessman and restaurateur (1923–2010)

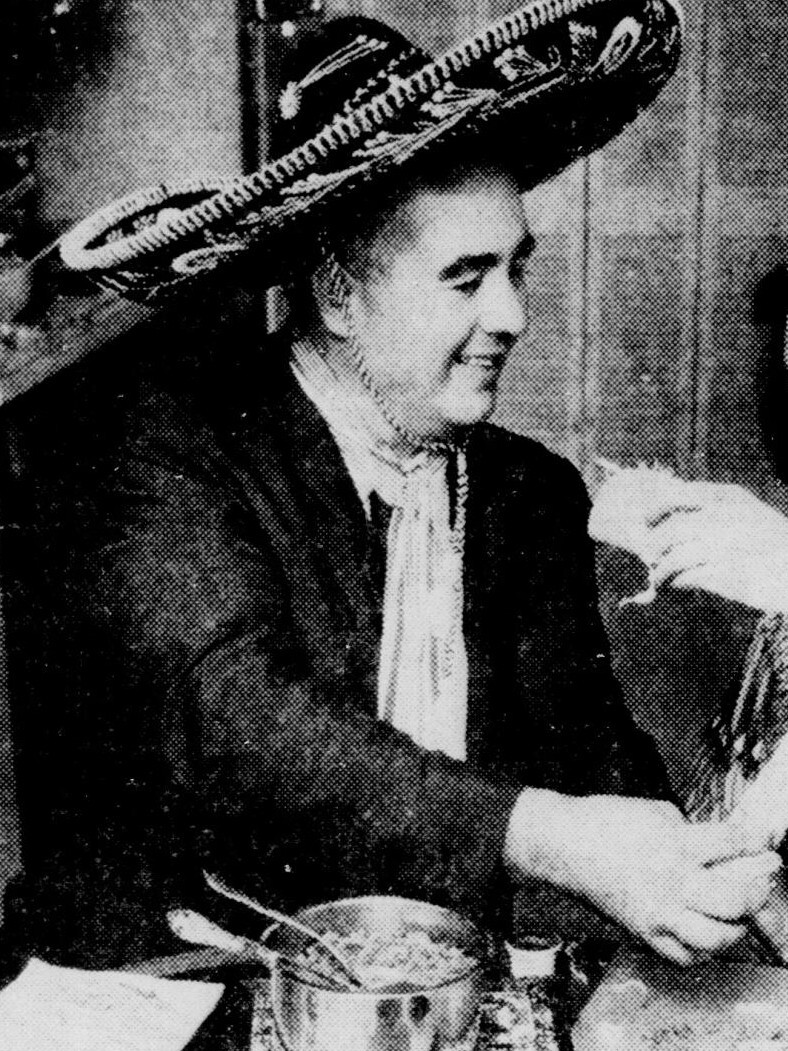
- Bell in 1968
- Born: Glen William Bell Jr. September 3, 1923; Lynwood, California, U.S.
- Died: January 16, 2010 (aged 86); Rancho Santa Fe, California, U.S.
- Resting place: Ashes sprinkled in Torrance, California
- Occupation: Restaurateur
- Years active: 1948–2010
- Known for: Founder of Taco Bell restaurants
- Spouse: Martha Bell
- Children: 3
- Military career
- Allegiance: United States
- Branch: United States Marine Corps
- Conflicts: World War II

Glen William Bell Jr. (September 3, 1923 – January 16, 2010) was an American restaurateur who was the founder and namesake of Taco Bell.

== Early life ==
Glen Bell was born in Lynwood, California, to Glen William Bell Sr. and Ruth Elizabeth Bell (née Johnson). His mother was born in Kandiyohi County, Minnesota, to a half Swedish father and predominantly English mother. His father was born in Franklin County, Iowa, to a German father and predominantly English mother. Glen also had colonial New England ancestry through both his parents' families.

== Career ==
Bell graduated from San Bernardino High School in 1941. He served in the U.S. Marine Corps as a cook during World War II. After the Marines, he started his first hot dog stand 'Bell's Drive-In', in San Bernardino in 1948.

He is credited with the idea of selling crispy-shell tacos in 1951, and commissioned a custom frying contraption from a man who made chicken coops.

In 1952, he sold the hot dog stand and built a second location selling hot dogs and hamburgers. He soon started selling tacos at a taco stand named Taco-Tia at 19 cents each from a side window. Between 1954 and 1955, he opened three Taco Tias in the San Bernardino area, eventually selling those restaurants and opening four El Tacos with a partner in the Long Beach area. He partnered with John Galardi, originally hired as a part-time worker and then a manager. Galardi later founded the Wienerschnitzel hot dog chain.

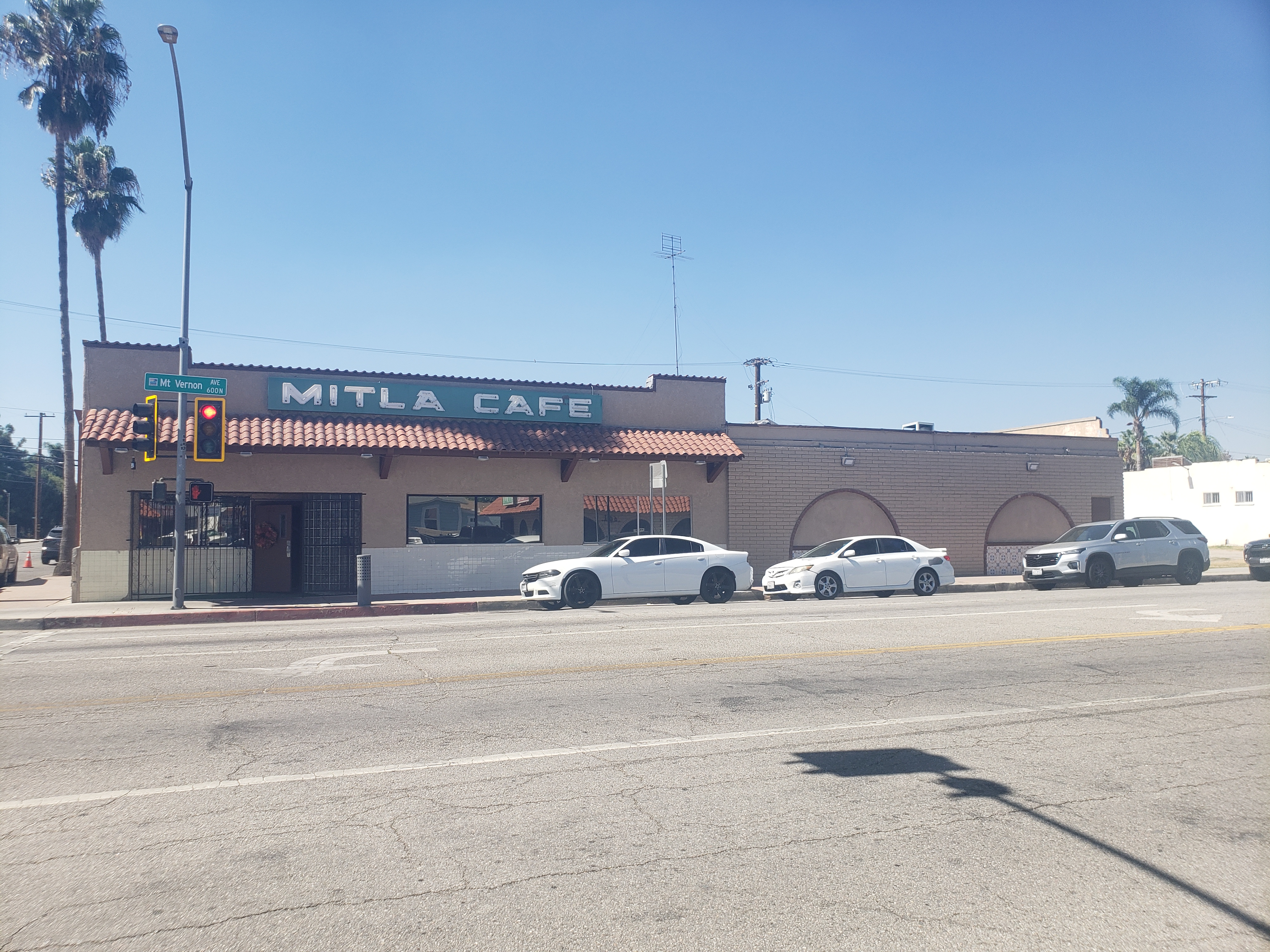
Mitla Café on Mount Vernon Avenue

Glen Bell learned how to make tacos from the Mitla Café in San Bernardino after the owners and head chef Gloria Hoyle taught him the recipes of their family’s famous Dorado style tacos.

In 1962, he went solo and sold the El Tacos to his partner and opened his first Taco Bell in Downey, California. Bell franchised his restaurant in 1964. His company grew rapidly, and the 868-restaurant chain was later sold to PepsiCo in 1978 for $125 million in stock.

=== West Side and Cherry Valley Railroad ===
In the late 1970s, Bell opened a tourist railroad at Tuolumne, California. This 3 ft (914 mm) gauge railroad used the lower section of the track and several steam locomotives of the West Side Lumber Company railway. The operation offered boat rides on the old mill pond and RV parking. In the initial plan, there were themed areas of the park with restaurants and stores. Glen Bell was able to locate and purchase old equipment (trains, cars, water towers, etc.) that were used in logging operations and brought to the park. It closed in the early 1980s after falling traffic.

The property was eventually sold off to the Tuolumne tribe of the Mi Wuk Natives who have developed the land including event grounds.

== Death ==
Bell died from Parkinson's disease on January 16, 2010, at age 86 in Rancho Santa Fe, California, leaving wife, Martha; two sons; one daughter; four grandchildren; and three sisters.
