= Tuolumne Band of Me-Wuk Indians =

Total population
- 168 tribal members on the rancheria, 285 enrolled (1995)

Regions with significant populations
- United States (California)

Languages
- English, Central Sierra Miwok language

Related ethnic groups
- other Miwok and Yokut peoples

The Tuolumne Band of Me-Wuk Indians is a federally recognized tribe of Miwok people in Tuolumne County, California. The Tuolumne Band are central Sierra Miwok people. Annually, in September, the tribe holds an acorn festival and intertribal gathering.

Awani descendants from Yosemite Valley are also enrolled in the Tuolumne Band of Me-Wuk Indians.

== Government ==
The Tuolumne Band is headquartered in Tuolumne, California. The governing body for the tribe is a legislative body referred to as the "Community Council". Council officers of the Tuolumne Me-Wuk Tribal Council (TMTC) are democratically elected from among the tribal members; the current tribal chairperson is Kevin Day. The governmental structure for the executive aspects of tribal government (those that provide services to the tribe) is managed by the chief executive officer, who exercises authority over various governmental departments addressing tribal needs, which includes, but are not limited to: the Rancheria Fire Department, Tribal Law Enforcement, the Cultural Department, the Education Department & the Tribal School, the Housing Authority, the Fiscal Department, the Recreation Department, and Social Services.

Several community health care agencies are also operated by the tribe, including the Tuolumne Me-Wuk Indian Health Center in Tuolumne, the Tuolumne Me-Wuk Cedar Road Health Center in Sonora, the Tuolumne Me-Wuk Dental Center in Sonora, and the MEWU:YA Substance Abuse Recovery Offices in Tuolumne.

== Reservation ==
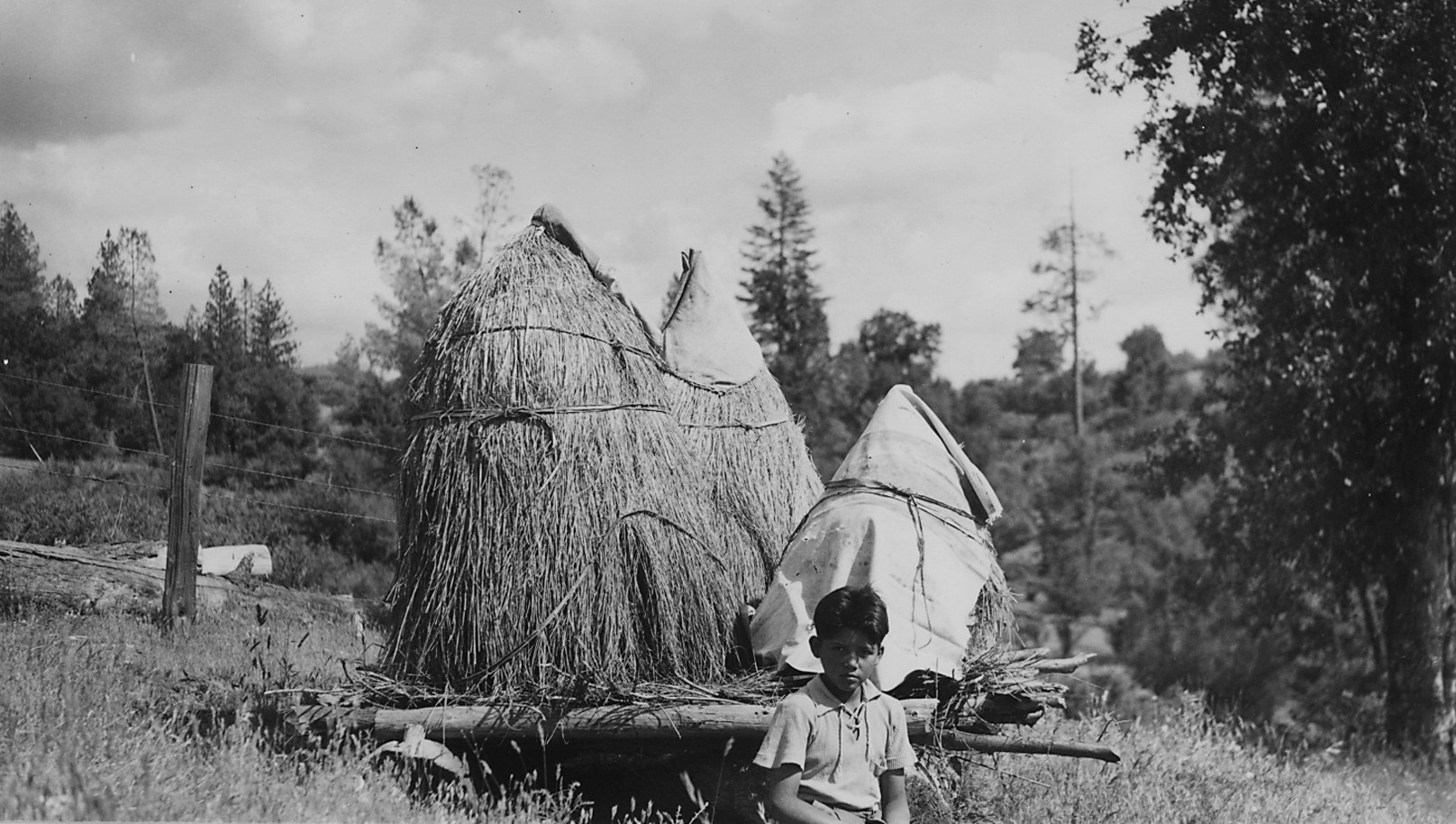
A Tuolumne boy stands next to several acorn silos, 1937

The Tuolumne Rancheria (37°58′51″N 120°14′17″W) is a 792.69 acre federal Indian reservation in Tuolumne County, at the western base of the Sierra Nevada. It is located near Yosemite National Park. The rancheria was established in 1910, and had a population of 150 in 1990. In 1995 the population was 168. The reservation lies in and just north of the township of Tuolumne. The Tribe owns, as private property (not Indian Reservation), an additional 1,510.41 acres of land. Other nearby communities include Twain Harte, Soulsbyville, and Mono Vista.

== Economics ==
The Tuolumne Band of Me-Wuk Indians economic arm is the Tuolumne Economic Development Authority (TEDA), through which many of the construction projects for the Tribe are planned and completed.

The Tribe owns and operates several business in Tuolumne County, the most prominent of which is the Black Oak Casino Resort, which includes a casino, a hotel, an arcade with bowling alley, and several restaurants, bars, and lounges. The Tribal Gaming Agency (TGA) was established by the Tribe to regulate, license, investigate, and monitor all gaming activities at these facilities.

Other economic ventures pursued by the Tribe and TEDA, which are often affiliated with Black Oak Casino Resort, but not managed by the Resort, include the Teleli Golf Course, the Westside Pavilion Music & Event Venue, the RV Park at Black Oak, the Bear Creek Gas Station, the Tuolumne Square Shopping Center, and the Native Plant Nursery.

== Notable tribal members ==
- Dorothy Stanley (1924–1990) Miwok educator and politician

== See also ==
- Miwok people
- Sierra Miwok
