= Tuolumne City, California =

Tuolumne City, California Tuolumne
- census-designated place
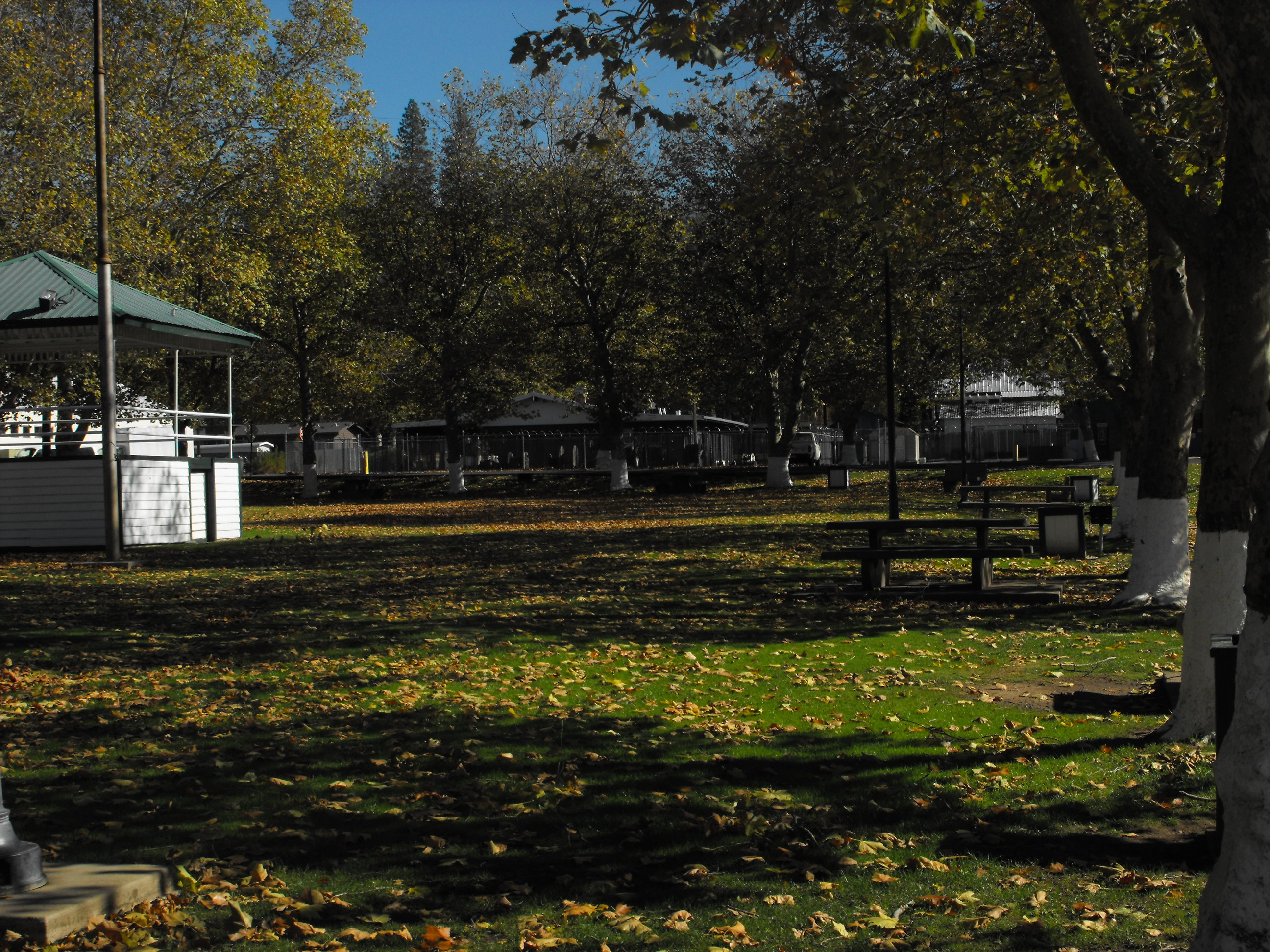
- West Side Memorial Park, Tuolumne

- Location in Tuolumne County and the state of California

- Location in the United States
- Coordinates: 37°57′42″N 120°14′13″W
- Country: United States
- State: California
- County: Tuolumne

Area
  - Total: 2.359 sq mi (6.109 km^{2})
  - Land: 2.356 sq mi (6.101 km^{2})
  - Water: 0.0027 sq mi (0.007 km^{2}) 0.12%
- Elevation: 2,569 ft (783 m)

Population (2020)
  - Total: 1,798
  - Density: 763.3/sq mi (294.7/km^{2})
- Time zone: UTC-8 (Pacific (PST))
  - Summer (DST): UTC-7 (PDT)
- ZIP code: 95379
- Area code: 209
- FIPS code: 06-80763
- GNIS feature IDs: 1867064, 2409362

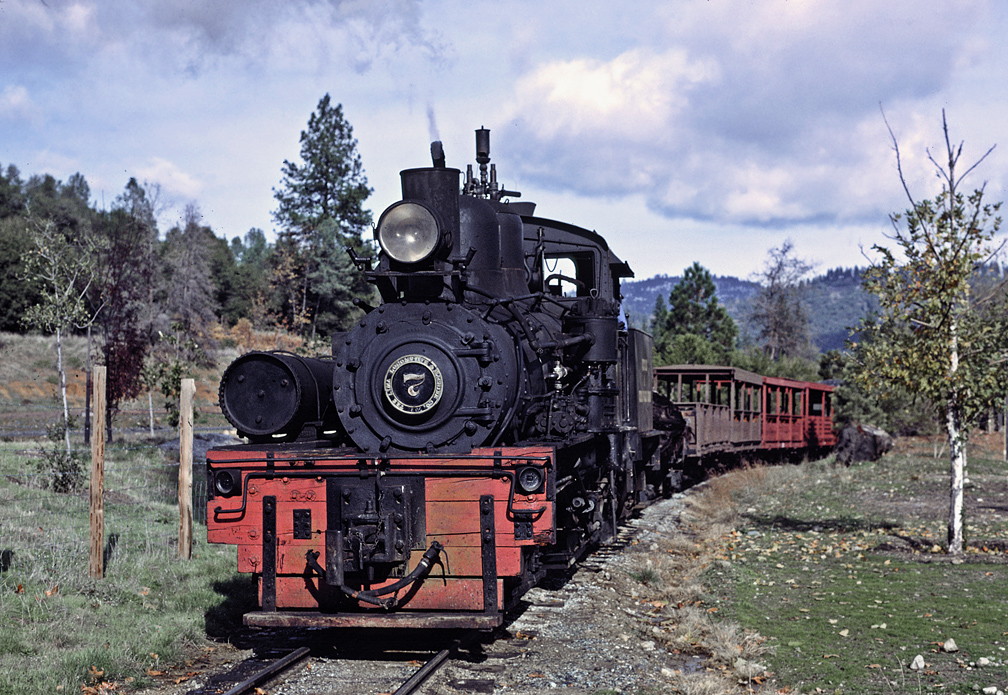
West Side Lumber Company Shay No.7, inside the old millyard at Tuolumne, 1981. WSL Shay No. 7 now operates at the Roaring Camp and Big Trees Narrow Gauge Railroad.

Tuolumne City (/tuˈɒləmi/) is an unincorporated town in Tuolumne County, California, United States. A census-designated place (CDP) officially known as Tuolumne also encompasses the town. The population of the CDP was 1,798 at the 2020 census, up from 1,779 at the 2010 census.

== History ==
The area is known for a history of logging operations. Remnants of logging railroads are still present in the area.

In the 1970s, Herbert Reichhold planned to open a theme park using narrow gauge live steam railroad equipment left over from the commercial logging operations. He envisioned transforming the town of Tuolumne into a "Railroad Theme Park", and he began purchasing properties in the town. However he abandoned the plans after the death of his wife.

In the late 1970s, Glen Bell, the founder of the Taco Bell chain, opened the "Westside and Cherry Valley Railroad" in Tuolumne. This ran for approximately five miles from the old lumber mill in the town, into the mountains. It used the track and several 3 ft (914 mm) gauge locomotives from the logging company. This tourist attraction lasted for several years, but closed in the mid-1980s.

== Communications and facilities ==
Unlike the rest of Tuolumne County, Tuolumne was not in the Bell System/SBC service area. Tuolumne Telephone Company provided service to this area. Wired telephone numbers in the Tuolumne Central Office follow the pattern (209) 928-xxxx. Tuolumne Telephone is now part of Citizens Telecommunications Company of California, a subsidiary of Frontier Communications.

There are three schools: Summerville Elementary with grades K-8, Mother Lode Christian School with grades K-12, and Summerville Union High School with grades 9–12. Summerville High School also hosts Tuolumne County's Connections Arts School for grades 7–12.

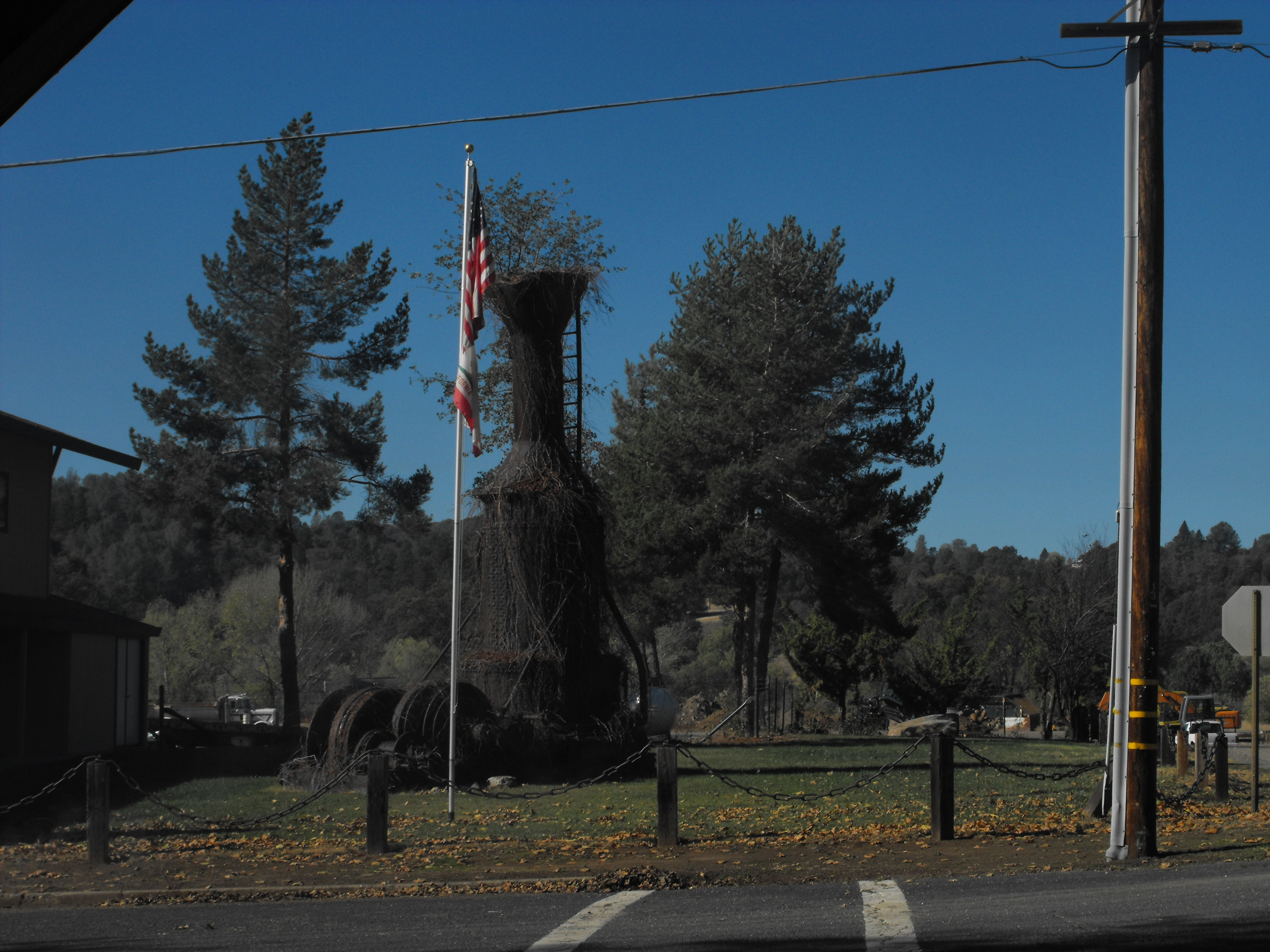
Preserved steam donkey next to the fire station

A logging company town, Tuolumne experienced an economic downturn when the West Side Lumber Company mill closed. For many years the community has struggled to create a new economic base.

The Tuolumne Band of Me-Wuk Indians, a federally recognized tribe, is headquartered in Tuolumne. In recent years, the tribe has contributed new growth with revenues from nearby Black Oak Casino, which is owned and operated by the Tuolumne Band. A new medical clinic and a new library are a few recent improvements. Another addition has been the renovation of the Tuolumne City Memorial Museum on Carter Street.

Once known as the two towns of "Summersville" in the south and "Carter" in the north, Tuolumne has incorporated them both into one town. A new municipal advisory council has been established to help with this revival.

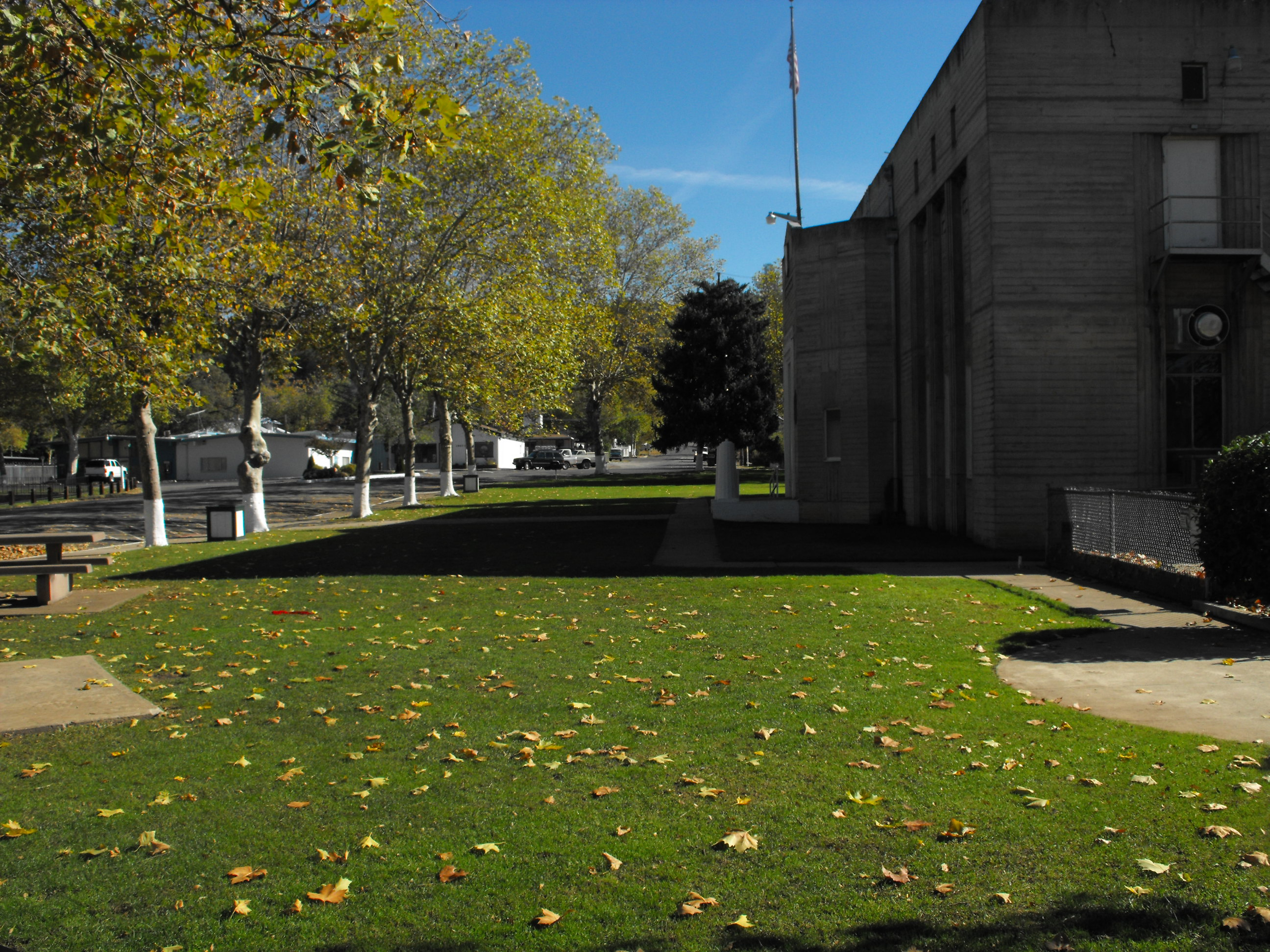
Memorial Hall which serves as the town hall and general meeting place

Tuolumne is also the birthplace of the Vaudevillian performer and hipster comedian Lord Buckley, born Richard Myrle Buckley, April 5, 1906, died November 12, 1960.

== Geography ==
Tuolumne is located at 37°57′42″N 120°14′13″W (37.961785, -120.236851).

According to the United States Census Bureau, the CDP has a total area of 2.4 square miles (6.2 km^{2}), of which 99.88% is land and 0.12% is water.

== Demographics ==
Historical population
Census	Pop.	Note	%±
1960	1,403		—
1970	1,365		−2.7%
1980	1,708		25.1%
1990	1,686		−1.3%
2000	1,865		10.6%
2010	1,779		−4.6%
2020	1,798		1.1%
U.S. Decennial Census; 1860–1870 1880-1890; 1900 1910 1920; 1930 1940 1950; 1960 1970 1980; 1990 2000 2010

Tuolumne City first appeared as an unincorporated community in the 1960 U.S. census; and as a census designated place in the 1980 U.S. census.

=== Racial and ethnic composition ===
Tuolumne City CDP, California – Racial and ethnic composition Note: the US Census treats Hispanic/Latino as an ethnic category. This table excludes Latinos from the racial categories and assigns them to a separate category. Hispanics/Latinos may be of any race.
Race / Ethnicity (NH = Non-Hispanic)	Pop 2000	Pop 2010	Pop 2020	% 2000	% 2010	% 2020
White alone (NH)	1,596	1,438	1,339	85.58%	80.83%	74.47%
Black or African American alone (NH)	5	7	6	0.27%	0.39%	0.33%
Native American or Alaska Native alone (NH)	70	59	64	3.75%	3.32%	3.56%
Asian alone (NH)	4	12	12	0.21%	0.67%	0.67%
Native Hawaiian or Pacific Islander alone (NH)	6	1	6	0.32%	0.06%	0.33%
Other race alone (NH)	1	4	3	0.05%	0.22%	0.17%
Mixed race or Multiracial (NH)	53	52	125	2.84%	2.92%	6.95%
Hispanic or Latino (any race)	130	206	243	6.97%	11.58%	13.52%
Total	1,865	1,779	1,798	100.00%	100.00%	100.00%

=== 2020 census ===
As of the 2020 census, Tuolumne City had a population of 1,798, with a population density of 763.2 inhabitants per square mile (294.7/km^{2}). The median age was 41.8 years. For every 100 females, there were 95.0 males, and for every 100 females age 18 and over, there were 88.9 males age 18 and over.

The age distribution was 404 people (22.5%) under the age of 18, 118 people (6.6%) aged 18 to 24, 464 people (25.8%) aged 25 to 44, 470 people (26.1%) aged 45 to 64, and 342 people (19.0%) who were 65 years of age or older.

The census reported that 1,775 people (98.7% of the population) lived in households, 23 (1.3%) lived in non-institutionalized group quarters, and no one was institutionalized. There were 749 households, out of which 219 (29.2%) had children under the age of 18 living in them. Of all households, 38.6% were married-couple households, 19.8% were households with a male householder and no spouse or partner present, and 31.0% were households with a female householder and no spouse or partner present. About 32.3% of all households were made up of individuals, and 17.0% had someone living alone who was 65 years of age or older. The average household size was 2.37. There were 434 families (57.9% of all households).

There were 838 housing units at an average density of 355.7 units per square mile (137.3 units/km^{2}), of which 749 (89.4%) were occupied and 89 (10.6%) were vacant. Of the occupied units, 397 (53.0%) were owner-occupied, and 352 (47.0%) were occupied by renters. The homeowner vacancy rate was 3.8% and the rental vacancy rate was 5.6%.

0.0% of residents lived in urban areas, while 100.0% lived in rural areas.

Racial composition as of the 2020 census
Race	Number	Percent
White	1,403	78.0%
Black or African American	6	0.3%
American Indian and Alaska Native	85	4.7%
Asian	14	0.8%
Native Hawaiian and Other Pacific Islander	6	0.3%
Some other race	68	3.8%
Two or more races	216	12.0%

=== Income and poverty ===
In 2023, the US Census Bureau estimated that the median household income was $60,694, and the per capita income was $31,932. About 0.0% of families and 4.9% of the population were below the poverty line.

=== 2010 census ===
At the 2010 census Tuolumne had a population of 1,779. The population density was 753.2 inhabitants per square mile (290.8/km^{2}). The racial makeup of Tuolumne was 1,547 (87.0%) White, 13 (0.7%) African American, 83 (4.7%) Native American, 12 (0.7%) Asian, 1 (0.1%) Pacific Islander, 50 (2.8%) from other races, and 73 (4.1%) from two or more races. Hispanic or Latino of any race were 206 people (11.6%).

The census reported that 1,768 people (99.4% of the population) lived in households, 11 (0.6%) lived in non-institutionalized group quarters, and no one was institutionalized.

There were 758 households, 223 (29.4%) had children under the age of 18 living in them, 297 (39.2%) were opposite-sex married couples living together, 95 (12.5%) had a female householder with no husband present, 52 (6.9%) had a male householder with no wife present. There were 70 (9.2%) unmarried opposite-sex partnerships, and 6 (0.8%) same-sex married couples or partnerships. 239 households (31.5%) were one person and 107 (14.1%) had someone living alone who was 65 or older. The average household size was 2.33. There were 444 families (58.6% of households); the average family size was 2.93.

The age distribution was 397 people (22.3%) under the age of 18, 161 people (9.1%) aged 18 to 24, 411 people (23.1%) aged 25 to 44, 510 people (28.7%) aged 45 to 64, and 300 people (16.9%) who were 65 or older. The median age was 41.4 years. For every 100 females, there were 91.3 males. For every 100 females age 18 and over, there were 87.5 males.

There were 840 housing units at an average density of 355.6 per square mile, of the occupied units 396 (52.2%) were owner-occupied and 362 (47.8%) were rented. The homeowner vacancy rate was 3.6%; the rental vacancy rate was 4.7%. 987 people (55.5% of the population) lived in owner-occupied housing units and 781 people (43.9%) lived in rental housing units.

== Government ==
In the California State Legislature, Tuolumne is in the 4th senatorial district, represented by Republican Marie Alvarado-Gil, and in the 8th Assembly district, represented by Republican David Tangipa.

In the United States House of Representatives, Tuolumne is in California's 5th congressional district, represented by Republican Tom McClintock.

== Notable people ==
- Bobby Adams, Major League Baseball player, was born in Tuolumme.
- Lord Buckley was born in Tuolumne and worked there as a logger.

== In popular culture ==
The Sheriff of Tuolumne (1911) was a short made by the Selig Polyscope Company. It starred Hobart Bosworth and Bessie Eyton and was directed by Francis Boggs.

In 1951, scenes of the western High Noon, starring Gary Cooper, were filmed in Tuolumne. Cooper's Will Kane went to St. Joseph's Church to solicit help from the townspeople.

Location filming for the movie Silver City (1951) occurred in Tuolumne.

The town is featured prominently in the Highway To Heaven 1985 TV episode "Plane Death".

== California Historical Landmark ==
Summersville is a California Historical Landmark. California Historical Landmark number 407 reads:

NO. 407 SUMMERSVILLE (TUOLUMNE) - The area's first non-Indian settlers, the Franklin Summers family, arrived in 1854 and built a log cabin a half mile west of this spot, the geographical center of East Belt Placer Gold Rush from 1856 to 1857. In 1858, James Blakely discovered the first quartz lode half a mile east of here and named it 'Eureka.' The mine became the nucleus of the town of Summersville, which was later called Carters and finally became Tuolumne. Other mining towns lively in gold rush days were Long Gulch, two miles south, and Cherokee, two miles north.

== See also ==
- California Historical Landmarks in Tuolumne County, California
- Cherokee, Tuolumne County, California
