= Corlieu Falls =

Waterfall in Madera County, California

- Interactive map of Corlieu Falls
- Location: Sierra National Forest, Madera County.
- Coordinates: 37°24′58″N 119°37′29″W
- Type: Tiered
- Watercourse: Lewis Creek

Corlieu Falls is a waterfall on Lewis Creek in the Sierra National Forest, near Sugar Pine in Madera County, California. The falls are named for Charles Clifford Corlieu, who lived near the site in the early 20th century. They are located along the Lewis Creek National Recreation Trail, which is accessible from California State Route 41.

In the 1980s, a proposed hydroelectric project that would have diverted water above the falls was opposed by environmental groups and the Chukchansi and became the subject of federal litigation.

== History ==
Cliff Corlieu, local poet circa 1910

The falls are named for Charles Clifford Corlieu, who moved from Missouri to California in the early 1870s and later ranched in the Auberry area. In later years, while visiting one of his daughters at Sugar Pine, Corlieu became interested in the warm mineral springs along Lewis Creek. He filed mineral claims on nearby land and built a cabin overlooking the falls, adopting the nickname "Cliff Man". He also piped water from the springs into a large pothole in the rock to create a bathing pool.

Corlieu published Sierra Sanctum: Written Reveries of a Cliff Man, a collection of poetry inspired in part by his life in the Sierra Nevada, in 1926. He died in Fresno County in 1929.

In 1931, Corlieu's daughter Anel Corlieu Mortensen received a Forest Service permit for a residence near the falls, followed by a special-use permit to operate a resort in 1937. The resort included cabins, tent platforms, and a bathhouse beside a natural pool supplied by a warm spring. In November 1939, Mortensen sold her interest in the improvements to S. C. Ramage, who received a new Forest Service permit for the resort in January 1940.

A dispute over the property followed. Mortensen asserted rights under a mining claim originally filed by her father in 1919, while Samuel L. Mobley filed another mining claim covering the property in 1940. The federal government sued to establish its title to the land and prevent Mortensen and Mobley from interfering with Forest Service permittees. In United States v. Mobley (1942), the federal district court found that no valuable mineral discovery had been established and that the improvements at the site had been constructed principally for recreational rather than mining purposes. The court rejected the mining claims and barred Mortensen and Mobley from asserting rights to the property against the federal government or its permittees.

Mobley later operated a museum and restaurant near the trail, and additional cabins and homes were built in the surrounding area. The structures were removed in the 1960s and the site was allowed to return to a natural state.

=== Proposed hydroelectric project ===
A hydroelectric project was proposed for Lewis Fork Creek in the early 1980s. In 1982, Dale L. R. Lucas applied to the Federal Energy Regulatory Commission (FERC) for a preliminary permit to develop a small hydroelectric facility on the creek. In March 1984, Lucas, president of Alternative Energy Resources, applied for a license to construct and operate the Lewis Fork Creek hydroelectric project in the Sierra National Forest.

The proposed project included a diversion dam above Corlieu Falls, a 6,000-foot (1,800 m) pipeline, a 1,000-foot (300 m) penstock, and a powerhouse with a generating capacity of 3.7 megawatts. Electricity would have been transmitted to the Pacific Gas and Electric Company system. FERC issued a license for the project in August 1987.

The project was challenged by the California Save Our Streams Council, the Sierra Club, and the Chukchansi Yokotch Tribe of Madera County. The groups challenged the Forest Service's approval under the National Environmental Policy Act and the American Indian Religious Freedom Act, raising concerns about the project's environmental effects and its effect on sites important to the Chukchansi.

Congress subsequently restricted development of the project. In 1987, it prohibited the Forest Service from authorizing land disturbance at the site until studies were completed on the project's effects on the aesthetics and flow of Corlieu Falls and on nearby hot springs considered sacred by the Chukchansi. The legislation required findings that the project would not substantially affect the flow at the falls or have a substantial adverse effect on the hot springs. The restriction was repeated in subsequent appropriations acts through 1991.

The dispute also reached the federal courts. In California Save Our Streams Council, Inc. v. Yeutter (1989), the Ninth Circuit held that the federal district court lacked jurisdiction over the challenge because the Federal Power Act placed review of FERC licensing decisions in the federal courts of appeals.

== Lewis Creek National Recreation Trail ==
Corlieu Falls is located along the Lewis Creek National Recreation Trail, a 3.7-mile (6.0 km) trail in the Sierra National Forest. The trail was designated as part of the National Recreation Trails System in 1982 and has trailheads at its northern, central, and southern sections.

Much of the trail follows the route of a former lumber flume operated by the Madera Sugar Pine Company. The flume carried sawn lumber from the company's mill at Sugar Pine to the railroad at Madera.
