= Madera Sugar Pine Company =

Defunct logging company in Madera County, California, US

The Madera Sugar Pine Company
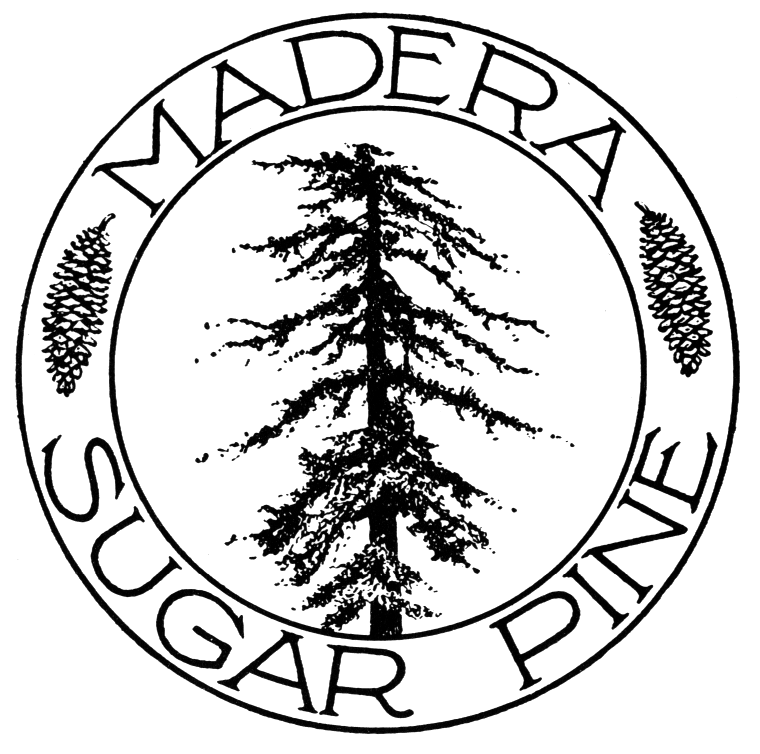

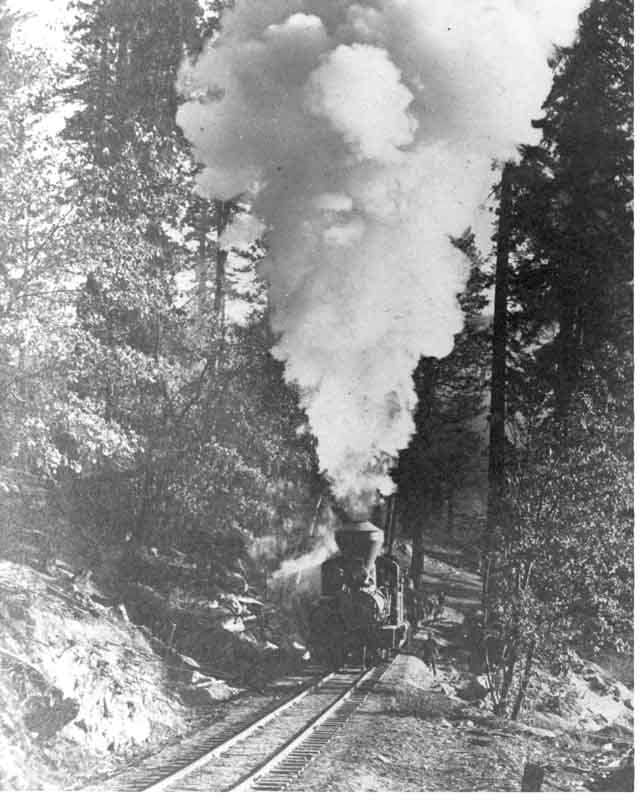
- Hauling logs near Sugar Pine in 1915

Overview
- Locale: Sierra National Forest
- Dates of operation: 1874–1931
- Successor: Yosemite Mountain Sugar Pine Railroad (1961)

Technical
- Track gauge: 3 ft (914 mm)
- Length: 32 mi (51 km)

The Madera Sugar Pine Company was a United States lumber company that operated in the Sierra Nevada region of California during the late 19th and early 20th centuries. The company distinguished itself through the use of innovative technologies, including the southern Sierra's first log flume and logging railroad, along with the early adoption of the Steam Donkey engine. Its significant regional impact led to the establishment of towns such as Madera, Fish Camp, and Sugar Pine, as well as the growth of Fresno Flats and the formation of Madera County.

At its peak, the Madera Sugar Pine Company employed over 600 men in its logging operations, another 1,000 in its lumber mill, and produced an annual output of 50 million board feet of lumber. Most of its production was exported beyond California, notably supplying two carloads of "the finest Sugar Pine in the world" for the reconstruction of the White House under Theodore Roosevelt. Overall, the company logged more than 6,200 acres (25 km^{2}) acres and generated over 1.3 billion board feet of lumber before its closure in 1933, a downturn driven by the declining supply and demand during The Great Depression. Despite these economic challenges, the Madera Sugar Pine Company maintained profitability in each year of its operation.

A key moment for the company was its involvement in a landmark 1923 U.S. Supreme Court case where the court confirmed death benefits for non-resident alien dependents, marking a major step in workers' rights and setting a precedent against discrimination in cases of industrial accidents.

In 1967, service resumed as the Yosemite Mountain Sugar Pine Railroad, a heritage railway. The railroad is built on a two-mile (3 km) section of the original railroad grade used between 1908 and 1924.

== Predecessors ==
=== The California Lumber Company (1874–1878) ===
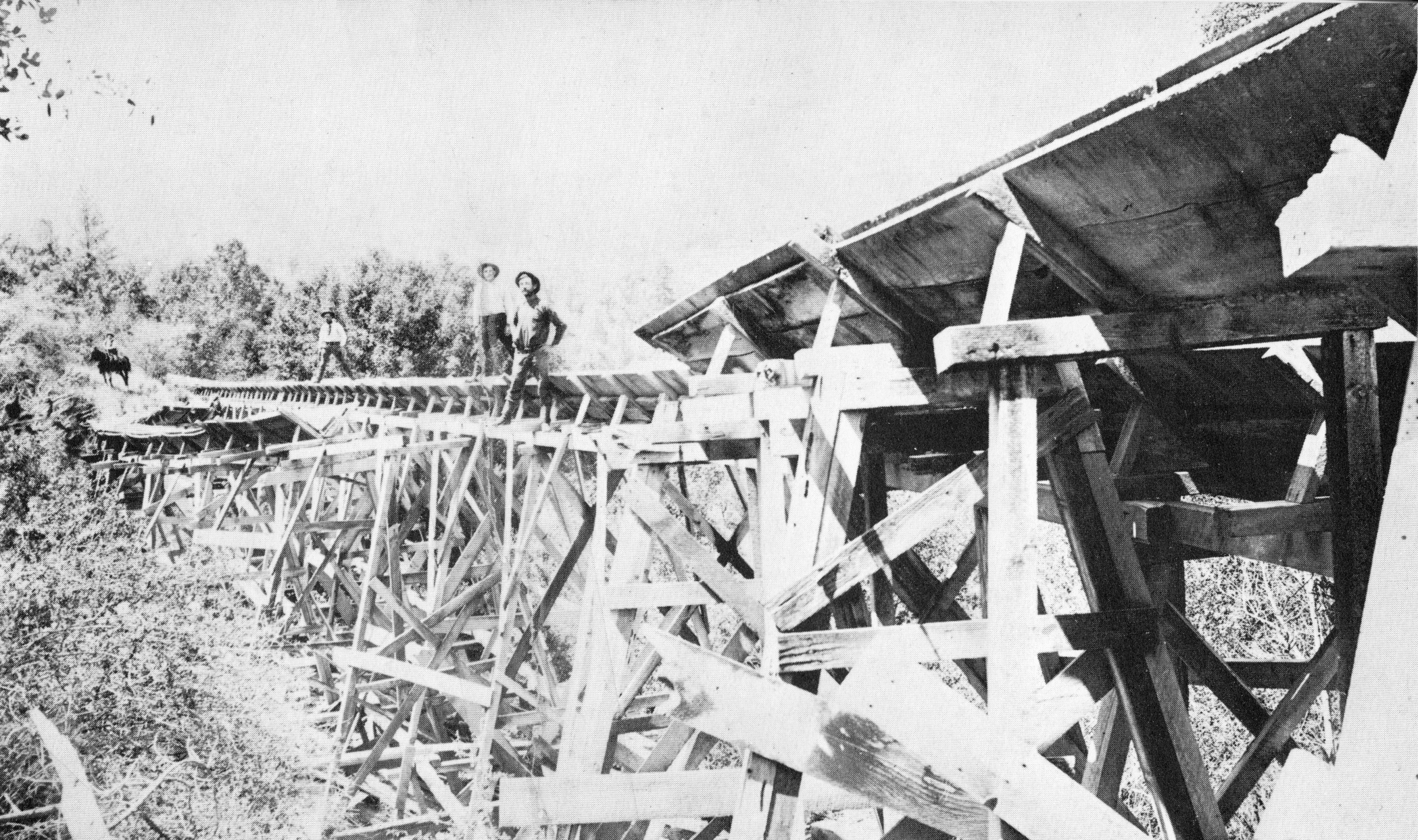
The original Madera log flume.

The California Lumber Company was founded in February 1874, initiating an ambitious project to move lumber from the Sierra Nevada to the new railroad in the San Joaquin Valley. This extensive project required setting up lumber camps and mills in the mountains and building a log flume to transport the lumber from higher elevations to the valley.

Between 1874 and 1877, a 54-mile (87 km) log flume, the longest ever built at that time, was constructed to transport rough-cut lumber from the mountains to Madera in the valley. There, it could be finished and shipped worldwide via the Southern Pacific Railroad. This project involved constructing many high trestles across the variable foothills' terrain and was finished at a cost of $250,000, ready for the 1877 season.

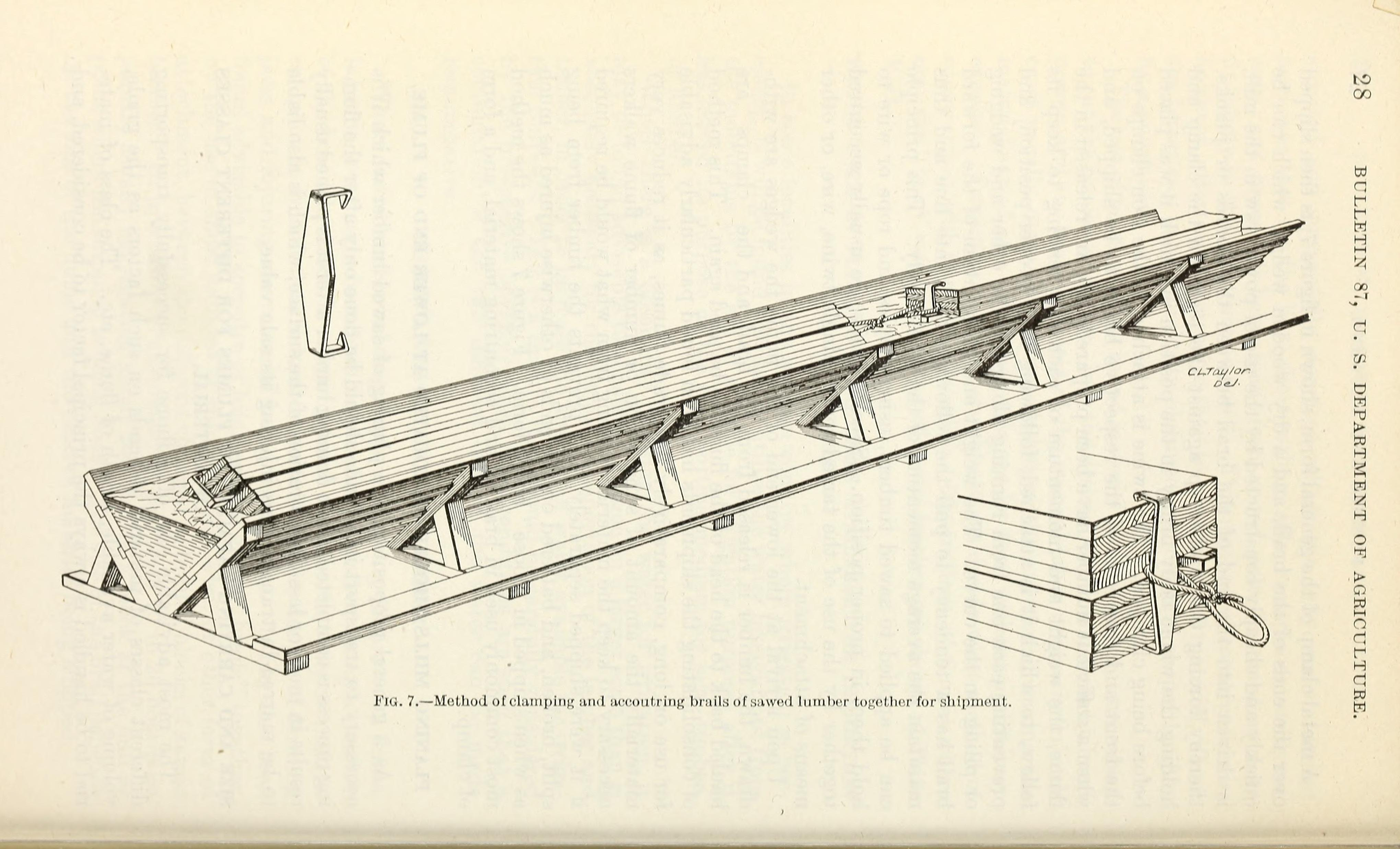
Rough sawn lumber clamped into bundles and lashed together in a flume train.

Facing the problem of lumber slipping over the sides of the flume, William Thurman, one of the company’s co-founders, developed a new technique to clamp bundles of lumber together, enhancing their stability during transport. His invention, known as the flume clamp, was patented in 1877 and effectively reduced the risk of losing lumber and damaging the flume. His flume clamp was patented in 1877.

However, despite these innovations, the California Lumber Company encountered financial challenges. Lack of sufficient funds and the 1877 drought significantly affected its operations, resulting in the termination of the company's activities after only three seasons.

=== The Madera Flume and Trading Company (1878–1899) ===
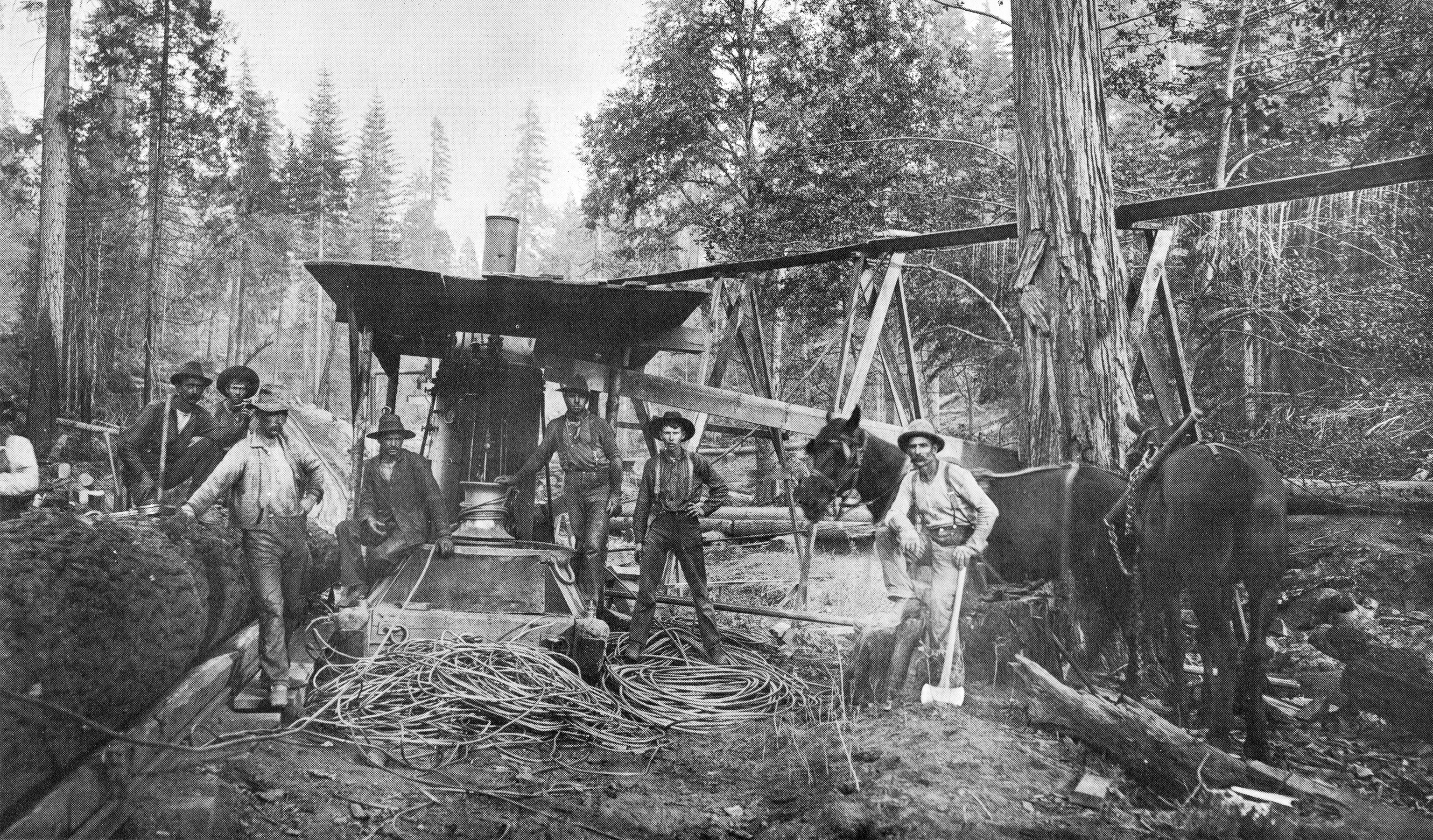
A Dolbeer single-spool donkey rig and logging crew near Nelder Grove in sometime after 1881.

In 1878, the California Lumber Company underwent a major overhaul and was rebranded as the Madera Flume and Trading Company. This new entity expanded its operations by adding a four-mile narrow gauge railway connecting the Soquel Mill with the flume, facilitating the transport of timber from more remote locations.

In the late 1880s, the Madera Flume and Lumber Company made history by being the first logging operation to swap traditional oxen teams for steam-powered donkey engines. These compact yet potent steam engines allowed loggers to cut and transport trees under any weather conditions, thereby boosting overall timber production throughout the year.

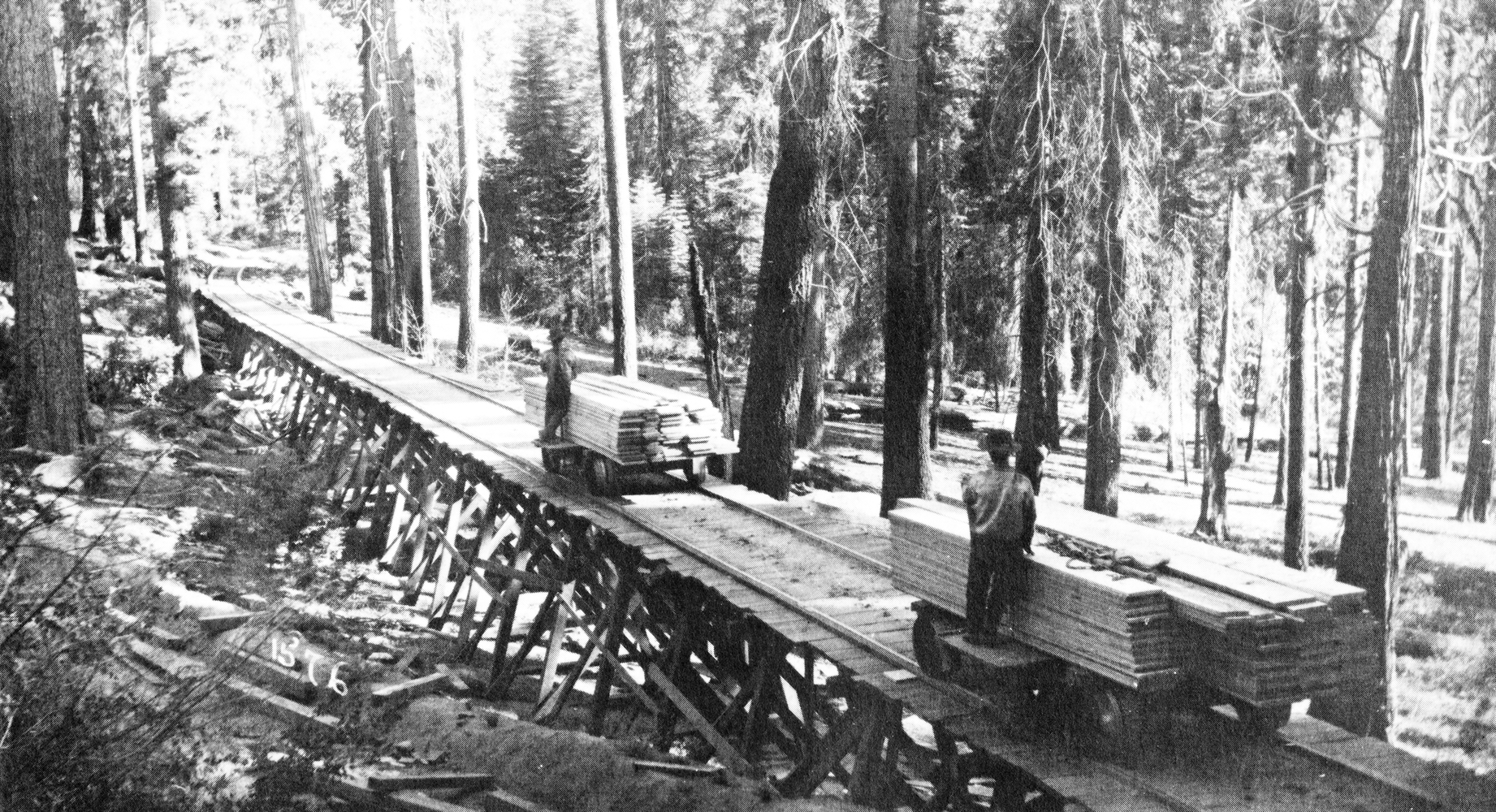
A gravity tramway carries lumber to the Soquel log flume.

In 1881, the company constructed the Soquel Mill and connected it to an extended log flume, positioned upstream from the original California Mill. The following year, they established a second mill near Nelder Grove. However, this new mill did not have a nearby water source, necessitating the use of a forest tramway to move the lumber to the flume. By then, the company had the capability to transport 100,000 board feet of finished lumber to Madera daily.

In 1889, the company introduced Betsy, a unique four wheeled, geared steam locomotive. She was the first of her kind to operate in the southern Sierra Nevada and represented a significant advancement in logging techniques and efficiency. The Visalia Weekly Delta reported on the innovation.

Logging on the Madera Flume and Trading Company has been greatly facilitated this season by a new narrow-gauge (3-foot) railroad. Cars especially made for this purpose have done away with many [ox] teams in bringing lumber from the camps to the mill. Expenses at Madera and in the woods now exceed $15,000 per month – truly an enterprise of which any area might feel justly proud.

Betsy had a unique design, with a small cab that required the engineer to also serve as the fireman. Despite this quirk, Betsy became one of the longest-serving Shay locomotives in the Sierra and remained in service through the 1930s.

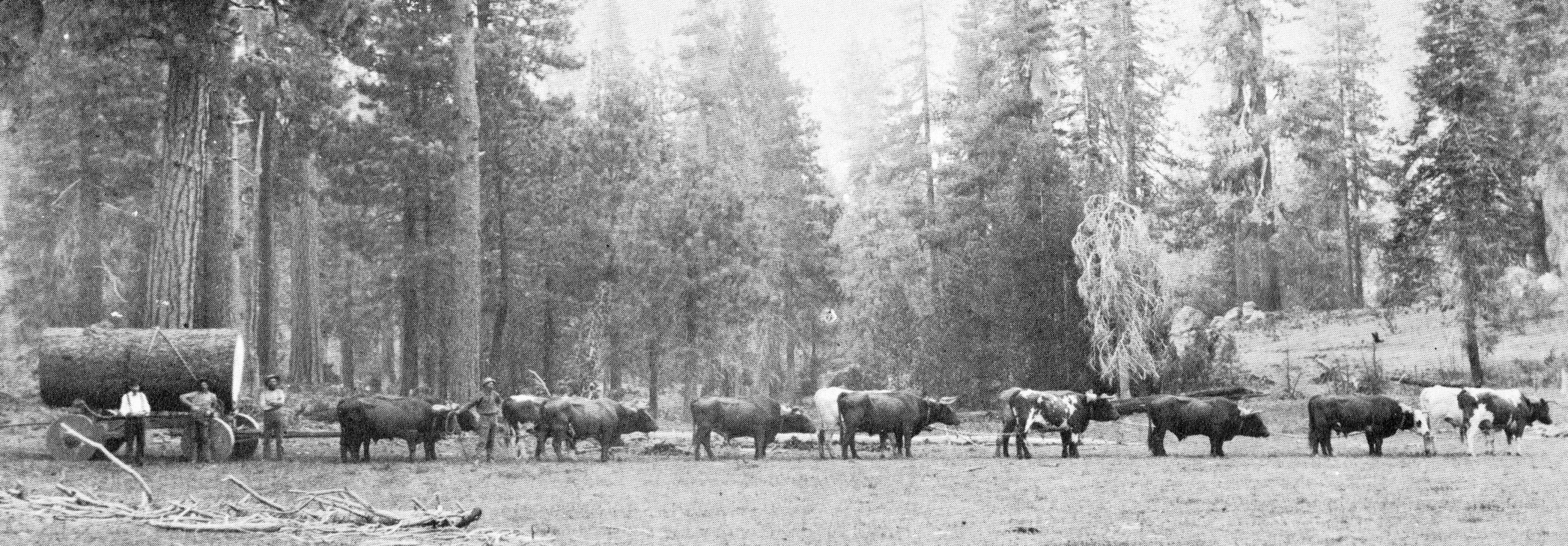
Before steam power, oxen teams were the only way to get felled logs to the mill.

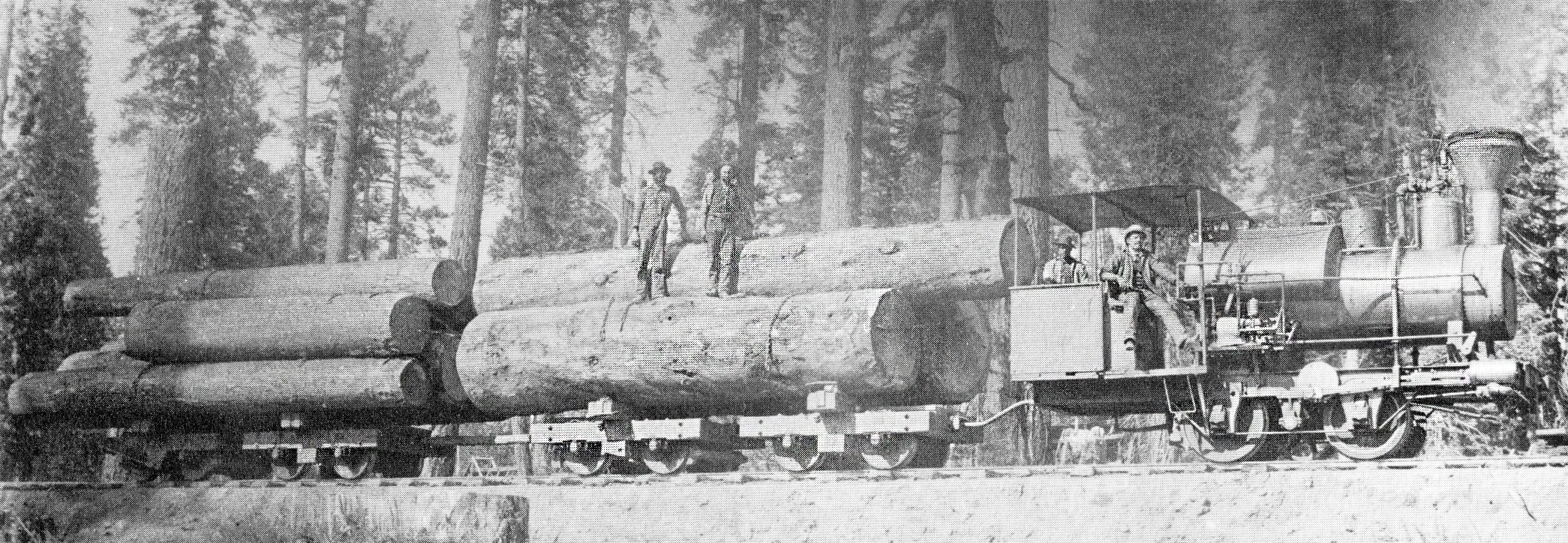
Betsy, the first locomotive in the southern Sierra, began operating in 1881.

==== Logging the Giant Sequoia ====
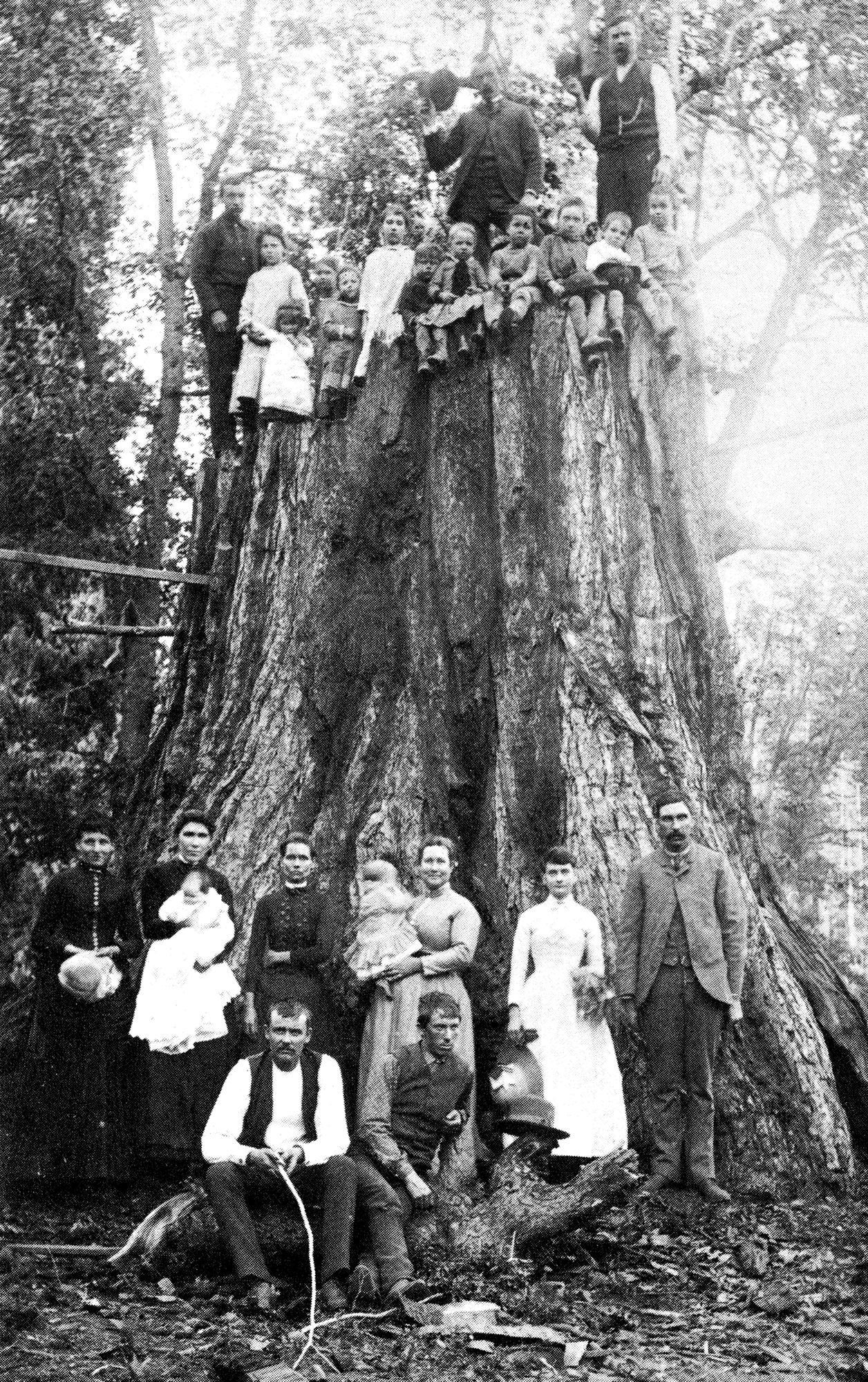
A giant Seqouia stump in Nelder Grove around 1881.

In the late 1800s, loggers in Nelder Grove cut down many giant sequoias. However, the wood from these trees had limited commercial potential due to its tendency to break apart when felled and its inferior suitability for construction compared to old-growth sugar pine and ponderosa. Despite this, more than 100 of the largest sequoias in the grove survived clearcutting by 1897.

By the late 1890s, the Madera Flume and Trading Company was in decline. The reasons were twofold: the available timber tracts were depleting, and there was a decrease in the demand for lumber exports due to a prolonged economic depression. Earlier, the California Lumber Company mills had been permanently closed, and the company itself had declared bankruptcy in 1878. Despite these setbacks, the Madera lumber yard managed to keep running, albeit on a smaller scale, supported by contracted loggers who continued to supply cut logs to the flume.

== The Madera Sugar Pine Company (1899–1931) ==
By the turn of the century, the old-growth white pine of the upper Midwest had become depleted. Sugar pine, with its large size and straight grain, became a highly valued substitute for white pine. This led many established lumber interests to push westward into the Sierra Nevada.

In 1889, Arthur Hill, a Michigan-born timber magnate, and his associates purchased the assets of the Madera Flume and Trading Company and expanded its operations. Its existing logging railroad was extended to newly secured timber tracts, and the flume to Madera was reconstructed. The scale of the operation was expanded to rival the Fresno Flume and Irrigation Company and Sanger Lumber Company, which had sprung up as competitors.

The sugar pine tree became the central symbol for the reincorporated company. It featured in the company's name and logo and became the namesake for the newly constructed company town and state-of-the-art mill.

=== Log flume reconstruction ===
A new earth dam on the Lewis Fork of the Fresno River served two purposes. It formed a log pond to serve the new Sugar Pine mill and created a water source for a new flume head. The completely rebuilt flume followed the original fifty-four miles (87 km) route through Fresno Flats, dropping a total of 4,500 feet (1,400 m) elevation on the journey to Madera. To maintain the proper grade, over 200 trestles were built, some of them 65 feet (20 m) high. The flume cost $275,000 to construct, an average of $5000 per mile. It used approximately 5,700,000 feet of redwood lumber and 2100 kegs of nails.

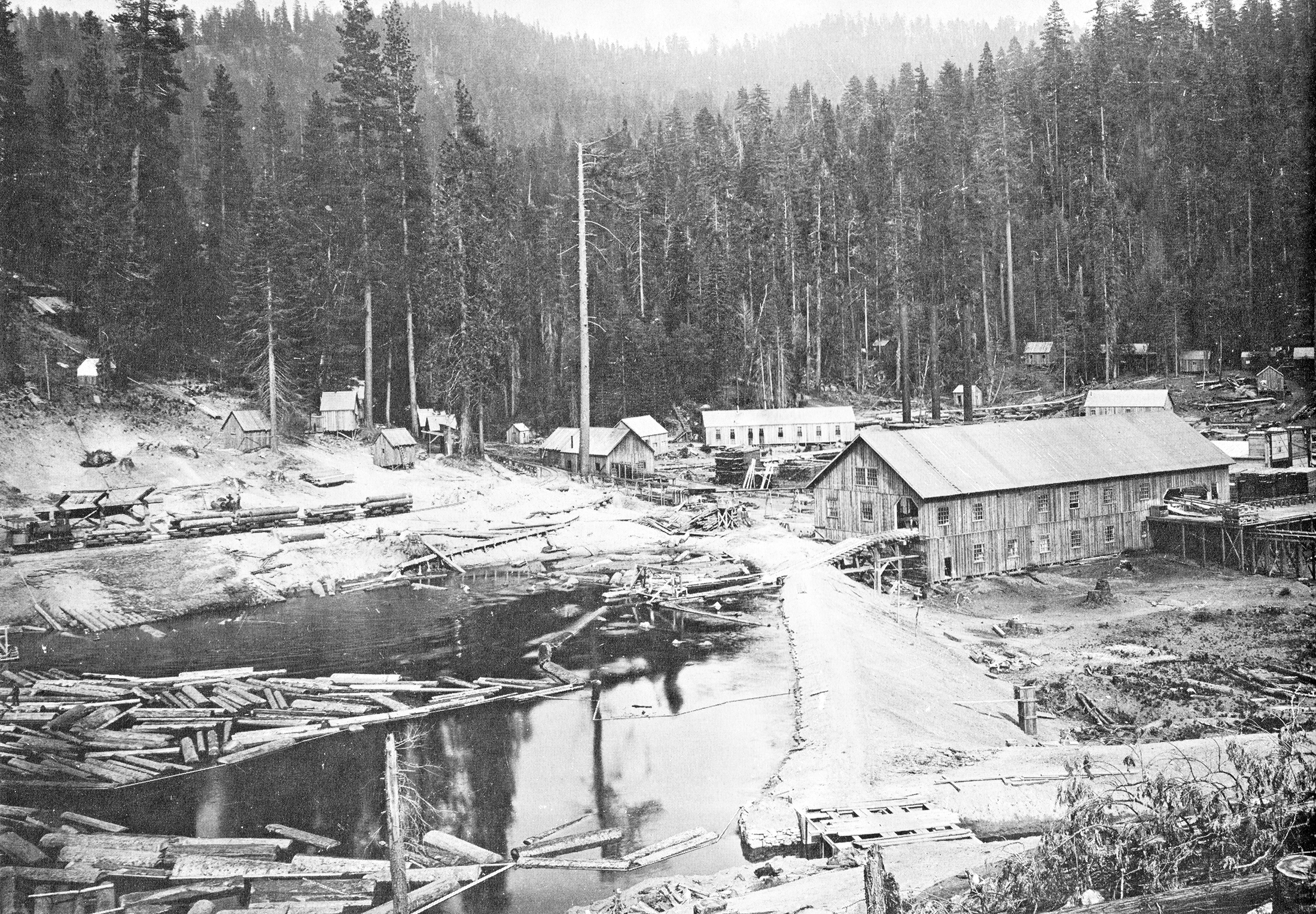
The log pond at Sugar Pine Mill.

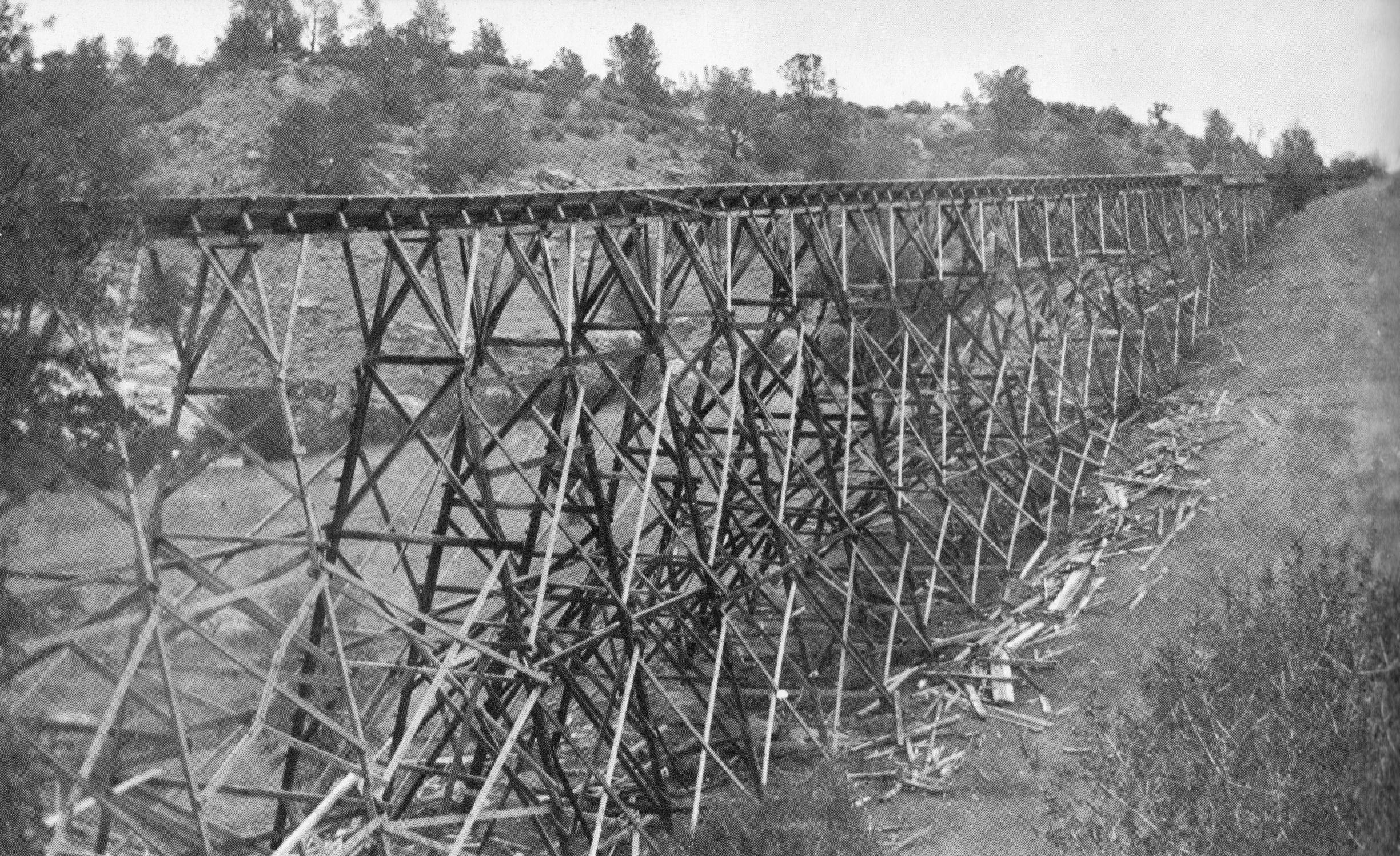
Flume trestle at the China Store grade.

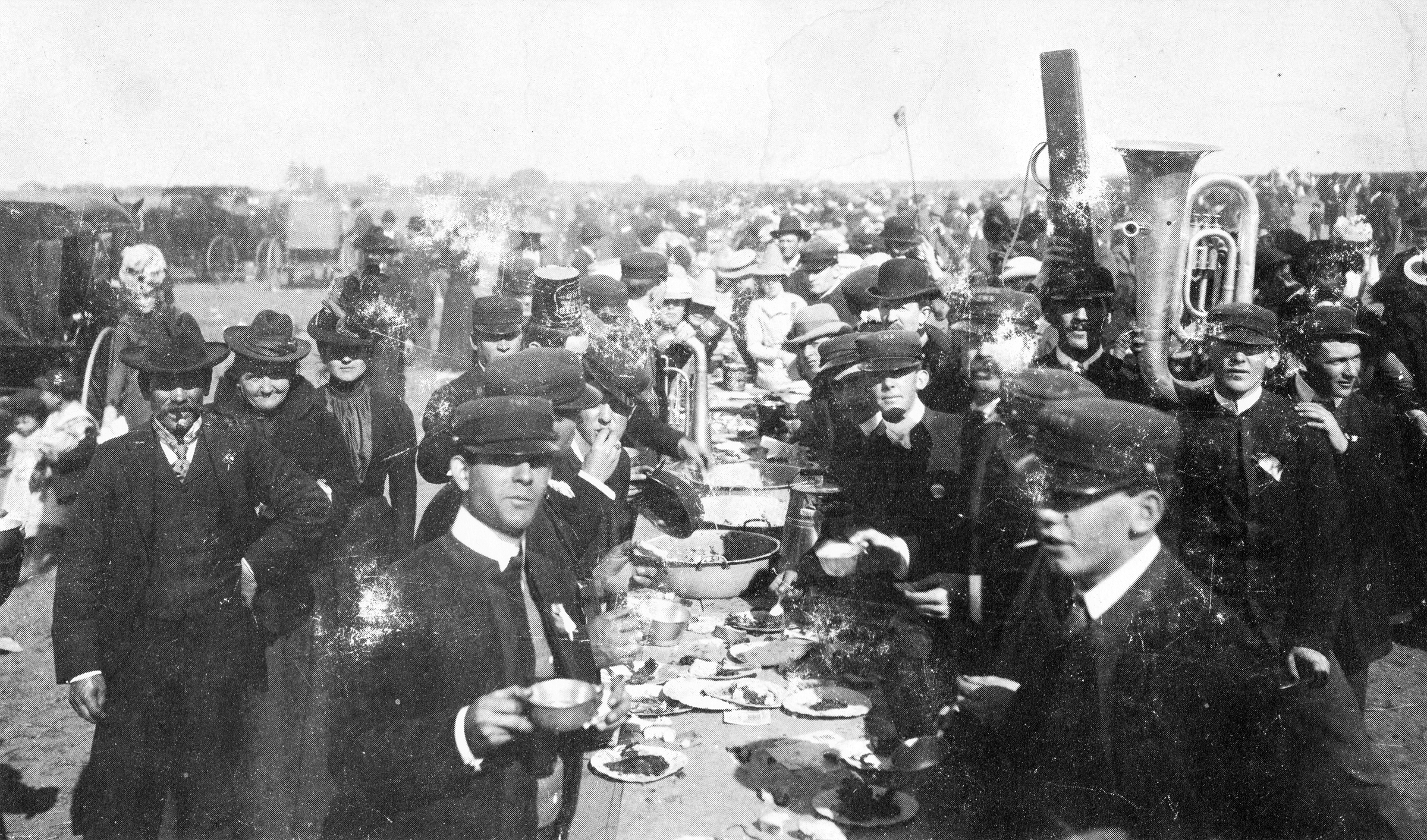
Residents of Madera celebrate the completion of the "world's longest lumber flume" on October 27, 1900.

=== 1922 Sugar Pine fire ===
A catastrophic fire swept through the town on September 9, 1922. The sawmill, lumber yard, and 75 acres (0.30 km^{2}) acres of surrounding forest were destroyed.

Madera Sugar Pine immediately announced plans to rebuild and expand. Equipment was ordered, manufactured and shipped from the eastern US by rail, including a modern two-band sawmill. Crews worked throughout the winter to transport and assemble over 500,000 pounds (230,000 kg) of equipment, hauling it over 60 miles (97 km) miles of dirt road from Madera to the mill site. Operations resumed the following April with an expanded capacity of 350,000 board feet a day.

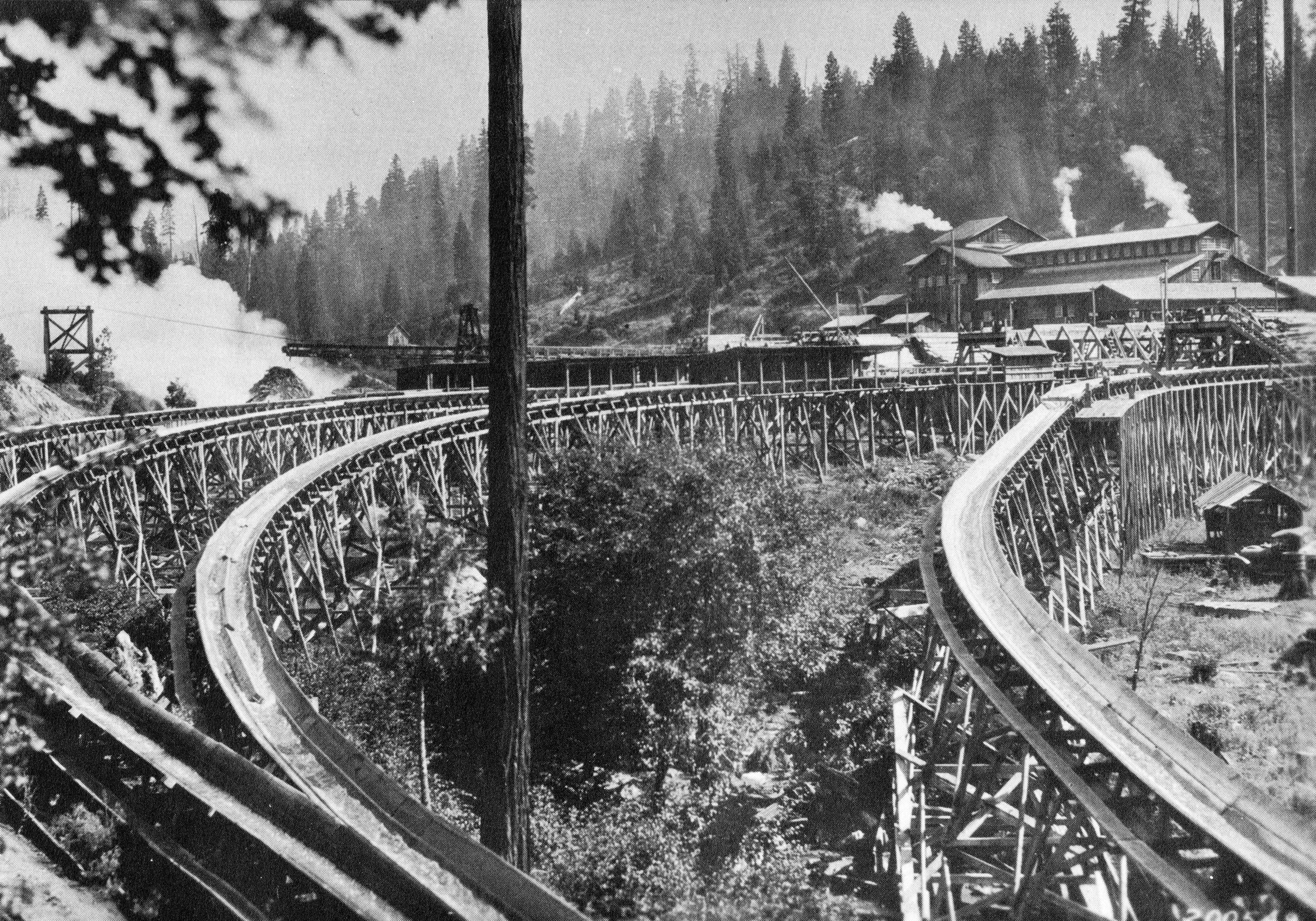
The flume complex at the second Sugar Pine Mill.

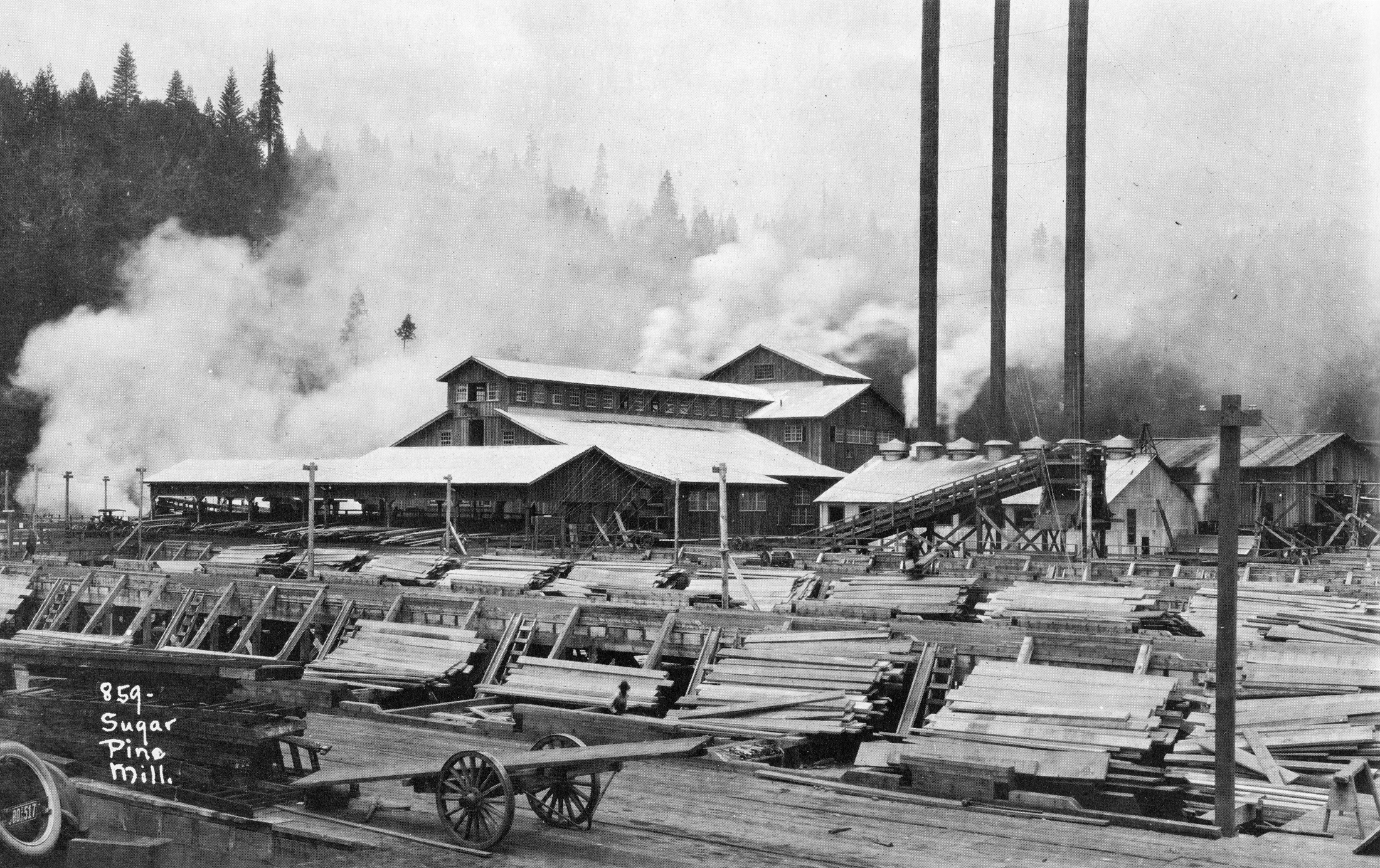
The expanded flume loading yards.

== Life and work ==
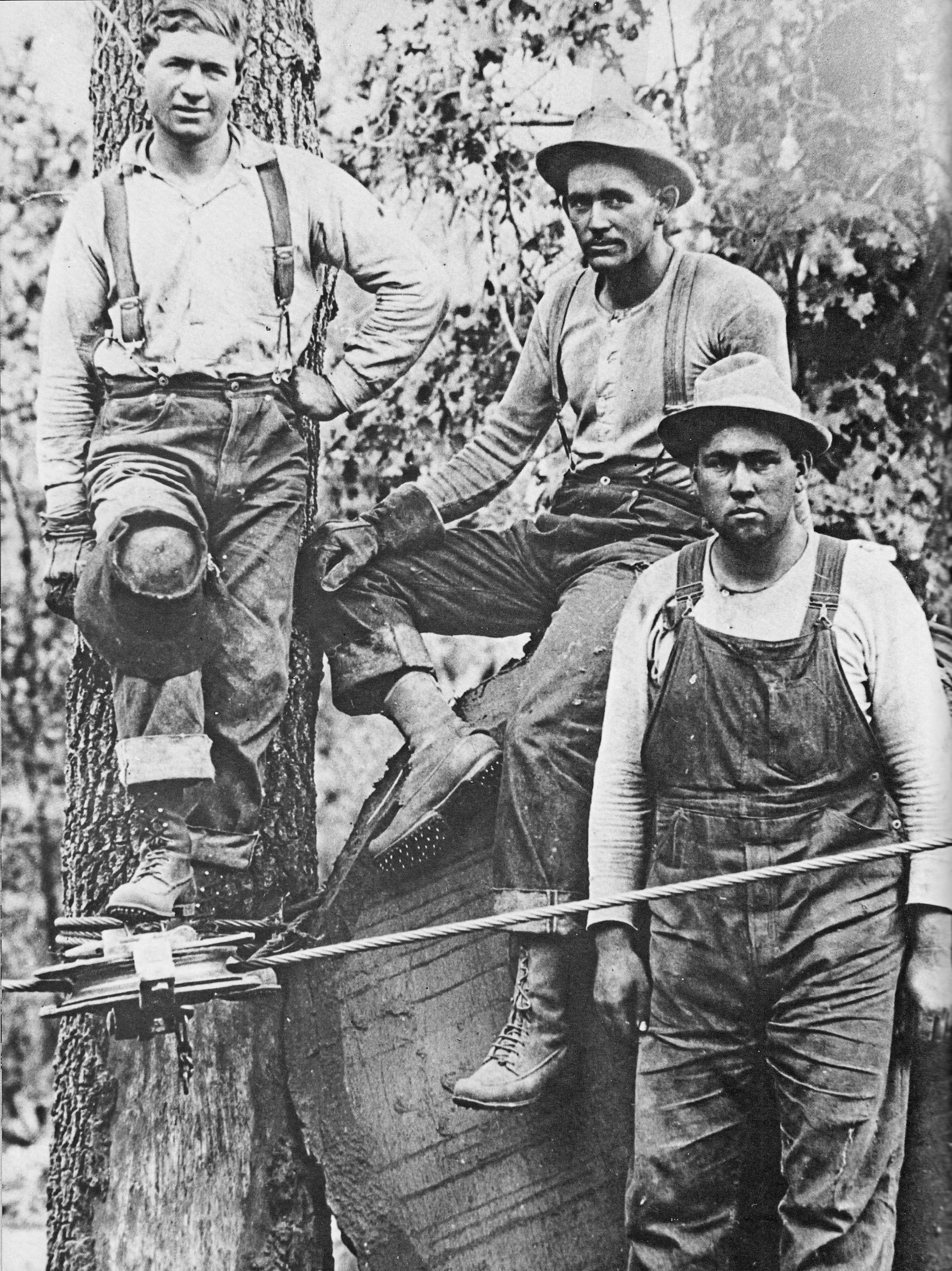
Lumberjacks in caulk boots.

The sawmill community at Sugar Pine was diverse, with workers from many different nationalities. Social status within the community was based on a person's position with the company, and housing was allocated accordingly. Management lived in the upper canyon, sawmill workers in the lower canyon, and shop workers on the side of the hill. Loggers would live in seasonal camps in the woods, where they would sleep four to a shack and eat in a common cookhouse. Chinese laborers, whose jobs were limited to the flume, drying yard and sawmill, lived in a separate Chinatown area south of the mill.

=== Chinese Labor ===
Chinese workers, many of whom had arrived during the California Gold Rush, played a significant role in completing the Madera Flume and filling many of the jobs in the Sugar Pine lumber yards. However, these Chinese workers faced significant discrimination and segregation in the workplace and in their daily lives. They were relegated to low-paying jobs as common laborers, were hired and paid through a middleman, and lived in a separate Chinatown apart from the rest of the community. Anti-Chinese sentiment and lack of legal protection also hindered the Chinese workers' experience, particularly in the wake of the Chinese Exclusion Act.

In 1922, Madera Sugar Pine decided to replace these Chinese laborers with Mexican laborers who had become readily available following the Immigration Act of 1917. In a move that would send a clear signal that Chinese workers were no longer welcome, the company set fire to Chinatown at the end of the logging season, waiting until the first snowfall to ensure that no other structures would be damaged in the blaze. This incident highlights the discrimination and injustice faced by Chinese workers in the logging industry during the early 20th century.

=== Sex Work ===
Prostitution flourished in the Sierra during the logging days. The San Francisco fire of 1906 left many sex workers without work, so they went to the logging camps. Law enforcement left them be, and they traded at the company store and received medical care at the company hospital. They accepted all customers, showing no discrimination beyond the ability to pay.

The first brothel for the loggers of Madera Sugar Pine Company was called Kamook, located four miles from Sugar Pine. Tipperary was the most popular. Named after the popular song, Tipperary featured a main parlor house and four individual cabins. Accommodations at Kamook were scarce, so the sex workers set up a tent community called "Happy Camp" two miles away in Fish Camp, California. Business boomed, and the sex workers soon hired carpenters to construct a permanent brothel.

Prostitution houses stood for just over twenty years, Tipperary being the first to fall when the logs near Big Creek were depleted and the logging moved on. Happy Camp and Kamook persisted until the 1920s.

=== Supreme Court case ===
In the 1923 case Madera Sugar Pine Co. v. Industrial Accident Commission of California, the United States Supreme Court upheld death benefits to the non-resident alien dependents of employees who died as a result of no-fault industrial accidents. The decision upheld the Workmen's Compensation Act of California, which was found to not be in violation of the U.S. Constitution. The ruling required that the Madera Sugar Pine Company compensate the partially dependent survivors of two Mexican laborers who had died on the job. This case established the legal principle that non-resident alien dependents are entitled to the same compensation as citizens under the state's worker's compensation laws.

== Liquidation ==
The mill at Sugar Pine ceased activity in November 1931 with wood piling up in the Madera lumber yard due to the Great Depression. With the economic situation showing no signs of improvement by 1933, the flume, lumber yard, planing mill and box factory were permanently closed. Every locomotive was sold or scrapped.

== Locomotive Roster ==
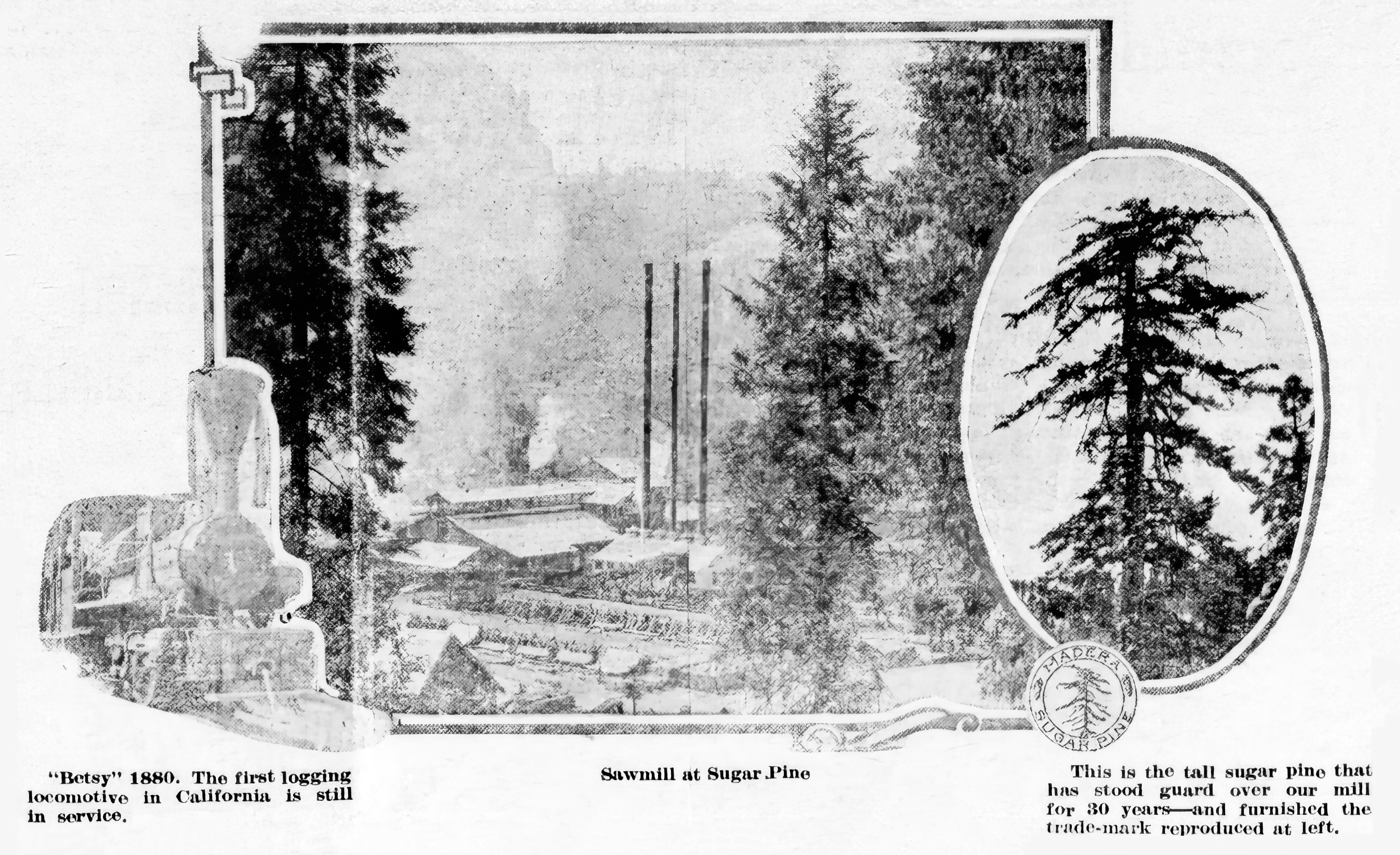
Betsy was a mascot for the company and featured in its advertising.

The Madera Sugar Pine Company (MSP) managed a fleet of seven locomotives. Four of these engines were named, while the others were known by numbers. The first engine, known as Betsy or Engine Number One, was an early model that became a reliable part of the fleet, serving until the early 1930s despite its unique design requiring the engineer to also act as the fireman.

Betsy stood out for its durability and became one of the longest-serving logging locomotives in the Sierra Nevada, even though it had a tendency to derail occasionally.

The company's larger locomotives, Engines 4 and 5, were delivered through a considerable effort involving transport by the San Joaquin Valley and Yosemite Railroad to Raymond and then by mule teams to the Sugar Pine mill, approximately 30 miles (48 km) miles away.

Operationally, Engines 2, 3, and 4 typically moved 15 empty log cars from the sawmill to the logging areas. The larger Engines 5 and 6, with three trucks each, could pull 22 empty log cars. The capacity of the trains was largely dictated by the steepness of the railroad grade. Notably, the Shay locomotives were designed to be adaptable, never needing to be turned around; they were always positioned with the front end facing uphill, highlighting their flexibility in handling the rugged terrain.

In 1933, the sawmill closed, and the company chose to dismantle the railroad in 1934, marking the end of an era for the Madera Sugar Pine Company, and all the engines were sold and scrapped by 1937.

Name	Builder	Type	Date	Shop number	Notes
Betsy	Unknown	0-4-0T Geared locomotive	Unknown	Unknown	The No. 1 engine, named Betsy, was the first steam locomotive to operate in the Southern Sierra. Despite its unconventional and early design, it remained in constant service until the MSP ceased operations in the early 1930s. Unlike the other MSP locomotives, it never received a painted-on title.
Arthur Hill	Lima Locomotive Works	Two truck Shay locomotive	December 27, 1902	755	The Arthur Hill was built for Madera Sugar Pine Company with a fuel capacity of 1.5 cords of wood, water capacity of 1,560 gallons and an empty weight as built of 64,000 pounds. Delivered in Madera. It was scrapped in 1937.
E.M. Fowler	Lima Locomotive Works	Two truck Shay locomotive	February 27, 1904	862	The E.M. Fowler was built for Madera Sugar Pine Company with a fuel capacity of 1.5 cords of wood, water capacity of 1,560 gallons and an empty weight as built of 70,950 pounds. Delivered in Madera. It was scrapped in 1937.
E.N. Briggs	Lima Locomotive Works	Two truck Shay locomotive	1910	2280	The E.N. Briggs was built for Madera Sugar Pine Company with an empty weight as built of 84,000 pounds. Delivered in Raymond. It was scrapped in 1937.
Madera Sugar Pine Company #5	Lima Locomotive Works	Three truck Shay locomotive	1912	2617	Built for Madera Sugar Pine Company with an empty weight of 120,000 pounds. Delivered in Raymond. Sold to Diamond & Caldor for parts in 1937 for $500.
Madera Sugar Pine Company #6	Lima Locomotive Works	Three truck Shay locomotive	1927	3306	Built for Madera Sugar Pine Company with an empty weight of 135,500 pounds. Delivered in Raymond. Sold to Feather River Lumber Company in 1935. Converted to oil burner. Sold to Hyman-Michaels Company in San Francisco, 1943. Sold to Michigan-California Lumber Company (3rd No. 6) in 1944. Scrapped in 1951.
Madera Sugar Pine Company #7	Plymouth	Gas Mechanical, 4 wheel, 20 Ton	1927	Unknown	Sold to Grants Gravel Company in Friant, California and converted to standard gauge.

Locomotives of The Madera Sugar Pine Company

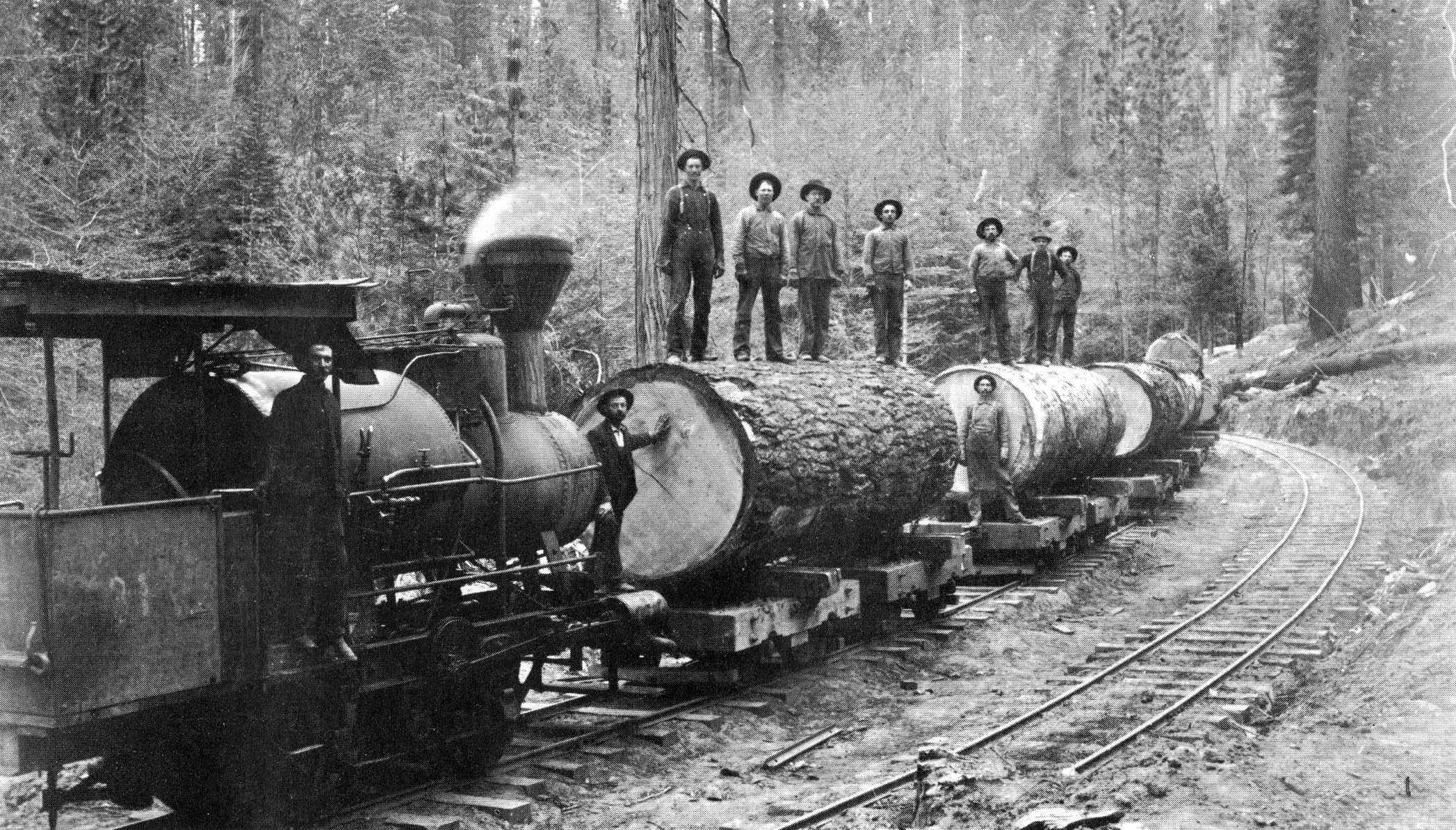
Betsy and a short log train

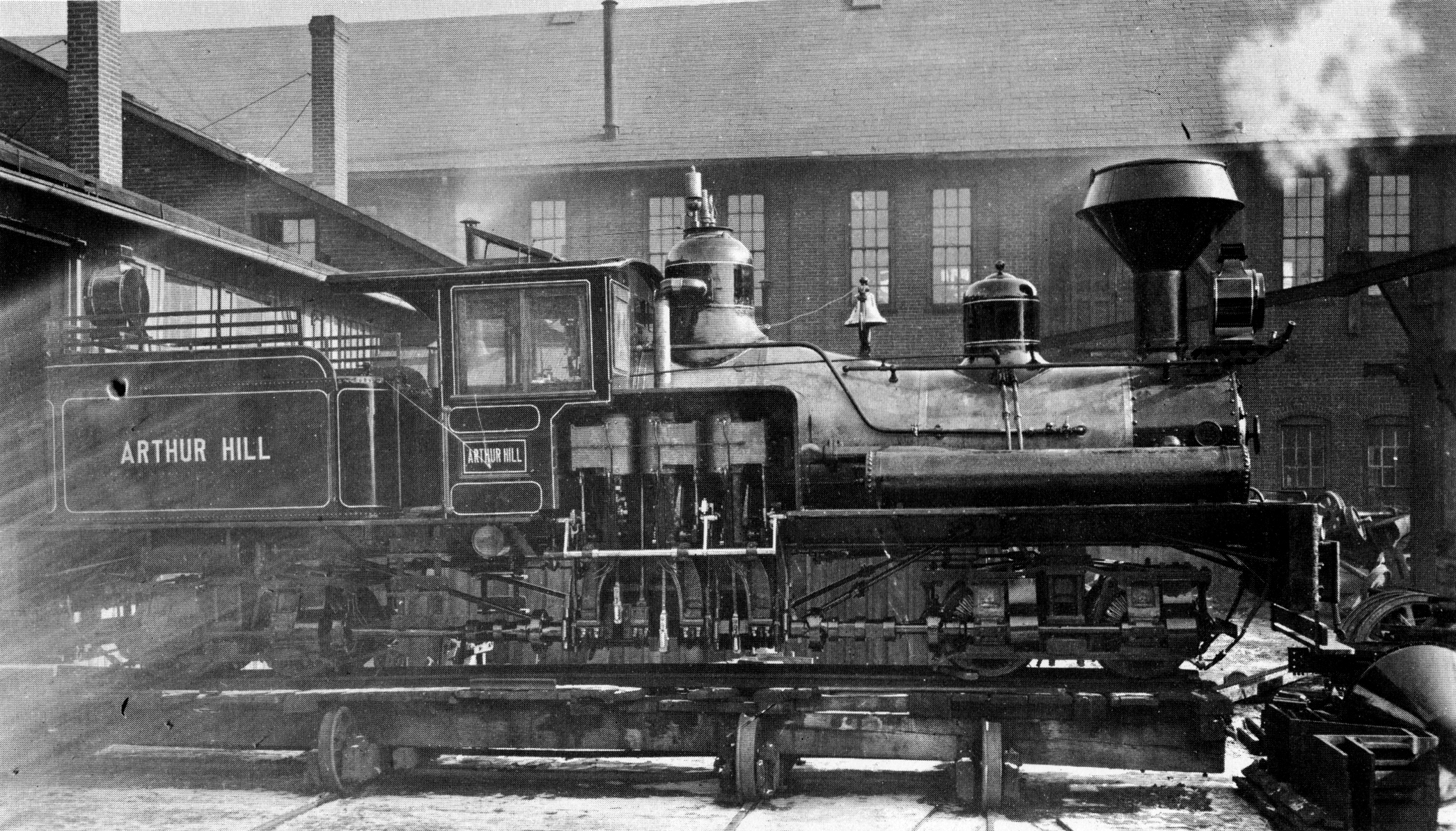
Arthur Hill at the Lima Locomotive Works.

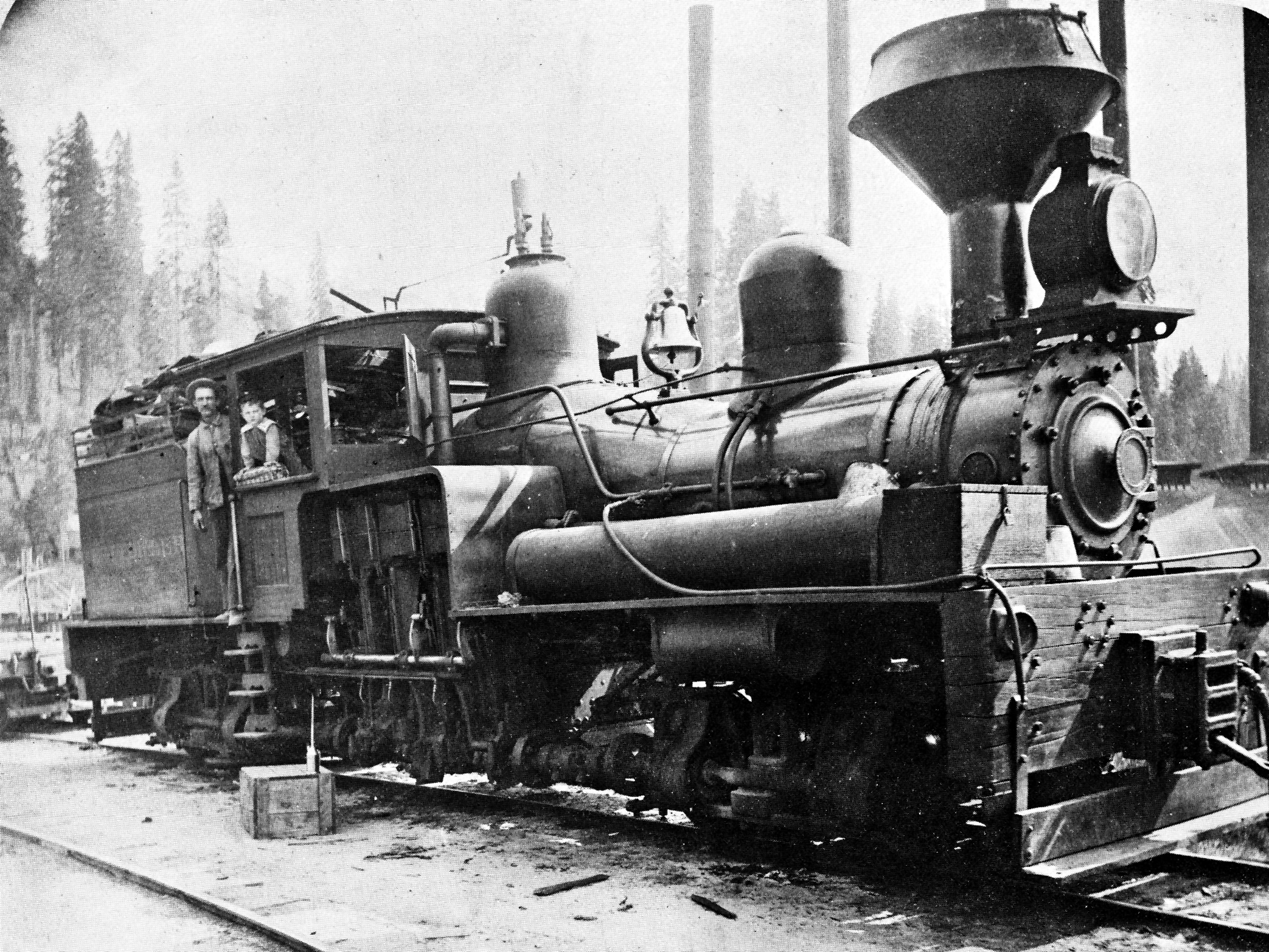
E.M. Fowler arrives at Sugar Pine.

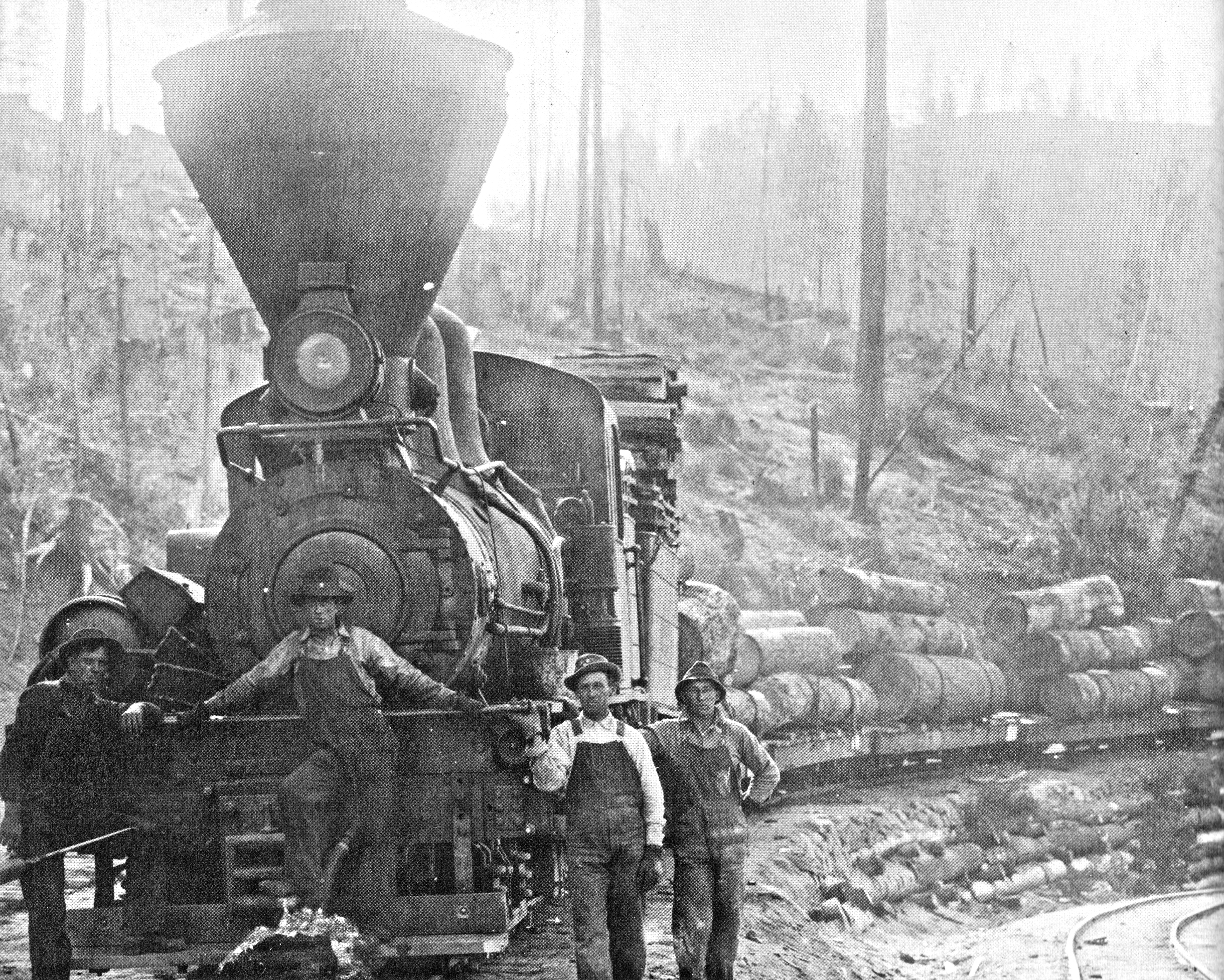
No. 5 and a load of pine logs in 1918.

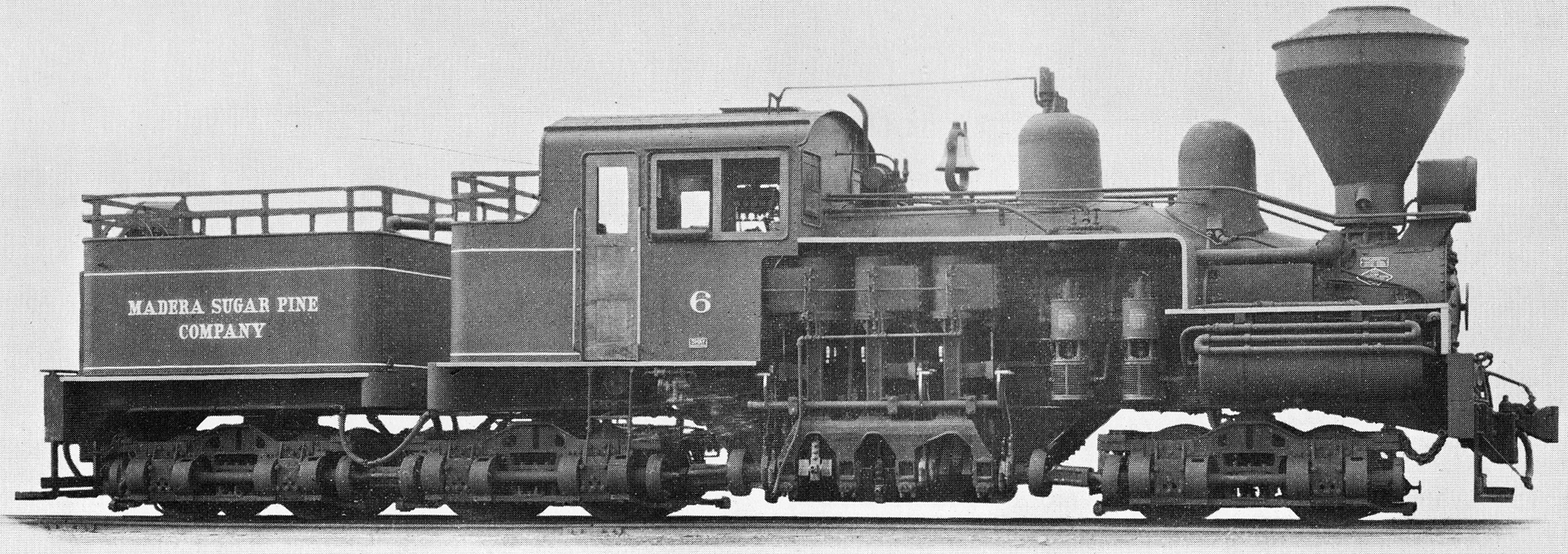
Builder's photo of No. 6.

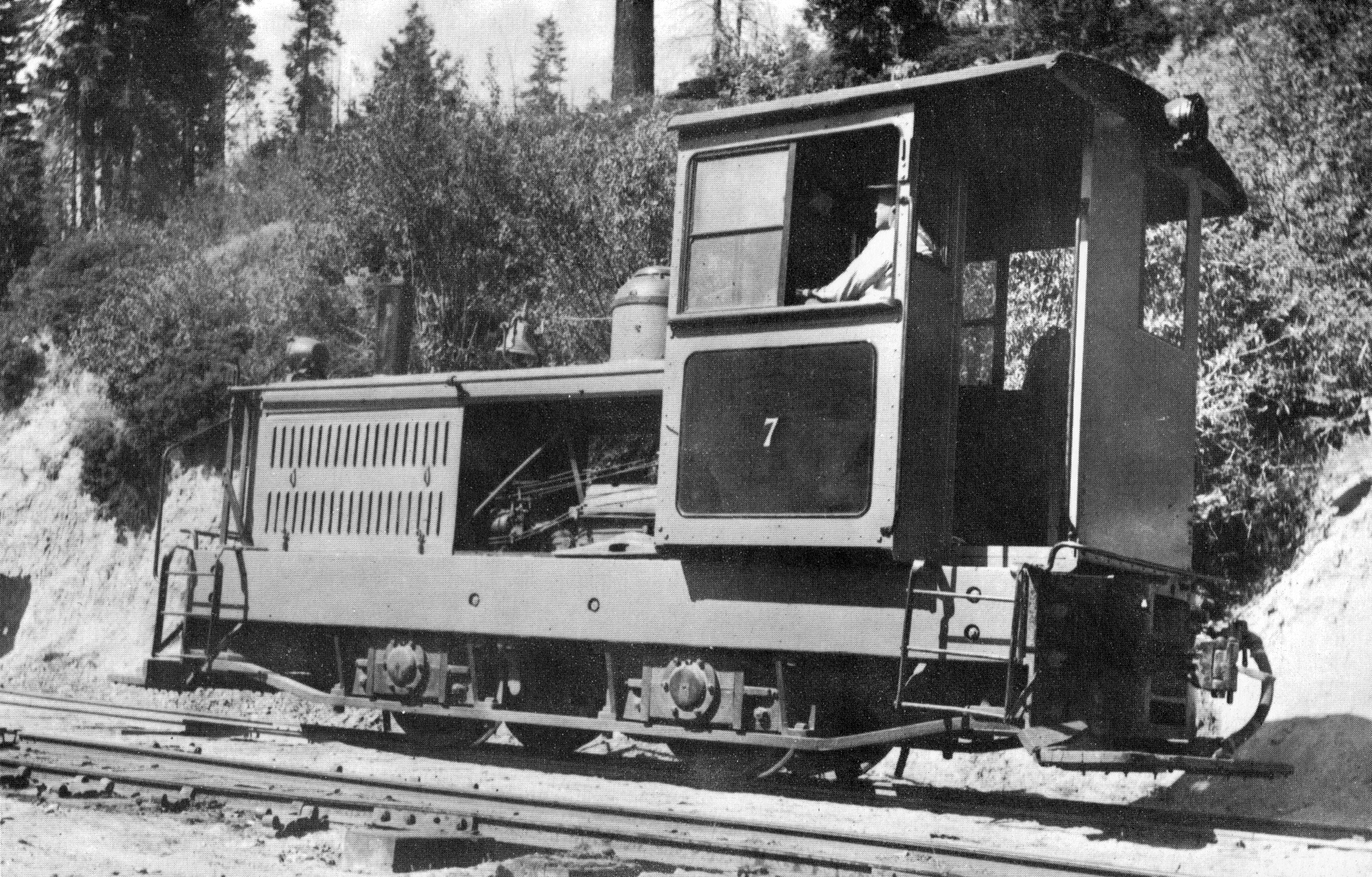
No. 7 was the first gas-mechanical engine used by Madera Sugar Pine.

== Yosemite Mountain Sugar Pine Railroad ==
In 1967, service resumed as the Yosemite Mountain Sugar Pine Railroad, a heritage railway. The railroad is built on a two-mile (3 km) section of the original railroad grade used between 1908 and 1924.
