= Shoe studs =

Shoe studs may refer to:

- Caulkin (UK) or calks (US) on a horseshoe
- Cleats on a human shoe
- The sole studs of Caulk boots, which are similar to cleats.
- Hobnail, special nails driven into the smiles of boots or other footwear to increase traction and improve durability.
