= Caulk boots =

Rugged boots designed for safety

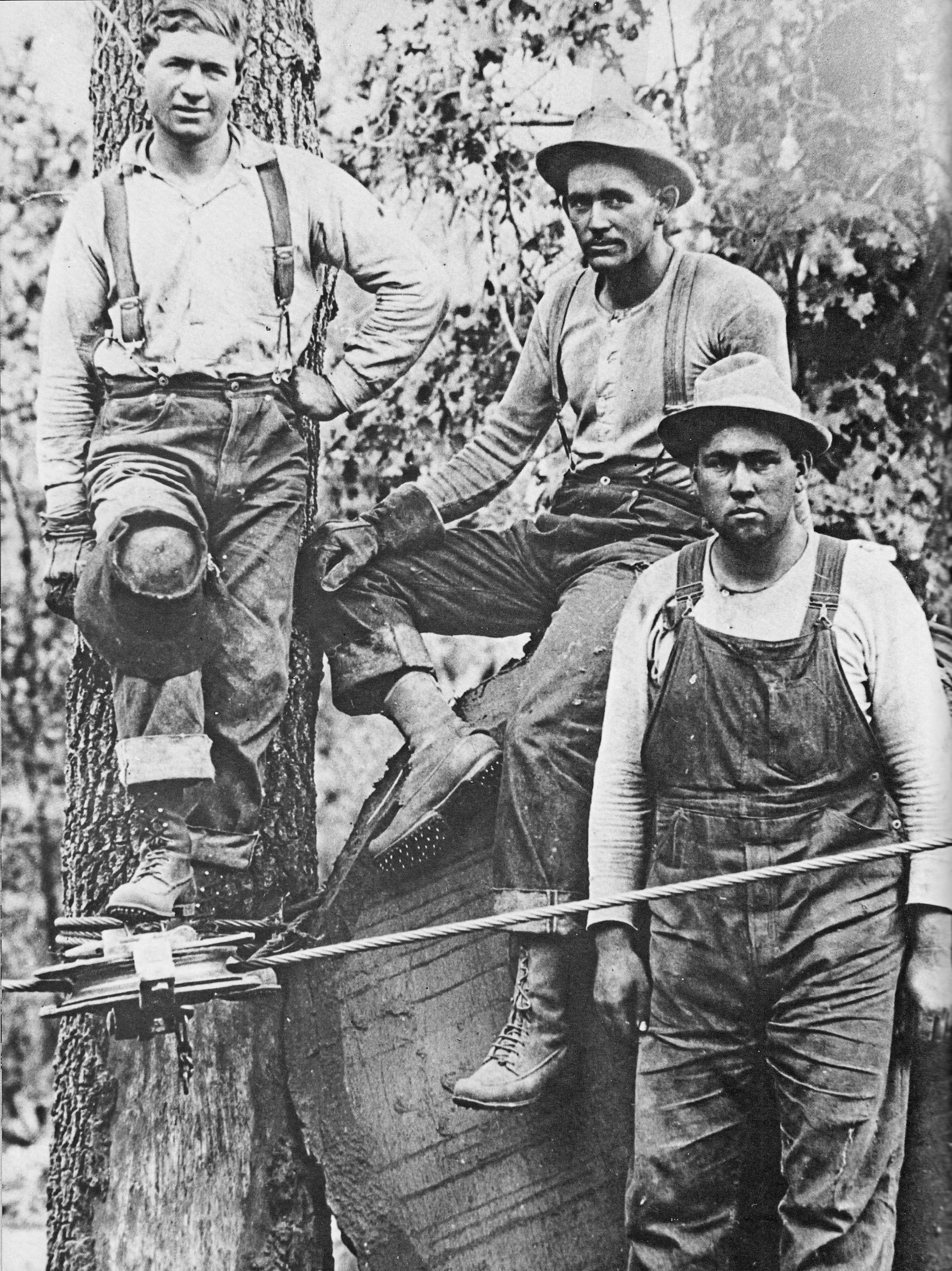
Madera Sugar Pine Company loggers wearing caulked boots in the Sierra Nevada (1927)

Caulk boots or calk boots (also called cork boots, timber boots, logger boots, logging boots, or corks) are a form of rugged spike-soled footwear that are most often associated with the timber industry. They are worn for traction in the woods and were especially useful in timber rafting. These boots were part of the traditional lumber worker's basic equipment, along with axe, peavey, and crosscut saw.

Caulk boots are distinguished by their soles' steel spikes (calks) added for traction. They are typically made of leather or rubber uppers extending over the ankle, with a thick rubber sole. Ceramic calks are also available and have been reported to be less prone to wear and damage than steel. In spite of their cost (often more than $400, as of 2015), caulk boots are usually the preferred footwear of experienced forest workers because of improved safety by reducing slips, trips, and falls when workers are traversing through logging slash, especially during wet weather.

== See also ==
- List of boots
- List of shoe styles
- Shoe studs (disambiguation)
