= Sugar Pine, California =

Unincorporated community in California, United States

Sugar Pine
- Unincorporated community
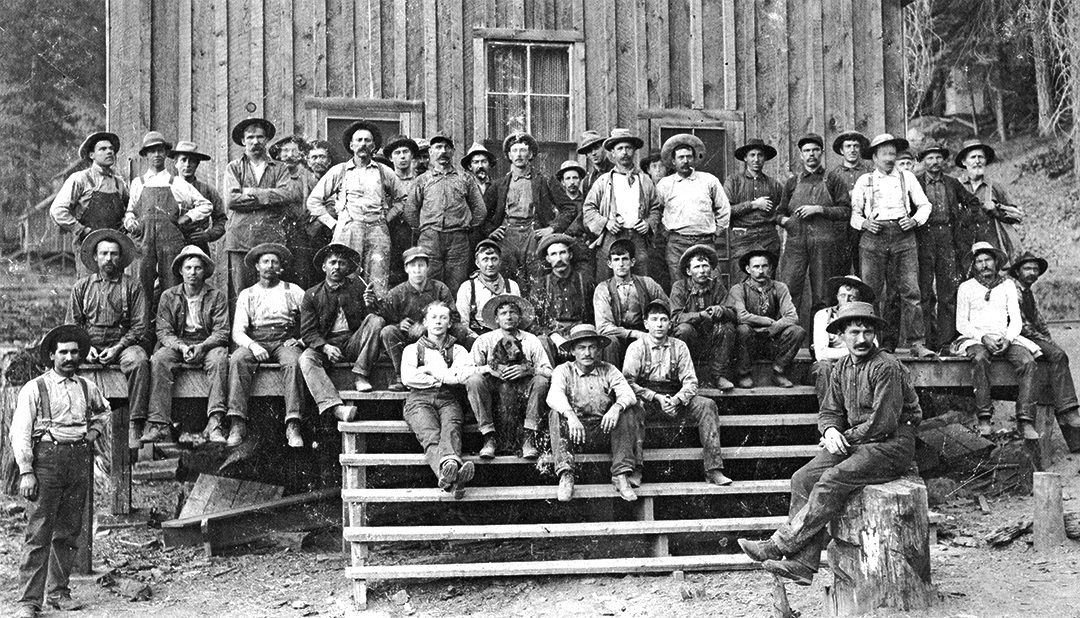
- Loggers in Sugar Pine, California, 1920s.

- Location in California Sugar Pine (the United States)
- Coordinates: 37°26′28″N 119°38′04″W
- Country: United States
- State: California
- County: Madera
- Elevation: 4,236 ft (1,291 m)

Sugar Pine is an unincorporated community in Madera County, California, United States. It is located 5 miles (8 km) north of Yosemite Forks, at an elevation of 4236 feet (1291 m). It is located one mile east of California State Route 41, between Oakhurst, California and the South Entrance of Yosemite National Park.

Sugar Pine was built by the Madera Sugar Pine Company in 1899 to 1900. The company which had an extensive logging operation in the area between the 1890s and 1931. The mill pond and some service buildings are all that remain of the mill. The company housing units, over the years updated, are still in use today as residences and vacation homes.

A post office operated at Sugar Pine from 1907 to 1934.

== History ==
Although the Sugar Pine area attracted gold prospectors during the California Gold Rush (the nearby Coarse Gold Gulch saw a short-lived boom in 1850), the settlement of Sugar Pine itself grew out of a turn-of-the-century logging enterprise. In the 1870s, entrepreneurs led by William H. Thurman built a massive log flume (over 50 miles long) to transport timber from the high Sierra down to a new rail terminus named Madera (“wood”), inaugurating large-scale lumber operations in the region. The California Lumber Company’s flume opened in 1876, but the company went bankrupt by 1878; it was reorganized as the Madera Flume and Trading Company, which continued sending lumber to Madera into the 1890s.

In 1899, the Madera Sugar Pine Company was established by new investors (including Michigan lumbermen) and built a large modern sawmill and company town at Sugar Pine, about a mile off the main Yosemite road near the park’s south entrance. The Sugar Pine community—complete with a company store, school, post office (opened 1907), and worker housing—became the hub of one of California’s largest lumber operations in the early 20th century. The old flume was rebuilt and extended to carry cut lumber from Sugar Pine to Madera, now spanning roughly 60 miles; in October 1900, residents held a grand celebration to mark the completion of what was touted as the world’s longest lumber flume.

By the 1910s and 1920s, the Sugar Pine mill was producing tens of millions of board feet of lumber per year and employed hundreds of men in the woods and at the mill. A significant portion of the workforce were Chinese immigrant laborers, who lived in a segregated “Chinatown” below the mill. By 1922, however, the company shifted to hiring Mexican workers and—citing unsanitary conditions—intentionally burned down the Sugar Pine Chinatown that January under the cover of heavy snow. Ironically, just eight months later in September 1922, a catastrophic forest fire swept through Sugar Pine, destroying the sawmill, lumber yard, and roughly 75 acres of surrounding timber, and leaving hundreds homeless (with damages estimated at $2.1 million).

The town was quickly rebuilt: portable sawmill rigs, new buildings, and supplies were brought in, and full operations resumed by early 1923. Sugar Pine thrived again through the late 1920s—in 1928 the mill was cutting about 300,000 board feet of lumber per day and nearly 1,000 men worked between the logging camps and the mill. The onset of the Great Depression, however, devastated the lumber market: the last log was cut at Sugar Pine in November 1931, and the mountain mill camp shut down permanently soon thereafter. (The company’s finishing mill in Madera operated a bit longer.) The Sugar Pine post office closed in 1934, and the once-bustling camp faded into a near ghost town.

In subsequent decades, many of the old company cabins were renovated as private vacation homes, and the Sugar Pine area remained a small unincorporated community. The legacy of its logging era is commemorated by local historical markers and the Yosemite Mountain Sugar Pine Railroad, a heritage steam train launched in 1967 that carries tourists over a portion of the old logging railroad route.

== Notable people ==
- Charles Clifford Corlieu

== Gallery ==
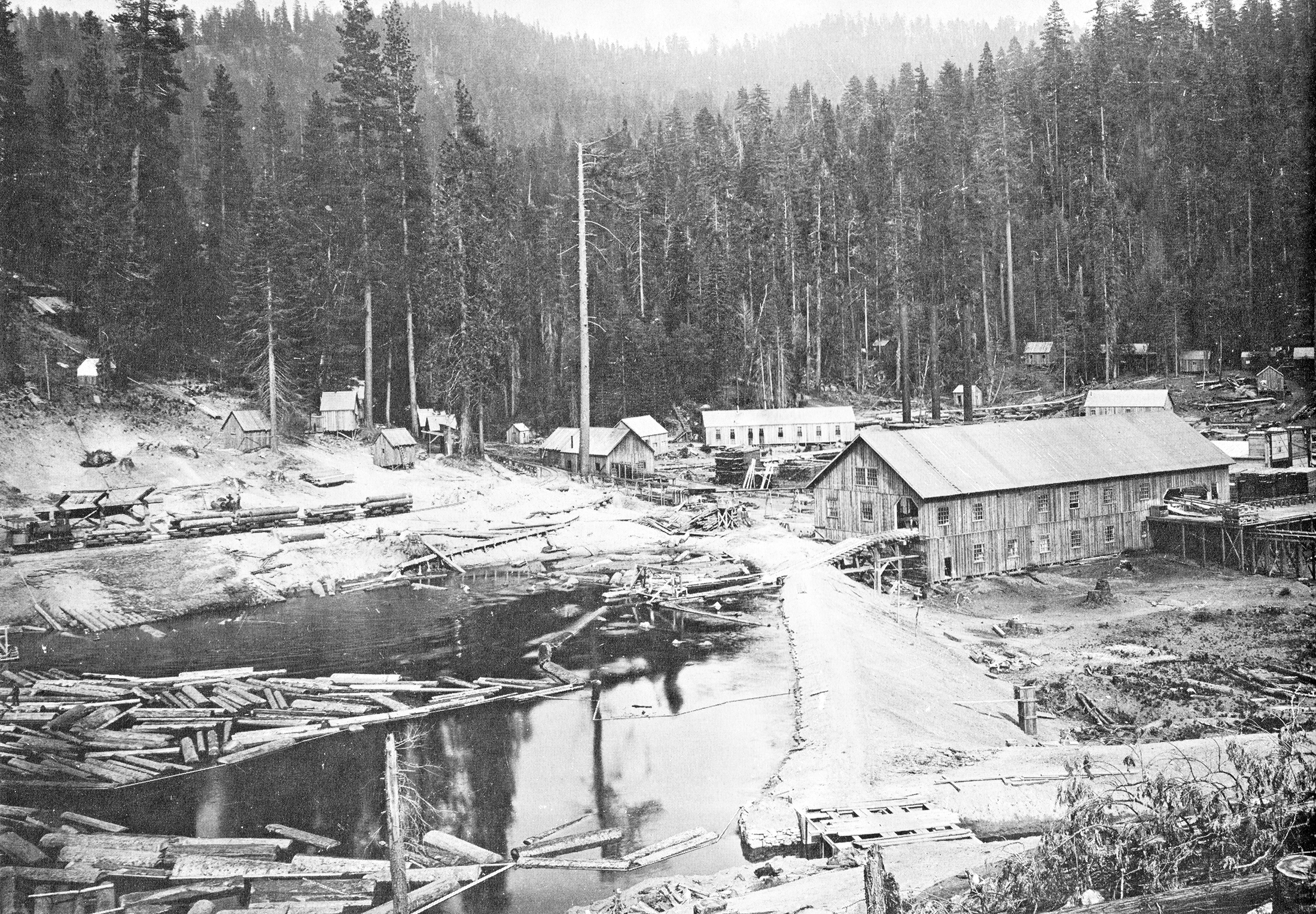
The first mill at Sugar Pine around 1920.

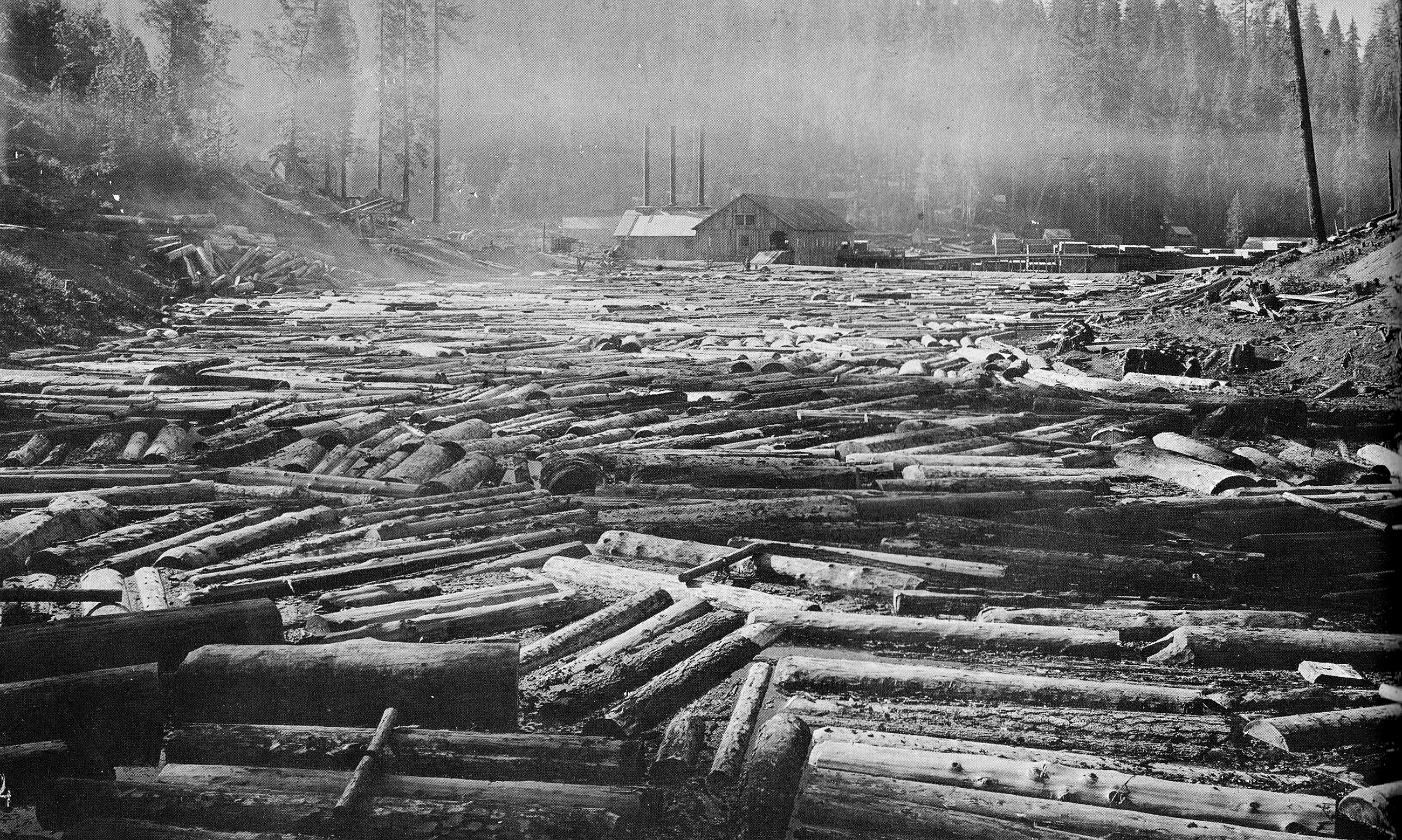
A "full deck" in the log pond ready to be cut.

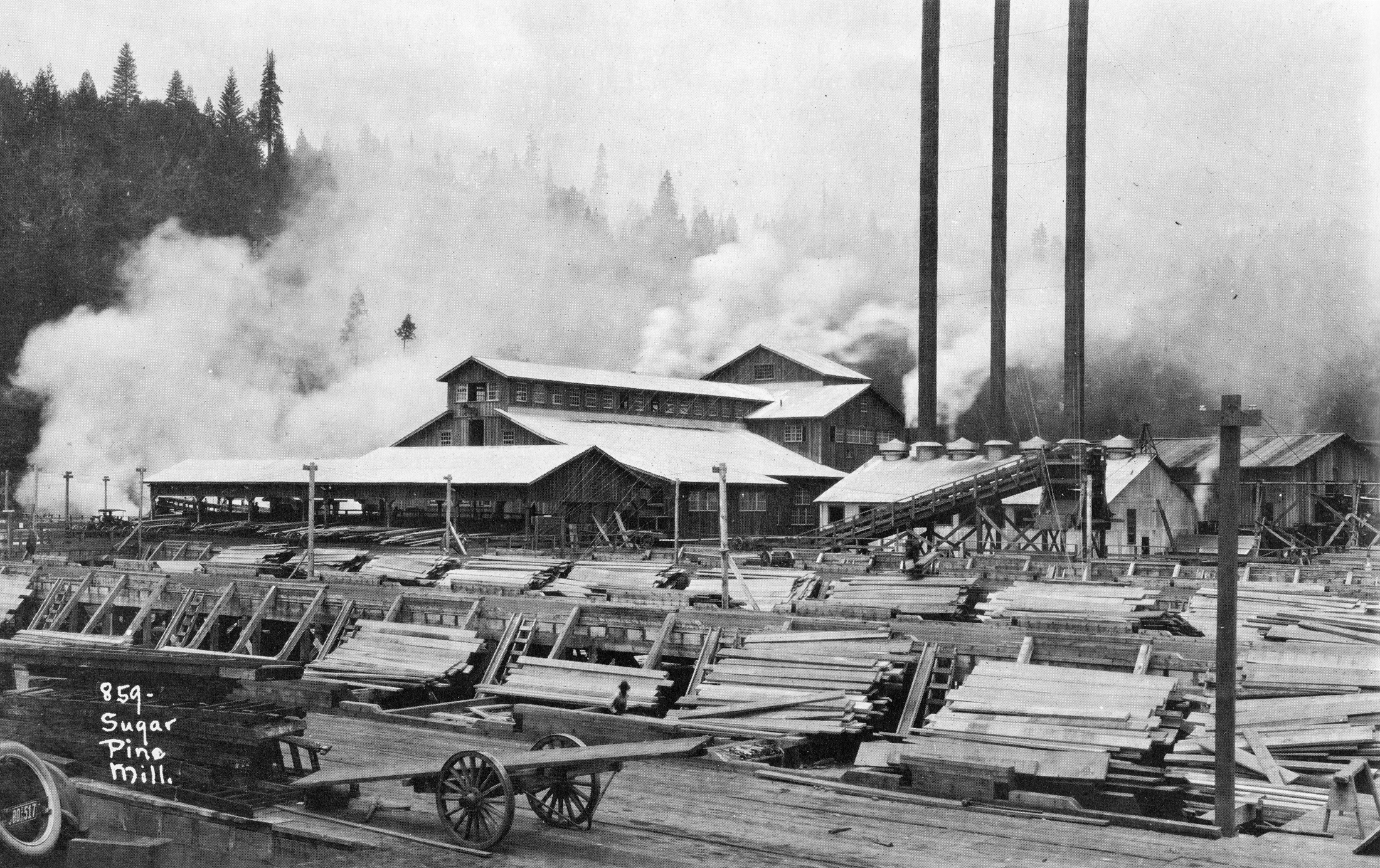
The Madera Sugar Pine company expanded the Sugar Pine Mill complex after a catastrophic fire in 1922.

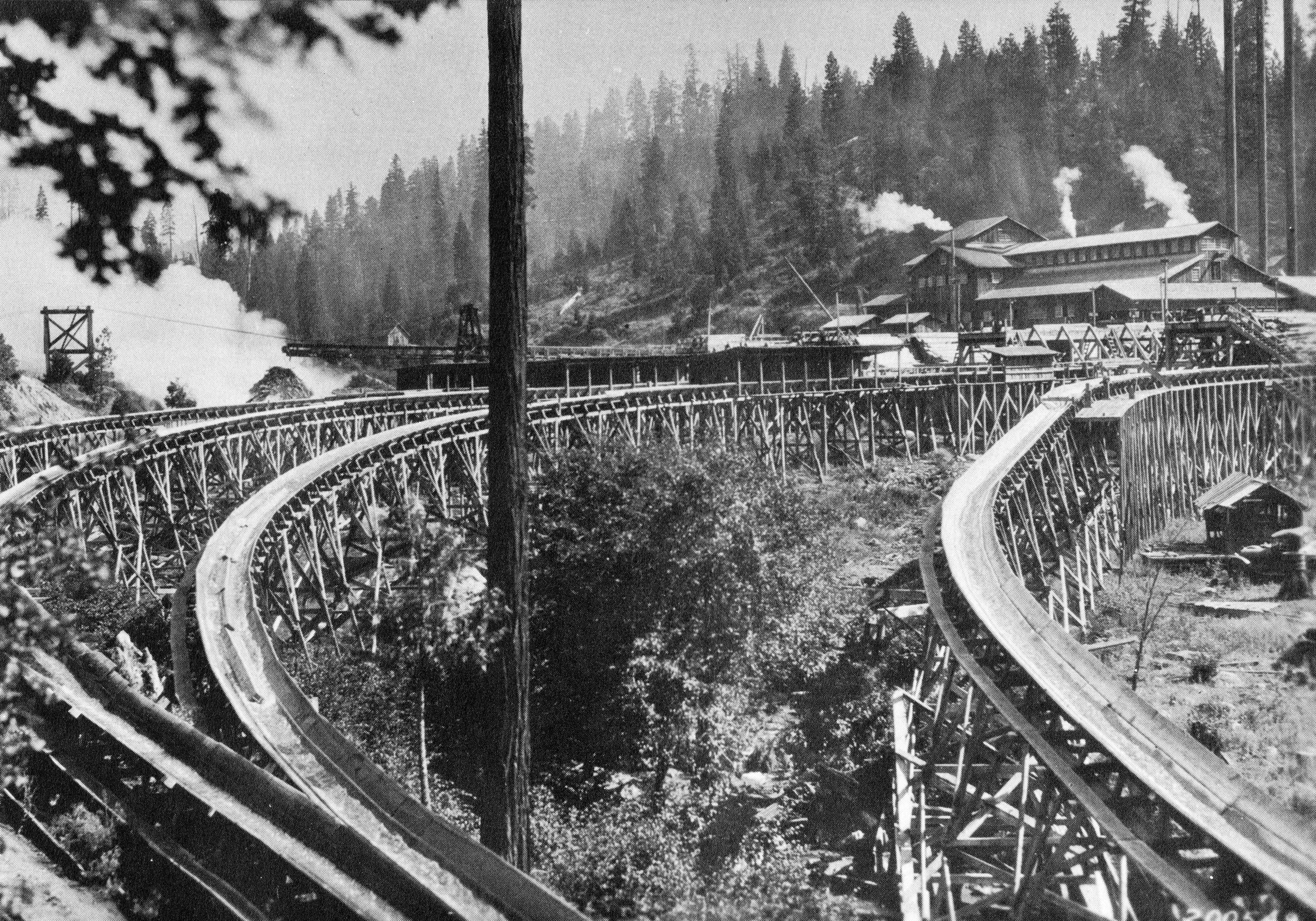
Several flume sections leave the mill to converge into one v-shaped trough for the 54-mile run to Madera, California.
