= Log pond =

Body of water for storage of wooden logs

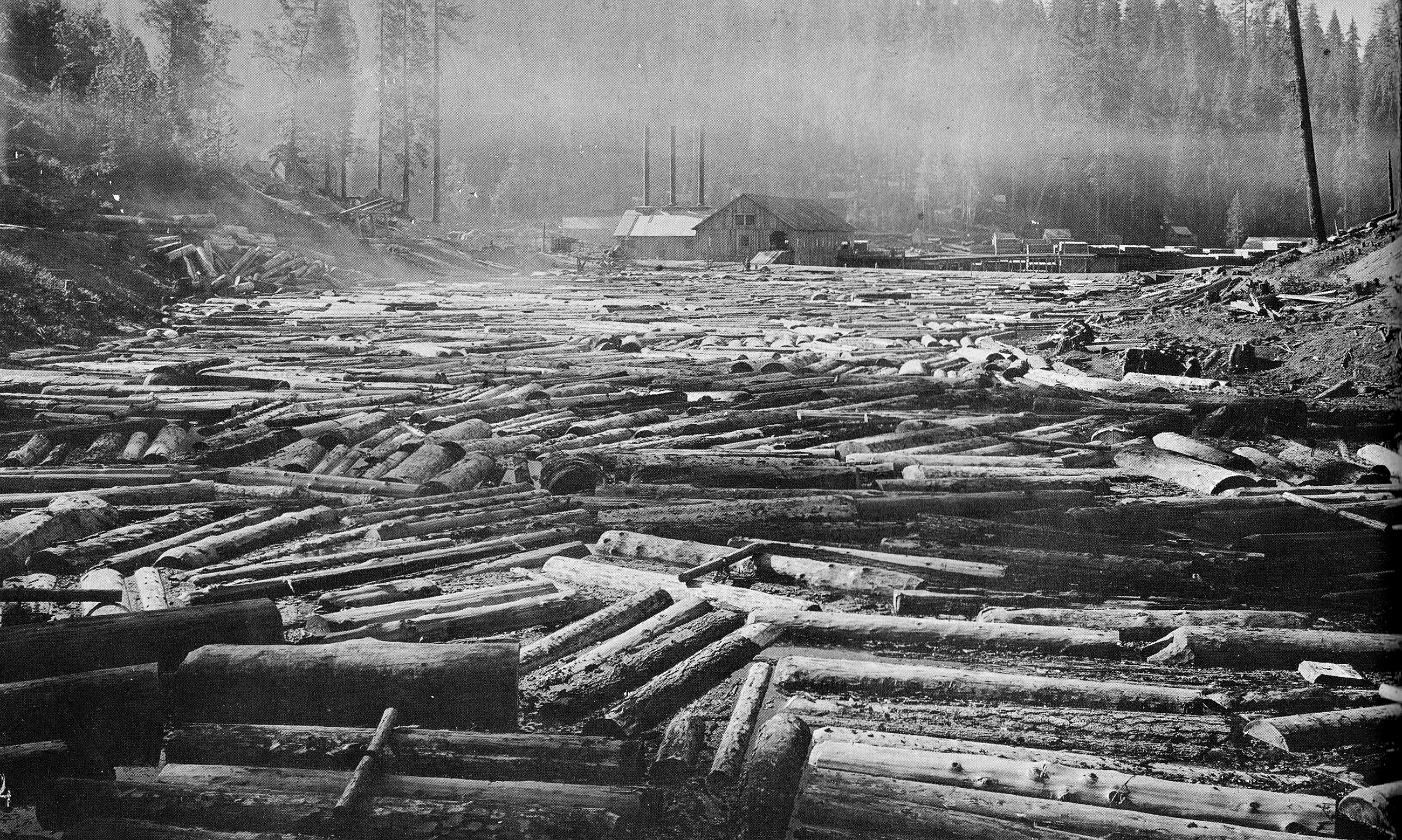
A "full deck" of logs awaiting the mill.

A log pond is a small lake or reservoir used for storage of wooden logs in readiness for milling at a sawmill. Although some mill ponds served this purpose for water-powered sawmills, steam-powered sawmills used log ponds for transportation of logs near the mill; and did not require the elevation drop of watermill reservoirs.

== Background ==
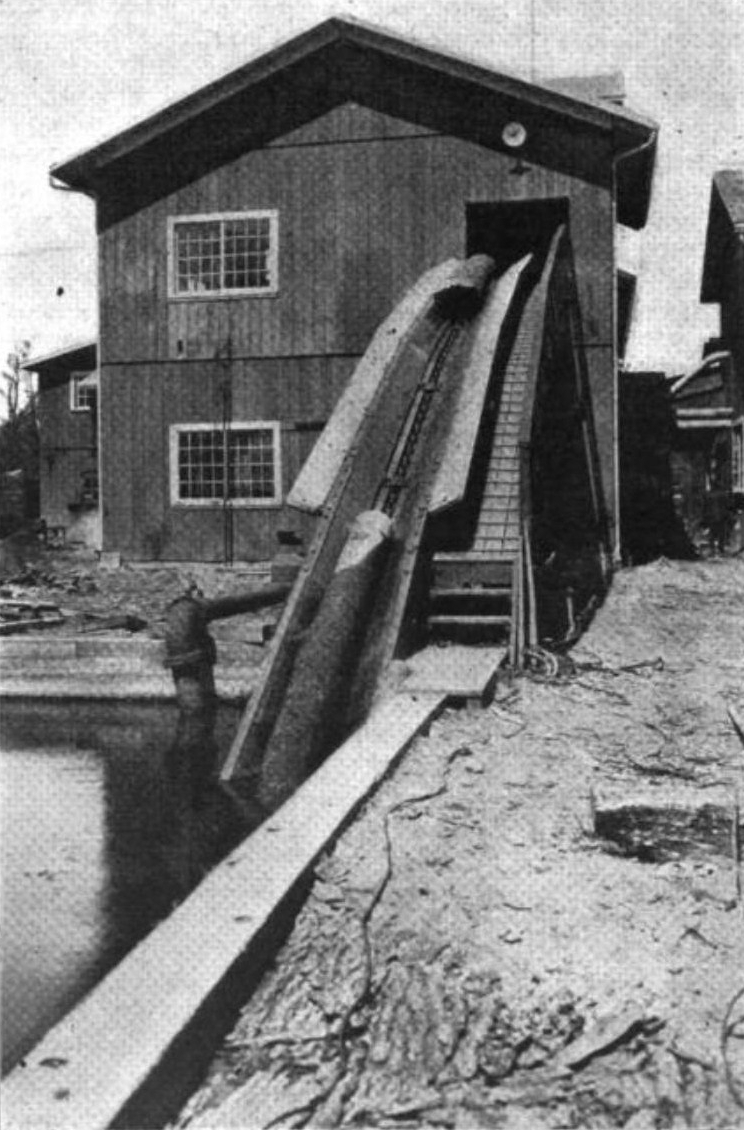
Log being hoisted from a log pond into the sawmill.

The earliest mechanized sawmills of the industrial revolution were built on navigable rivers, lakes, or estuaries where logs could be floated to the sawmill and lumber could be carried to markets aboard ships or barges. Early steam sawmills included a hoist to lift logs out of the water onto a carriage which moved the log past a stationary powered saw. Men could relatively easily push floating logs into position to be lifted by the hoist. Forests distant from navigable water became accessible with the development of railroads. Sawmills adjacent to navigable waters were termed cargo mills, in contrast to interior rail mills relying upon railroad transportation of logs and lumber. Until tractors powered by internal combustion engines were powerful enough to move logs, ponds were required to simplify movement of logs from storage to the sawmill hoist. Storage of logs in water has the additional advantages of minimizing fire risks, washing away dirt which could dull saws, and preventing splitting of logs which might otherwise dry prior to milling. Cargo mills typically used a system of floating log booms to contain stored logs from delivery until milling.

== Log pond operation ==
Rail mills were built adjacent to small ponds when possible, but log ponds were often constructed by building a dam on a small stream where no suitable natural pond was available. Risks of periodic flood damage discouraged use of larger rivers for log ponds, but water might be diverted or pumped from a larger river to maintain water levels in an adjacent log pond. A railway spur would be built to a log dump where logs might be rolled or hoisted off flat cars into the pond. Log ponds were constructed with surface area allowing floating storage of the inventory of logs required to maintain sawmill production through periods when logging or rail deliveries might be interrupted.

Log ponds are convenient water reservoirs for firefighting at sawmills; and for routine cooling and lubrication of saw blades and other mill machinery. Stormwater runoff from the mill yard and wastewater generated within the sawmill often flow into the log pond as the lowest point adjacent to the sawmill. Boiler blowdown, lumber drying kiln condensate, and exhaust steam from sawmill machinery sometimes kept a log pond from freezing during cold weather.

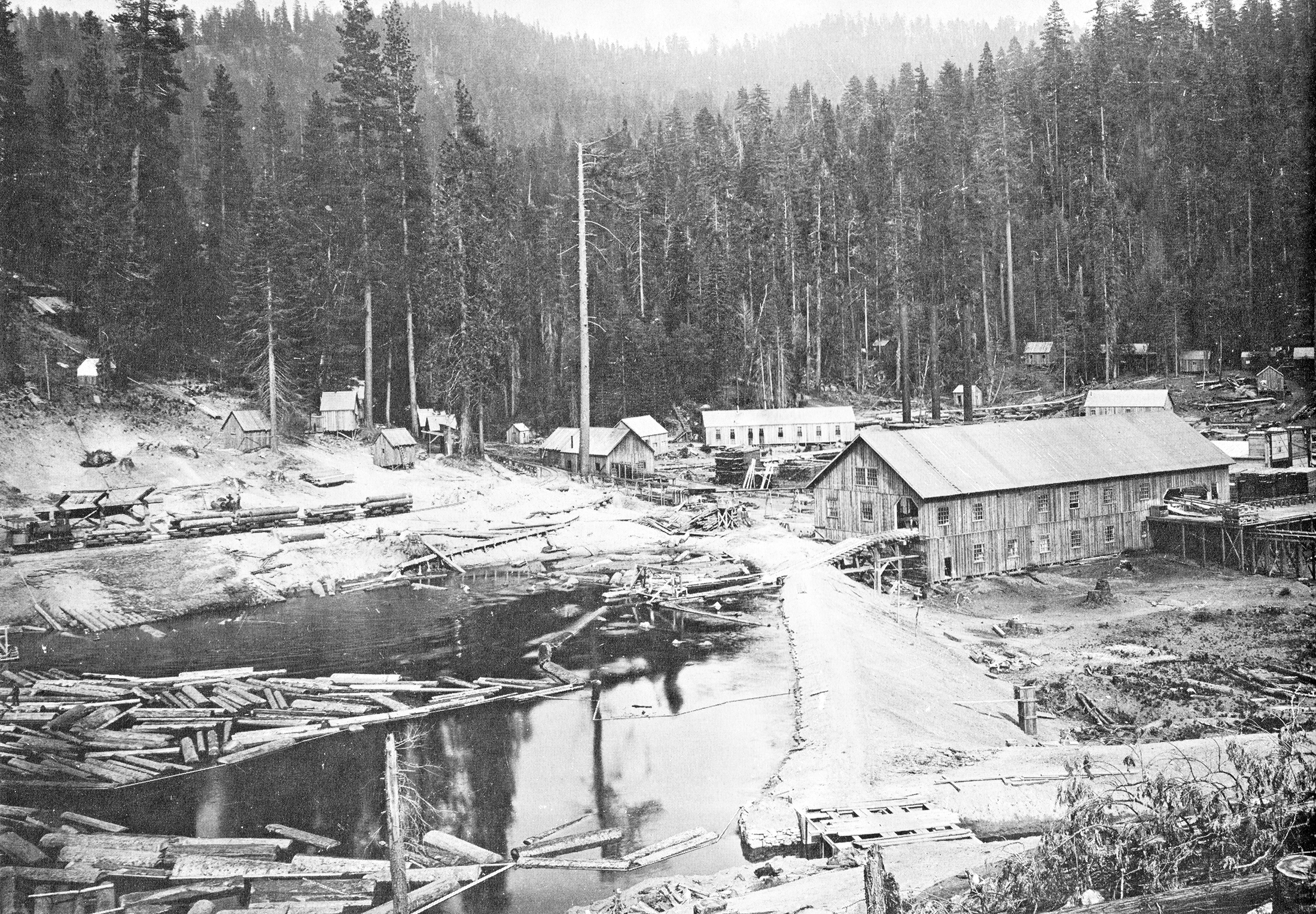
A log pond supplied by railway in Sugar Pine, California around 1920.

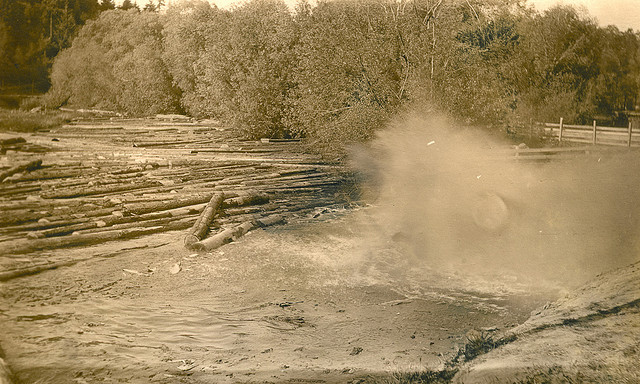
Splash of logs being dumped into a log pond

== Environmental considerations ==
Log ponds are convenient reservoirs for water recycling in applications including hydraulic debarkers or dust suppression. Log ponds offer some wastewater treatment similar to a settling basin and facultative lagoon. Log pond overflow during rainfall and snowmelt may contain floating pieces of wood and bark, dissolved organic compounds leached from wood, and suspended particles of sawdust and soil. The United States Environmental Protection Agency published wet storage category effluent limitations in the 1970s prohibiting discharge of floating woody debris and requiring log pond overflow pH to be between 6 and 9.

== Sources ==
- Carranco, Lynwood Redwood Lumber Industry Golden West Books, San Marino, California (1982) ISBN 0-87095-084-3
- Oakleaf, H.B. Lumber Manufacture in the Douglas Fir Region Commercial Journal Company, Chicago
