= New River (Trinity River tributary) =

Stream in California, United States

- Location of the New River In California

Location
- Country: United States
- State: California

Physical characteristics
- Source: Salmon Mountains where Virgin and Slide Creek meet below the Virgin Creek Buttes
  - location: Shasta-Trinity National Forest
  - coordinates: 41°01′46″N 123°20′56″W
  - elevation: 2,014 ft (614 m)
- Mouth: Trinity River
  - location: near Burnt Ranch
  - coordinates: 40°50′45″N 123°28′48″W
  - elevation: 692 ft (211 m)
- Length: 21.4 mi (34.4 km)
- Basin size: 225 sq mi (580 km^{2})
- Discharge
  - location: Denny
  - average: 437 cu ft/s (12.4 m^{3}/s)
  - minimum: 26.2 cu ft/s (0.74 m^{3}/s)
  - maximum: 60,000 cu ft/s (1,700 m^{3}/s)

National Wild and Scenic River
- Designated: January 19, 1981

The New River (Chimariko: č'altasom 'aqʰa, Hupa: yiduqi-nilin, Karok: akráah kumásaamvaroo) is a 21.4-mile-long (34.4 km) tributary of the Trinity River in northern California. The river was named by miners during the California Gold Rush in the early 1850s. While prospecting west from earlier diggings on the upper Trinity River, they named the river due to it being a "new" place to search for gold.

== Geography ==
The New River originates in the Salmon Mountains at the confluence of Virgin Creek and Slide Creek, in the western part of the Shasta-Trinity National Forest. The river initially runs south, until the confluence with the East Fork New River, where it turns southwest. It then receives Quimby Creek and passes Denny, one of several small communities originally established by Gold Rush miners. It turns south at the confluence with China Creek, then receives Big Creek at Hoboken, from where it flows southwest to join the Trinity River about 2.5 miles (4.0 km) north of Burnt Ranch. The New River drains about 225 square miles (580 km^{2}) of rugged mountains and forests; almost 70 percent of the watershed is in the Trinity Alps Wilderness.

== History ==
New River had a rich history of Native Americans. The Chimariko lived along its lower reaches until they were forced from their homes by European prospectors and absorbed by the Tsnungwe, including the tł'oh-mitah-xwe. On the upper river, they would hunt, as would the Shasta peoples who lived on the other side of the Salmon River divide, namely the New River Shasta and Konomihu.

== Recreation ==
The New River contains rapids ranging from class I to almost class V, with flows ranging from 400 to 1000+ cfs, and is run mainly by advanced kayakers and rafters. The entire main stem of the river was designated a National Wild and Scenic River in 1980. With the exception of a few small settlements along the New River, most of the watershed is remote, isolated backcountry that is seldom visited.
