= Tsnungwe =

Ethnic group

tse꞉ning-xwe
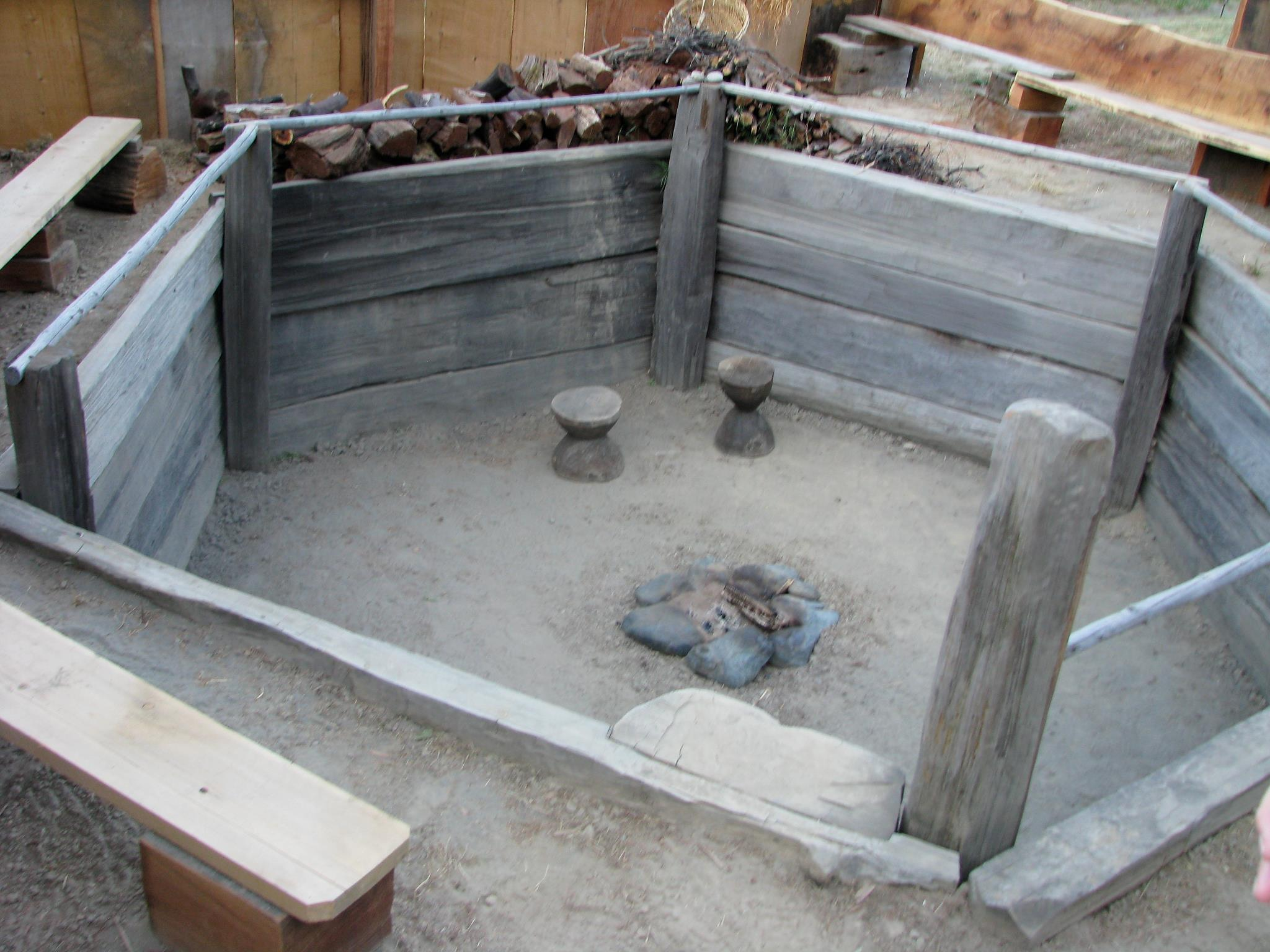
- łe꞉lding xontah - mouth of the South Fork of the Trinity River, principal Tsnungwe village

Total population
- 150-200

Regions with significant populations
- California (Salyer )

Languages
- Hupa, Chimariko

The Tsnungwe (current Hupa-language orthography, own name: Tse꞉ningxwe - "Tse꞉ning-din (Ironside Mountain) People") or Tsanunghwa are a Native American people indigenous to the modern areas of the lower South Fork Trinity River (yisinchʼing-qeh), Willow Creek (xoxol-ding), Salyer (miy-meʼ), Burnt Ranch (tse꞉n-ding/tse꞉ning-ding) and New River (Yiduq-nilin) along the Trinity River (hunʼ 'river') in Trinity and Humboldt County in California. The Tsnungwe were a bilingual Hupa-Chimariko-speaking people and are known by the Hupa-speaking peoples as tse꞉ning-xwe. The primary language was the Tsnungwe dialect of Hupa, and the secondary language was Chimariko, although spoken with a Hupa accent.

The Tsnungwe include two sub-groups called łe꞉lxwe ('People of łe꞉l-ding') after their most important settlement and religious center, and the Chima꞉lxweʼ/Chimalakwe/Tłʼoh-mitah-xwe ('grass, prairies-amongst-people') along New River. The Karuk living north of the Salmon River Divide called the Chima꞉lxweʼ/Chimalakwe/Tłʼoh-mitah-xwe Akráak vaʼára ('New River People'). The Norelmuk Wintu from Hayfork called the Tsnungwe Num-nor-muk.

Because their language is a dialect of the Hupa language, they are also called South Fork Hupa. Other tribal names refer to their territories occupied: South Fork Indians, Burnt Ranch, South Fork Trinity Tribe, and Kelta/Tlelwe/Hlelwe/Tlelding/Leldin Tribe or Tlohomtahhoi, Chaltasom.

Neighboring tribes to the Tsnungwe include the Yurok, Redwood Creek Hupa, Hoopa Valley Hupa, Wiyot, Chimariko, Shasta, Karuk, and Wintu. Often times, Tsnungwe spoke many Native languages. C. Hart Merriam referred to Tsnungwe leader Saxey Kidd as "a well-known polyglot," speaker of many languages.

== Federal recognition ==
The Tsnungwe descendants are members of the Tsnungwe Council: recognized by both Humboldt and Trinity counties, previously recognized by the United States of America, and working to have that federally-recognized status restored.

== Culture ==
The traditional Tsnungwe diet included salmon, steelhead, Pacific lamprey "eels", black tail deer, and other local animals and plants.

== Language ==
The language of the Tsnungwe is considered a dialect of the Hupa language of the Pacific Coast Athabaskan language group of North American native languages. This language (Diningʼxine꞉wh 'Hupa-speaking people', 'Hupa Indians') with various dialects is spoken (Tse꞉ning-xwe, dialect of South Fork and New River areas); (na꞉tinixwe 'Hoopa Valley Hupa'); (Chilula/Whilkut/Me꞉w-yinaq/Whiyłqit 'Redwood Creek Hupa').

== Villages ==
=== Willow Creek area villages ===
misqine꞉qʼit/nisking-qʼit, nantsʼing-tah (Clover Flat), niskin-ji-ding/niskinje꞉ndihding (upriver from Willow Creek), da꞉chwanʼ-ding (opposite niskin-ji-ding), da꞉chwanʼ-ding mima꞉n-chʼing (opposite of da꞉chwunʼ-ding, Camp Kimtu), saqe꞉qʼit (alternative: so-keʼa-keit, sock-kail-kit), saqe꞉qʼit mima꞉n-chʼing (opposite of saqe꞉qʼit), yinaq-xa꞉-ding/yinuq xa꞉-ti-nit (all three at Willow Creek), tłʼohday-kyoh-qʼit, xowiykʼiłxowh-ding (formerly: kʼiqin-saʼan-ding, Knight's Trailer Park), tse꞉-ding (opposite xowiykʼiłxowh-ding/Knight's Trailer Park), xoxo꞉chʼe꞉lding (at the mouth of Willow Creek), minqʼit-ch-ding (Enchanted Springs), qʼaykist chʼe꞉xahsding (Gambi's, formerly: China Flat), tʼunchwing-tah (alternative: tash-huan-tat, tash-wan-ta), dʼahilding (alternative: a-hel-tah, ta-hail-ta, Whitson's), yinaq-xa꞉-ding (just above the mouth of Willow Creek).

=== South Fork Trinity area (yisinchʼing-qeh) villages ===
łe꞉l-ding (also: Tlelding 'place where the rivers (South Fork and Trinity) meet', about one mile downriver from today's Salyer, largest and leading Tsnungwe settlement; ancient times: a kʼixinay village), including the three sub-villages me꞉łchwin-qʼit, ta꞉kʼiwe꞉ltsil-qʼit (on the other side of the mouth of the South Fork), ta꞉ngʼay-qʼit (old name was mituqʼ-qʼit-ding); chʼiłte꞉l-ding, chway-meʼ (Sandy Bar), dahchiwh-ding (about 12 miles above the mouth of the river), dilchwehch-ding (also: hay nahdiyaw tehłchwin-ding 'place where the money grows, once an important rich settlement at the mouth of Campbell Creek),łichiwh-ding, tłʼoh-wa꞉ne/xołtsowch-ding (Saxey Ranch), niłtuq-tah-ding (mouth of Mosquito Creek into Grouse Creek), qosta꞉n-ding, yahtsʼameʼ, yidahtichʼinahding (Ammon Ranch), yunihting (Todd Ranch).

=== Trinity River (South Fork – Cedar Flat area) villages ===
hunʼ-kya꞉w-qeh (at Trinity River), ti-dił -ding (downstream from Salyer), xoling-kyoh-miye, miy-meʼ (alternative: meʼ-yemma, me-em-ma, Old Campbell Ranch/Fountain Ranch), kʼinunqʼ-ding, tse꞉-qʼit (Swanson's), no꞉kʼiwowh-ding (downstream from tse꞉-qʼit/Swanson's), kin-saʼan-ting (Irvings, Hawkins Bar), tse꞉łe꞉nga꞉ding (downstream from kin-saʼan-ting/Irvings), ta꞉wha꞉ wh-ding (Gray's Flat), xowung-qʼit (at a lake, near xwedaʼay-saʼan-meʼ/Chesbro's), xwedaʼay-saʼan-meʼ (Wells, Chesbro's).

=== Burnt Ranch and New River area villages ===
tse꞉n-ding/tse꞉-nung-din (Burnt Ranch, large settlement), tse꞉nung-axis-ding (near China Slide, upstream from yinuq-dinung-ting/McDonald's at Burnt Ranch), yinuq-dinung-ting (McDonald Ranch, Burnt Ranch), chʼe꞉nantiłting (at the mouth of the New River), chʼe꞉na꞉dawhding (Dyer's, Bell's Flat), chʼixe꞉ne꞉wh-din (also: ʼxolish na꞉xoxuyntaʼ – Martha Dyer Ziegler's, upstream from qowh-ding), kʼiłna꞉dil mitoʼ (Hoboken), kʼiyawh-michwan (at China Creek, also: xolish chʼena꞉xolxolding – China Creek), łige꞉y de꞉-dilła꞉t-ding (upstream from tłʼohne꞉s-ding/Quimby), tłʼohne꞉s-ding (at the mouth of Quinby Creek, Ladd's, Thomas', Quimby), qowh-ding (south of Panther Creek), tłʼohschʼilʼe꞉n-ding (Daily's, before: Moses Patterson), tse꞉na꞉ningʼa꞉ding (at the confluence of East Fork and New River), yiduq-nilin (New River), yiduq-łe꞉na꞉lding (at the forks of the New River upstream from Denny), tłʼoh-mitah-xwe (Hupa speakers in New River villages).
