= Chimariko language =

Extinct language isolate of California, US

Chimariko
- č'imariko
- Native to: United States
- Region: California
- Ethnicity: Chimariko
- Extinct: 1950s, with the death of Martha Ziegler
- Language family: Language isolate or Hokan ?: Chimariko
- Dialects: Trinity River; South Fork; New River

Language codes
- ISO 639-3: cid
- Glottolog: chim1301
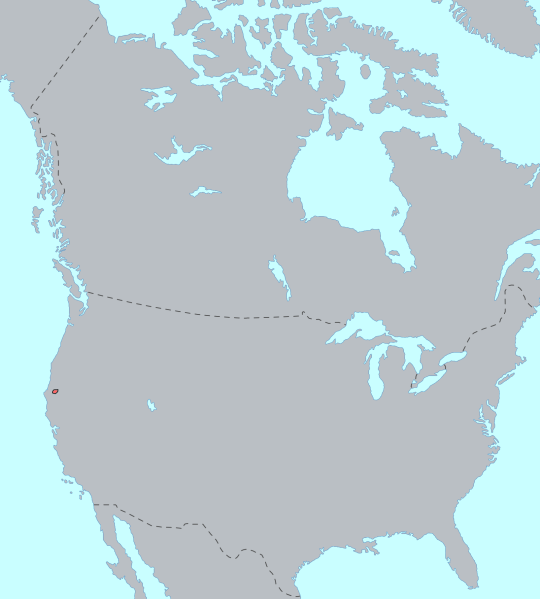
- Pre-contact distribution of Chimariko

Chimariko is an extinct language isolate formerly spoken in northern Trinity County, California, by the inhabitants of several independent communities. Although the total area claimed by these communities was small, Victor Golla has argued for the recognition of three distinct local dialects: Trinity River Chimariko, spoken along the Trinity River ('aqʰaqʰut) from the mouth of South Fork (pʰoriki) at Salyer (qʰa'a itxattače) as far upstream as Big Bar (hičʰeqʰut), with a principal village at Burnt Ranch (č’utamtače); South Fork Chimariko, spoken around the junction of South Fork and Hayfork Creek, with a principal village at Hyampom (xawinpom); and New River Chimariko, spoken along New River (č'altasom 'aqʰa) on the southern slopes of the Trinity Alps, with a principal village at Denny.

== Classification ==
Proposals linking Chimariko to other languages in various versions of the hypothetical Hokan family have been advanced. Roland Dixon suggested a relationship between Chimariko and the Shastan and Palaihnihan families. Edward Sapir's famous 1929 classification grouped Chimariko together with the Shastan, Palaihnihan, Pomoan, Karuk, and Yana languages in a Hokan sub-grouping known as Northern Hokan. A "Kahi" family consisting of Chimariko, Shastan, Palaihnihan, and Karuk has been suggested. Most specialists currently find these relationships to be undemonstrated, and consider Chimariko to be best considered an isolate.

== Documentation ==
Stephen Powers collected the first word list from Chimariko speakers in 1875. Soon after, Jeremiah Curtin documented a substantial amount of information. Roland Dixon began work on the Chimariko language in the early 1900s, when there were few remaining speakers. Dixon worked with two: Mrs. Dyer and a man who was named Friday. While doing work with nearby Hupa, Edward Sapir collected data and also commented on the earlier Dixon work. Later, extensive documentation on the language was carried out by J.P. Harrington, who worked with Sally Noble, the last fluent speaker of the language. None of this work has been published, but slides of all of Harrington's work can be viewed on the Smithsonian Institution's website. Harrington's assistant John Paul Marr also made recordings of the language with speaker Martha Ziegler. George Grekoff collected previous works of linguistics intending to write a grammar, but died before it was completed. The last Chimariko speaker was Martha Ziegler, who died in the 1950s. According to Golla, bilingual Hupa-Chimariko speakers native to the South Fork of the Trinity River, Burnt Ranch and New Rivers areas, organized as the Tsnungwe Tribe, "[are] seeking federal acknowledgement, consider both Hupa and Chimariko to be their heritage languages but emphasize Hupa for purposes of cultural revitalization." There have been recent efforts to revitalize the Chimariko language among descendants today. A Chimariko language dictionary was published in August of 2026 (see in External Links section).

== Phonology ==
=== Consonants ===
The consonant inventory of Chimariko is as follows:

		Bilabial	Dental	Alveolar	Retroflex	Palatal	Velar	Uvular	Glottal
Stop and affricate	tenuis	p	t	ts	ʈ	tʃ	k	q	
Stop and affricate	aspirate	pʰ	tʰ	tsʰ	ʈʰ	tʃʰ	kʰ	qʰ	
Stop and affricate	ejective	p’	t’	ts’	ʈ’	tʃ’	k’	q’	ʔ
Fricative				s		ʃ	x	χ	h
Sonorant		m	n	l, r		j	w		

=== Vowels ===
The vowel inventory of Chimariko is as follows:

	Front	Central	Back
High	i		u
Mid	e		o
Low		a	

=== Syllables ===
Chimariko shares syllabic similarities with other languages in Northern California. The most common syllable structures for Chimariko are CV and CVC, with the largest possible structures being CCVC or CVCC.

== Grammar ==
Because the documentary corpus of Chimariko was limited, the description of the grammar of the language was not complete. However, general observations were made.

Among the recorded grammatical characteristics are the following: Chimariko had reduplication in many nominal forms, particularly in the names of fauna (e.g., tsokoko-tci "bluejay", himimitcei "grouse"). Like many American languages (such as Shasta, Maidu, Wintun, as well as Shoshoni, Siouan, and Pomo), Chimariko verbs had a series of instrumental and body-part prefixes, indicating the particular body part or object with which an action was carried out. Instrumentals are attached at the beginning of the verb root and often occur with a suffix which indicates the motion in the verb, such as -ha "up", -hot "down", and -usam "through".

List of instrumentals from Dixon:
a-	with a long object
e-	with the end of a long object
me-	with the head
mitci-	with the foot
tcu-	with a round object
tu-	with the hand
wa-	by sitting on

Chimariko does not use numeral classifiers. Also lacking is a clear pattern to indicate control.

Pronominal affixes by verb stem class
			i-stem	a-stem	e-stem	o-stem	u-stem
1st person	singular	agent	ˀi	ye	ye	yo	yu
1st person	singular	patient	čʰu	čʰa	čʰo	čʰo	čʰu
1st person	plural	agent	ya	ya	ya	ya	ya
1st person	plural	patient	čʰa	čʰa	čʰa	čʰa	čʰa
2nd person	singular		me, mi	me, ma	me, me	me, mo	me, mu
2nd person	plural	agent	qʰo, qʰu	qʰo, qʰa	qʰo, qʰo	qʰo, qʰo	qʰo, qʰu
2nd person	plural	patient	qʰa	qʰa	qʰa	qʰa	qʰa
3rd person			hi	ha	he	ho	hu

=== Morphology ===
Noun incorporation is present in Chimariko. The verbs have prefixes, suffixes and a circumfix.

Verb templates:

Person	Root	Negative kuna	Directional	Tense/Aspect	Mood

Person	Negative x-	Root	Negative -na	Directional	Tense/Aspect	Mood

Root	Person	Tense/Aspect	Mood

=== Numerals ===
According to Carmen Jany, "no other language has the exact same system as Chimariko". Chimariko uses both a decimal and quinary numeral systems. Numerals appear in noun phrases, do not take affixes (except for the determinative suffix -lle), can either follow or precede the noun, and can appear without a noun.

=== Space, time, modality ===
There are two demonstrative pronouns in Chimariko indicating "here" and "there". Qè- indicates here, or near the speaker, and pa- indicates there, or a distance from the speaker. To indicate "this" and "that", the intensive suffix -ut is added:

This: qèwot, qât
That: pamut, paut, pât

directional suffixes
-ktam/-tam	'down'
-ema/-enak	'into'
-ha	'up'
-hot	'down'
-lo	'apart'
-ro	'up'
-sku	'towards'
-smu	'across'
-tap	'out'
-tku/-ku	Cislocative ('towards here')
-tmu/-mu	Transmotional ('towards there')
-kh	'motion towards here'
-m	'motion towards there'
-tpi	'out of'
-xun/-xunok	'in, into'
-qʰa	'along'
-pa	'off, away'
-qʰutu	'into water'
-čʼana	'to, toward'
-čama	'in, into'

The modal system in Chimariko is abundant. Modal suffixes attach at the very end of a verb after all other suffixes are applied and generally do not occur with aspectual suffixes. The modal suffixes function as interrogatives, negatives, dubitatives, speculatives, conditionals, emphatics, potentials, potential futures, purposive futures, optatives, desideratives, imperatives, admonitives, intensives, inferentials, resultatives, and evidentials.

=== Sentence structure ===
The research available indicates a variation in opinion about Chimariko's word order. Dixon claimed that usual word order is SVO or SOV, but in some cases the object precedes the subject, especially when the subject is pronominal. Jany claims that word order is not rigid but is mainly verb-final. The clauses are separated by brackets and the verbs are bolded in the following example:

ʔawaidače xowonat, šičel hiwontat
[ʔawa-ida-če x-owo-na-t] [šičel h-iwonta-t]
home-POSS-LOC NEG-stay-NEG-ASP horse 3-ride-ASP
'She does not stay at home, she goes around on horseback.'

Inside noun phrases, there is variation in order of modifiers and the noun; sometimes the noun comes before other elements of the phrase, sometimes after. When dealing with possession, the subject always precedes the object.

=== Case ===
Chimariko has an agent/patient case system. For first persons, agent and patient are differentiated, and third persons are not. Person hierarchy in the argument structure is present as well where speech act participants are favored over third persons.

mokoxanaˀ
m-oko-xana-ˀ
2SG-tattoo-FUT-Q
'Are you going to tattoo her?'

=== Possession ===
Chimariko differentiates alienable and inalienable possession. Alienable possessions such as objects and kinship are marked by suffix, while inalienable possessions such as body parts are marked by prefix, on the possessed.

			Prefixed/ Inalienable	Suffixed/ Alienable
1st person	singular	'my'	čʰ-	-ˀe/-ˀi
1st person	plural	'our'	čʰa-	-čʰe
2nd person	singular	'your'	m-	-mi
2nd person	plural	'you all's'	qʰ-	-qʰ
3rd person	singular	'his/her'	h-	-ita/-ye
3rd person	plural	'their'	h-	-ita

Examples from JP Harrington field notes contrasting alienable and inalienable possession:

    čʰ-uweš         'my horn'(deer says)
    noˀot huweš-ˀi  'my horn' (Frank says)

=== Complementation ===
In Chimariko, there is no grammatical complementation, however there are a few strategies to convey semantic complementation including separate clauses, verbal affixes, the use of attitude words, and using the desiderative imiˀna 'to want'.

Complements with utterance predicates (separate clauses):

himisamdudaˀn sideˀw
[himisamdu-daˀn] [si-deˀw]
devil-INF say-PASS
'It must have been the devil, they said.' (complement is bolded; clauses are in brackets)

Desiderative imiˀna ‘to want’ with clausal arguments

yuwom imiˀnan
y-uwo-m imiˀna-n
1SG.A-go-DIR want-ASP
'I want to go home'

=== Relative clauses ===
In Chimariko, relativization can be done one of two ways – using a special verb suffix -rop/-rot to form internally headed clauses, and or by a headless relative clause. There is a relative pronoun map'un that is sometimes used. The following is an example given by Jany:

map’un hokoteˀrot yečiˀ ˀimiˀnan
[map’un h-oko-teˀ-rot] y-ečiˀ ˀi-miˀn-an
that.one 3-?-DER-DEP 1SG.A-buy 1SG-want-ASP
I want to buy that engraved one.

The relative clause is in brackets. map’un is the head.

== Vocabulary ==
=== Placenames ===
This table lists a few present-day locations in Chimariko territory.

Location	Chimariko	Gloss
Burnt Ranch	č'utamtače	'Place of the fishing hole'
Ironside Mountain	čalitan 'awu	N/A
Hawkin's Bar	'amaitače	'Place of their land'
Hoboken	šiičiwi 'aqʰai	'wolf's water'
Big Bar	hičʰeqʰut	'Down at the deer lick'
Big Flat	čuntxapmu	N/A
Helena	'ak'iče	'Place of the salt'
Junction City	hisa'emu	'Road goes uphill'
Weaverville	ho'raqtu	'Small owl in water'
Hyampom	xawinpom	N/A
Hayfork	ṭanqʰoma	N/A
Salyer	qʰa'etxattače	'Place of the rocks everywhere'
Cedar Flat	hots'i'nakčʰa xotai	'Three cedars'
Del Loma	čʰičʰa'anma	'Red manzanita land'

=== Animals ===
English	Chimariko
deer	'a'a
bear	čʰisamra
salmon	'umul
dog, horse	šičela
bird	ti'ra
wolf	šiičiwi
coyote	čʰirintoosa
elk	'a'eno'
frog	q'oṭeš
fox	'apʰančolla
great horned owl	č'utkuruhčʰei
duck	xa'xa'čʰei
abalone	selhem
snail	č'anapa

== Bibliography ==
- Campbell, Lyle (1997). American Indian languages: The historical linguistics of Native America. New York: Oxford University Press. ISBN 0-19-509427-1.
- Conathan, Lisa (2004). The Linguistic Ecology of Northwestern California: Contact, Functional Convergence and Dialectology (PhD thesis). University of California Berkeley.
- Dixon, Roland Burrage (1910). "The Chimariko Indians and Language". University of California Publications in American Archaeology and Ethnology. 5 (5): 293–380.
- Goddard, Ives, ed. (1996). Languages. Handbook of North American Indians. Vol. 17. Washington, DC: Smithsonian Institution. ISBN 0-16-048774-9.
- Golla, Victor (2011). California Indian Languages. Berkeley: University of California Press. ISBN 978-0-520-26667-4.
- Jany, Carmen (2007a). "Is there any evidence for complementation in Chimariko?". International Journal of American Linguistics. 73 (1): 94–113. doi:10.1086/518336.
- Jany, Carmen (2007b). Chimariko in Areal and Typological Perspective (Thesis). Santa Barbara: University of California. OCLC 759566867. ProQuest 304879507.
- Jany, Carmen (2009). Chimariko Grammar: Areal and Typological Perspective. University of California Publications in Linguistics. Vol. 142. University of California Press. ISBN 978-0-520-09875-6.
- Luthin, Herbert (2002). Surviving through the Days. Berkeley: University of California Press. ISBN 978-0-520-22270-0.
- Mithun, Marianne (1999). The languages of Native North America. Cambridge: Cambridge University Press. ISBN 0-521-23228-7.
- Sapir, Edward (1911) [1990]. William Bright (ed.). "Review of Roland B. Dixon: The Chimariko Indians and Language". The Collected Works of Edward Sapir V: American Indian Languages. New York: Mouton de Gruyter. pp. 185–187. ISBN 0-89925-654-6.
