= Burnt Ranch, California =

Burnt Ranch č’utamtače (Chimariko)
- census-designated place
- Location of Burnt Ranch in Trinity County, California.

- Position in California.
- Coordinates: 40°48′38″N 123°28′46″W
- Country: United States
- State: California
- County: Trinity

Area
  - Total: 13.38 sq mi (34.66 km^{2})
  - Land: 13.38 sq mi (34.66 km^{2})
  - Water: 0 sq mi (0.00 km^{2}) 0.01%
- Elevation: 1,502 ft (458 m)

Population (2020)
  - Total: 250
  - Density: 19/sq mi (7.2/km^{2})
- Time zone: UTC-8 (Pacific (PST))
  - Summer (DST): UTC-7 (PDT)
- ZIP Code: 95527
- Area code: 530
- GNIS feature ID: 2582954

Burnt Ranch (Chimariko: č’utamtače) a census-designated place (CDP) in Trinity County, California, United States. It has a school and a post office. Its ZIP Code is 95527, and it is in area code 530. Its elevation is 1,502 feet (458 m). Its population is 250 as of the 2020 census, down from 281 from the 2010 census.

== History ==
In early times, the area was inhabited by people speaking a form of the Chimariko language, which was spoken along the Trinity River from the mouth of South Fork at Salyer as far upstream as Big Bar; their principal village was at present-day Burnt Ranch. Pre-contact, the Native American people of this area all spoke Chimariko as well as a dialect of the Hupa language. This is the Tsnungwe dialect of Hupa.

Burnt Ranch is so named because a party of Indian raiders burned down the majority of the town in 1863.

On 2 August 1858, J.W. Winslet's party of 16 men from Burnt Ranch were ambushed by the Whilkut in the Bald Hills along a trail to the Hupa villages, killing one man and wounding Winslet; the party retreated to Pardee's Ranch.

Burnt Ranch was destroyed in the spring of 1863 by an Indian raiding party.

"On the Trinity, for many miles above its confluence with the Klamath, there were indications of a general uprising of discontented tribes. At Cedar Flat a trading post was attacked and destroyed, the keeper and another man escaping to Burnt Ranch. The family at Burnt Ranch was removed to a safer locality, and none too soon; one day thereafter the Indians arrived and set fire to everything that would burn."

Burnt Ranch became a temporary camp from May to November 1864, used by 1st Battalion California Volunteer Mountaineers while moving Indians to Fort Humboldt.

== Geography ==
According to the United States Census Bureau, the CDP covers an area of 13.4 square miles (35 km^{2}), of which 99.99% is land and 0.01% is water. The town is 15.7 miles southeast of Willow Creek on State Route 299.

=== Climate ===
This region experiences hot and dry summers. According to the Köppen Climate Classification system, Burnt Ranch has a warm-summer Mediterranean climate, abbreviated "Csb" on climate maps.

== Demographics ==
Historical population
Census	Pop.	Note	%±
2010	281		—
2020	250		−11.0%
U.S. Decennial Census; 1850–1870 1880-1890; 1900 1910 1920; 1930 1940 1950; 1960 1970 1980; 1990 2000 2010

Amesti first appeared as a census designated place in the 2010 U.S. census.

=== 2020 census ===
As of the 2020 census, Burnt Ranch had a population of 250. The population density was 18.7 inhabitants per square mile (7.2/km^{2}). The median age was 48.0 years. The age distribution was 39 people (15.6%) under the age of 18, 11 people (4.4%) aged 18 to 24, 69 people (27.6%) aged 25 to 44, 69 people (27.6%) aged 45 to 64, and 62 people (24.8%) who were 65 years of age or older. For every 100 females, there were 135.8 males, and for every 100 females age 18 and over there were 145.3 males age 18 and over.

0.0% of residents lived in urban areas, while 100.0% lived in rural areas.

The whole population lived in households. There were 118 households in Burnt Ranch, of which 11.9% had children under the age of 18 living in them. Of all households, 39.8% were married-couple households, 10.2% were cohabiting-couple households, 39.0% were households with a male householder and no spouse or partner present, and 11.0% were households with a female householder and no spouse or partner present. About 33.1% of all households were made up of individuals and 5.1% had someone living alone who was 65 years of age or older. The average household size was 2.12. There were 66 families (55.9% of all households).

There were 135 housing units at an average density of 10.1 units per square mile (3.9 units/km^{2}), of which 118 (87.4%) were occupied and 17 (12.6%) were vacant. The homeowner vacancy rate was 1.1% and the rental vacancy rate was 0.0%. Of the occupied units, 87 (73.7%) were owner-occupied and 31 (26.3%) were occupied by renters.

Racial composition as of the 2020 census
Race	Number	Percent
White	193	77.2%
Black or African American	0	0.0%
American Indian and Alaska Native	11	4.4%
Asian	2	0.8%
Native Hawaiian and Other Pacific Islander	1	0.4%
Some other race	3	1.2%
Two or more races	40	16.0%
Hispanic or Latino (of any race)	19	7.6%

== Politics ==
In the state legislature, Burnt Ranch is in the 2nd senatorial district, represented by Democrat Mike McGuire, and the 2nd Assembly district, represented by Democrat Chris Rogers.

Federally, Burnt Ranch is in California's 2nd congressional district, represented by Democrat Jared Huffman.

== See also ==
- Trinity County, California
