= East Fork Trinity River =

East Fork Trinity River may refer to:

- East Fork Trinity River (California)
- East Fork Trinity River (Texas)
