= Chimariko people =

Chimariko
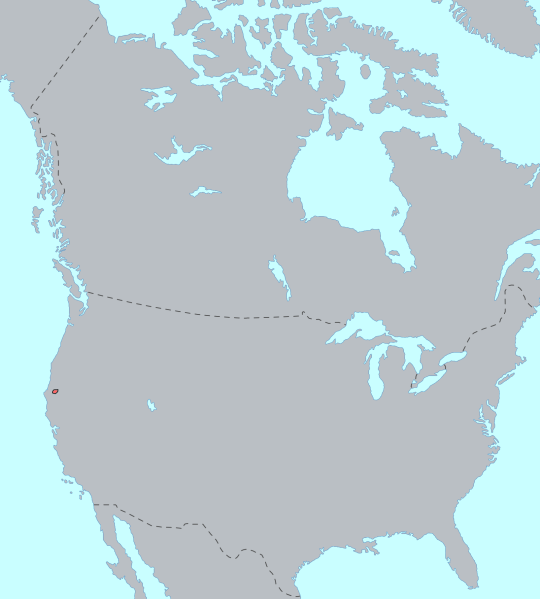
- range of Chimariko language

Total population
- 19 (2010, 60) 60 (including those of ancestral descent)

Regions with significant populations
- Northwest California

Languages
- formerly Chimariko

Religion
- traditional tribal religion

The Chimariko (Chimariko language: cʼʸˈimar, tʼʸimar, čimar, čʼimar or ǯimar - ″person / Indian″) are an Indigenous people of California, who originally lived in a narrow, 20-mile section of canyon on the Trinity River in Trinity County in northwestern California.

== History ==
Originally hunter-gatherers, the Chimariko are possibly the earliest residents of their region. They had good relations with the Wintu people and were enemies of the Hupa, a Southern Athabaskan people.

Non-native fur trappers first entered the Chimariko's territory in 1820, followed by miners and settlers in the 1850s. The Chimariko were profoundly affected by the destructive environmental practices of gold seekers during the California Gold Rush, starting in 1848. One of the major issues involved the disruption of the salmon population that was the main food source of the Chimariko. In the 1860s, conflict between the Chimariko and white miners led to the near extinction of their population. The surviving Chimariko fled to live with the Hoopa Valley Hupa, and nearby Tsnungwe (South Fork or New River Hupa) (also called: Tlohomtah’hoi) and Tlohomtah’hoi (New River or Salmon River Shasta).

== Culture ==
The Chimariko people constructed their homes from wood, featuring low walls and sloped roofs. Salmon and other fish were essential parts of their diet. Beyond fish, the Chimariko hunted various animals in the surrounding forests, including deer, elk, and bear, along with different bird species like quail and smaller creatures such as rabbits and rodents. Acorns formed the foundation of the Chimariko diet, just like they did for most Native Californians. The Chimariko had to go through a complicated process to prepare acorns by grinding them into a rough flour, then mixing this flour with water to create acorn bread. They baked this bread either on heated stones or in underground ovens that were warmed by hot stones. The Chimariko tribe also gathered and ate other foods like pine nuts, different types of berries, various wild seeds, and several kinds of roots.

== Language ==
Chimariko people spoke the Chimariko language, a language isolate. The language is currently extinct. The language probably became extinct sometime in the 1930s. It is extensively documented in unpublished fieldnotes which John Peabody Harrington obtained from the last speaker, Sally Noble, in the 1920s.

== Population ==
Estimates for the pre-contact populations of most native groups in California have varied substantially. Alfred L. Kroeber proposed that the 1770 population of the Chimariko, together with the New River, Konomihu, and Okwanuchu groups of the Shasta, had been about 1,000. Specifically for the Chimariko, he estimated an 1849 population of 250. Shirley Silver (1978:205) put the aboriginal population at "only a few hundred". Other estimates are that there were 250 Chimariko people in the 18th and early 19th centuries, moving down to 200 in 1852, 20 in 1880, and none by 1900. There may have been descendants of the Chimariko recently discovering their identity, since some Chimariko fled with the Hupa and Shasta. In the 2010 census, 60 people claimed Chimariko ancestry, 19 of them full-blooded.

== See also ==
- Chimariko traditional narratives
