= Chimariko traditional narratives =

Chimariko traditional narratives include myths, legends, tales, and oral histories preserved by the Chimariko people who lived on the Trinity River of northwestern California.

The Chimariko lived within a region where cultural influences from central California, the Northwest Coast, the Plateau, and the Great Basin overlapped. Motifs from all these regions would be expected in Chimariko oral literature. (See also Traditional narratives (Native California).)

== Sources for Chimariko narratives ==
- Dixon, Roland B. 1910. "The Chimariko Indians and Language". University of California Publications in American Archaeology and Ethnology 5:293-380. Berkeley. (Brief myths, including Theft of Fire, recorded by Alfred L. Kroeber in 1901 and by Dixon in 1906.)
- Luthin, Herbert W. 2002. Surviving through the Days: A California Indian Reader. University of California Press, Berkeley. (Narrative by Sally Noble recorded by John Peabody Harrington in 1921, pp. 115–122.)
