= Grouse Creek (Humboldt County, California) =

Stream in California, United States

Coordinates: 40°43′58″N 123°32′43″W

Grouse Creek in Humboldt County, California is a tributary on the west bank of the South Fork of the Trinity River. Its basin lies approximately 20–25 miles east of Eureka, California.
