= Campbell Creek (California) =

Stream in California, US

Coordinates: 41°01′21″N 123°38′51″W

Campbell Creek is a tributary in rural north Humboldt County, California, near Willow Creek. It flows north into the Trinity River. In 2014 the North Coast regional water board recommended that Campbell Creek be listed and an impaired waterway due to E. coli contamination 600 times greater than normal.

== See also ==
- List of rivers of California
