= Trinity River (California) =

River in northern California

Trinity River Hoopa River
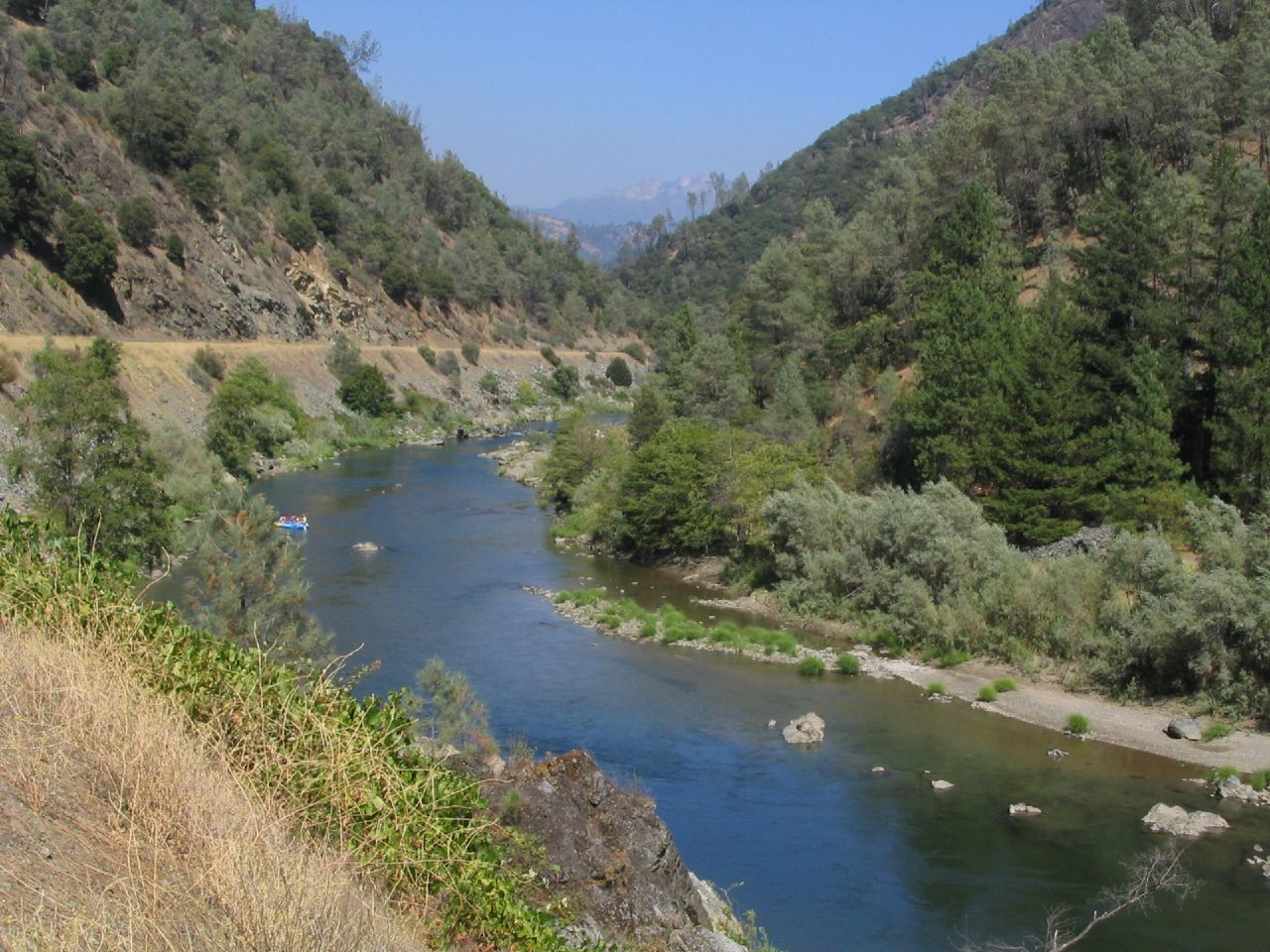
- Trinity River near Weaverville

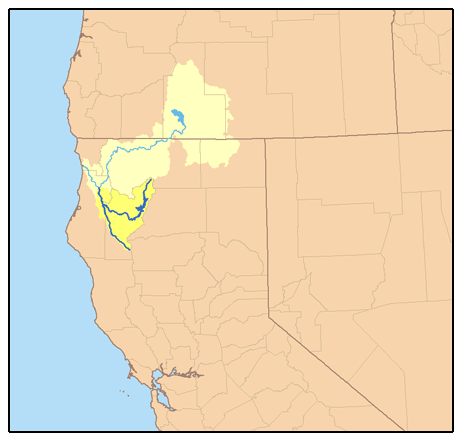
- Map of the Trinity River and Klamath River watersheds. The Trinity River is shown in dark blue, with its watershed highlighted in dark yellow. The South Fork Trinity River extends southward, while the main Trinity River curves east then north.

Location
- Country: United States
- State: California

Physical characteristics
- Source: Scott Mountains
  - location: Trinity County
  - coordinates: 41°19′53″N 122°33′9″W
  - elevation: 5,557 ft (1,694 m) (Note: Source elevation derived from GNIS source coordinates using Geoplaner.)
- Mouth: Klamath River
  - location: Weitchpec
  - coordinates: 41°11′5″N 123°42′31″W
  - elevation: 190 ft (58 m)
- Length: 165 mi (266 km)
- Basin size: 2,936 sq mi (7,600 km^{2})
- Discharge
  - location: Hoopa, about 12.5 mi (20.1 km) from the mouth
  - average: 4,849 cu ft/s (137.3 m^{3}/s)
  - minimum: 162 cu ft/s (4.6 m^{3}/s)
  - maximum: 231,000 cu ft/s (6,500 m^{3}/s)

Basin features
- Tributaries
  - left: East Fork, South Fork
  - right: Stuart Fork, North Fork, New River

National Wild and Scenic River
- Type: Wild, Scenic, Recreational
- Designated: January 19, 1981

The Trinity River (Yurok: Hoopa or Hupa; Hupa: hun) is a major river in northwestern California in the United States and is the principal tributary of the Klamath River. The Trinity flows for 165 miles (266 km) through the Klamath Mountains and Coast Ranges, with a watershed area of nearly 3,000 square miles (7,800 km^{2}) in Trinity and Humboldt Counties. Designated a National Wild and Scenic River, along most of its course the Trinity flows swiftly through tight canyons and mountain meadows.

The river is known for its once prolific runs of anadromous fish, notably Chinook salmon and steelhead, which sustained Native American tribes for thousands of years. Due to its remoteness, the Trinity did not feature prominently in the early European colonization of California, but the gold rush in the mid-1800s brought thousands of gold seekers to the area. The river was named by Major Pierson B. Reading who, upon reaching the river in 1848, mistakenly believed it to flow into the Pacific Ocean at Trinidad Bay. During and after the gold rush, the influx of settlers and miners into the Trinity River country led to conflict with indigenous tribes, many of which saw severe depopulation due to fighting and foreign diseases. In the following decades logging and ranching, combined with mining runoff, significantly changed the river's ecosystem and led to the decline of its fish populations.

The Trinity River is an important water source for irrigation and hydroelectricity generation, as well as a major center of recreational activities such as gold panning, fishing and whitewater rafting. Since 1964 the Trinity River has been dammed to create Trinity Lake, the third largest man-made lake in the state. As much as 90 percent of the upper Trinity River watershed was diverted for agriculture in the Central Valley. In 1991 environmental regulations were enacted, requiring a greater release of water to the Trinity River in order to protect fish. However, the use of Trinity River water remains a contentious issue, especially in years of drought.

== Course ==
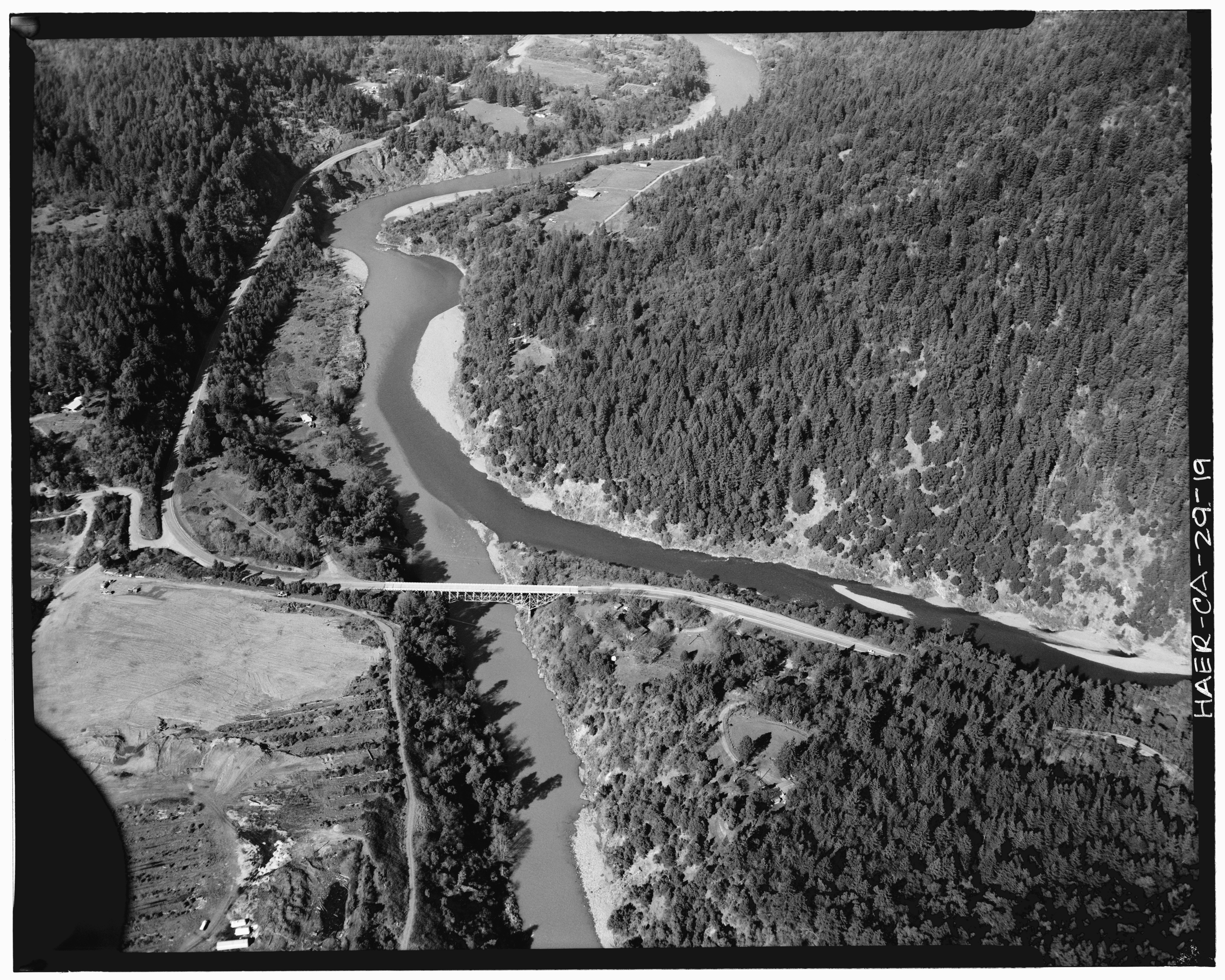
The Trinity River, looking north at Salyer. The silty South Fork joins the river from below.

The Trinity River begins deep in the Scott Mountains, in Trinity County, at the confluence of High Camp Creek and Chilcoot Creek. It flows south through a deep valley between the Trinity Mountains to the east as well as the Salmon Mountains/Trinity Alps and Scott Mountains to the west. The river picks up its first large tributary called Bear Creek near a series of large spring filled meadows roughly one mile from the headwaters. The short but steep Bull Creek comes in just shortly down stream from the West. Cedar Creek is the next major tributary that meets from the East. The river continues to flow in a Southwestern direction picking up numerous tributaries before entering Trinity Lake, a large reservoir created by the Trinity Dam. These tributaries include Picayunne Creek, Nyott Creek, and Sherer Creek, Sunflower Creek, and more. Coffee Creek, the Little Trinity River, Tangle Blue Creek, and Eagle Creek are the largest tributaries above the lake. East Fork and Stuart Fork of the Trinity River also flow into the reservoir along with many other tributaries. Just below Trinity Dam is the smaller Lewiston Dam, which diverts part of the Trinity River through a hydroelectric plant to the Sacramento River Basin as part of the Central Valley Project, providing irrigation water to California's Central Valley.

Below Lewiston Dam the Trinity River passes the towns of Lewiston and receives another large tributary named Grass Valley Creek, before passing Douglas City and turns west, passing within a few miles of Weaverville, the seat of Trinity County and the main population center of the area. It then turns northwest and receives Browns Creek, passes Junction City, and receives Canyon Creek and the North Fork Trinity River at Helena. Further west it passes the former mining settlement of Big Bar and receives Price Creek. It then enters a deep gorge, which provides the route for Highway 299, the principal road connecting Redding to the Humboldt Bay area. At Burnt Ranch it receives the New River from the north. At Salyer the South Fork, its main tributary, enters from the south, nearly doubling the flow.

At the confluence of the South Fork, the Trinity River turns sharply north, entering Humboldt County. It flows through the wider steep-sided namesake valley of the Hoopa Valley Reservation, past the towns of Willow Creek and Hoopa. It joins the Klamath River at Weitchpec, 44 miles (71 km) above the mouth of the larger river on the Pacific Ocean. The confluence marks the point where the Klamath turns from its generally southwesterly course to flow north towards the sea. As the crow flies, Weitchpec is situated about 30 miles (48 km) northeast of Eureka.

The Trinity River is a predominantly rain-fed river, with the highest flows occurring between December and April and the lowest from August through October. The water level can rise quickly in the winter when large Pacific storms strike California's north coast. Almost no precipitation occurs in summer, when the primary source of flow is snowmelt from the higher elevations of the Klamath Mountains and groundwater base flow. In addition, diversion of water to the Central Valley has greatly reduced the total flow of the river since the 1960s, though conversely, a required minimum dam release for protection of migrating salmon results in a flow rate during the dry season that is higher than it naturally would be.

=== Streamflow ===
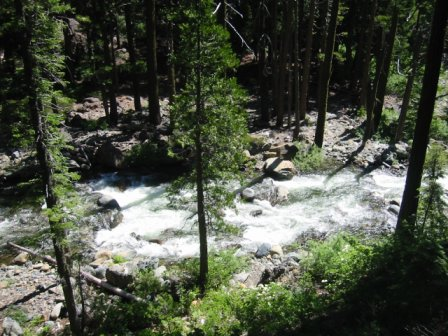
Swift Creek, in the headwaters of the Trinity River, is mostly fed by snowmelt.

The United States Geological Survey (USGS) operates eight real-time stream gages on the Trinity River. The lowermost gage, located at Hoopa, measures runoff from 2,853 square miles (7,390 km^{2}), or 97 percent of the Trinity River watershed. The annual discharge, averaged over the 1964–2013 period, was 4,849 cubic feet per second (137.3 m^{3}/s). The average discharge between 1912 and 1960, prior to construction of Trinity and Lewiston Dams, was 5,618 cubic feet per second (159.1 m^{3}/s). The maximum flow was 231,000 cubic feet per second (6,500 m^{3}/s) on December 22, 1964, during the Christmas flood of 1964, and the lowest was 162 cubic feet per second (4.6 m^{3}/s) on October 4, 1931.

The peak flow in 1964 was greatly attenuated by the Trinity Dam which had just started reservoir filling at the time, perhaps by as much as 100,000 cubic feet per second (2,800 m^{3}/s). However, the record-breaking rains of that winter swelled tributaries below the dam and contributed to a crest fully 20 feet (6.1 m) higher than the second highest peak, recorded in December 1955.

Trinity River monthly mean discharge at Hoopa (cfs) View source data.

The other USGS gages are located at Coffee Creek (above Trinity Lake), below Lewiston Dam, above and below Douglas City, at Junction City, at Helena, and at Burnt Ranch.

== Watershed ==
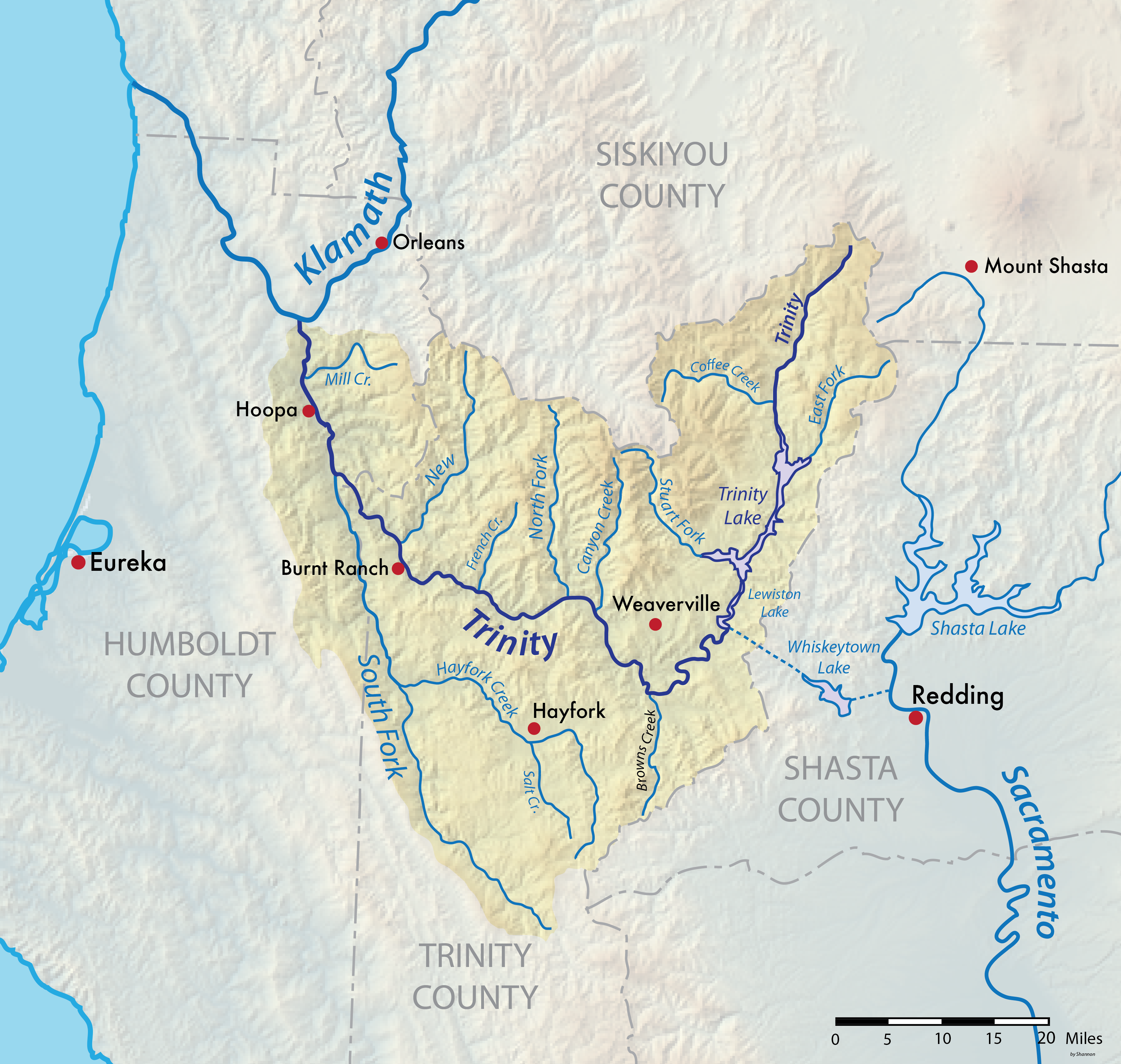
Trinity River watershed

The Trinity River's 2,936-square-mile (7,600 km^{2}) watershed drains a rugged, forested region of California's North Coast. The highest point in the watershed is 8,888-foot (2,709 m) Sawtooth Peak in the Trinity Alps; the elevation is 190 feet (58 m) where the Trinity meets the Klamath River in the town of Salyer. The watershed is almost entirely covered by mountains, with the only level land in a few narrow valleys: the Weaverville basin, and the Hoopa, Hyampom and Hayfork Valleys. The Hayfork Valley is the largest agricultural area in Trinity County, with about 52,000 acres (21,000 ha) of farmland. About 80 percent of the Trinity River watershed is federal land managed by the U.S. Forest Service and the U.S. Bureau of Land Management. The remaining 20 percent are privately owned; about half are owned by logging companies.

The overall climate is Mediterranean, with cool, wet winters and hot, dry summers. Annual precipitation over the Trinity River watershed averages 57 inches (1,400 mm). Precipitation ranges from 37 inches (940 mm) in lowlands around Weaverville and Hayfork, to as high as 85 inches (2,200 mm) in some mountain ranges close to the coast. The high rainfall combined with the rugged geography results in extremely fast runoff and a high risk of flooding during winter storms. Large volumes of rocks and sediment carried by floods are spread along the rivers forming wide alluvial channels. In general, human activities such as mining and road construction have increased the rate of erosion within the watershed and consequentially the amount of sediment carried into the rivers. Dam building has had the opposite effect, by blocking natural sediment sources to a long section of the Trinity River. Both have had notable impacts on river geomorphology, altering the development of riparian zones and fish habitat.

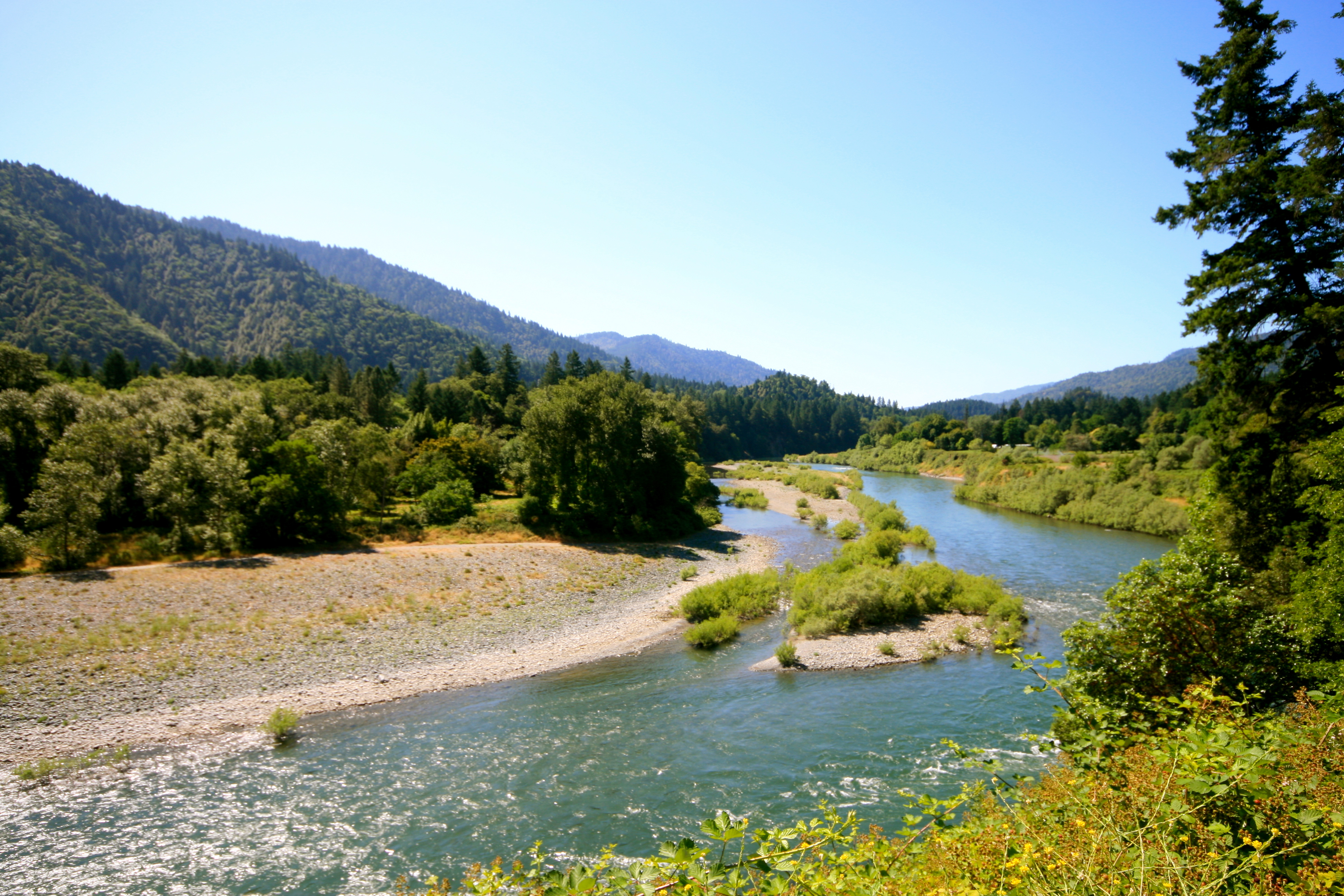
Trinity River near Hoopa

The Trinity River watershed borders several major California drainage basins; these are the Mad River and Redwood Creek to the west, the Salmon River and Scott River (tributaries of the Klamath River) to the north, and Clear Creek and Cottonwood Creek (both tributaries of the Sacramento River) to the east and south, respectively. Fir, oak, and pine forests cover about 92 percent of the watershed. Chaparral and shrubs account for slightly over 5 percent, and grassland and barren land each cover approximately 1 percent. Riparian zones and wetlands encompass 0.5 percent of the watershed. Less than 2 percent of the watershed is urbanized.

About 86 percent of the Trinity River watershed is in Trinity County. As of the 2010 census, the population of Trinity County was 13,786. With a population density of 4.3 people per square mile (1.7/km^{2}) it is one of the least densely populated counties in California. Only 415 square miles (1,070 km^{2}), or about 14 percent of the western part of the basin, is in Humboldt County. The part of the Trinity River watershed in Humboldt County is also sparsely populated, with the exception of the Hoopa Valley Reservation, which was home to 2,930 people as of 2011. Extractive industries such as mining and logging, and to a limited extent farming and ranching, have been the main economic drivers in the Trinity River basin since European settlement in the 1800s. These have declined in part due to increasing environmental regulations. Tourism has been an increasingly important part of the economy especially after the creation of the Trinity Lake reservoir in 1964.

== Geology ==
The lands that make up the Trinity River basin today began to take shape over 200 million years ago by the collision of several exotic terranes – or crustal fragments of the Pacific Plate – with the North American Plate, causing uplift of the sea floor under what is now northwestern California. During the Jurassic and Cretaceous periods, tectonic movement along the plate boundary produced a range of mountains much higher than those found in the area today. Over millions of years these mountains were eroded, then reformed again as the next oceanic terrane collided with the continental crust. This repeating cycle of erosion and orogeny created the complex "jumble of different rock types" that characterizes the region today. Rocks commonly found in the Trinity River area include gabbro, chert, granite, diorite, limestone, sandstone, serpentine, schist and marble. Gold-bearing quartz veins are widespread in local metamorphic rock formations; the richness of the area made it among the focal points of the California Gold Rush.

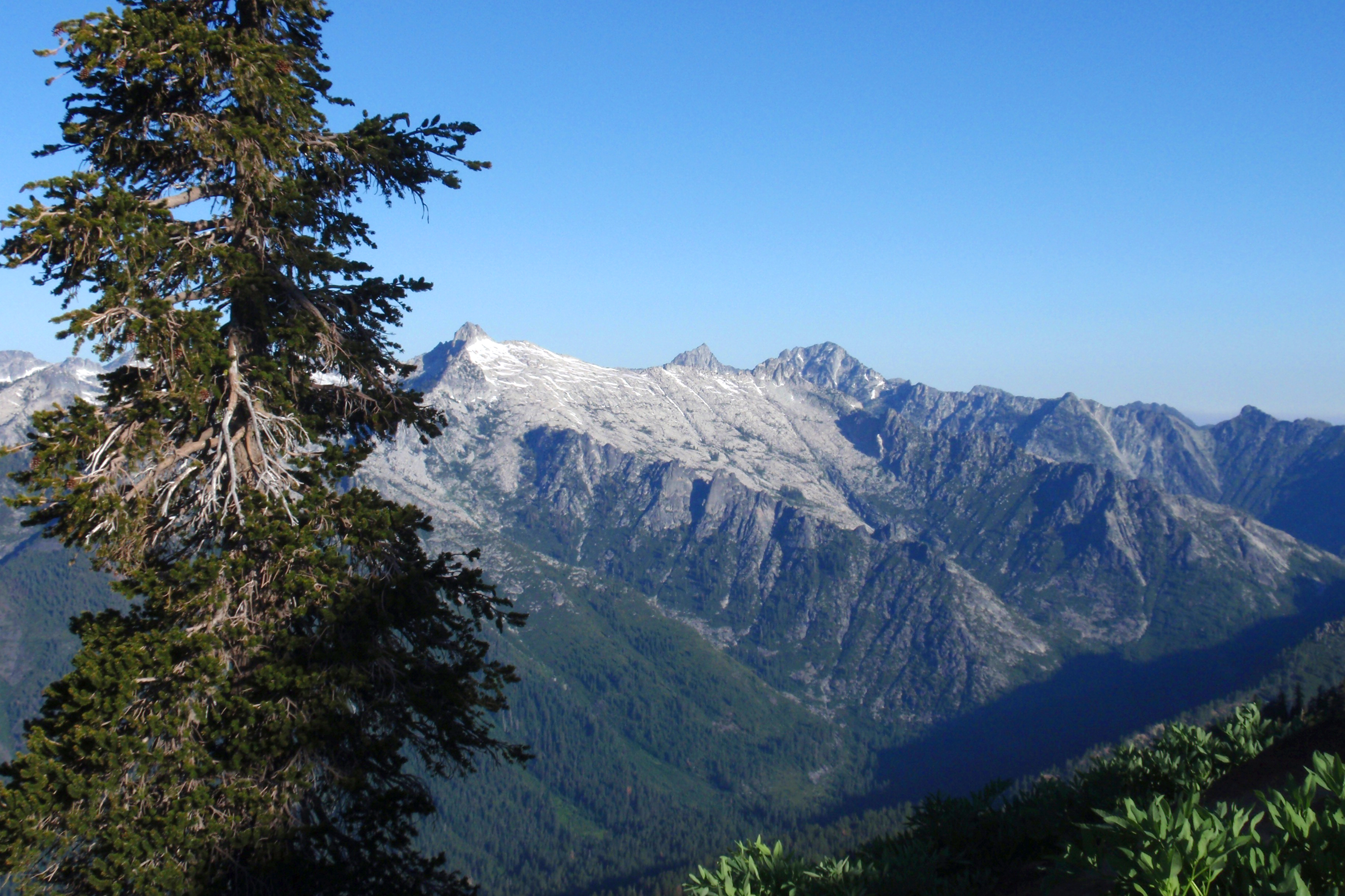
Trinity Alps west of Trinity Lake

The Klamath Mountains, which make up the eastern part of the watershed are quite young in geologic terms, no more than 2 or 3 million years old. The present shape of the mountains was highly influenced by underground volcanic activity, which created batholiths, domes of igneous rock formed by cooled magma. They raised the elevation of the terrain above and created the widespread granite and diorite formations found in the area today. The higher mountains, including the Trinity Alps – the highest range in northwest California – were also sculpted by glaciation during successive Ice Ages, the last of which ended roughly 10,000 years ago. Glacial erosion produced numerous granite outcroppings, tarns, cirques and knife-edged ridges. Remnants of these glaciers, or "glacierets", are still extant in the higher valleys.

The Coast Ranges pass through the western part of the Trinity River Basin and consist of even younger rock formations, chiefly the Franciscan Assemblage. The Franciscan formation consists of more unstable sedimentary and igneous rocks and soils that are highly breakable and prone to erosion. They formed even more recently in geologic history than the Klamath Mountains, primarily due to uplift along the Cascadia subduction zone. The Natural Resources Conservation Service refers to the Franciscan assemblage as a "nightmare of rocks" due to its complex and fragmented layers. The most common type of rock is greywacke, followed by other types of sandstones and shales. Landslides and mass wasting are common in this region due to erosion as well as earthquakes.

== History ==
=== Native Americans ===
An archaeological site on the Trinity River at Cox Bar, with spear points dating from 3000 to 6000 BC, has some of the oldest evidence of human habitation in Northern California. This site is believed to be part of the early Borax Lake Pattern culture. Archaeological evidence in the Whiskeytown area also indicates human presence as early as 5000 BC, although it is uncertain at what point the ancestors of modern Native American tribes arrived here.

The Wintu people are the first recorded indigenous group in the Trinity River area. Their traditional lands included much of the upper (eastern) Trinity River in the present day area of Shasta-Trinity National Forest. There were nine major groups of Wintu spread across the Trinity, Upper Sacramento, and McCloud River valleys as well as parts of the South Fork Trinity River and its tributary Hayfork Creek. The Trinity River Wintu were known as nomsu's ("those being west"), and the Hayfork Wintu as norelmaq ("south-uphill people"). Many Wintu villages were located along the Trinity River, and were home to up to 150 people. Each village operated as an independent unit led by a chief, although the villagers interacted frequently through trade with each other as well as neighboring tribes, such as the Nomlaki, Achomawi and Shasta.

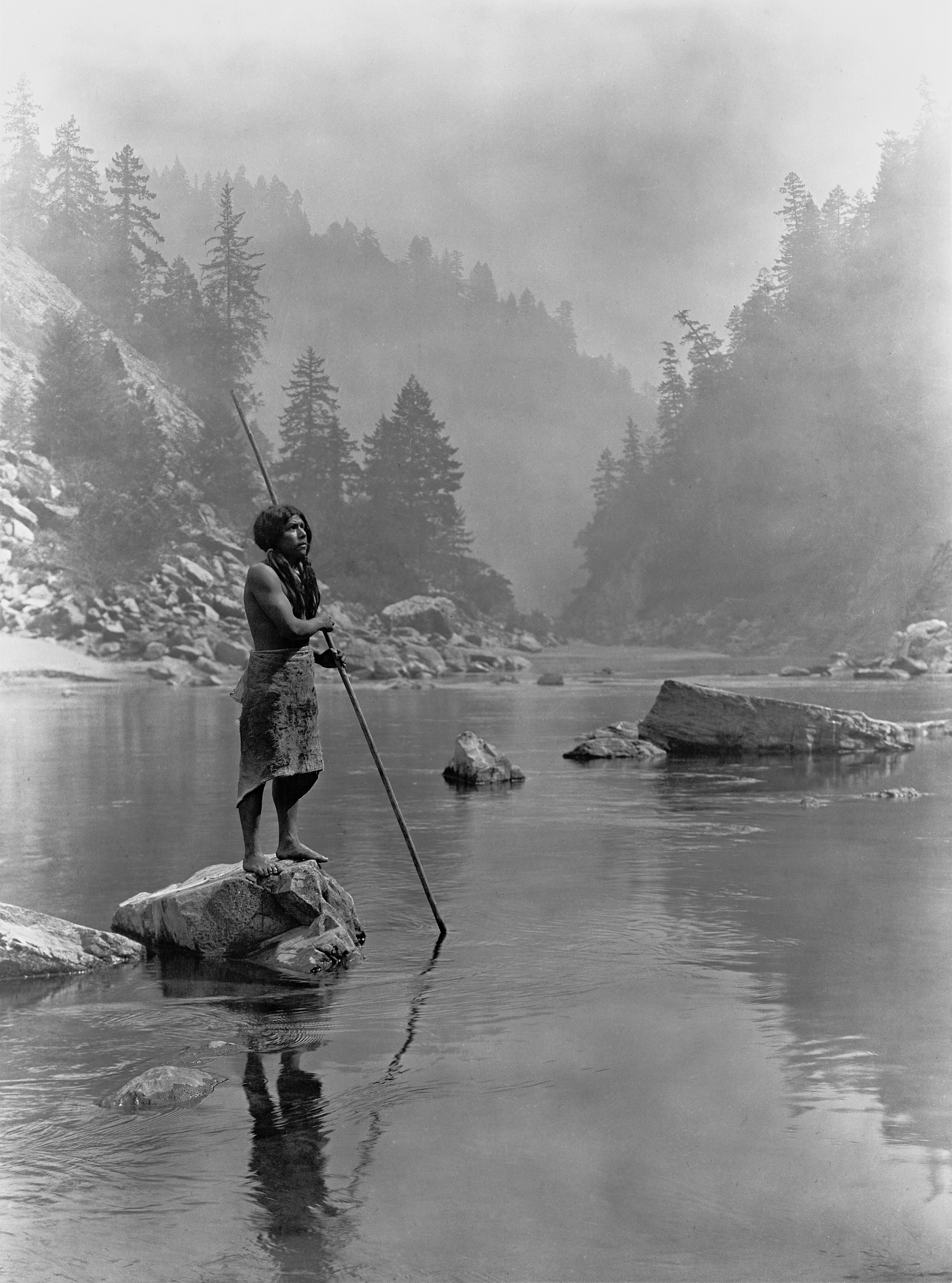
A Hupa man fishes at the "Sugar Bowl" rapids on the Trinity River, c. 1923.

Since about 1000 A.D. the lower Trinity River has been inhabited by the Natinixwe, now known as the Hupa people. Natinixwe is an endonym meaning "people of the place where the trails return". Their name for the Trinity River was hun' simply meaning "river". The name "Hupa" or "Hoopa" appears to originate from the Yurok word for the Trinity River country, hopah, which was first recorded by ethnologist George Gibbs in 1852.

The Hupa lived in the fertile Hoopa Valley along the Trinity River and the Hyampom Valley on the South Fork – some of the few flat lands in a region otherwise dominated by rugged mountains. A Yurok village called Weitspus stood at the site of present-day Weitchpec at the confluence of the Trinity and Klamath Rivers. The Hupa traded with the coastal Yurok and Karok by using canoes to navigate the Trinity and Klamath Rivers. The trade arrangements with neighboring tribes were complex and involved the use of dentalium shells as currency.

The Tsnungwe people, also known as the South Fork Hupa, lived pre-contact in the South Fork of the Trinity River area and Burnt Ranch/New River area. After the Gold Rush of 1849, many years of battles occurred between the Trinity River Indians and the miners/soldiers. Most surviving Tsnungwe were taken to the Hoopa Valley Indian Reservation. By 1900, a Tsnungwe community had re-established around the ancient principal village of łe:lding at the mouth of the South Fork of the Trinity River. The tribe is still surviving there today and is recognized by both Humboldt County and Trinity County. The federal government considers the Tsnungwe to be a "previously recognized" tribe. The Tsnungwe Council is working towards having their federally recognized tribal status restored.

The Chimariko people lived along the Trinity River (Chimariko: 'aqʰaqʰut) canyon near its confluence with the New River (č'altasom 'aqʰa). They were enemies of the Hupa, but had friendly relations with the Wintu. The now extinct Chimariko language was of Northern Hokan origin, in contrast to the Athabaskan dialect of the Hupa and the Wintuan languages spoken by the Wintu. Carl Waldman describes in Encyclopedia of Native American Tribes (2014) that "the Chimariko occupied one of the smallest homelands, if not the smallest, of any distinct linguistic group in North America."

The abundant salmon, steelhead and sturgeon runs in the Trinity River were central to the lives of indigenous peoples along the entire length of the river. Fishing provided their primary sustenance as well as goods for trade. Prior to the arrival of Europeans, native peoples took as much as 2,000,000 pounds (910,000 kg) of salmon from the Trinity River each year. Native peoples also made meal of berries, seeds and acorns, and hunted game animals such as deer and elk that were drawn to the Trinity River.

Due to their proximity to trade routes in and around the Central Valley, the Wintu came into frequent contact with European explorers, traders and settlers. These initial meetings were peaceful, but the Wintu population – along with many other Central Valley tribes – were decimated by a malaria epidemic in the 1830s, accidentally introduced by Hudson's Bay Company fur trappers. In the following decades the remaining Wintu became embroiled in conflict as prospectors and settlers occupied their traditional lands. Some of these conflicts ended in deadly massacres. In 1846, one of the bloodiest single encounters occurred when soldiers led by John C. Frémont killed 175 Wintu, Maidu and Yana. In 1850 about 100 Trinity Wintu perished after being given poisoned food by white settlers. By 1910 the Wintu population had been reduced to about 1,000, from an estimated 12,000 prior to European contact.

The Chimariko also suffered heavily when European prospectors entered the region in the 19th century searching for gold. After clashing with the Europeans, many members of the tribe were dispersed to Shasta territory or killed. Some returned to the Trinity River in the late 19th century, after the gold seekers had left. People of Chimariko ancestry continue to live in the region, although the tribe functionally no longer exists.

Because of the geographic isolation of their homeland, the Hupa had few interactions with early European explorers, although they later came in conflict with miners looking for gold. Even after California became a US state in 1850, the Hupa continued to live on their traditional lands and were eventually granted a reservation here in 1876. They are the only Native American group in California to retain most of their original territory; today, the Hoopa Valley Reservation is the largest and most populous in the state.

=== Explorers ===
Jedediah Smith's expedition to northwestern California in 1828 were some of the first Europeans to set foot in the Trinity River country. After departing from the Sacramento Valley Smith passed over the Klamath Mountains and arrived at what is probably now Hayfork Creek on April 18. They followed the creek to the South Fork and from there to the Trinity River and the Klamath River. After following the Klamath to the Pacific, they traveled north towards Oregon, thus becoming the first white men to travel from inland California to coastal Oregon. Smith and his party traded with the Hupas and Yuroks in the area and their encounters were generally friendly. Early maps of the area label the South Fork, the lower Trinity and the lower Klamath as "Smith's River". The name was later applied to the Smith River further north, which Smith also crossed on the same expedition. Harrison Rogers, a member of Smith's party, called the Trinity "Indian Scalp River" although the reason for this name is unknown.

The Old Trinity Trail, which crosses the mountains between Redding and Weaverville (approximately where State Route 299 is today) was used by Native Americans for generations before Europeans came to the area. Hudson's Bay Company fur trappers may have used this route in search of beaver as early as the 1830s and 1840s; trapping was common in the area until about 1845. The trail pioneered by Smith was also used by fur trappers, including mountain man Ewing Young in 1832. Today part of the trail also forms the route of California State Route 36. Major Pierson B. Reading (for whom the present city of Redding is named) explored the upper Trinity area in 1845 and is credited with the modern name of the river. Reading mistakenly thought that the Trinity flowed west to empty into the Pacific Ocean at Trinidad Bay. In 1849 prospectors confirmed the actual path of the river to flow into what, twenty years earlier had been called "Smith's River"; however, Reading's name stuck.

=== Gold Rush ===
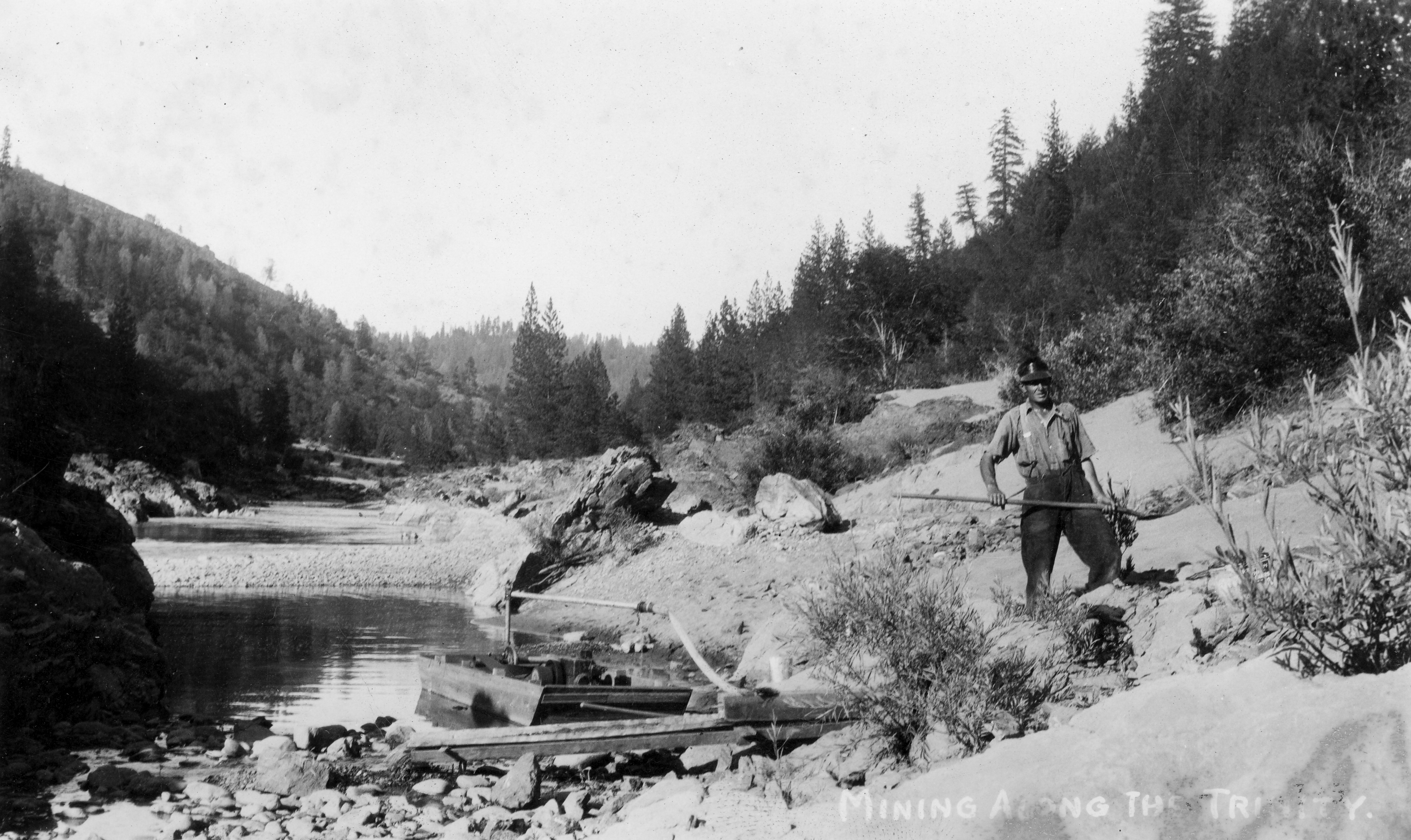
An early gold miner along the Trinity River

In July 1848, not too long after James Marshall's famous gold find at Sutter's Mill – which started the California Gold Rush – Major Reading discovered gold on the Trinity River. The find attracted thousands of miners to the area and created boomtowns such as Douglas City, Francis, Hoboken, Lake City, Lewiston, Junction City and Quimby. Weaverville, located at the end of the trail Reading had established from the Sacramento Valley to the Trinity, prospered as the main trade center through which gold was exchanged for imported supplies and services. The initial discoveries were placer deposits, carried by the river to settle in gravel bars. The Trinity River gold rush is also noted for the large number of Chinese miners attracted to the area, as many as 2,500 by 1854. Many of the Chinese were from the Pearl River Delta (Guangdong region).

Mining activity was initially concentrated in the eastern (upper) valleys of the Trinity River around Weaverville, as the hostile Native Americans and treacherous gorges around Burnt Ranch precluded the transport of rations and equipment to places further west. For about two decades the area was extremely productive, second only to the Sierra Nevada (the Mother Lode) itself. The rate at which gold was extracted, and new methods pioneered to access the harder to reach deposits, was feverish. Author James Hilton remarked that Weaverville was a "Shangri-La, that strange and wonderful somewhere which is not a place but a state of mind." The area was soon profiting $1.5 million a year, with hundreds of claims along the Trinity River equipped with flumes, waterwheels and other apparatus to separate fine gold from river gravel.

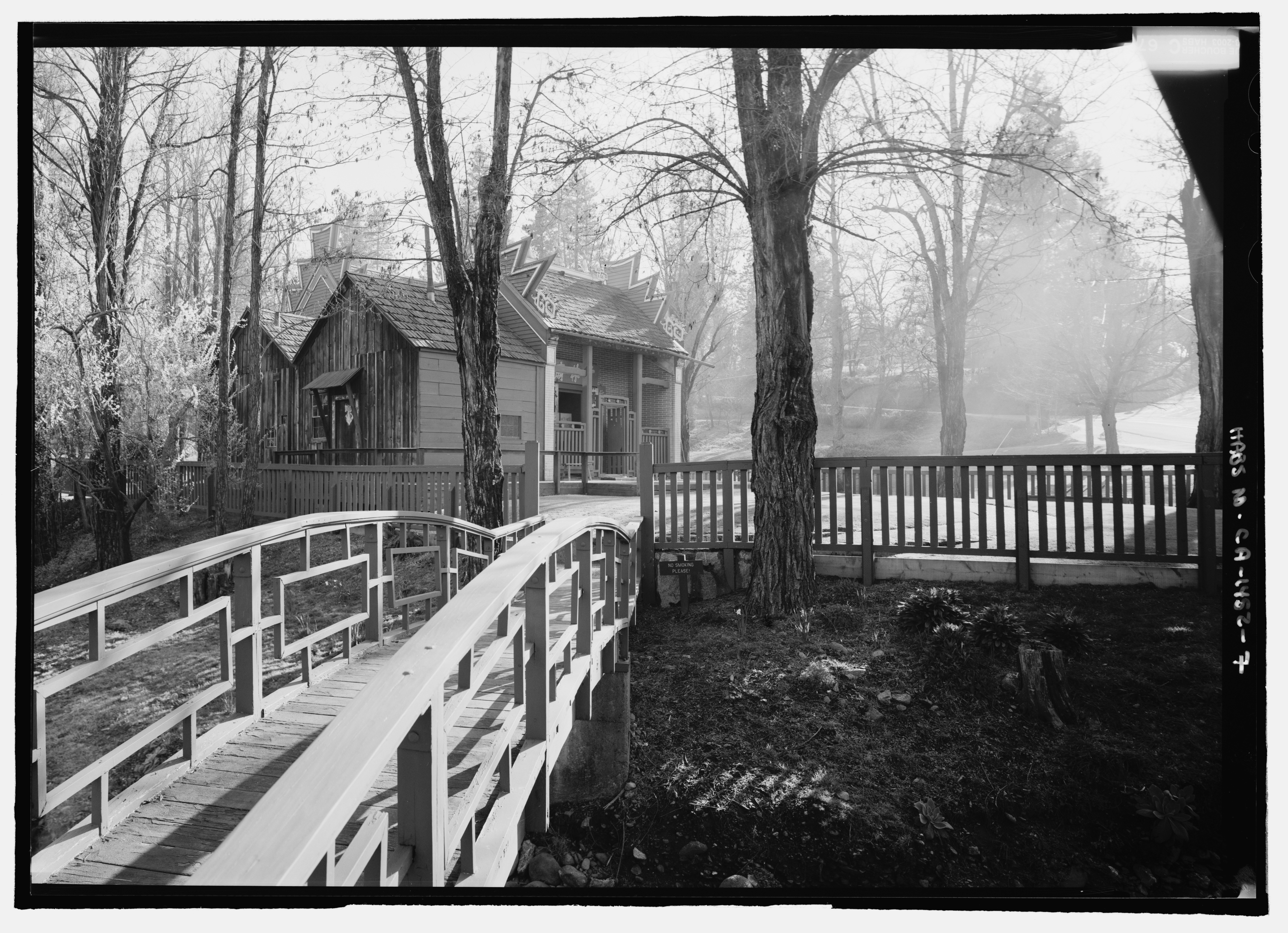
Weaverville Joss House is a Taoist temple built in 1874 by Chinese gold miners who settled in the Trinity River area.

The Great Flood of 1862 largely obliterated the placer mining claims along this part of the Trinity River, spurring prospectors to push west, establishing a pack trail to the area around the New River and the South Fork of the Trinity. In fact, the New River was named thusly for being a "new" river to explore for gold. Although the river gold petered out by the 1870s, lode gold was discovered in the 1880s in the mountains above the Trinity River country. Because hard rock mining was required to access the gold bearing veins, new industries such as iron forges and stamp mills prospered in the region.

Another profitable way to access gold was hydraulic mining operations, which sprang up across the Trinity River country starting in the 1860s. At one point, there were 307 hydraulic mines in Trinity County alone, of which 145 were "fully operational", all of which depended on the use of pressurized water to demolish hillsides in search of gold bearing ore. This had an enormous impact on the landscape – leveling forests, carving huge gullies and burying streambeds under dozens of feet of sediment – which still characterizes the area today. Elaborate flume, reservoir and tunnel systems were built to supply the massive quantities of water required by these "hydraulicking" operations.

The La Grange Mine which began operating in 1862 on Oregon Gulch, a small creek that flows into the Trinity, was the biggest hydraulic mine in California, covering over 3,000 acres (1,200 ha). Tailings washed from this single mine buried the valley, the creek and the entire town of Oregon Gulch (which had been purchased by the mine owners in anticipation of this) under a staggering 110 million cubic yards (84,000,000 m^{3}) of sediment. This is equal to thirty times the volume of the Great Pyramid of Giza.

=== Post-Gold Rush settlement ===
In 1884 the California legislature banned hydraulic mining as the flow of tailings from hydraulic mines in the Sierra Nevada was silting up the Sacramento River, making it unnavigable. However, the Trinity hydraulic mines escaped this ban, as the remote and swift flowing Trinity River was not considered a navigable watercourse. Nevertheless, the largest deposits had been played out by the 1920s, and the mining settlements were abandoned or fell into decline. This brought on the last stage of commercial gold mining along the Trinity, as floating dredges (called "doodle-bugs" by the miners) were used to turn over the river bottoms that had been inaccessible by the placer miners a half-century earlier. After World War II commercial dredges continued to operate on the Trinity, but at a reduced scale, finally ending in 1959, when the last claim was bought by the federal government in preparation for dam construction of the Central Valley Project.

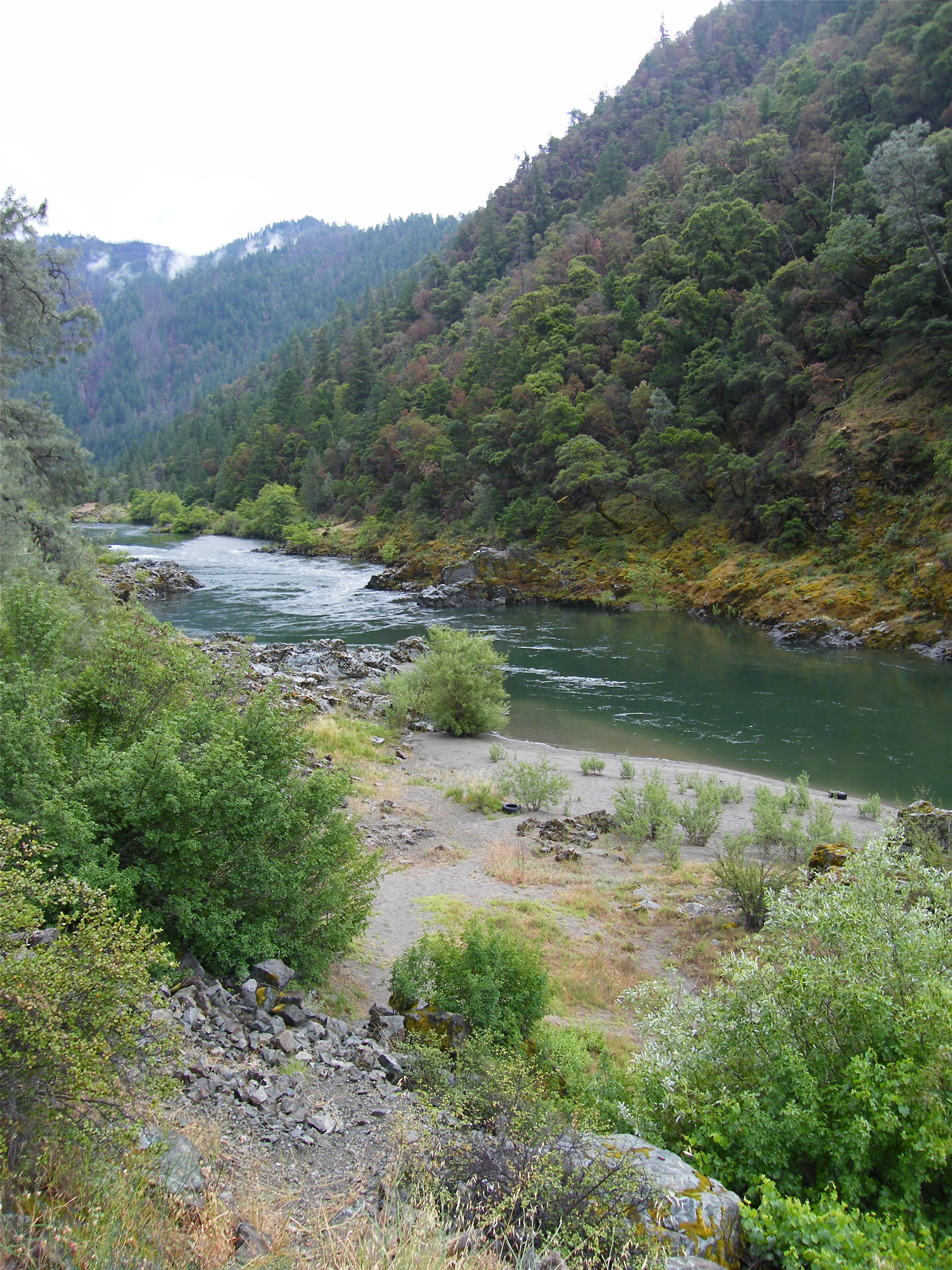
The lower Trinity River

Although most of the miners left, either to return home or settle elsewhere, some stayed to work in the ranching and logging industries that became the economic mainstay of the Trinity River area. Some also continued to search for gold long after the major deposits were gone; even today, recreational gold panning remains a popular activity along the Trinity. One Mr. Jorstad who had been mining in the Trinity River country since the 1930s, continued to live in a small cabin at Pfeiffer Flat on the North Fork until his death in 1989. Jorstad's cabin was an important rest stop for miners, hunters, hikers and fishermen along the North Fork for many years; it remains as a historical site maintained by the Forest Service.

Although settlers had been farming and ranching in the Trinity River valley since the beginning of the gold rush, the number greatly increased after the gold rush when miners decided to settle down and homestead in the area. One of the major ranching areas was the wide valley known as Trinity Meadows, which is now flooded by Trinity Lake. The Webber family bought a ranch along the Stuart Fork in 1922 and established a resort. Having traveled in Europe, the Webbers thought the area resembled the Austrian Alps, and so named the mountains along the upper Trinity River the "Trinity Alps". During the 1870s, the Southern Pacific Railroad was extended from Sacramento through Redding and would eventually reach Oregon, making travel to the area easier than ever before.

Commercial logging had also been operating for years in the Trinity River country, but most of the timber produced was used locally. After World War II, logging greatly increased both due to high demand for housing domestically and abroad, and the introduction of more advanced technologies. In 1959 alone, loggers took 439 million board feet from Trinity County. The rate dropped after that, but logging continued at 200–300 million board feet per year well into the 1980s. Many logged areas were on steep mountains, and improper construction of roads and skid trails exposed slopes to erosion and landslides. In 1988 several environmentalist groups including the Wilderness Society, Audubon Society and Sierra Club filed a lawsuit against the Forest Service, preventing the cutting of 18.4 million board feet of salvage lumber in an area with particularly high erosion risk. This generated pushback in the local timber industry, whose decline has partly been attributed to more stringent environmental regulations.

=== Central Valley Project ===
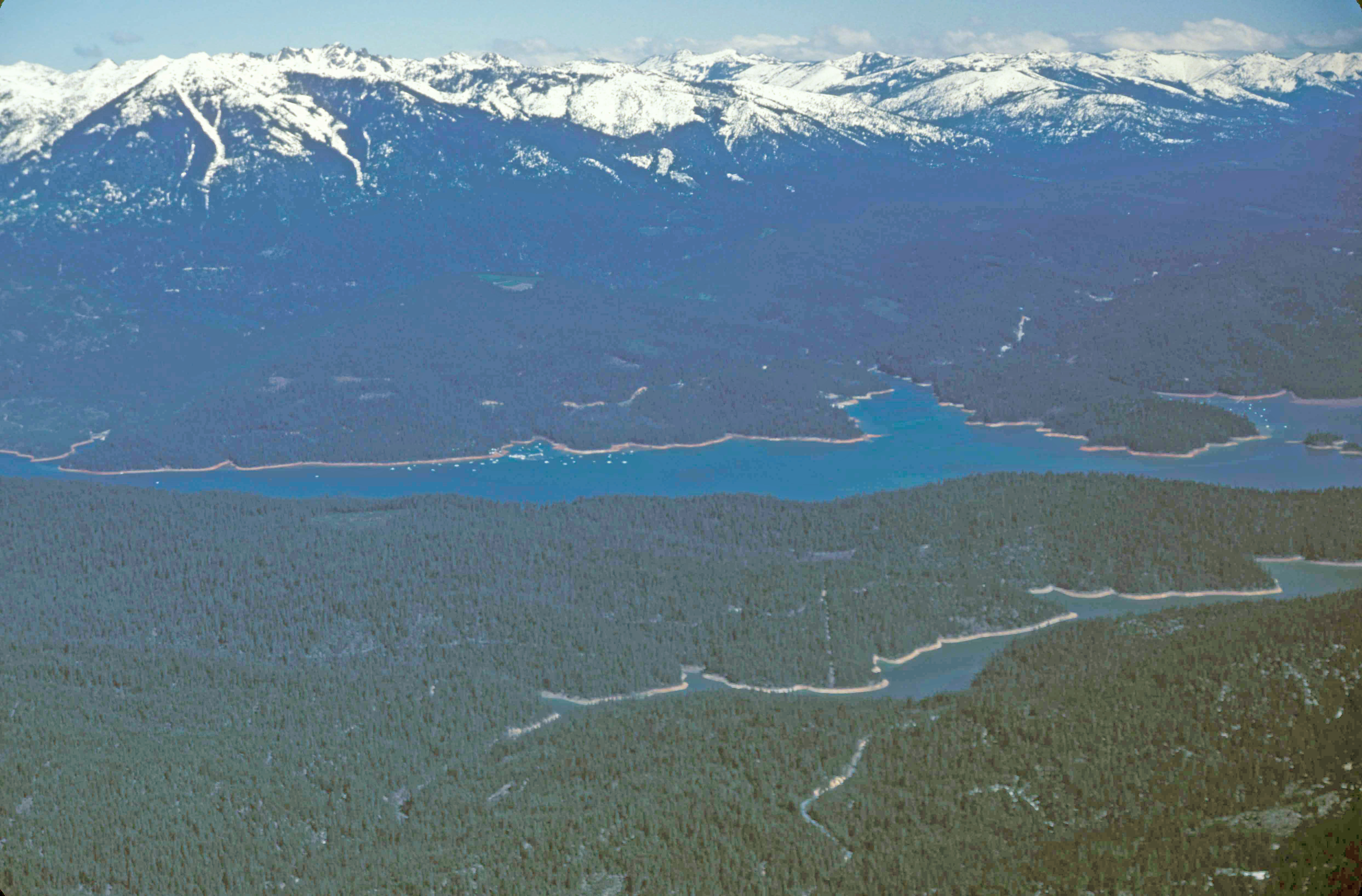
Stuart Fork arm of Trinity Lake and the Trinity Alps

As early as the 1930s, the state of California had floated the idea of diverting water from the rainy north to support irrigation in the fertile, but dry San Joaquin Valley. A diversion of the Trinity River was contemplated in order to boost the available water supply for the Central Valley watershed, but planners eventually determined that the extra water was not yet needed. The U.S. Bureau of Reclamation took over the Central Valley Project from the bankrupt state of California during the Great Depression in 1933 as a federal public works project, and in 1942 it began investigations to dam the Trinity River. However, the Trinity River plan was dropped in 1945, after the completion of nearby Shasta Dam.

As the 1950s began, demand on the Colorado River – which forms the border of California and Arizona and provided most of Southern California's water – was moving toward unsustainable levels. The Bureau of Reclamation restarted its surveys of the Trinity River basin as part of a larger proposal to move water from northern to southern parts of the state, and compensate for the shortages on the Colorado. The United Western Investigation, in 1951, proposed the damming of nearly every river in the North Coast region of California, chiefly the Trinity, Klamath and Eel. The Ah Pah Dam would have flooded the canyons of the Klamath and Trinity Rivers to form the largest reservoir in California. These grandiose plans culminated in the Pacific Southwest Water Plan of 1964, which sought to comprehensively link the water systems of California and the rest of the Colorado River Basin. One of the key projects was an aqueduct to transport North Coast water to the Imperial Valley, reducing its reliance on water from the Colorado River. However, with the exception of the upper Trinity River project, none of these dam and diversion projects were ever realized.

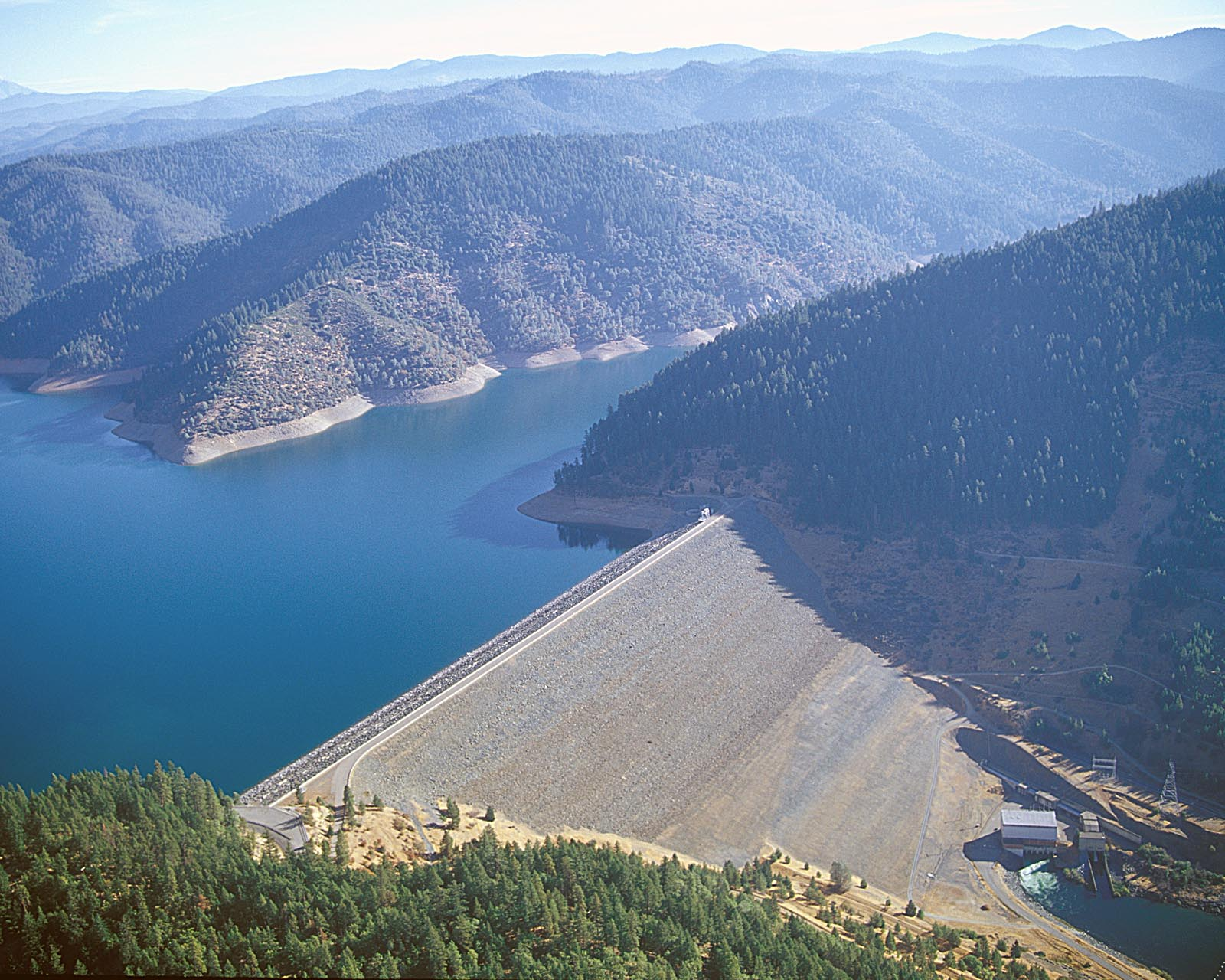
Trinity Dam

The Trinity River project was first drafted on October 1, 1951, and authorized by Congress on January 2, 1953, as the Trinity River Division of the Central Valley Project. In 1955 Congress authorized an annual diversion of 704,000 acre-feet (0.868 km^{3}) of water (56 percent of total flow) from the Trinity River, stating that the water could be exported "without detrimental effect on the fishery resources" of the Trinity. In 1957 the Bureau of Reclamation revised the export volume to 865,000 acre-feet (1.067 km^{3}). Construction of Trinity Dam started in 1956 and was completed on December 23, 1963. The reservoir was originally named "Clair Engle Lake" to commemorate United States Senator Clair Engle, who played a crucial role in shepherding the Trinity bill through Congress; however, the name proved unpopular with locals, and it was changed to Trinity Lake in 1997.

Trinity Dam, an earth embankment structure 538 feet (164 m) high, was the tallest embankment dam in the world at its completion in 1962 (it was surpassed by Oroville Dam, also in California, in 1968). Trinity Lake can store a maximum of 2,447,650 acre-feet (3.01913 km^{3}), or about twice the Trinity River's flow at this point. Below Trinity Dam is the much smaller Lewiston Dam, the actual point at which the water is diverted. The 10.7-mile (17.2 km) Clear Creek Tunnel conveys water under the Trinity Mountains to the Whiskeytown Lake reservoir, and from there it flows 2.4 miles (3.9 km) through the Spring Creek Tunnel to join the Sacramento River at Keswick Dam. Along the way the water drops some 1,500 feet (460 m) through three hydroelectric plants, generating nearly one billion kilowatt hours each year. Water flow data for the Judge Francis Carr hydroelectric station located at the end of Trinity Tunnel indicates an annual average of 1,257 cubic feet per second (35.6 m^{3}/s), or 910,700 acre-feet (1.1233 km^{3}), diverted from the river between 1963 and 2013.

The filling of the reservoir flooded the town of Trinity Center, one of the original main population centers of Trinity County, as well as the smaller communities of Stringtown and Minersville. Residents of the Trinity River valley were heavily opposed to the dam, but they had no recourse against eminent domain used by the federal government (although property owners were paid for their land). Many buildings in Trinity Center were moved to a new location on the western shore of the reservoir. The dam blocked salmon runs to 109 miles (175 km) of habitat in the upper Trinity River basin, destroying the fishing economy that had sustained local people for generations.

Other residents welcomed the dam project for the economic benefits it would bring via hydropower and tourism, as the gold mining industry that had long supported the region was greatly diminished by the 1950s. By 1986 tourism in the Trinity River country accounted for 50–75 percent of business in the summer and 25 percent in the winter. Many locals remained "so bitter about the dam that they tore down signs and misdirected tourists" for many years after the dam was built.

== Ecology ==
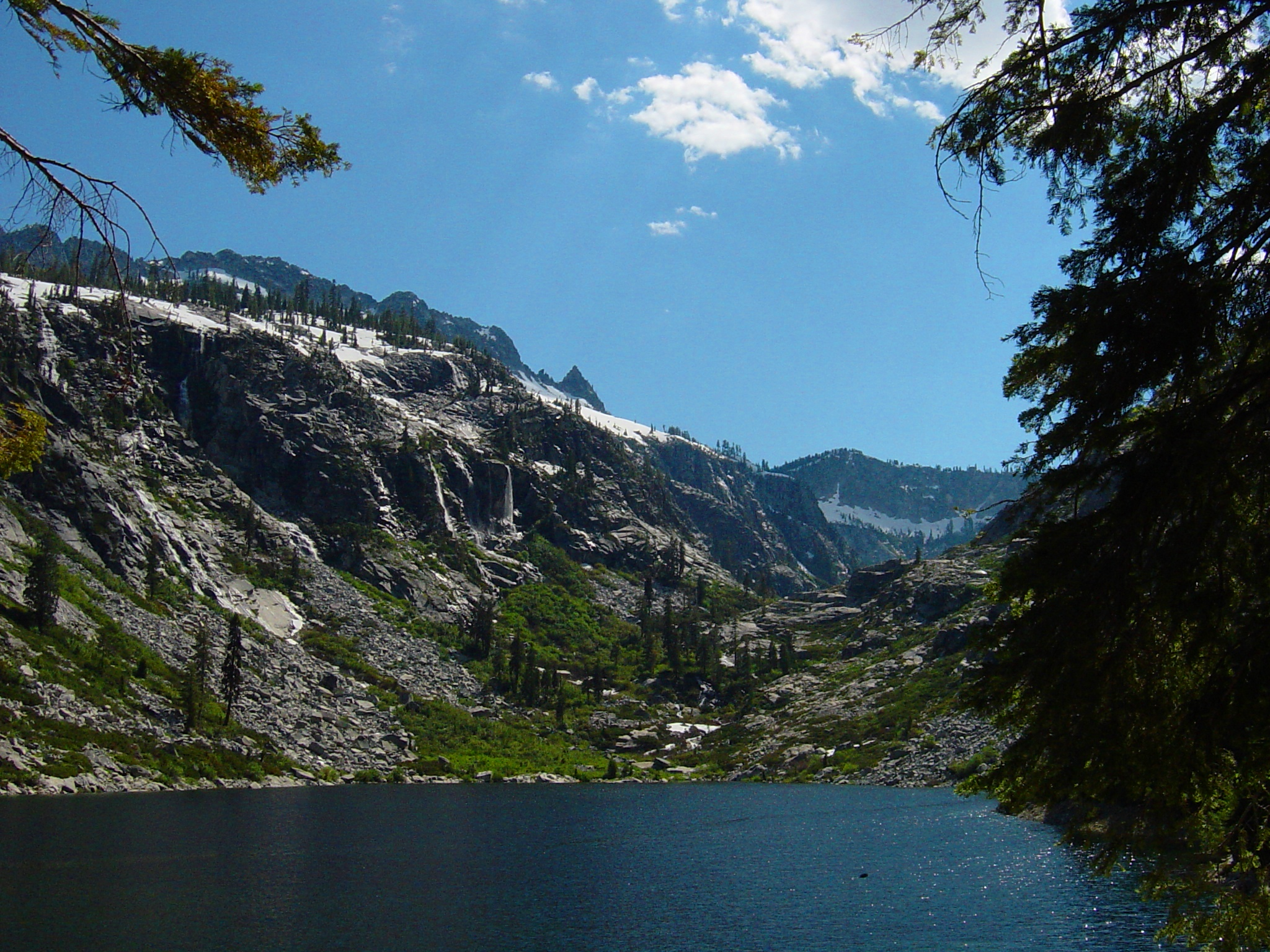
Emerald Lake, located at the headwaters of the Stuart Fork

With the exception of rocky alpine regions in the highest mountains, the Trinity River watershed is almost entirely forested. Mixed coniferous (fir and pine) forests dominate the landscape at elevations of up to 6,000 feet (1,800 m). Common tree species include ponderosa pine, Jeffrey pine, Douglas fir, white fir, red fir, sugar pine, knobcone pine and incense cedar. The watershed also includes some hardwood forests, typically located along canyon bottoms and streams, which are home to California black oak (Quercus kelloggii), madrone, tanbark oak, canyon live oak and bigleaf maple. Stands of Port Orford cedar are common along the upper Trinity River; Oregon white oak is widespread throughout lower elevations. Fir forests comprise almost 74 percent of the forests in the Trinity River watershed; pine and hardwoods account for 13 percent each. There are also limited amounts of chaparral, brush and grass/rangeland within the basin. Wildfires are common in the dry summers which receive little to no precipitation, aside from the occasional high elevation thunderstorm.

The Shasta-Trinity National Forest encompasses nearly the entire Trinity River watershed with the exception of private inholdings and the small area in Humboldt County. Large mammals found in the national forest include black bear, mountain lion, bobcat, coyote, gray fox, Columbian black-tailed deer (mule deer), and elk. River otters inhabit most streams. Other mammals include ringtails, raccoons, skunks, jackrabbits, martens and many squirrel and rat species including northern flying squirrel. Several species of bats are also found in the watershed, little brown bats being the most common. The area around Trinity Lake has a significant nesting bald eagle population.

Beaver also inhabit the Trinity River watershed although their numbers were much higher before fur trappers came to the area. In 1828, the Jedediah Smith expedition was helped across the Trinity River by the Yurok and camped on the east side of the Trinity River. His clerk, Harrison G. Rogers wrote, "Mr. Smith purchases all the beaver furs he can from them", suggesting that beaver were then plentiful on the Trinity or at least in the surrounding area.

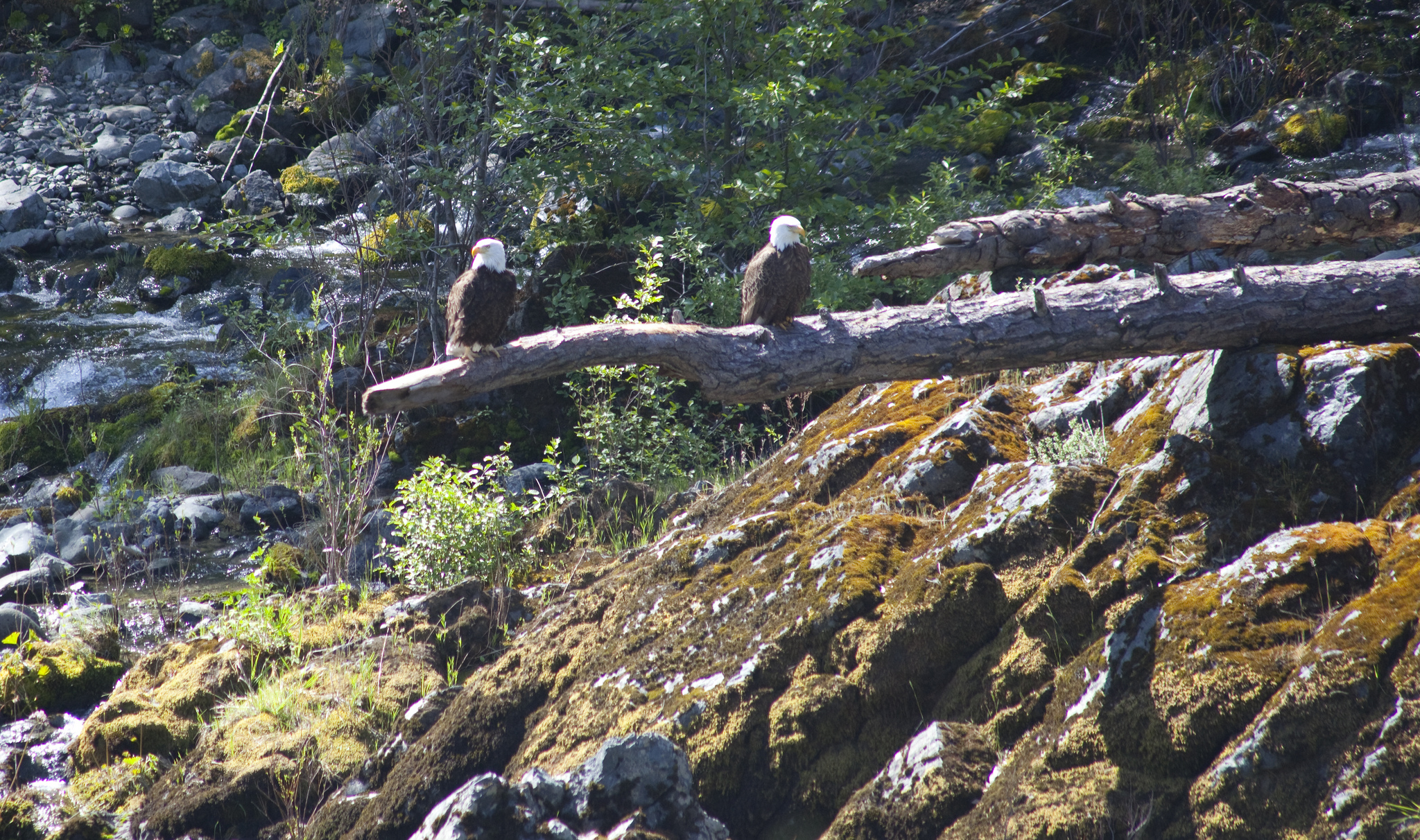
A pair of bald eagles along the Trinity River

The Trinity River was once known for its prolific anadromous fish (salmon, steelhead and sturgeon) runs. The actual number of fish returning to the river each year to spawn, prior to European settlement, is uncertain due to the lack of records. During the first half of the 20th century, before damming, the fall chinook salmon run was estimated at anywhere between 19,000 and 75,500. The spring chinook and coho salmon runs were about 10,000 each and the annual steelhead run was about 50,000.

Forest and river habitats in the watershed have been heavily affected by human activities ever since Gold Rush mining began in the 1800s. Commercial logging has caused mountain slopes to become more prone to erosion; even in areas that are no longer logged and have seen secondary forest growth, abandoned logging roads pose a serious erosive threat. Grazing of livestock has also degraded grasslands and exposed soils to runoff. This has resulted in river channels becoming clogged and confined by sediment, harming salmon and steelhead populations by burying gravel bars used by these fish for spawning. Along the South Fork, this problem has been exacerbated by the inherently unstable rocks and soils of the Franciscan formation, causing mass wasting events that dump sediment into streams.

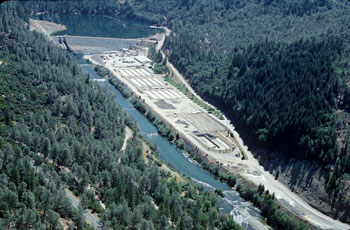
Lewiston Dam blocks fish migration to the upper Trinity River. The Trinity River Fish Hatchery is located below the dam.

After the Trinity and Lewiston Dams were complete, the Bureau of Reclamation did not adhere to the water export limits set in the project's authorization, diverting 72 percent of the total river flow and as much as 90 percent at certain times. On the main stem, dam construction has greatly reduced the capacity of the river to wash away excess sediment. The annual chinook salmon run has dropped by almost 80 percent since the 1950s. In 2002, 65,000 adult salmon perished in a fish kill on the lower Trinity and Klamath rivers (the fish were mostly of Trinity stock).

The Trinity River Division has also indirectly caused environmental impacts in other parts of California. Because no aqueduct or pipeline linking to the Imperial Valley or Colorado Basin was ever built, Trinity River water was and still is used in the Central Valley for irrigation. Most of it was used to develop new irrigation in the 600,000-acre (240,000 ha) Westlands Water District on the western side of the San Joaquin Valley, which contains soils laced with salt and selenium. In the 1980s, water run-off from the Westlands district contributed to the highly publicized contamination of Kesterson Reservoir, part of the agricultural drainage system and a significant refuge for birds and wildlife.

After the completion of Lewiston Dam in 1963, the Bureau of Reclamation constructed the Trinity River Fish Hatchery to raise young steelhead, coho and chinook salmon. The primary purpose of the hatchery was to compensate for the loss of 109 miles (175 km) of anadromous fish habitat above Lewiston Dam. The hatchery is operated by the California Department of Fish and Wildlife to produce returns of 7,500 coho, 6,000 spring chinook, 70,000 fall chinook and 22,000 steelhead each year. In 2014, the California Fish Hatchery Review Project found that Trinity Hatchery raised coho were out-competing wild stocks. The hatchery has since been required to carefully time releases of young fish in order to reduce the risk of competition.

The deaths of a dog in 2021 after going swimming occurred due to cyanobacteria in blue-green algae on the river, east of Willow Creek. Algae blooms can occur during times of warm weather and low water flow.

=== Restoration efforts ===
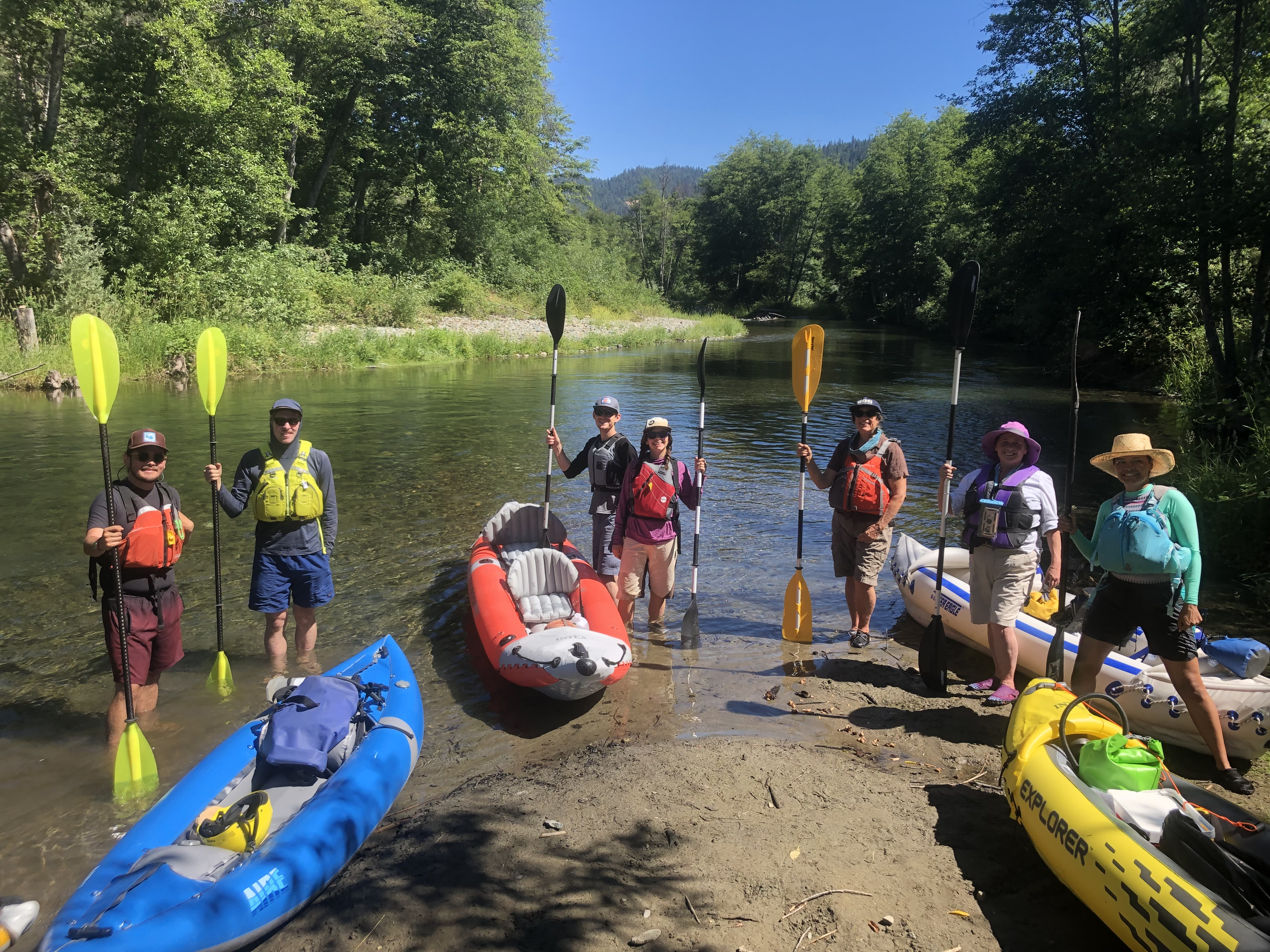
Volunteers with the Bureau of Land Management board kayaks to collect garbage from the river and its banks in 2022

After an environmental impact statement in 1991 the Bureau of Reclamation was required to make greater releases to the Trinity River below Lewiston Dam. On December 19, 2000, the Department of the Interior signed a Record of Decision (ROD) officially re-allocating Central Valley Project water for environmental purposes. This modified flow regime officially began in water year 2005. Prior to this, annual releases to the Trinity River ranged from 150 to 300 cubic feet per second (4.2 to 8.5 m^{3}/s), or about 109,000 to 217,000 acre-feet (134,000,000 to 268,000,000 m^{3}) each year, with the exception of occasional flood water discharges. The ROD increases the minimum dam release to 368,600 acre-feet (0.4547 km^{3}) or about 510 cubic feet per second (14 m^{3}/s), even in "critically dry" years, with even greater releases made during years of normal and above average precipitation. These restrictions would reduce the Trinity River diversions about 28 percent on average; however, the impacts on the Central Valley Project as a whole would be far less, only about 1–4 percent. In addition, the project will periodically release high flows up to 11,000 cubic feet per second (310 m^{3}/s) to simulate historic flooding and sediment transport conditions.

In 2015 Humboldt County won a lawsuit against the Westlands Water District for an extra 50,000 acre-feet (62,000,000 m^{3}) of water from the Trinity River for in-stream flows. Previously, the Bureau of Reclamation had included this sum in the water released for fishery management. Although this means more water for the Trinity River, no provision was made for commensurately reducing Central Valley Project water diversions, increasing the risk that Trinity Lake could be drained to "dead pool" in drought years.

Trinity River restoration flows
Water year type	Trinity River release	Trinity Release volume	Max. CVP diversion	Pct. flow released to river
Critically Dry	509 ft^{3}/s (14 m^{3}/s)	368,600 acre.ft (0.45 km^{3})	85,400 acre.ft (0.11 km^{3})	81%
Dry	625 ft^{3}/s (18 m^{3}/s)	452,600 acre.ft (0.56 km^{3})	358,400 acre.ft (0.44 km^{3})	56%
Normal	892 ft^{3}/s (25 m^{3}/s)	646,500 acre.ft (0.80 km^{3})	459,100 acre.ft (0.56 km^{3})	58%
Wet	968 ft^{3}/s (27 m^{3}/s)	701,000 acre.ft (0.86 km^{3})	900,000 acre.ft (1.11 km^{3})	44%
Extremely Wet	1,125 ft^{3}/s (32 m^{3}/s)	815,200 acre.ft (1.01 km^{3})	1,525,800 acre.ft (1.88 km^{3})	35%

Construction crews have also worked to rehabilitate the river channel below the dam by clearing out mining debris and excess brush. However, these activities have been criticized by some environmental groups as too heavy-handed. The California Water Impact Network stated channel rehabilitation was "an activity equivalent to a clear-cut on a Wild and Scenic River." Bulldozing of the riverbanks to clear space for juvenile salmon habitat has harmed steelhead spawning grounds, impacted public access and allowed the spread of invasive plant species. Between 2005 and 2011, restoration work cost a total of $36 million.

== Recreation ==
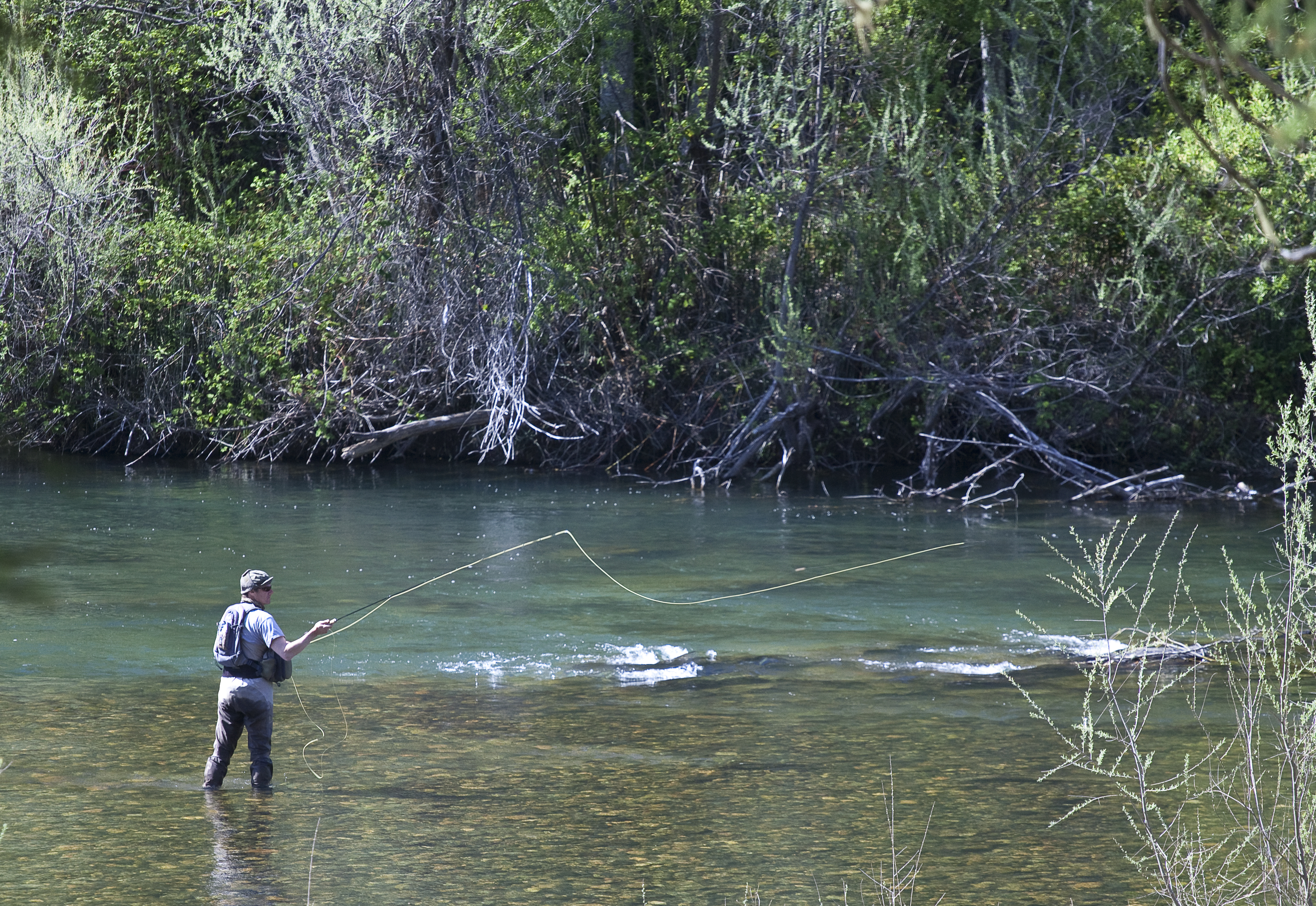
Fly fishing on the Trinity River

The Trinity River and many of its tributaries have been part of the National Wild and Scenic Rivers System since 1981. The main stem is designated from a point 100 yards (91 m) below Lewiston Dam to the confluence with the Klamath River. The North Fork and New River are designated from the boundary of the Trinity Alps Wilderness to the mouth, and the South Fork from State Route 36 to the mouth. A total of 44 miles (71 km) are classified as "wild", 39 miles (63 km) as "scenic" and 120 miles (190 km) as "recreational". The South Fork is the largest river in California without a single dam along its length. Although fish populations have declined since the early 1900s, fishing for salmon and steelhead has recovered on many parts of the river. The Trinity is known as one of the best steelhead streams in the western United States and is home to both wild and hatchery fish. The California Office of Environmental Health Hazard Assessment (OEHHA) has developed a safe eating advisory for fish caught in the Trinity River based on levels of mercury or PCBs found in local species.

The Trinity is a popular whitewater rafting and kayaking river. Dam releases for fish restoration have incidentally increased the amount of water available for boating year-round. The river has three main whitewater runs, all known for their scenery and wildlife. The Pigeon Point section, alongside Highway 299, contains Class II-III (beginner to intermediate) rapids. Below the takeout at Cedar Flat, the Trinity flows through the extremely hazardous Class V Burnt Ranch Gorge, which was first run in 1971 by three kayakers, one of whom died of a heart attack soon after finishing the run, due to the arduous work of portaging many rapids. This gave the area a bad reputation for many years; it was not until 1983 that commercial trips began on this section of the river. The lower Trinity, much of which flows through the Hoopa Valley Reservation, is a Class II river with gentler and lower gradient despite having a greater volume of water flow.

Recreational gold panning is another pastime along the Trinity. However, many streams in the area are located on private property, or are part of existing placer mining claims. Claims in the area are administered by the Bureau of Land Management (BLM). Because the Trinity River flows through a patchwork of private and public lands, the BLM and Forest Service maintain 14 designated locations for river access between Lewiston and Pigeon Point (just below Helena).

== See also ==
- List of rivers of California
