= Sally Noble =

Last speaker of the Chimariko language

Sally Noble was the last speaker of the Chimariko language. She worked with linguist and ethnologist J.P. Harrington to record what she remembered of the language.
