= Big Bar, Trinity County, California =

Unincorporated community in California, United States

Big Bar, California Hičʰeqʰut (Chimariko)
- Unincorporated community
- Location within California Location within the United States
- Coordinates: 40°44′28″N 123°15′21″W
- Country: United States
- State: California
- County: Trinity
- Elevation: 1,247 ft (380 m)
- Time zone: UTC-8 (Pacific (PST))
  - Summer (DST): UTC-7 (PDT)
- ZIP code: 96010
- Area code: 530
- GNIS feature ID: 1658047

Big Bar (Chimariko: Hičʰeqʰut) is an unincorporated community in Trinity County, California, United States. The ZIP Code is 96010. The community is served by area code 530. The area is surrounded by steep, mountainous terrain and dense forest. It sits along the Trinity River and is near the Trinity Alps

== History ==
Established in 1849, Big Bar was one of the first settled areas in the county. It has had a post office operating since 1850.

== Climate ==
Climate data for Big Bar, California, 1991–2020 normals, extremes 1989–present
Month	Jan	Feb	Mar	Apr	May	Jun	Jul	Aug	Sep	Oct	Nov	Dec	Year
Record high °F (°C)	74 (23)	82 (28)	89 (32)	97 (36)	106 (41)	113 (45)	121 (49)	118 (48)	117 (47)	102 (39)	86 (30)	66 (19)	121 (49)
Mean maximum °F (°C)	62.5 (16.9)	70.2 (21.2)	80.3 (26.8)	88.4 (31.3)	97.4 (36.3)	104.1 (40.1)	110.6 (43.7)	109.9 (43.3)	105.9 (41.1)	93.3 (34.1)	73.3 (22.9)	59.7 (15.4)	112.6 (44.8)
Mean daily maximum °F (°C)	49.6 (9.8)	55.5 (13.1)	62.3 (16.8)	68.9 (20.5)	78.4 (25.8)	86.4 (30.2)	96.5 (35.8)	95.4 (35.2)	89.0 (31.7)	74.3 (23.5)	56.8 (13.8)	47.7 (8.7)	71.7 (22.1)
Daily mean °F (°C)	42.0 (5.6)	45.2 (7.3)	49.5 (9.7)	53.9 (12.2)	61.1 (16.2)	67.3 (19.6)	74.8 (23.8)	73.8 (23.2)	68.1 (20.1)	57.5 (14.2)	47.2 (8.4)	40.9 (4.9)	56.8 (13.8)
Mean daily minimum °F (°C)	34.3 (1.3)	34.9 (1.6)	36.6 (2.6)	38.9 (3.8)	43.7 (6.5)	48.1 (8.9)	53.2 (11.8)	52.3 (11.3)	47.2 (8.4)	40.7 (4.8)	37.6 (3.1)	34.1 (1.2)	41.8 (5.4)
Mean minimum °F (°C)	26.3 (−3.2)	27.1 (−2.7)	29.3 (−1.5)	31.6 (−0.2)	36.5 (2.5)	41.7 (5.4)	48.8 (9.3)	48.5 (9.2)	42.1 (5.6)	34.2 (1.2)	28.6 (−1.9)	26.2 (−3.2)	22.8 (−5.1)
Record low °F (°C)	17 (−8)	17 (−8)	25 (−4)	27 (−3)	32 (0)	38 (3)	43 (6)	43 (6)	36 (2)	26 (−3)	20 (−7)	8 (−13)	8 (−13)
Average precipitation inches (mm)	6.41 (163)	5.37 (136)	4.58 (116)	2.62 (67)	1.67 (42)	0.73 (19)	0.17 (4.3)	0.20 (5.1)	0.44 (11)	2.20 (56)	4.19 (106)	7.24 (184)	35.82 (909.4)
Average snowfall inches (cm)	0.7 (1.8)	0.4 (1.0)	0.3 (0.76)	0.0 (0.0)	0.0 (0.0)	0.0 (0.0)	0.0 (0.0)	0.0 (0.0)	0.0 (0.0)	0.0 (0.0)	0.2 (0.51)	1.1 (2.8)	2.7 (6.87)
Average precipitation days (≥ 0.01 in)	15.8	13.7	14.3	10.5	7.1	3.5	1.2	0.9	1.9	5.1	12.6	14.7	101.3
Average snowy days (≥ 0.1 in)	0.7	0.4	0.4	0.0	0.0	0.0	0.0	0.0	0.0	0.0	0.2	0.5	2.2
Source 1: NOAA
Source 2: National Weather Service

== Government ==
In the state legislature, Big Bar is in the 4th Senate District, represented by Republican Doug LaMalfa, and in the 1st Assembly District, represented by Democrat Patty Berg.

Federally, Big Bar is in California's 2nd congressional district, represented by Democrat Jared Huffman.

== See also ==
- Trinity County, California
