= Denny, California =

Unincorporated community in California, United States

- Unincorporated community
- Location within California Location within the United States
- Coordinates: 40°56′38″N 123°23′12″W
- Country: United States
- State: California
- County: Trinity
- Elevation: 1,480 ft (450 m)
- Time zone: UTC-8 (Pacific (PST))
  - Summer (DST): UTC-7 (PDT)
- Area code: 530
- GNIS feature ID: 1655965

Denny refers to two small settlements named Denny in northwestern Trinity County, California, United States: one in the upper New River watershed within the Trinity Alps Wilderness Area and the other twenty miles downstream along a one-way county roadway. Terrain in the area is extremely steep and rugged.

== History (Old Denny) ==
The first Denny, now called Old Denny on maps, originated with two other little towns close to it—White Rock City and Marysville—in September 1884 when the area was populated with hard rock (lode) gold miners. Its name for the first few years was New River City and then was changed to Denny from A.H. Denny who maintained a store there as well as other stores over the ridges in Siskiyou County. (Denny never lived at the place that adopted his name, however.)

As time went on the gold profits went down, people were leaving to find other places to live, and, by 1920, brothers Grover and Willard Ladd began homesteading a 160-acre ranch where the new Denny would be located, twenty miles down the trail. In 1921, their parents, Frank and Nellie Ladd, left Old Denny and moved down with their sons, bringing with them the Denny Post Office, and so soon the new location adopted that name, as well. Old Denny was abandoned with no buildings standing now.

== History (New Denny) ==
This "new" Denny site, a large flat situated on a bench alongside the New River, was first occupied by placer gold miners in the mid-1850s soon after gold was discovered in the New River. General James W. Denver, after whom later the Colorado city was named, was one of the men instrumental in discovering this new source of gold, when he sent a group of men up in this direction, in 1851.

Cyrus Quimby and his brother-in-law, Robert L. Thomas, moved onto the large flat (also called "Big Flat" during its first years) in the mid-1850s, began farming and established a business called the Thomas-Quimby Trading Post (according to Trinity County official tax records for the late 1850s). Thomas and Quimby married Chimariko Indian sisters who had been raised along the Trinity River at Cedar Flat. The location became known as the town of Quimby, and the creek approximately one mile upstream from which the ranch obtained water, was also named after Cyrus Quimby. The town had a post office and was also a place for local voters to cast ballots at election time.

For a few years, circa 1907 the site was called Burris, after Frank Burris, who was the postmaster, ran the store, and mined part of the time at the Beartooth Mine, a gold and copper hard rock mine across the New River from Denny. The ranch was farmed and the store or trading post was continued by different people through the years until Grover and Willard Ladd took over the land with the intention of homesteading, as already mentioned above, in 1920.

=== 1970s-Current ===
Denny made occasional national news from the 1970s through the first years of the 1980s when there was in influx of new people who came to the area to live on mining claims. The mining claims are part of the National Forest system of public lands and the local U.S. Forest Service was responsible, in coordination with the Bureau of Land Management, for handling a situation where there were many illegal residences on the claims. The Mining Law of 1872 had allowed miners to live on their claims, but later legislation, including the Surface Rights Act of 1955, revised this, stipulating that a claim would have to actually support the claimants—not just be a place on which to live. It was a complicated situation which brought about controversial and sometimes angered incidents, including the burning of two Forest Service buildings by arson and, in April 1971 a Forest Service official was injured in the neck by a ricochet bullet during a mineral examination at one of the problem mining claims. Someone from the other side of the New River was shooting toward a group of people associated with the event.

A store was operated full time at Denny until the early 1970s, then intermittently for a few years, and then not at all. There is no store there now, although the little log structure still stands on the side of the road for passersby to view as they drive by. The road to Denny from Highway 299 West at Hawkins Bar is only about 19 miles but takes close to an hour to drive due to the number of curves and steep terrain.

Denny is the gateway to the western portion of the Trinity Alps Wilderness Area.
