= Salyer, California =

Unincorporated community in California, United States

- Unincorporated community Census-designated place
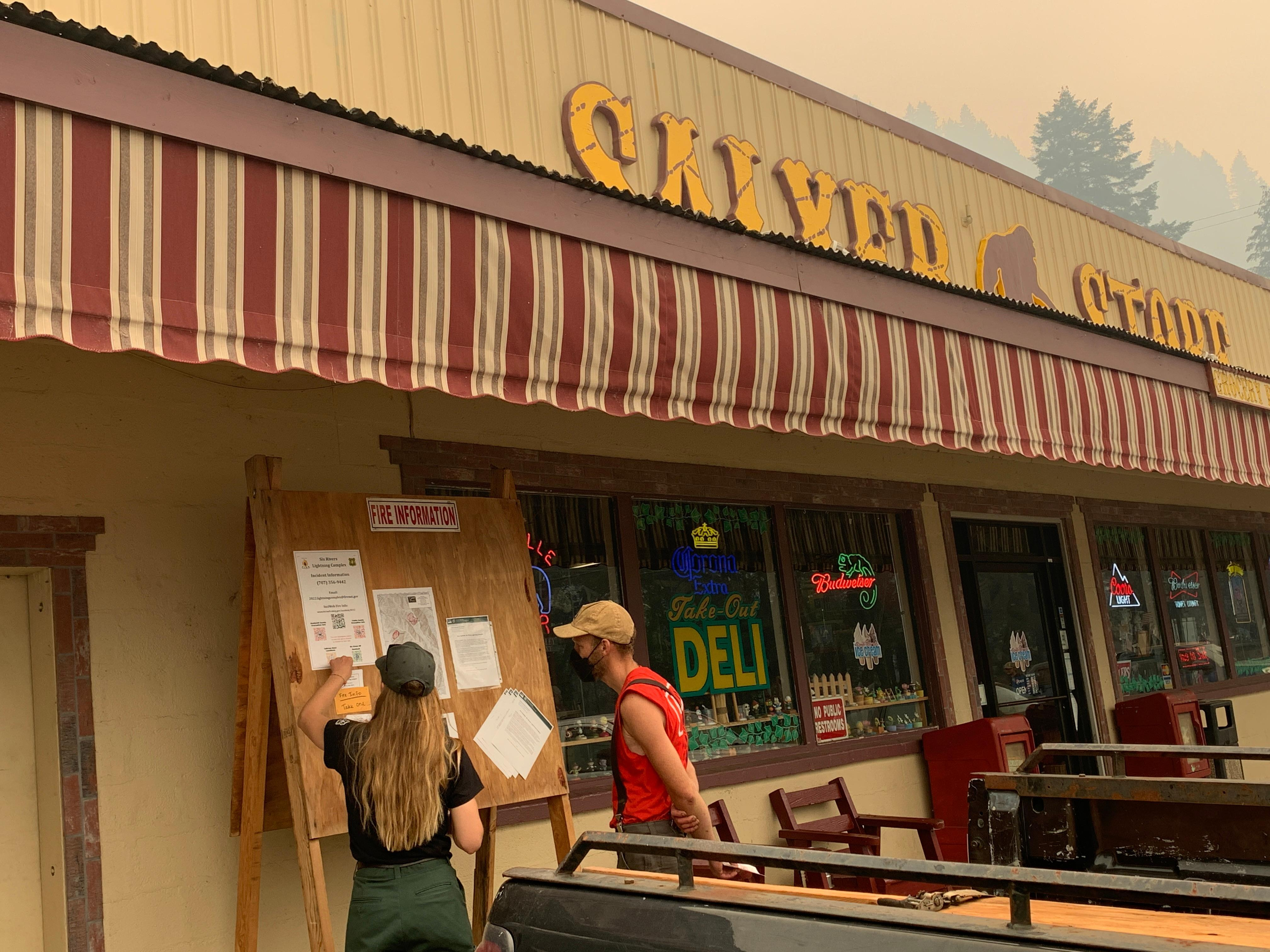
- Salyer Store in Salyer, California.

- Location within California
- Coordinates: 40°53′9.83″N 123°34′50.56″W
- Country: United States
- State: California
- County: Trinity

Area
  - Total: 5.319 sq mi (13.78 km^{2})
  - Land: 5.275 sq mi (13.66 km^{2})
  - Water: 0.044 sq mi (0.11 km^{2})
- Elevation: 1,391 ft (424 m)

Population (2020)
  - Total: 389
  - Density: 73.7/sq mi (28.5/km^{2})
- Time zone: UTC-8 (Pacific (PST))
  - Summer (DST): UTC-7 (PDT)
- ZIP code: 95563
- Area code: 530
- GNIS feature ID: 2804442

Salyer (Hupa: Miy-me’) is an unincorporated community and census-designated place (CDP) in Trinity County, California, United States. Salyer is located on State Highway 299, 52 miles (84 km) east of Eureka and 93 miles (150 km) west of Redding. Its population is 389 as of the 2020 census. For statistical purposes, the United States Census Bureau has defined Salyer as a census-designated place (CDP). The census definition of the area may not precisely correspond to local understanding of the area with the same name.

== History ==
Salyer was established on April 16, 1918, and named for Charles Marshall Salyer, a prominent miner. Salyer is located on lands previously inhabited by the Tsnungwe Tribe and is next to the Tsnungwe village of miy-me'. Prior to being named Salyer, a Tsnungwe Indian Dickson Dartt proposed the area be named after the village of miy-me.

== Government ==
In the California State Legislature, Salyer is in the 2nd senatorial district, represented by Democrat Mike McGuire, and in the 2nd Assembly district, represented by Democrat Chris Rogers.

In the United States House of Representatives, Salyer is in California's 2nd congressional district, represented by Democrat Jared Huffman.

== Climate ==
This region experiences warm (but not hot) and dry summers, with no average monthly temperatures above 71.6 °F. According to the Köppen Climate Classification system, Salyer has a hot-summer mediterranean climate, abbreviated "Csb" on climate maps.

Climate data for Salyer, California
Month	Jan	Feb	Mar	Apr	May	Jun	Jul	Aug	Sep	Oct	Nov	Dec	Year
Record high °F (°C)	75 (24)	78 (26)	82 (28)	91 (33)	100 (38)	106 (41)	112 (44)	110 (43)	108 (42)	98 (37)	88 (31)	75 (24)	112 (44)
Mean maximum °F (°C)	66 (19)	68 (20)	73 (23)	79 (26)	90 (32)	99 (37)	103 (39)	102 (39)	99 (37)	90 (32)	77 (25)	64 (18)	103 (39)
Mean daily maximum °F (°C)	50.6 (10.3)	56.7 (13.7)	61.0 (16.1)	68.0 (20.0)	74.5 (23.6)	84.2 (29.0)	96.0 (35.6)	95.4 (35.2)	88.2 (31.2)	73.7 (23.2)	57.8 (14.3)	49.3 (9.6)	71.3 (21.8)
Daily mean °F (°C)	42.6 (5.9)	46.3 (7.9)	49.5 (9.7)	54.1 (12.3)	59.4 (15.2)	67.2 (19.6)	74.8 (23.8)	74.1 (23.4)	68.3 (20.2)	58.8 (14.9)	47.1 (8.4)	42.4 (5.8)	57.0 (13.9)
Mean daily minimum °F (°C)	34.4 (1.3)	36.0 (2.2)	38.1 (3.4)	40.1 (4.5)	44.4 (6.9)	50.1 (10.1)	53.6 (12.0)	52.8 (11.6)	48.5 (9.2)	43.9 (6.6)	38.5 (3.6)	35.4 (1.9)	43.0 (6.1)
Mean minimum °F (°C)	25 (−4)	27 (−3)	29 (−2)	33 (1)	37 (3)	42 (6)	47 (8)	45 (7)	41 (5)	34 (1)	29 (−2)	26 (−3)	22 (−6)
Record low °F (°C)	10 (−12)	17 (−8)	23 (−5)	28 (−2)	31 (−1)	35 (2)	40 (4)	38 (3)	32 (0)	25 (−4)	17 (−8)	9 (−13)	9 (−13)
Average precipitation inches (mm)	8.78 (223)	6.78 (172)	4.93 (125)	3.23 (82)	1.80 (46)	0.79 (20)	0.16 (4.1)	0.10 (2.5)	0.60 (15)	2.77 (70)	5.79 (147)	9.04 (230)	44.77 (1,136.6)
Average snowfall inches (cm)	2.2 (5.6)	1.0 (2.5)	0.3 (0.76)	0.0 (0.0)	0.0 (0.0)	0.0 (0.0)	0.0 (0.0)	0.0 (0.0)	0.0 (0.0)	0.0 (0.0)	0.1 (0.25)	0.9 (2.3)	4.5 (11.41)
Source: NOAA

== Demographics ==
Historical population
Census	Pop.	Note	%±
2020	389		—
U.S. Decennial Census; 1850–1870 1880-1890; 1900 1910 1920; 1930 1940 1950; 1960 1970 1980; 1990 2000 2010; 2020

Salyer first appeared as a census designated place in the 2020 U.S. census.

=== 2020 Census ===
Salyer CDP, California – Racial and ethnic composition Note: the US Census treats Hispanic/Latino as an ethnic category. This table excludes Latinos from the racial categories and assigns them to a separate category. Hispanics/Latinos may be of any race.
Race / Ethnicity (NH = Non-Hispanic)	Pop 2020	% 2020
White alone (NH)	279	71.72%
Black or African American alone (NH)	1	0.26%
Native American or Alaska Native alone (NH)	45	11.57%
Asian alone (NH)	1	0.26%
Pacific Islander alone (NH)	0	0.00%
Other race alone (NH)	0	0.00%
Mixed race or Multiracial (NH)	39	10.03%
Hispanic or Latino (any race)	24	6.17%
Total	389	100.00%

== See also ==
- Trinity County, California
