= Beegum, California =

Unincorporated area in Shasta and Tehama Counties

Beegum
- Former town
- Location within California Location within the United States
- Coordinates: 40°20′42″N 122°51′29″W
- Country: United States
- State: California
- County: Tehama County
- Elevation: 1,302 ft (397 m)

Beegum, also known as Bee Gum, is a defunct town which was located in an unincorporated area of Tehama and Shasta counties, in the U.S. state of California. In the early 1900s, it was a mining town in the Harrison Gulch mining district.

Starting in 1913, proposals to make the road between Beegum and Peanut in Trinity County part of the state highway system were discussed repeatedly in the California state legislature. In 1933, the segment between Beegum and Peanut became part of the state highway connecting Eureka, California, to Reno, Nevada via Red Bluff.

By 1972, California State Route 36 was moved, bypassing Beegum and leading to the eventual abandonment of the hamlet, as well as the hunting and fishing resort which operated there.

== History ==
The community took its name from nearby Beegum Peak, which was said to resemble a bee gum hive and was also inhabited by bees. The town was situated next to Beegum Creek, which forms the county line between Tehama and Shasta counties.

During the California Gold Rush, prospectors flocked to Beegum Creek to look for placer gold, but there were no major discoveries in the Harrison Gulch district until the 1890s when the Midas Mine vein was found in 1894.

Beegum served as the first stagecoach stop between Red Bluff and the coast. From Beegum, stagecoaches proceeded to Peanut, Hayfork, and Eureka.

A post office was in operation at Beegum from 1895, and was ordered to close in January 1918. In 1902, miner Fred Smith was shot and killed by his partner George Wheeler near the Beegum post office, after Wheeler discovered that Smith was having an affair with his wife.

=== Selvester Ranch and businesses ===
The town was located on land that had been part of the Selvester Ranch, where the Selvester family lived for three generations. The Beegum area including the family ranch was popular with hunters.

Patriarch Isaac Selvester (1847–1930) purchased properties in Beegum after first settling in Maxwell, Colusa County, in 1887. In 1904, he and his sons Smith, George and Joseph formed the livestock company Selvester & Sons, raising cattle, horses and mules near Beegum. He put his ranch at Beegum up for sale in 1920.

Isaac Selvester also conducted a freight depot and roadhouse in Beegum, until freight teams were no longer used to haul payload from mines. The family business then shifted to cater to the automobile trade. In the late 1920s, his grandsons Jesse I. Selvester and Smith I. Selvester each operated businesses called "Beegum Garage", causing Smith to file a restraining order against his brother and W. D. Linton.

For a time, George W. Selvester operated a grocery store in Beegum. In 1955, Jesse I. Selvester was serving as foreman for the Beegum Mining Company, which had built a $200,000 chrome ore concentration plant in Beegum Gorge the year before.

=== School ===
The Beegum school operated for over half a century, until it was suspended in 1943 due to lack of pupils as well as a shortage of teachers. In the early years of the school, as many as 30 to 40 children lived in the community. One of the teachers was Maybelle B. Belote, who went on to marry Joseph Selvester in 1902.

In 1929, 12 pupils were enrolled at the Beegum school. In 1930, one of the three residents living closest to the schoolhouse agreed to give free rent to parents who built small dwellings near the school, so they could live there five days a week while their children attended school. For a period of 15 years or more before it closed, the school taught both elementary and high school students.

== Highway ==
In 1913, a bill was introduced in the lower house of the California state legislature, requesting an appropriation of $50,000 to build a 20-mile state highway connecting Beegum and Peanut in Trinity County. The Redding chamber of commerce opposed the measure, arguing that the route would be a disadvantage to the people of Shasta County. The bill was the first of many to be introduced repeatedly in the California legislature over the next twenty years.

After years of debate, in 1925, the California assembly passed bill No. 151 to place the road between Peanut and Beegum in the state highway system. By closing the gap between Peanut and Beegum, it was argued, motorists would have a nearly straight highway across the state connecting Eureka, California, to Reno, Nevada, via Red Bluff. Governor Friend Richardson subsequently vetoed the bill, leading The Sacramento Union to comment: "This veto is proper. If the people of Beegum and Peanut have not enough imagination to find new names for their hamlets, at least for legislative purposes, they are not entitled to new roads."

In 1930, the California State Automobile Association reported that between Red Bluff and Beegum, there was "good graveled and dirt road", but that after leaving Beegum toward Peanut, there was "a somewhat rough and rocky stretch". A 1931 report by the Eureka district office of the National Automobile Club was more critical, stating: "Between Peanut and Beegum, the road is in very poor condition. There are numerous streams to be forded on this stretch, there being no bridges, and during or immediately following storms this part of the road is impassable."

In March 1933, the California Department of Public Works announced that it would recommend to the California legislature inclusion of the Red Bluff–Eureka road into the state highway system. By August, the state highway department kicked off-road repairs, with one crew to be headquartered in Beegum, housed in five cabins constructed by George Selvester for their use. In June 1934, the Red Bluff Daily News reported that the Red Bluff–Eureka highway was in "excellent shape", including the segment from "Beegum and over Beegum mountain to Noble's Station and on to Wildwood and Peanut".

In 1966, the state allocated $250,000 for improvements of Forest Highway 6, the Peanut–Beegum Highway, and paving a segment of Highway 36.

In 1972, the Oakland Tribune noted that California State Route 36 had bypassed the hamlets of Beegum and Peanut over the course of making highway improvements. The decision to move the highway was devastating to the hunting and fishing resort then operating in Beegum.
