= Hayfork Creek =

River in California, United States

Hayfork Creek Hayfork River, Hayfork Branch, Hay Fork of the South Fork Trinity River
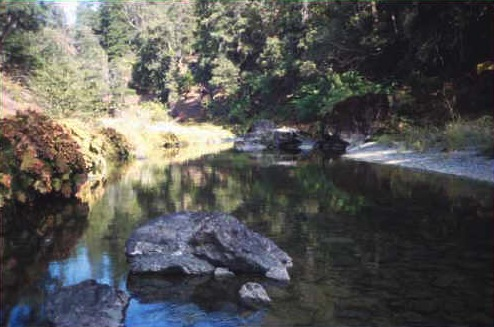

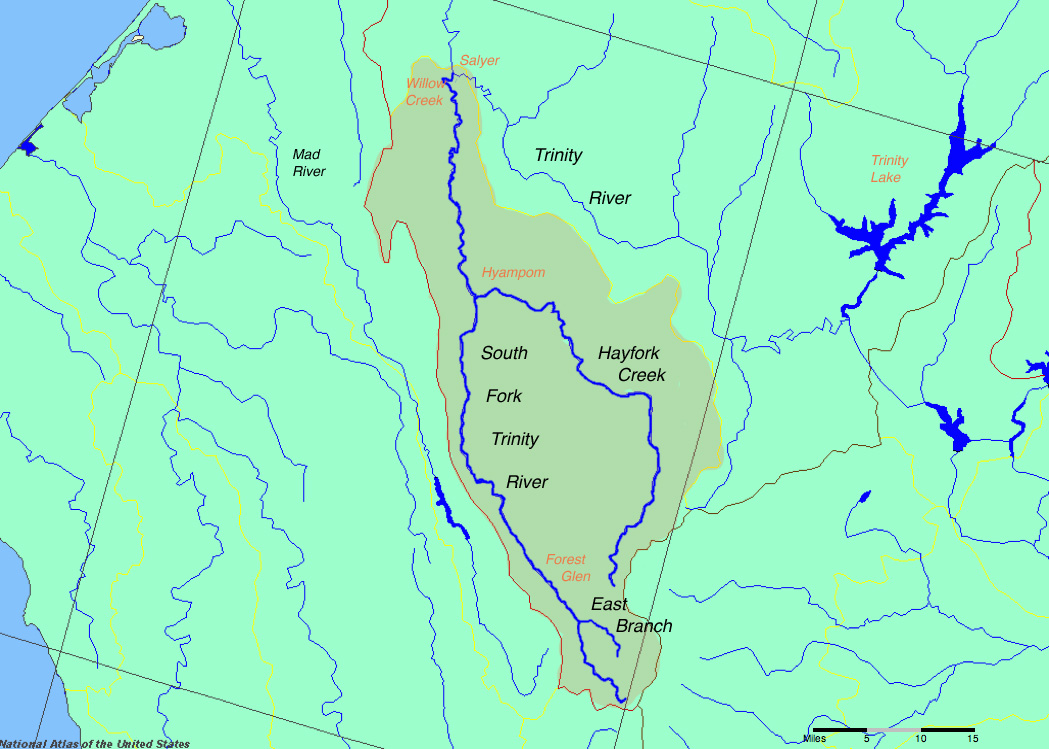
- Map of the South Fork Trinity River basin, showing Hayfork Creek to the right of the main stem.
- Etymology: Named for the hay fields of the richest agricultural region of Trinity County

Location
- Country: United States
- State: California
- Cities: Hayfork, Hyampom

Physical characteristics
- Source: Pine Root Saddle and Brushy Mountain (Trinity County, California)
  - location: Shasta-Trinity National Forest
  - coordinates: 40°17′36″N 123°04′22″W
  - elevation: 5,052 ft (1,540 m)
- Mouth: South Fork Trinity River
  - location: Hyampom
  - coordinates: 40°36′51″N 123°27′06″W
  - elevation: 1,276 ft (389 m)
- Length: 50 mi (80 km), north then west
- Basin size: 379 sq mi (980 km^{2})
- Discharge
  - average: 552 cu ft/s (15.6 m^{3}/s)
  - minimum: 19 cu ft/s (0.54 m^{3}/s)
  - maximum: 29,400 cu ft/s (830 m^{3}/s)

Basin features
- Tributaries
  - left: Salt Creek, Tule Creek, Miners Creek, Corral Creek, Grassy Flats Creek, Big Creek, Bear Creek, Garden Gulch, Digger Gulch, Barker Creek, Big Canyon, Summit Creek, Drinkwater Gulch, Kingsbury Gulch, Kellogg Gulch, Carter Gulch, Bean Gulch, Cedar Gulch, Little Creek, Bar Gulch, Ewing Gulch, Morgan Gulch, Coon Creek, Coonrod Gulch, McCovey Gulch, Dinner Gulch, Pasture Gulch, Walker Creek, Jud Creek, Rusch Creek, James Creek, East Fork Hayfork Creek, Carrier Gulch, Saddle Gulch, China Gulch, Negro Gulch, Dubakella Creek, Grapevine Gulch, Limestone Gulch, Duncan Creek

Hayfork Creek is a tributary of the South Fork Trinity River in Northern California in the United States. At over 50 miles (80 km) long, it is the river's longest tributary and is one of the southernmost streams in the Klamath Basin. It winds through a generally steep and narrow course north, then west through the forested Klamath Mountains, but also passes through the Hayfork and Hyampom Valleys, which are the primary agricultural regions of Trinity County.

Human habitation in the basin goes back more than 5,000 years. The watershed of the creek was originally inhabited by the Wintu people. The first Euro-Americans arrived in the late 1820s, but the basin was not developed until the 1850s with the onset of the California Gold Rush. The fertile soils and mild climate of the river valley led to it becoming the most prosperous agricultural area of the county. Logging began in the 1920s, and by the 1940s started to have an adverse impact on the ecology of the watershed, which includes once-abundant populations of Chinook salmon, steelhead and Coho Salmon.

== Course ==
The Hayfork begins as two large springs, one rises on the west flank of Pine Root Saddle and the other on nearby Brushy Mountain some 7 miles (11 km) south of the hamlet of Wildwood. Flowing generally north through a deep forested valley in the Shasta-Trinity National Forest, it receives the East Fork from the right. Five miles (8 km) downstream, it enters the Hayfork Valley, a large agricultural basin in the middle of the Klamath Mountains. Here it receives Summit Creek. The stream also passes State Route 3 and the small town of Hayfork.

Winding northwest out of the valley, the creek enters a steep gorge, plunging over whitewater rapids and around giant boulders between narrow cliffs. At the Miners Creek confluence from the right, Hayfork Creek turns west and shortly afterwards receives Corral Creek, also from the right. Approximately a mile (1.6 km) above the mouth, the river spills out of the mountains into the town of Hyampom in the Hyampom Valley. It joins the South Fork of the Trinity just south of Hyampom, 30 miles (48 km) above the larger river's mouth on the Trinity River.

=== Discharge ===
The U.S. Geological Survey had a stream gauge on Hayfork Creek at Hyampom from 1954 to 1974. During the twenty years of record, the average discharge at the mouth was 552 cubic feet per second (15.6 m^{3}/s) calculated from monthly mean discharges. The largest peak flow was 29,400 cubic feet per second (830 m^{3}/s) in December 1964. The lowest monthly average was 19.1 cubic feet per second (0.54 m^{3}/s) in September 1960. There was also a gauge at Hayfork from 1956 to 1976. The mean annual discharge for this location was 119 cubic feet per second (3.4 m^{3}/s) (1956–1965, as there was no data recorded for monthly flows after 1965). The maximum peak flow was during the storms of December 1964 at 7,520 cubic feet per second (213 m^{3}/s). The minimum monthly average was 3 cubic feet per second (0.085 m^{3}/s) in August 1959.

== Watershed ==
Hayfork Creek drains a mountainous, remote watershed of 379 square miles (980 km^{2}) situated entirely within southern Trinity County. Although the majority of the basin is covered by the Klamath Mountains, it also contains some of Trinity County's only significant amounts of arable land in the Hayfork and Hyampom Valleys. Elevations in the watershed range from 6,400 feet (2,000 m) at Chanchelulla Peak, the basin's highest point, to 1,276 feet (389 m) at the river's mouth. About 78.6% of the watershed or 298 square miles (770 km^{2}) lies within public lands, mostly owned by the U.S. Forest Service. The remaining 21.4% is private land, mainly used for cattle ranching and farming.

The Hayfork Creek watershed divide separates it from several other river valleys. The entire western boundary lies along the divide with the South Fork Trinity River. To the northwest lies the valley of the main stem of the Trinity River. In the east, a long ridge separates the Hayfork basin from the Sacramento Valley, specifically the headwaters of a stream, Cottonwood Creek, which drains to the Sacramento River. The mountains generally decrease in height from east to west, from over 6,000 feet (1,800 m) along the eastern ridges to 4,500 feet (1,400 m) on the mountains above the South Fork Trinity River. The headwaters of the creek itself lie at an elevation of over 5,000 feet (1,500 m). The Hayfork Valley lies at an elevation of 2,418 feet (737 m).

The geography of the watershed is widely varied, from subalpine in the Chanchellula Wilderness and on Hayfork Bally down to hot, dry scrub and chaparral in the lower river valley. The dominant vegetation type is mixed conifer-hardwood forest, with common species including douglas-fir, ponderosa, Sugar, and Digger pine, California black oak, canyon live oak, common and hairy manzanita, and White oak, as well as many riparian species including bigleaf maple, Pacific dogwood, white alder, and black cottonwood. Hayfork Valley consists mainly of oak and digger pine woodlands and grasslands, although much of this has been altered to accommodate housing and agriculture. In the valley, the creek suffers from high water temperatures and contamination due to marijuana farming along the stream's banks and water diversions from tributaries. In some places the creek went subsurface in 2014 at the height of the drought. There are many small diversions from the tributaries, both legal and illegal. The biggest diversion is from Big Creek north of Hayfork, which diverts water for Big Creek Ranch and Ewing Reservoir, Hayfork's water supply. The water district is authorized to divert water from December 1 until June 1 of each winter, and they slowly deplete the reservoir all summer.

The only significant town along the creek is Hayfork, with a population of about 2,368. Hyampom, with 241, is the only other Census Designated Place, although only about 1/4 of Hyampom's population lives in the Hayfork Creek watershed. Other settlements in the watershed are Peanut, population 73, and Wildwood, with 64. Hayfork is the second largest town in Trinity County after Weaverville, the county seat, and is central to the Hayfork Valley, the primary agricultural region in Trinity County. Other towns within the basin include Peanut, which is located on Salt Creek, and Wildwood, situated near the headwaters of the Hayfork. The total human population of the watershed is approximately 2,750-3,000 which amounts to 7.3-7.9 people per square mile. If you subtract the 2368 people who live in Hayfork, it becomes 1-1.7 people per square mile.

== Geology ==
The stream flows through an area of the Klamath Mountains created by uplift caused by the collision of multiple exotic terranes (in this case, a fragment of uplifted crust formed by tectonic activity on the Pacific Plate) with the North American Plate. The resulting buckling stress caused the formation of the mountain ranges of northwestern California in stages. Hayfork Creek runs across the western part of the Hayfork Terrane, which was formed about 165 million years ago by plutonic activity beneath the Pacific Plate, and collided with the North American Plate sometime between 140 and 120 million years ago. By the mid-Paleocene, approximately 59 million years ago, the Klamath Mountains first rose; erosion and orogeny occurred over time continuing to this day, with the last great mountain-building period in the Pleistocene, about 1.6 million years ago. It is believed that the present course of the stream had been established prior to the formation of the mountains – as they rose, the creek's erosional force cut canyons and valleys into the bedrock, maintaining its course.

The Hayfork Valley is an alluvial basin filled with sediments at least 300 feet (91 m) deep deposited by Hayfork, Carr, Barker, Big, Salt and other streams from the surrounding water. Approximately 30 feet (9.1 m) of the alluvium dates from the Holocene less than 12,000 years ago. The valley is underlain by the Hayfork Valley Groundwater Basin which ranges from 10 to 35 feet (3.0 to 10.7 m) below the surface.

== History ==
The Wintu Native American tribe (specifically the Nor-El-Muk or Hayfork Wintu, one of six major divisions of the tribe) lived along Hayfork Creek. The range of the Wintu extended roughly through the highlands and mountains of the upper Hayfork Creek basin bordering on the Hayfork Valley, although archaeological sites containing spearheads and arrowheads have been discovered as far downstream as Hyampom. The Wintu established permanent winter camps on streams, and during the spring and summer traveled to farther and higher-elevation areas to hunt. The staple food of the Native Americans was salmon, which thrived in abundance in the rivers of the region. Other important foods included, acorn various types of berries or small game.

The first outsider to see Hayfork Creek was fur trapper Jedediah Smith in the dawn of 1828, who was leading an expedition from northern California into Oregon. Their route took them up Hayfork Creek, the South Fork Trinity River, and the Trinity and Klamath Rivers before they arrived on the far north Pacific coast of California. However, the party did not stay in the area for long. The route along lower Hayfork Creek that Smith and his men had taken later became a trade path between the Central Valley and coastal Oregon.

Following the California Gold Rush, in which gold was discovered along the Trinity River in 1848, Americans began to settle the Hayfork Valley and because of its abundant water, mild climate and fertile soils it quickly became the most productive agricultural area or the "breadbasket" of Trinity County. Miners worked claims along the upper section of the creek and along some of its headwaters tributaries. In 1851, the town of Hayfork was first established, and was originally named Kingsbury. The town boomed because of the valley's rapidly improving economy, reaching a population of 1,200 by 1860. The Hyampom Valley, while smaller than the Hayfork Valley, has similar qualities and the first permanent European settlements were built in the 1860s.

In 1852, a settler from Weaverville, a town situated about 15 miles (24 km) northeast of the Hayfork Valley, was reportedly killed by Native Americans and his herd of cattle stolen. After his body was found, a searching party tracked the natives to their camp on the confluence of Bridge Gulch and Hayfork Creek, the former of which is spanned by a natural bridge made infamous from the impending events. About 70 whites set out from Weaverville within a week of the murder, and killed 153 of the 158 Native Americans in what became known as the Bridge Gulch Massacre.

== Ecology ==
Historically Hayfork Creek was one of the more productive steelhead and salmon streams of the Trinity River basin. Agricultural runoff since the late 1800s has hurt the ecosystem of the creek downstream of Hayfork, which is the largest farming region of the watershed. Former mining and logging operations have caused sediment to cloud up streams but the main issue is legal and illegal marijuana grows that have caused increased amounts of chemicals to wash into the stream, clouding the water and endangering fish populations. The upper section of the creek was formerly polluted from acid mine drainage, most notably from the Kelly Mine on McCovey Gulch, which is no longer contaminated . The temperature of the creek near the mouth has risen above 85 °F (29 °C) in dry summers, posing fatal conditions to fish. Records show a high mortality rate of female salmon and recurring fish kills, probably caused by the high temperatures and the clouding of water by contaminants and sediments that wash down from agricultural and built-up areas.

One of the biggest problems for the stream is drought and contamination from marijuana farms. In the past logging, mining, and agriculture caused the majority of pollution. There are several species of endangered or threatened animals that live within the watershed, including the Northern spotted owl and peregrine falcon. The Hayfork Creek valley also provides a major component of the flight path of migratory birds travelling between the Pacific coast and the Sacramento Valley.

== Tourism and recreation ==
The creek is known throughout Trinity County for its recreational gold mining. Reputedly some of the best spots for mining in Northern California lie along the Hayfork upstream of the Hayfork Valley and below Wildwood. The geology of the stream bed is described as a "natural gold trap" and recent strikes have been made there of up to 60 ounces in one day.

For experienced kayakers and rafters, the upper and lower thirds of Hayfork Creek are filled with rapids ranging from Class III to V. Especially in the lower portion of the creek, large boulders and waterfalls require strenuous portages; and high flow fluctuations (the river has no dams and only a few diversions) cause the stream to range between 50 cubic feet per second (1.4 m^{3}/s) and 10,000 cubic feet per second (280 m^{3}/s) in any given year. Boating is safest at flows of 400 to 2,000 cubic feet per second (11 to 57 m^{3}/s).

== See also ==
- List of rivers of California

== Works cited ==
- Gudde, Erwin G.; Bright, William (2004). California Place Names: The Origin and Etymology of Current Geographical Names. University of California Press. ISBN 0-520-24217-3. Accessed 2010-12-11.
- Hoover, Mildred Brooke; Rensch, Hero Eugene; Rensch, Ethel Grace. Abeloe, William N. (ed.). Historic Spots in California (3rd ed.). Stanford University Press. ISBN 0-8047-4020-8.
