= Douglas City, California =

Douglas City
- unincorporated community census-designated place
- Location of Douglas City in Trinity County, California.

- Position in California
- Coordinates: 40°38′42″N 122°55′39″W
- Country: United States
- State: California
- County: Trinity

Area
  - Total: 30.44 sq mi (78.83 km^{2})
  - Land: 30.42 sq mi (78.80 km^{2})
  - Water: 0.012 sq mi (0.03 km^{2}) 0.04%
- Elevation: 2,152 ft (656 m)

Population (2020)
  - Total: 868
  - Density: 28.5/sq mi (11.02/km^{2})
- Time zone: UTC-8 (Pacific (PST))
  - Summer (DST): UTC-7 (PDT)
- ZIP Code: 96024
- Area code: 530
- GNIS feature ID: 2582999

Douglas City is an unincorporated community in Trinity County, California, United States. First settled during the California Gold Rush, Douglas City sits at an elevation of 2,152 feet (656 m). The ZIP Code is 96024. The community is inside area code 530. Its population is 868 as of the 2020 census, up from 713 from the 2010 census. For statistical purposes, the United States Census Bureau has defined Douglas City as a census-designated place (CDP). The Whiskeytown–Shasta–Trinity National Recreation Area is nearby.

== Namesake ==
It was named after Stephen Douglas of Illinois, who became well known after the Lincoln–Douglas debates of 1858.

== History ==
The prehistoric residents of the area were Wintun people; from North Fork to Douglas City the group was called Tien-Tien which means "friends". The Karuk called the same people the Kashahara. Local people suffered loss of population beginning with the epidemic of 1842. The explorer Jedediah Smith and his party came through the Hayfork area in 1828, killing several local people to intimidate the others and permit their passage. The Tien-Tien population was further reduced during the gold rush along the Trinity River.

In 1848, Pierson B. Reading found gold along the Trinity; the bar he worked is at Reading's Creek just south of the Douglas City bridge. Reading took out over $80,000 of gold on his first trip. Douglas Bar was active before 1856. Settlers arrived quickly, workings began on other bars in the area and towns formed at places along the trails for housing and supply. In just two years, every bar along the Trinity and its tributary streams was being worked and agriculture had started in some of the valleys.

Douglas City was settled by Europeans and Americans around 1850 as a mining and supply town.

The Natural Bridge (associated more with Hayfork than Douglas City) was the site of the Bridge Gulch Massacre in March 1852. Trinity Sheriff William H. Dixon and a number of men set out to catch the individuals (thought to be Wintu Indians) who killed a well-liked local butcher by the name of J. R. Anderson. The posse never found the assailants of Anderson, but after two days of tracking, did find another (and much larger camp) of Wintu Indians at the natural bridge. They attacked in the early morning hours and killed nearly every man, woman, and child. Accounts vary, but the numbers usually trend toward 150 killed with one to three children surviving.

The streams and hillsides of the area suffered during the Great Flood of 1862. Gold panning and hydraulic mining continued. By 1864, the river bars around Douglas City had produced over $1,000,000 of gold, an enormous sum in 1864 dollars. The first Post Office in Douglas City started in 1867.

Reconstruction of the flag carried by the Douglas City Rifles, pre description

Until 1857 all transport to and from Douglas City was by foot, mule or horse. When a private road was built through the area, four-horse stagecoaches ran from Weaverville through Douglas City to Redding Creek, Brown's Creek and Hayfork Valley. In 1863 locals formed the Douglas City Rifles to combat the Wintun; none of their raids caused bloodshed. In 1859, Theodore Eldon Jones (later the first Trinity County Superior Court Judge) started the short-lived Douglas City Gazette newspaper. Renamed Trinity Gazette, it stopped publishing in 1861 as people left the area for the American Civil War and new gold diggings in Idaho.

The Douglas City Library was founded on September 27, 1916 by Maude Marshall who maintained it in her home for both the public and students at the Douglas City school district.

== Geography ==
Nearby towns and cities include Big Bar, French Gulch, Igo, Junction City, Lewiston, Redding, Weaverville, and Whiskeytown.

According to the United States Census Bureau, the CDP covers an area of 30.4 square miles (79 km^{2}), 99.96% of it land and 0.04% of it water.

Pleistocene deposits near Douglas City have mammoth, ground sloth and deer fossil bones.

=== Climate ===
This region experiences warm (but not hot) and dry summers, with no average monthly temperatures above 71.6 °F. According to the Köppen Climate Classification system, Douglas City has a warm-summer Mediterranean climate, abbreviated "Csb" on climate maps.

== Demographics ==
Historical population
Census	Pop.	Note	%±
1860	120		—
1870	411		242.5%
2010	713		—
2020	868		21.7%
U.S. Decennial Census; 1850–1870 1880-1890; 1900 1910 1920; 1930 1940 1950; 1960 1970 1980; 1990 2000 2010

The 2020 United States census reported that Douglas City had a population of 868. The population density was 28.5 inhabitants per square mile (11.0/km^{2}). The racial makeup of Douglas City was 677 (78.0%) White, 3 (0.3%) African American, 18 (2.1%) Native American, 33 (3.8%) Asian, 2 (0.2%) Pacific Islander, 22 (2.5%) from other races, and 113 (13.0%) from two or more races. Hispanic or Latino of any race were 53 persons (6.1%).

The census reported that 99.0% of the population lived in households, 1.0% lived in non-institutionalized group quarters, and no one was institutionalized.

There were 401 households, out of which 79 (19.7%) had children under the age of 18 living in them, 167 (41.6%) were married-couple households, 28 (7.0%) were cohabiting couple households, 86 (21.4%) had a female householder with no partner present, and 120 (29.9%) had a male householder with no partner present. 147 households (36.7%) were one person, and 90 (22.4%) were one person aged 65 or older. The average household size was 2.14. There were 223 families (55.6% of all households).

The age distribution was 153 people (17.6%) under the age of 18, 27 people (3.1%) aged 18 to 24, 174 people (20.0%) aged 25 to 44, 279 people (32.1%) aged 45 to 64, and 235 people (27.1%) who were 65 years of age or older. The median age was 51.9 years. For every 100 females, there were 124.3 males.

There were 511 housing units at an average density of 16.8 units per square mile (6.5 units/km^{2}), of which 401 (78.5%) were occupied. Of these, 321 (80.0%) were owner-occupied, and 80 (20.0%) were occupied by renters.

== Education ==
In 1994, the Douglas City Elementary School had 141 pupils. In 2010, the enrollment for the K-8 school was 114; spending was about $12,000 per student.

== Infrastructure ==
California State Route 299 and California State Route 3 junction across the Trinity River from Douglas City and continue co-joined through the town on the way to Weaverville. Steiner Flat Road continues from Douglas City downstream along the Trinity.

== Government ==
In the state legislature, Douglas City is in the 2nd senatorial district, represented by Democrat Mike McGuire, and the 2nd Assembly district, represented by Democrat Chris Rogers.

Federally, Douglas City is in California's 2nd congressional district, represented by Democrat Jared Huffman.

== See also ==
- Trinity County, California
