= California State Route 3 =

State highway in California, United States

State Route 3
- SR 3 highlighted in red

Route information
- Maintained by Caltrans
- Length: 146.369 mi (235.558 km) SR 3 is broken into pieces, and the length does not reflect the SR 299 overlap that would be required to make the route continuous.
- Existed: 1964 renumbering–present
- Tourist routes: Trinity Heritage Scenic Byway

Major junctions
- South end: SR 36 near Peanut
- SR 299 from near Douglas City to Weaverville; SR 263 in Yreka; I-5 in Yreka; CR A28 in Montague
- North end: Ball Mountain Little Shasta Road in Montague

Location
- Country: United States
- State: California
- Counties: Trinity, Siskiyou

Highway system
- State highways in California; Interstate; US; State; Scenic; History; Pre‑1964; Unconstructed; Deleted; Freeways
← SR 2	→ SR 4

State Route 3 (SR 3) is a state highway in the U.S. state of California that serves Trinity and Siskiyou counties. It runs from SR 36 north along the shore of Trinity Lake, Fort Jones and Etna. The route then approaches Yreka, intersecting with Interstate 5 (I-5), and turns east to Montague. The road was numbered SR 3 in 1964, and most of it has been part of the state highway system since 1933.

== Route description ==
Route 3 is defined in section 303 of the California Streets and Highways Code. The definition omits the concurrency with Route 299 instead of duplicating that segment in the other route's definition in the code:

Route 3 is from:
(a) Route 36 near Peanut to Route 299 near Douglas City.
(b) Route 299 near Weaverville to Montague via Main Street in Yreka.

SR 3 begins at the junction with SR 36 south of the town of Peanut in Trinity County. SR 3 is also known as Bramlot Road from its southern terminus to Hayfork. This stretch of road through the Shasta-Trinity National Forest parallels the Hayfork River. Once SR 3 reaches the town of Hayfork, it travels along Hyampom Road east and snakes through the mountains to Douglas City and the junction with SR 299. From there, SR 3 runs concurrently with SR 299 north to the town of Weaverville. SR 3 then separates from SR 299, providing access to the Whiskeytown-Shasta-Trinity National Recreation Area and Trinity Dam along Lewiston Lake.

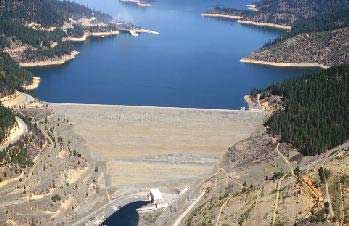
Trinity Dam in Trinity Lake north of Lewiston

SR 3 passes through the towns of Covington Mill, Trinity Center, and Coffee Creek before paralleling the Trinity River and Trinity Mountains as Weaverville-Scott Mountain Road and crossing the Scott Mountains and the Pacific Crest Trail into Siskiyou County.

In Siskiyou County, SR 3 passes through Callahan, Etna, Greenview, and Fort Jones as it turns northeast to intersect with Interstate 5 in Yreka. At this point, SR 263 continues in the northerly direction towards SR 96; SR 3 turns east to its northern terminus in the incorporated city of Montague.

SR 3 is part of the California Freeway and Expressway System, and a portion near the northern terminus is part of the National Highway System, a network of highways that are considered essential to the country's economy, defense, and mobility by the Federal Highway Administration. SR 3 is eligible to be included in the State Scenic Highway System, and is officially designated as a scenic highway by the California Department of Transportation for its entire length, meaning that it is a substantial section of highway passing through a "memorable landscape" with no "visual intrusions", where the potential designation has gained popular favor with the community.

The segment of SR 3 from Weaverville to Gazelle Callahan Road forms part of the Trinity Heritage Scenic Byway, a National Forest Scenic Byway.

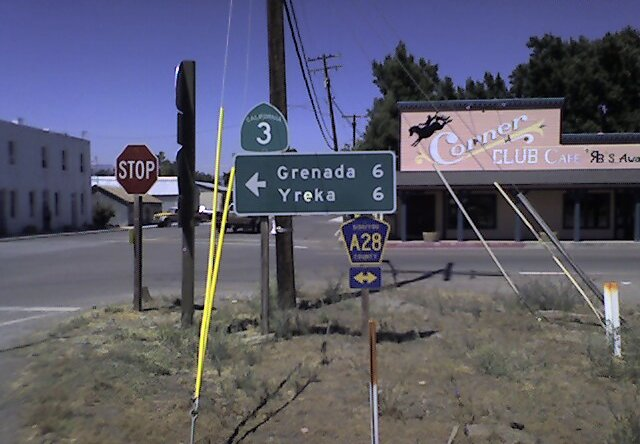
Junction of SR 3 and CR A28 in Montague

In 2014, SR 3 had an annual average daily traffic (AADT) of 135 at U.S. Forest Service Road, and 10,000 at Moonlit Oaks Avenue, the latter of which was the highest AADT for the highway.

== History ==
The former version of SR 3 briefly existed in the Los Angeles area in 1934, running between San Juan Capistrano and Oxnard before it became US 101 Alt., and later a part of SR–1

The short piece from SR 36 north to Peanut was added to the state highway system in 1907 as part of the Peanut Road, which became Route 35 in 1917. Route 35 was extended north from Peanut to Route 20 (SR 299) near Douglas City in 1933, and simultaneously a new Route 82 was created, running from Route 3 (I-5) in the Yreka area southwest to Etna and east to Montague. The gap between Douglas City and Etna was filled in 1959 with an extension of Route 82 south to Route 20 near Weaverville; at the same time, the portion between Weaverville and Yreka was added to the California Freeway and Expressway System, which identifies the main routes of transportation in the state of California. The State Route 3 designation was applied to the Peanut-Montague roadway in the 1964 renumbering. The overlap with temporary I-5 (along the portion where SR 3 runs concurrently with Interstate 5 today) near Yreka was removed when the new I-5 bypass was built; the legislative definition was updated to reflect this in 1974, soon after the building of the bypass.

== Major intersections ==
Except where prefixed with a letter, postmiles were measured on the road as it was in 1964, based on the alignment that existed at the time, and do not necessarily reflect current mileage. Postmile prefixes include: R reflecting a realignment in the route since then, M indicating a second realignment, L referring to an overlap due to a correction or change, and T indicating postmiles classified as temporary. Segments that remain unconstructed or have been relinquished to local control may be omitted. The numbers reset at county lines; the start and end postmiles in each county are given in the county column.

County	Location	Postmile	Destinations	Notes
Trinity; TRI L0.00-85.07		L0.00	SR 36 – Red Bluff, Forest Glen	South end of SR 3
Trinity; TRI L0.00-85.07	Hayfork		Hyampom Road – Hyampom	
Trinity; TRI L0.00-85.07		L30.89 R58.11 (Note: Indicates that the postmile represents the distance along SR 299 rather than SR 3.)	SR 299 east – Redding	South end of SR 299 overlap
Trinity; TRI L0.00-85.07		56.80	Moon Lim Lee Rest Area	
Trinity; TRI L0.00-85.07	Weaverville	51.57 30.86	SR 299 west (Main Street) – Eureka	North end of SR 299 overlap
Siskiyou; SIS 0.41-54.19		6.95	Gazelle Callahan Road – Gazelle	
Siskiyou; SIS 0.41-54.19	Fort Jones	32.20	Scott River Road – Scott Bar	
Siskiyou; SIS 0.41-54.19	Yreka	L47.26	Moonlit Oaks Avenue (I-5 Bus. south) to I-5 – Redding, Portland	South end of I-5 Bus. overlap
Siskiyou; SIS 0.41-54.19	Yreka	L49.21	Center Street to I-5	
Siskiyou; SIS 0.41-54.19	Yreka	L49.87	SR 263 north (North Main Street) / Tebbe Street	
Siskiyou; SIS 0.41-54.19	Yreka	R47.38	I-5 – Portland, Redding	I-5 exit 776; north end of I-5 Bus. overlap
Siskiyou; SIS 0.41-54.19	Montague	53.22	CR A28 south (Montague Grenada Road) – Grenada	South end of CR A28 overlap
Siskiyou; SIS 0.41-54.19	Montague		CR A28 north (11th Street)	North end of CR A28 overlap
Siskiyou; SIS 0.41-54.19	Montague	54.19	Ball Mountain Little Shasta Road – Ball Mountain	Continuation beyond the Montague east city limit; north end of SR 3
1.000 mi = 1.609 km; 1.000 km = 0.621 mi: Concurrency terminus
