= Cottonwood Creek (Sacramento River tributary) =

River in Shasta County, United States

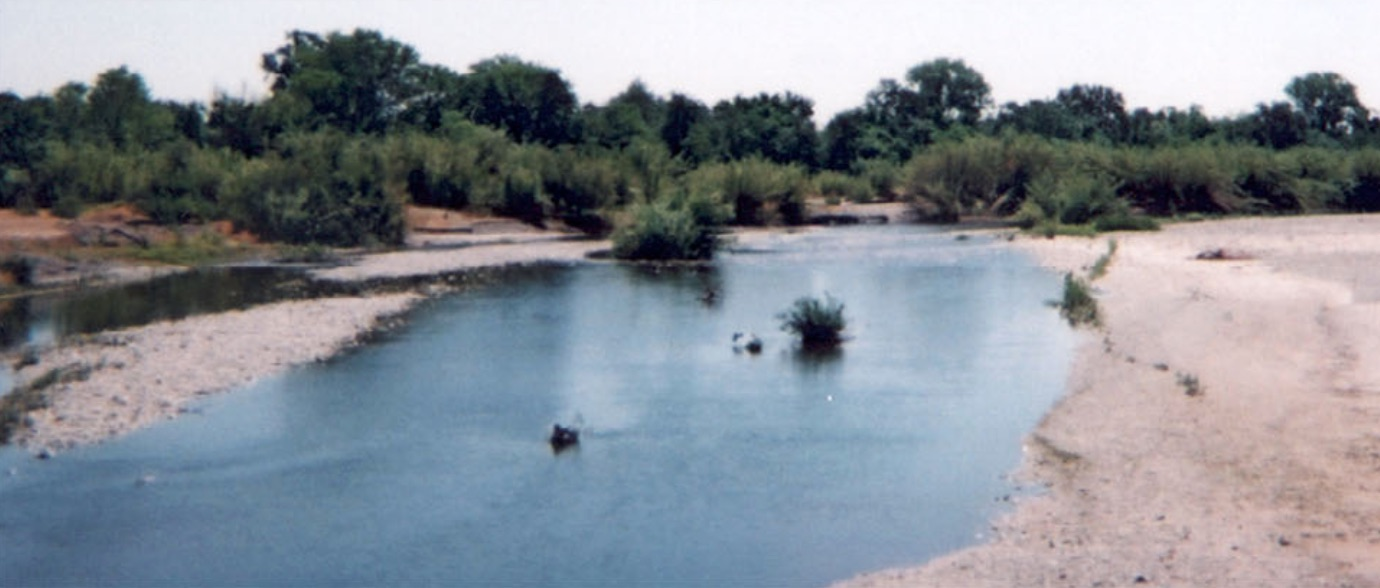
- Cottonwood Creek

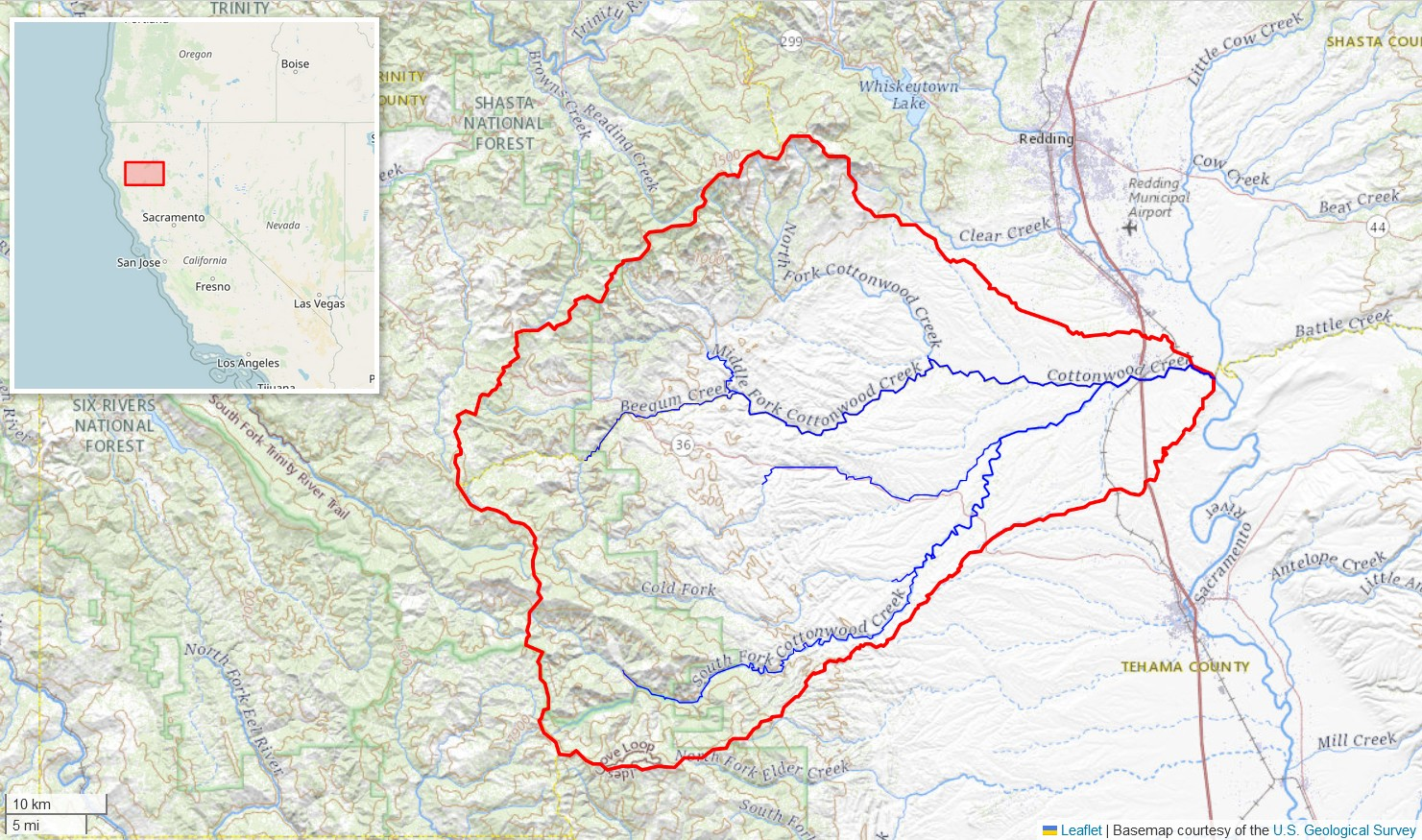
- Cottonwood Creek watershed (Interactive map)

Location
- Country: United States
- State: California

Physical characteristics
- Source: Confluence of North and Middle Forks
  - location: near Janesville
  - coordinates: 40°23′41″N 122°31′33″W
  - elevation: 541 ft (165 m)
- Mouth: Sacramento River
  - location: about 5 miles (8.0 km) east of Cottonwood
  - coordinates: 40°22′40″N 122°11′58″W
  - elevation: 341 ft (104 m)
- Length: 68 mi (109 km)
- Basin size: 938 sq mi (2,430 km^{2})
- Discharge
  - location: Cottonwood, about 2.5 miles (4.0 km) from the mouth
  - average: 874 cu ft/s (24.7 m^{3}/s)
  - minimum: 15 cu ft/s (0.42 m^{3}/s)
  - maximum: 86,000 cu ft/s (2,400 m^{3}/s)

Basin features
- Tributaries
  - left: North Fork Cottonwood Creek, Antelope Creek, Dry Creek
  - right: Middle Fork Cottonwood Creek, Little Dry Creek, South Fork Cottonwood Creek, Patterson Creek

Cottonwood Creek is a major stream and tributary of the Sacramento River in Northern California. About 68 miles (109 km) long measured to its uppermost tributaries, the creek drains a large rural area bounded by the crest of the Coast Ranges, traversing the northwestern Sacramento Valley before emptying into the Sacramento River near the town of Cottonwood. It defines the boundary of Shasta and Tehama counties for its entire length. Because Cottonwood Creek is the largest undammed tributary of the Sacramento River, it is known for its Chinook salmon and steelhead runs.

== Course ==
The headwaters of Cottonwood Creek originates as North, Middle, and South Forks and numerous smaller tributaries along the north-western rim of the Sacramento Valley. The North Fork rises near the 6,122-foot (1,866 m) Shasta Bally, a peak in the southern Klamath Mountains. It flows southwest, through a small reservoir, Rainbow Lake. Below Rainbow Lake it flows south, receiving Jerusalem Creek from the right, and turns east, emerging from the mountains near the town of Ono, where it turns southeast to flow through the Klamath foothills. The larger Middle Fork originates at about 4,000 feet (1,200 m) on McFarland Ridge in the Shasta–Trinity National Forest and flows east to Platina, where it turns briefly north before heading east again, cutting a deep canyon before its confluence with Beegum Creek, its major tributary. Below Beegum Creek it forms the border of Shasta and Tehama counties. The North and Middle Forks join near Janesville to form the main stem of Cottonwood Creek; below this confluence the main stem continues to define the border between the two counties.

The South Fork is the biggest of the three, draining much of the southern half of the watershed. It rises on the south flank of 7,864-foot (2,397 m) North Yolla Bolly Mountain, in the Yolla Bolly–Middle Eel Wilderness, and flows east through the foothills of the Coast Ranges to its confluence with its main tributary, the Cold Fork, from the left. Turning northeast, it is joined by Dry Creek, also from the left, before flowing into the Cottonwood about 2 miles (3.2 km) west of Cottonwood, and 10 miles (16 km) downstream from the confluence of the North and Middle Forks.

The main stem is relatively short, only about 25 miles (40 km) long, and flows almost due east for its entire course, through a wide valley in the foothills. In the first few miles it receives Antelope and Dry Creeks from the north then Little Dry Creek from the south. Below Little Dry Creek the Anderson Cottonwood Canal crosses the creek via an inverted siphon. The South Fork joins at the halfway point between Janesville and the Sacramento River, roughly doubling the flow. At the town of Cottonwood, the creek is crossed by Interstate 5 and the Southern Pacific Railroad. Shortly downstream it is joined by Patterson Creek, its last tributary before it flows into the Sacramento River, about 25 miles (40 km) downstream of Redding and 16 miles (26 km) upstream of Red Bluff.

== Watershed and hydrology ==
The Cottonwood drains a roughly fan-shaped area in the northwestern corner of the Sacramento Valley. The watershed is bounded on the north by the Klamath Mountains, and on the west by the Yolla Bolly Mountains, both part of the larger Coast Ranges. The Klamath mountains rise to elevations of about 4,000 to 5,000 feet (1,200 to 1,500 m), while many higher peaks of the Yolla Bollys exceed 7,000 feet (2,100 m). The watershed is divided into two main vegetation zones, with the foothills consisting mostly of chaparral, blue oak woodland and annual grasses, and the mountains comprising mixed-conifer forests, especially Douglas fir and gray pine. The upper creek and its forks are steep, fast flowing mountain streams with rocky beds. The upper section of the watershed includes significant stands of timber that support a modest logging industry, as well as large tracts of federal National Forest land.

The lower part of the watershed is hilly and has large areas of rangeland. The Cottonwood Creek forms a wide, flat alluvial valley used mainly for agriculture and some gravel mining. Before the area was settled and cultivated, it was mainly wetlands and frequently inundated by flooding, both from Cottonwood Creek itself and from back waters of the Sacramento River. Some riparian zone habitat remains along the lower part of the creek. The watershed is very lightly populated. The largest town is Cottonwood, with a population of 2,960 as of 2000. However, in recent years the area has become proximate to growth of the Redding suburbs.

On the north, the Cottonwood Creek watershed is bordered by those of Clear Creek and much smaller Anderson Creek, both east-flowing tributaries of the Sacramento River, and Reading Creek, a tributary of the Trinity River, part of the Klamath River Basin. On the west, it borders the watersheds of the South Fork Trinity River and its tributary Hayfork Creek. To the southwest, a very short portion of the divide borders the watershed of the Middle Fork Eel River, which drains to the Pacific via the Eel River. The Cottonwood, Trinity and Eel watersheds meet at the triple point at Skylight Ridge, about a mile south of North Yolla Bolly Mountain. Further south, the Cottonwood Creek watershed borders that of Thomes Creek, another major tributary of the Sacramento River.

The annual precipitation in the Cottonwood Creek watershed is 36 inches (910 mm), with a range from 60 inches (1,500 mm) in the mountains to 25 inches (640 mm) in the lowlands. The vast majority occurs between December and April, with the result that the "creek" is often a large river during the winter and spring, while dwindling to a relative trickle in the summer and fall. Because of the relatively low elevation of the watershed, the vast majority of the flow comes from rain, although in some years significant snowpack can accumulate in the mountains and raise flows during a late spring melt. Because of the rugged topography and seasonality of precipitation, the Cottonwood Creek is highly prone to flash flooding. The average annual discharge is about 860 cubic feet per second (24 m^{3}/s); the average summer flow is only 50 to 100 cubic feet per second (1.4 to 2.8 m^{3}/s), while winter flows routinely reach thousands of cubic feet per second.

Cottonwood Creek monthly discharges at Cottonwood (cfs)

== History ==
The area was once inhabited by the Wintu people, who lived in the lowlands of the Cottonwood Creek valley during the winter months, traveling into the mountains in summer to forage. The bands who frequented the Cottonwood area were known as the Nomlaki. The Native Americans lived a hunter-gatherer lifestyle and established few permanent settlements. Before contact with Europeans, the Nomlaki population is estimated to have been greater than 2,000.

The creek was named in 1846 by Captain John C. Frémont ("the Pathfinder") when he was traveling through the area with his soldiers. Frémont described the creek as "wooded on the bottom with oaks, and with cottonwoods along the bed, which is sandy and gravelly. The water was at this time about twenty yards wide, but frequently fifty."

In 1844, Pierson B. Reading had received a land grant from then-governor of Alta California, Manuel Micheltorena. Reading, who eventually settled at a point north of the junction of Cottonwood Creek and the Sacramento River, is considered the first non-Native American settler in the area. (The City of Redding was named for Fort Redding, which in turn received its name from Reading, the original owner of the land.) In March 1848, Reading discovered gold on his land grant, shortly after James Marshall's famous gold strike at Sutter's Mill, which started the California Gold Rush. The gold discovery attracted a wave of prospectors, and later settlers, to the Cottonwood Creek area.

The first permanent American settlement on Cottonwood Creek was established in 1849 or possibly earlier, as a trading post for miners headed to the diggings in the northern Sacramento Valley. The original settlement, the oldest in the Shasta County area, was on the south side of the creek, but eventually development spread to the north, where the town of Cottonwood sits today. Smaller settlements in the Cottonwood Creek area, such as Janesville and Igo, also began as mining boom towns. In 1852, the first post office was established in the Cottonwood area. In 1856, Tehama County was created from the southern part of Shasta County, with the county line drawn along Cottonwood Creek.

In 1851, the Wintu signed the Treaty of Cottonwood Creek, in which they ceded most of their original territory to the United States Government in exchange for reservation lands along the Sacramento River. The state of California opposed the treaty, as it would have restricted the expansion of American settlement into those areas. As a result, the treaty and others like it were never ratified, and native peoples were gradually driven off their lands by the increasing number of miners and settlers in the region.

Although Cottonwood Creek was never the location of major gold strikes, the area was prospected and some hydraulic mining schemes did operate in the basin for a limited period. Hydraulic mining ceased along the creek, and in Northern California as a whole, after large amounts of mine waste and tailings caused damage to water quality and impeded navigation in the Sacramento River.

In 1872, the first train station in Shasta County was constructed in Cottonwood as the Southern Pacific Railroad was extended north towards Oregon. The area soon became the major shipping point for the lumber and livestock exports from Shasta County.

== Dam proposals ==
Since the 1940s, the federal and state governments have considered the damming of Cottonwood Creek for flood control and water supply, specifically for the State Water Project, for which the dams would provide between 185,000 acre⋅ft (0.228 km^{3}) and 205,000 acre⋅ft (0.253 km^{3}). Because Cottonwood Creek is the largest undammed tributary of the Sacramento River, significant amounts of water drain to the Pacific Ocean during winter high flows, and occasionally threaten flood damage in communities along the Sacramento River. Several dams have been proposed for the Cottonwood Creek and its tributaries, including:

- Dutch Gulch Dam on the main stem, 247 feet (75 m) high with a storage capacity of 900,000 acre⋅ft (1.1 km^{3})
- Tehama Dam on the South Fork, 215 feet (66 m) high with storage of 700,000 acre⋅ft (0.86 km^{3})
- Dippingvat Dam on the South Fork, 251 feet (77 m) high with storage of 104,000 acre⋅ft (0.128 km^{3})
- Schoenfield Dam on Red Bank Creek, 300 feet (91 m) high providing storage of 250,000 acre⋅ft (0.31 km^{3})

Although such proposals have been introduced to the legislature numerous times – in the 1960s, 1980s and most recently the late 1990s – the projects were rejected because of stiff local opposition and concerns that the dams would block spawning runs of salmon and steelhead. However, in the 1965 Upper Sacramento River Basin Investigation, the California Department of Water Resources noted that dams could also improve the quality of the remaining spawning habitat by releasing high flows of cold water in the dry season. The releases would also improve the water quality in the main stem of the Sacramento River and in the Sacramento–San Joaquin River Delta, a critical water source for millions of Californians.

There is one small dam (Musselbeck Dam) on the North Fork, which forms the reservoir called Rainbow Lake. The dam was built in 1920 and provides the water supply for several small communities, including Igo and Ono.

== Ecology ==
The Mouth of Cottonwood Creek Wildlife Area, located at the confluence of Cottonwood Creek and the Sacramento River, has been designated to preserve about 1,100 acres (450 ha) of riparian and wetland habitat. The area is divided into two units of about equal size, the Balls Ferry and Cottonwood Creek Wetlands Units. Major tree species are cottonwood, Oregon ash and willow. The area provides habitat for ring-tailed cat, river otters and beavers, and many bird species, including Swainson's hawks and bald eagles. Hunting is allowed, though there are no staff or facilities available.

The Cottonwood and several of its perennial tributaries provide 130 miles (210 km) of spawning habitat for spring and fall run Chinook salmon and steelhead (rainbow trout). Due to gold mining in the 19th century, and extensive use of the watershed for logging and ranching since then, the creek has experienced sedimentation, which is detrimental to these anadromous fish populations. The spring Chinook salmon run has suffered more, with only one or two fish returning each year between 2011 and 2014. By contrast, the returning fall Chinook numbered 1,940 in 2014. The steelhead population was not monitored, but is federally listed as threatened along with the spring Chinook run.

State and federal agencies have collaborated on watershed restoration work, including the removal of man-made barriers to fish migration, decommissioning of old logging roads and installation of culverts to reduce erosion. In September 2014, the Hammer Dam on the South Fork of Cottonwood Creek was removed, opening up 5 miles (8.0 km) of habitat for spring-run Chinook and steelhead. As of 2009, the U.S. Fish and Wildlife Service has allocated $10 million for watershed restoration projects.

== See also ==
- List of rivers of California
