= H47 =

H47 may refer to:

- Boeing-Vertol H-47 Chinook, an American helicopter
- HMS Blanche (H47), a Royal Navy B-class destroyer
- HMS H47, a Royal Navy H-class submarine
- Hyampom Airport, in Trinity County, California, United States
