= Cold Fork, California =

Unincorporated community in California, United States

Coordinates: 40°10′19″N 122°40′24″W

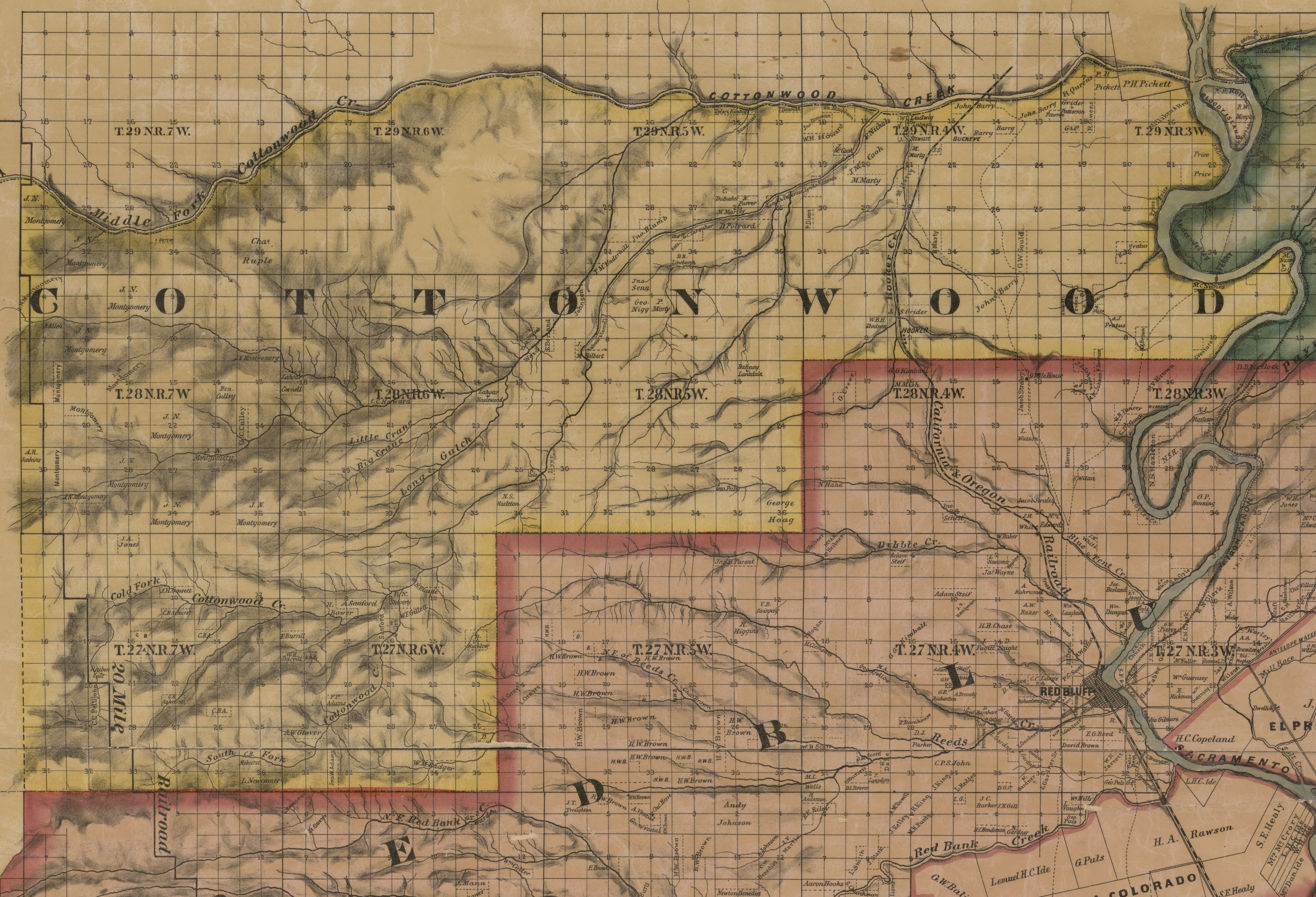
Cottonwood District, Tehama County, California, mapped 1878, the Cold Fork–Pettyjohn location is on the far left

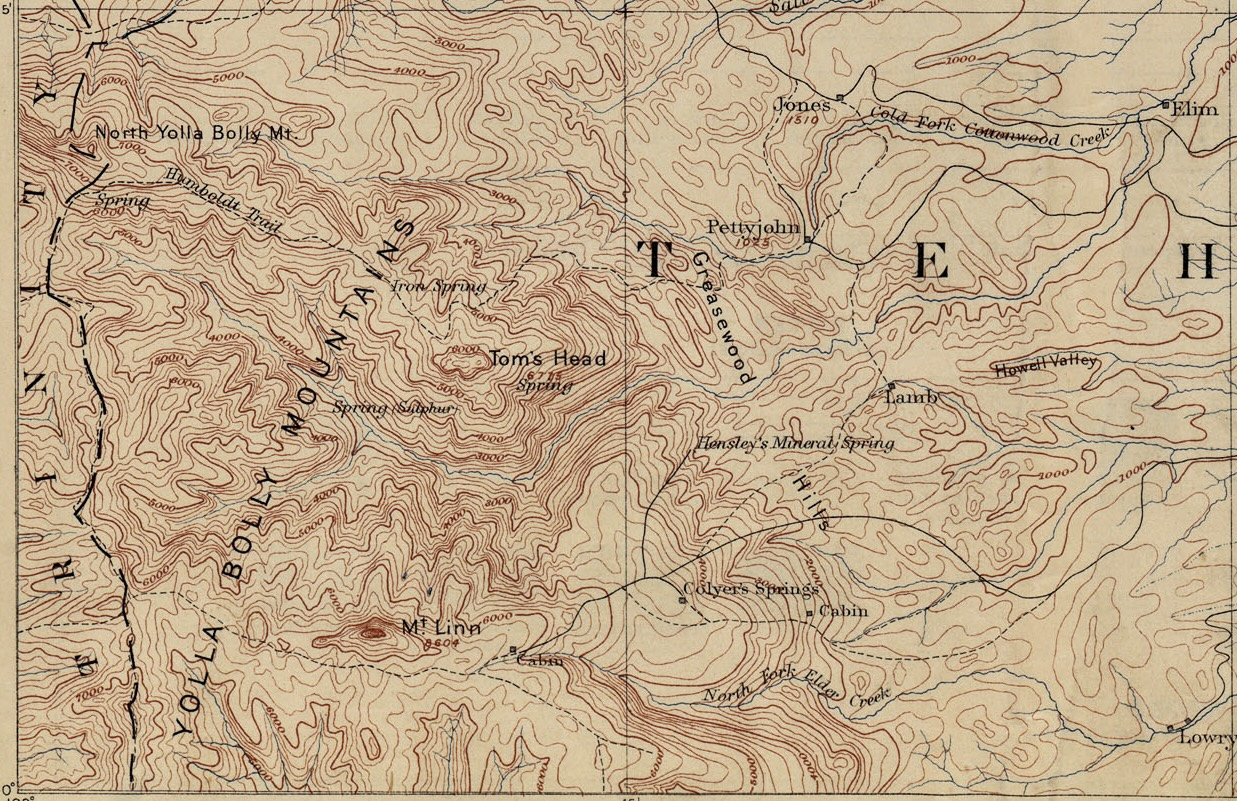
Pettyjohn and Cold Fork Creek on an 1884 topographical map of the Red Bluff area. The dotted line beginning at Jones and passing over the Greasewood Hills is the Humboldt Trail.

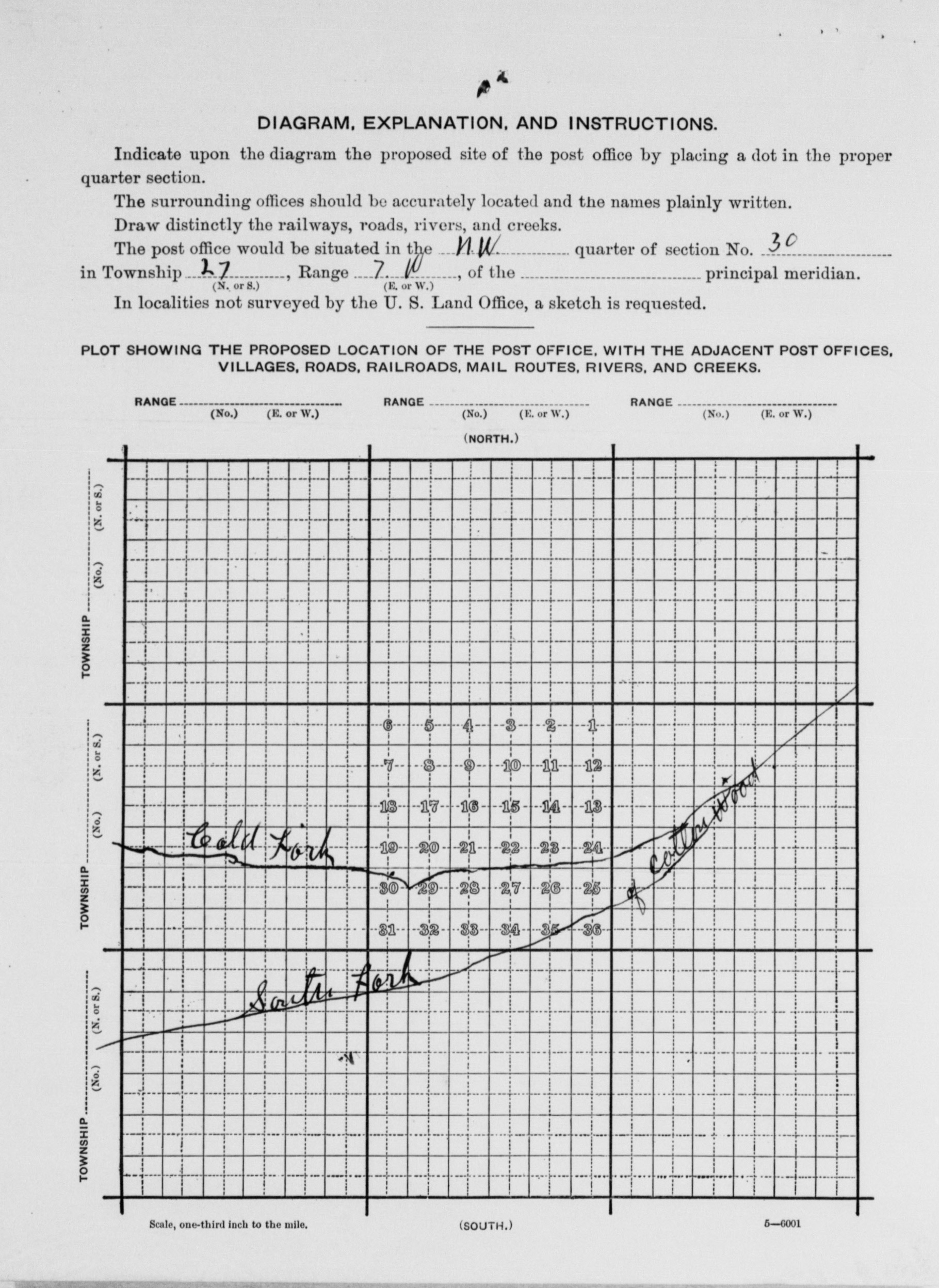
Cold Fork location on section 30 of Township 27 of Tehama County (1914)

Cold Fork, California is a historical crossroads and small settlement along Cold Fork Creek, a river tributary of the Cottonwood Creek in Tehama County, in the U.S. state of California, recorded on some historical maps as a district. The tributary, which is a fork of the South Fork of Cottonwood Creek, rises on the east slope of North Yolla Bolly Mountain, and flows generally east from there for about 22 miles (35 km) falling from an altitude of 6,000 feet (1,800 m) above sea level to 5,200 feet (1,600 m).

According to local residents at Hunters (see later) it was known as Cold Fork simply because the water was cold. Anecdotally it was also known as Cole Fork after a local resident named Cole, although there is little historical evidence of this on maps.

In 1876 it bordered on C. Petty John's Farm. Pettyjohn, as it later became known, was a stopping place. It was on the wagon road to Hay Fork. The Humboldt Trail, also known as the Red Bluff to Humboldt Trail, between the inland valleys and the coast, also used to pass by Pettyjohn in the 19th century, beginning at a place known as Jones further along Cold Fork and taking a meandering path that does not strictly follow the line of the Fork. It followed the route of a Native American trail passing by North Yolla Bolly Mountain, and was used by 19th century settlers initially for livestock and later as a general supply trail.

The "Pettijohn country," as it was sometimes called, was described in 1928 as a rugged area that was somewhat difficult to navigate. In 1975 and 1960 (the latter extended to 1967) studies were done on the Pettyjohn Range, one of four sites studied, as to the feasibility of brush removal and converting chemise to grassland for farming livestock.

There are indications in historical records that Pettyjohn Place was the location of a Civilian Conservation Corps camp.

During a drought in 1883, stockmen were scraping "six feet in the creek bed" to find water for animals. A male mountain lion killed near Cold Fork was one of several killed in 1921 by an officer of the California Fish and Game Commission.

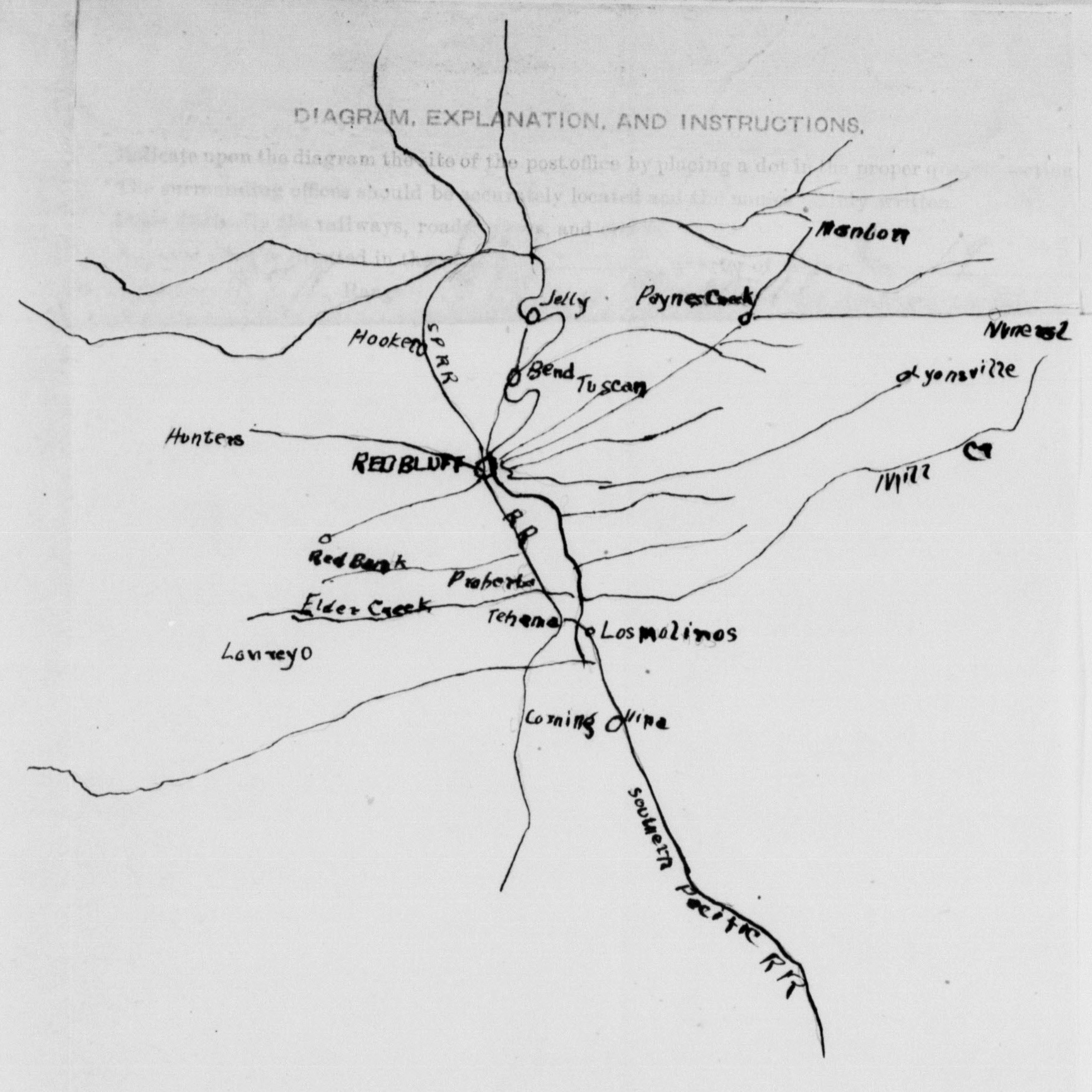
Location of Hunters relative to Red Bluff (1915)

Hunters was a post office to the north of Cold Fork, which also had a nearby school, Hunter School, approximately 1.5 miles (2.4 km) north of Cold Fork on what was in 1997 still named Hunter Road. There was a school at Cold Fork itself in 1888 and 1891 but in 1892 Cold Fork schools were declared "lapsed" and merged with the Hunter schools. A post office was established at Cold Fork in 1915, 15 miles (24 km) southwest of Hunters, and remained in operation until 1920 when it moved to Hunters. Its postmaster in 1918 was Laura French Heitman. After the post office closed, the building became a residence.

Nothing remained of Hunters as of 1997 except a cattle ranch.
