= Beegum Creek =

Location
- Country: United States
- State: California

Physical characteristics
- Mouth
  - coordinates: 40°21′56″N 122°44′41″W

Beegum Creek is a stream located in Shasta and Tehama counties, southwest of Redding in the U.S. state of California. The stream cuts through Beegum Gorge and runs 16 miles (26 km) before it empties into Cottonwood Creek.

The creek derives its name from nearby Beegum Peak, so named due to its shape. Bee gum is a term originating in the American South, which in the 1850s was used to describe beehives in a hollow gum tree or made of boards.

== Ecology ==
Beegum Creek is a habitat for many threatened and sensitive species of fish and wildlife, such as Chinook salmon, steelhead, the California red-legged frog, and the foothill yellow-legged frog. The area surrounding the creek is characterized by oak woodland, grassland, and chaparral, and is home to the northern spotted owl, as well as osprey and bald eagle.

== Mining history ==
The Beegum area attracted prospectors and miners during the California Gold Rush, most of whom were disappointed. In 1916, Joseph Selvester and James Wilson established a prospect on the South Fork Trail, where they found mixed manganese oxides.

According to the Mineral Resource Data System (MRDS), the Beegum Creek placer mine is a producer of gold, platinum, osmium, and iridium.
