= Peanut, California =

Unincorporated community in California

- Unincorporated community
- Location within California Location within the United States
- Coordinates: 40°28′05″N 123°10′07″W
- Country: United States
- State: California
- County: Trinity
- Elevation: 2,500 ft (762 m)
- Time zone: UTC−8 (Pacific (PST))
  - Summer (DST): UTC−7 (PDT)
- Area code: 530
- GNIS feature ID: 264592

Peanut is an unincorporated area in Trinity County, California, United States. Previously called Salt Creek, it is located on Highway 3, south of Hayfork, at an elevation of 2,500 feet (760 m).

As many as 100 people once lived there. In 2018, KQED reported that there were "just a few old horse barns and a few dozen residents nearby".

== History ==
Prior to the arrival of settlers, the place that became known as Peanut was inhabited by the Wintu tribe.

In the late 19th century, the area was referred to as Salt Creek. It was a stopping point on the trail from nearby Weaverville to the California coast, offering fresh water and a natural spring. With its cool, mountainous climate, the area is inhospitable to growing peanuts.

The town used to be on Highway 36 until the highway was adjusted, straightening and improving the quality of its route – this was done to provide shorter travels between Red Bluff and the coast, and eliminate a detour into Eureka from Fortuna to Route 299.

=== Origins of name ===
In 1898, settlers in Salt Creek, which had a general store called Cuff's, decided to apply for a post office. At the time, the nearest post office was in Hayfork, a seven-mile journey by horse. The name "Salt Creek" was deemed unsuitable because of a United States Board on Geographic Names rule which required single-word town names.

According to California Place Names, the petitioners originally considered naming the town after Mrs. Cuff. When they discussed their application with the postmaster at Weaverville, A. L. Paulsen, he suggested the name "Peanut" instead because it was unique; no other post office in the directory had its name. The postmaster's own fondness of peanuts is also often cited as the reason for his choice. According to the memoir of Salt Creek schoolteacher Joe McKnight, Paulsen was eating peanuts when he suggested the name.

The petitioners added Peanut to their application as one of their choices. The United States Post Office Department approved the name Peanut on January 20, 1900.

== Local economy ==
Although the town was too small to have its own saloon, during Prohibition bootleggers from Peanut became well known locally for supplying high-quality liquor.

Peanut once had a sawmill which burned down in the 1940s, or mid-1950s.

In 1970, the owner of land where the town of Peanut once stood, Woody Smith of San Jose, put his 12-acre parcel up for sale.

== Popularity ==
Peanut became popular with tourists during the presidency of Jimmy Carter, a former peanut farmer. In 1979, a local resident told the Sacramento Bee that tourists came looking for the Peanut post office, because they wanted to "mail a post card with the Peanut postmark." They also said that road maps of the area often included Peanut purely due to the novelty of its name.
