= California State Route 263 =

Highway in California

State Route 263
- SR 263 highlighted in red

Route information
- Maintained by Caltrans
- Length: 8.125 mi (13.076 km)

Major junctions
- South end: SR 3 in Yreka
- North end: SR 96 near Yreka

Location
- Country: United States
- State: California
- Counties: Siskiyou

Highway system
- State highways in California; Interstate; US; State; Scenic; History; Pre‑1964; Unconstructed; Deleted; Freeways
← SR 262	→ SR 265

State Route 263 (SR 263) is a state highway in the U.S. state of California in Siskiyou County, running parallel to Interstate 5 to the west. Route 263 connects State Route 3 near the north city limits of Yreka to State Route 96 eight miles (13 km) north. Although SR 263 was once part of U.S. Route 99, it is not signed as part Business Loop 5.

== Route description ==
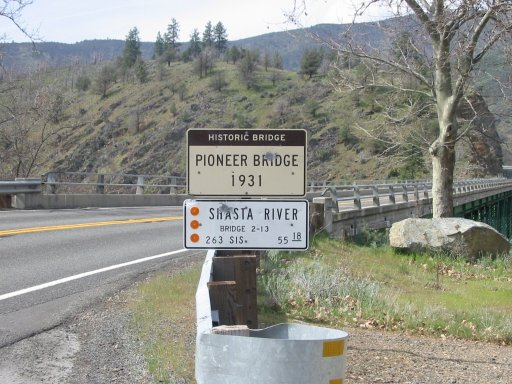
SR 263 at Pioneer Bridge

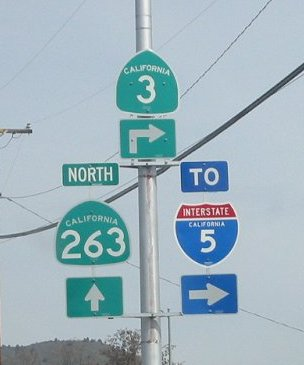
Southern terminus of SR 263 (northbound view)

Route 263 is defined in section 563 of the California Streets and Highways Code, and that the highway is "from Route 3 near the north city limits of Yreka northeasterly to Route 96 near the confluence of the Shasta and Klamath Rivers".

SR 263 begins at a junction with State Route 3 just north of Yreka. The highway then heads northward through Siskiyou County, roughly lying parallel to the Shasta River. The road is also roughly aligned with nearby Interstate 5 as it passes through hilly terrain. The road ends at State Route 96, which continues northward to meet up with Interstate 5.

SR 263 is part of the National Highway System, a network of highways that are considered essential to the country's economy, defense, and mobility by the Federal Highway Administration.

== Major intersections ==
Except where prefixed with a letter, postmiles were measured on the road as it was in 1964, based on the alignment of U.S. Route 99 as it existed at that time, and do not necessarily reflect current mileage. Postmile prefixes include: R reflecting a realignment in the route since then, M indicating a second realignment, L referring to an overlap due to a correction or change, and T indicating postmiles classified as temporary. Segments that remain unconstructed or have been relinquished to local control may be omitted. The entire route is in Siskiyou County.

Location	Postmile	Destinations	Notes
Yreka	49.07	SR 3 (Montague Road, North Main Street) / Tebbe Street – Montague, Etna	South end of SR 263
	57.20	SR 96 (Klamath River Highway) to I-5	North end of SR 263
1.000 mi = 1.609 km; 1.000 km = 0.621 mi
