= Zogg Fire =

2020 wildfire in Northern California

- Part of the 2020 California wildfires
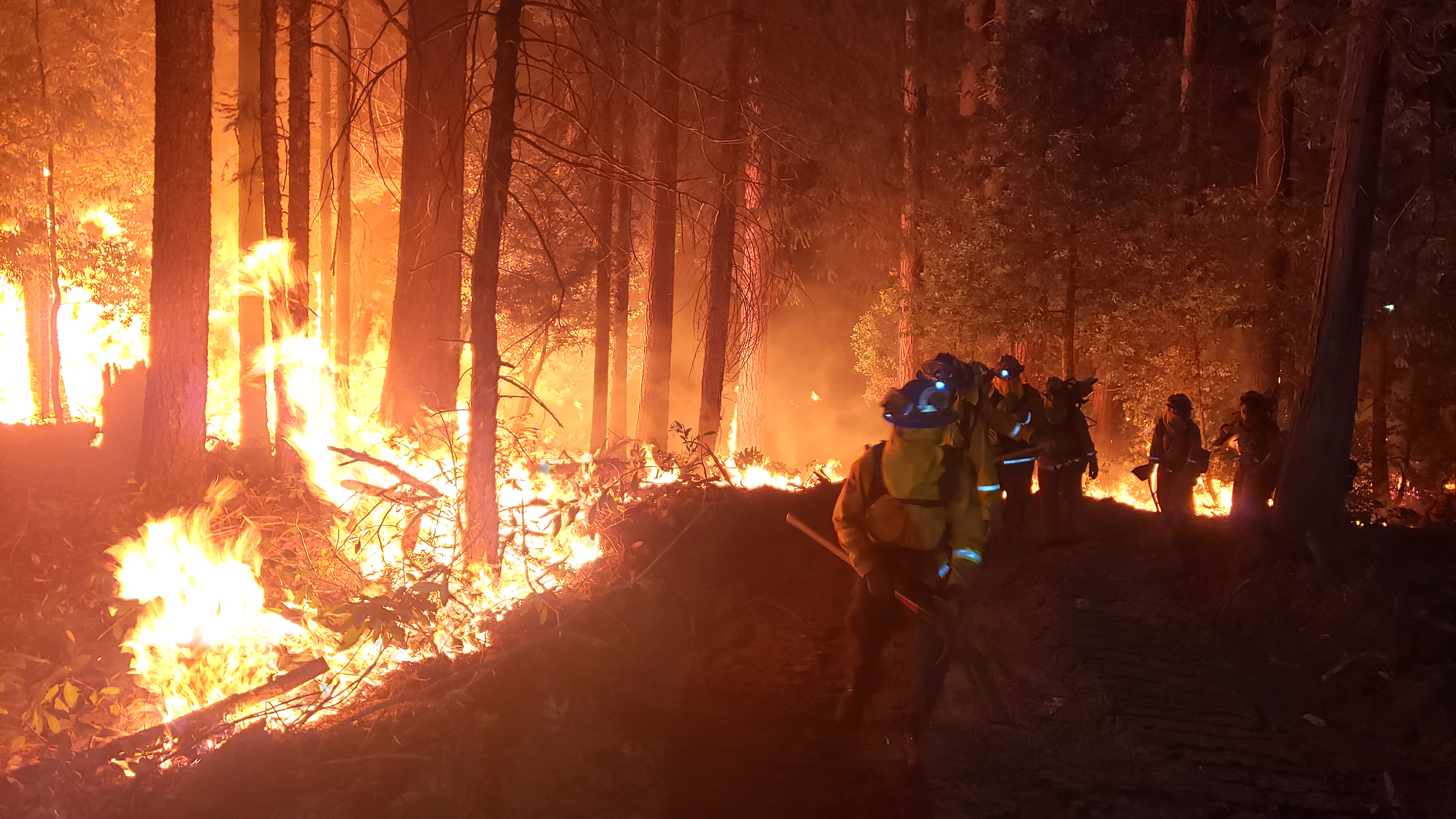
- A firefighting handcrew protects homes from the Zogg Fire near Igo on October 2
- Date: September 27, 2020 –; October 13, 2020
- Location: Shasta County & Tehama County, California, United States
- Coordinates: 40.53927°N 122.56656°W

Statistics
- Burned area: 56,338 acres (22,799 ha)

Impacts
- Deaths: 4
- Injuries: 1
- Structures lost: 204 destroyed and 27 damaged

Ignition
- Cause: Trees contacting PG&E distribution line

Map
- Location in California

Location of Zogg Fire

The Zogg Fire (named that because it started at Zogg Mine Road and Jenny Bird Lane) was a wildfire that burned 56,338 acres (22,799 ha) in southwestern Shasta County and northwestern Tehama County, which are both in California, in the United States, as part of the severe 2020 California wildfire season. The fire was first reported on September 27, 2020 and was not fully contained until October 13, 2020, by which time it had destroyed much of the communities of Igo and Ono, killing four people and destroying 204 buildings.

== Progression ==
The fire was first reported at 2:51 PM PDT on September 27, 2020. The fire quickly spread from an initial estimate of 100 acres (40 ha) to 7,000 acres (2,800 ha) by the night of September 27. By the morning of September 28, the fire had more than doubled to 15,000 acres (6,100 ha). The fire grew further on September 28 to over 31,000 acres (12,545 ha). As of October 13, the Zogg fire had burned 56,338 acres (22,799 ha) and was fully contained.

== Effects ==
The fire destroyed 204 buildings, including multiple historic buildings in Ono, and killed four people as of October 13, 2020.

Most of Shasta County west of Clear Creek between Whiskeytown Lake and Highway 36, including Igo, Ono, Platina, Happy Valley, and Whiskeytown National Recreation Area, were evacuated.

A mobile registration van was set up at the Igo Ono School in November 2020, to help victims register for FEMA disaster relief. The van also provided victims with information and Right of Entry forms to help begin the clean up process for their homes.

Three orphaned mountain lions were released from care and moved to an exhibit at the Columbus Zoo and Aquarium in December 2020. The cubs had been discovered separately by firefighters, during the fire and at least one was mistaken for a household cat.

== Investigation and litigation ==
On October 8, 2020, equipment from the Pacific Gas and Electric Company was seized as part of an ongoing investigation into the company’s role in the fire. On October 13, a judge asked the PG&E to explain their role in the fire. It was announced on November 23 that remains of a grey pine tree that was near the area that the fire began had been seized by state fire investigators as evidence whether the tree was a part of the start of the fire. The tree reportedly had been potentially identified for removal, but had not been removed after the Carr Fire in 2018. In March 2021, investigations concluded the fire began when a grey pine tree fell on power lines belonging to the Pacific Gas and Electric Company (PG&E).

=== Litigation ===
The Zogg Fire and PG&E's role in its ignition prompted multiple lawsuits against the company.

In 2021, the California Public Utilities Commission proposed fining PG&E more than $155 million for its failure to remove the grey pine.

==== Cal Fire civil lawsuit ====
In February 2022, Cal Fire filed a lawsuit against PG&E, seeking reimbursement for approximately $33 million in fire suppression costs and legal fees.

==== Shasta County criminal charges ====
On September 24, 2021, the Shasta County District Attorney's Office filed criminal charges against PG&E, alleging involuntary manslaughter as one of 31 total charges. On February 1, 2023, a Shasta County judge dismissed 20 charges but ruled that there was sufficient evidence for PG&E to face trial for the remaining 11 felony and misdemeanor charges, including involuntary manslaughter. PG&E was scheduled for arraignment on February 15. Individual company employees and officials have not been charged, and so if found guilty PG&E would face fines and court-ordered corrective measures. On May 30, 2023, a judge dismissed the charges against PG&E, saying there was not enough evidence to support the charge that PG&E had known about the risk. At the same time, PG&E reached a $50 million dollar settlement agreement with the Shasta County District Attorney's office, with $45 million going to organizations helping victims and rebuilding, and $5 million in civil penalties to the county.
