= Mountain Valley Unified School District =

School district in California, United States

Address
- 231 Oak Avenue Hayfork, California, 96041; United States

District information
- Type: Public
- Grades: K–12
- NCES District ID: 0600018

Students and staff
- Students: 308 (2020–2021)
- Teachers: 19.13 (FTE)
- Staff: 29.17 (FTE)
- Student–teacher ratio: 16.1:1

Other information
- Website: www.mvusd.us

Mountain Valley Unified School District is a public school district based in Trinity County, California, United States.

== Demographics ==
By 2017 the 280 student MVUSD had 30 Hmong students. Superintendent Debbie Miller stated that the influx of Hmong had reversed a previous trend of enrollment decline and that the district administration wishes for more Hmong to move to the district. She added that "We’ve scrambled to figure out how we can incorporate their traditions."
