= Ono, California =

Unincorporated community in California, United States

- Unincorporated community Census-designated place
- Location in California Ono, California (the United States)
- Coordinates: 40°28′35.14″N 122°37′4.65″W
- Country: United States
- State: California
- County: Shasta County

Area
  - Total: 1.907 sq mi (4.94 km^{2})
  - Land: 1.904 sq mi (4.93 km^{2})
  - Water: 0.003 sq mi (0.0078 km^{2})
- Elevation: 1,243 ft (379 m)

Population (2020)
  - Total: 93
  - Density: 49/sq mi (19/km^{2})
- Time zone: UTC-8 (Pacific)
  - Summer (DST): UTC-7 (PDT)
- GNIS feature ID: 2813354

Ono is an unincorporated community and census-designated place (CDP) in Shasta County, California, United States. Ono's center is on County Road A16, locally known as Platina Road, the village's only access to the rest of the world. It is about 5 miles (8.0 km) from its neighbor, Igo, and about 17 miles (27 km) from Redding, the county seat. Its population is 93 as of the 2020 census.

According to tradition, the community was named for the answer ("Oh, no") usually given by a 49er California Gold Rush miner to his son when asked if the latter could accompany his father to work. The name might instead be biblical in origin.

Ono is a community in slow decline, which began in the late 1970s when it lost its primary school and post office to its local neighbor, Igo.

In 2020, the Zogg Fire destroyed several buildings in Ono, including the Ono Store and Ono Grange.

== Climate ==
According to the Köppen Climate Classification system, Ono has a warm-summer Mediterranean climate, abbreviated "Csa" on climate maps.

== Demographics ==
Historical population
Census	Pop.	Note	%±
2020	93		—
U.S. Decennial Census; 1850–1870 1880-1890; 1900 1910 1920; 1930 1940 1950; 1960 1970 1980; 1990 2000 2010; 2020

Ono first appeared as a census designated place in the 2020 U.S. census.

=== 2020 Census ===
Ono CDP, California – Racial and ethnic composition Note: the US Census treats Hispanic/Latino as an ethnic category. This table excludes Latinos from the racial categories and assigns them to a separate category. Hispanics/Latinos may be of any race.
Race / Ethnicity (NH = Non-Hispanic)	Pop 2020	% 2020
White alone (NH)	77	82.80%
Black or African American alone (NH)	0	0.00%
Native American or Alaska Native alone (NH)	1	1.08%
Asian alone (NH)	2	2.15%
Pacific Islander alone (NH)	0	0.00%
Other race alone (NH)	1	1.08%
Mixed race or Multiracial (NH)	6	6.45%
Hispanic or Latino (any race)	6	6.45%
Total	93	100.00%
