= Forest Glen, California =

Unincorporated community in California, United States

- Unincorporated community
- Location within California Location within the United States
- Coordinates: 40°22′24″N 123°19′31″W
- Country: United States
- State: California
- County: Trinity
- Elevation: 2,274 ft (693 m)
- Time zone: UTC-8 (Pacific (PST))
  - Summer (DST): UTC-7 (PDT)
- Area code: 530
- GNIS feature ID: 1656025

Forest Glen is an unincorporated community in Trinity County, California, United States. Forest Glen is located on California State Route 36, 14.5 miles (23.3 km) south-southwest of Hayfork. With a population of approximately 10 permanent residents and 20 seasonal Forest Service cabin owners, visitors often drive right through in 30 seconds, little realizing there was a town. The town sits along the South Fork Trinity River, with several cabins located near Glen Creek. There are also two campgrounds near the town. The terrain in the area is very steep and rugged.

== History ==
In 1913, Arthur H. Jeans built a waystation for travellers on the new Red Bluff-Eureka road, now known as State Route 36, at Forest Glen, then known as Auto Rest. It included a resort, a hotel, a store, a stable, and a garage, and was reputed to be Trinity County's most popular resort before it burnt to the ground in 1950. The Forest Glen Store stayed open for longer but closed by the early 2000s. As of 2020, CalFire recently reopened a station in Forest Glen, with one engine. A post office called Auto Rest ran from September 13, 1917, until March 9, 1920, when the name was changed to Forest Glen. Arthur Jeans was the first postmaster, succeeded by Charles H. Matthews on July 21, 1919.

== Geography ==
Forest Glen is situated at the base of South Fork Mountain, the longest continuous ridge line in North America. State Route 36, locally known as 36, passes through the community. The South Fork of the Trinity River, one of California's longest undammed river systems, also runs through the community. A Forest Service campground, Scott Flat, is located immediately southwest of the community. Scott Flat also serves as the trailhead for the South Fork Trinity National Recreation Trail.

== Climate ==
A public weather station ran at Forest Glen from 1930 to 1985. Forest Glen is reputed to be one of the wettest places in Trinity County, with over 60 inches of precipitation over the weather station's period of record. The weather station recorded a record high of 110 degrees Fahrenheit on August 8, 1959 and a record low of -2 degrees on December 11, 1932. The average July high and low were 91 and 46 degrees, and for January, it was 44.9 and 26.6 degrees, respectively. The first and last months with average lows above freezing were April and October, with lows of 33.2 and 35.2 respectively. The area is very Mediterranean, with 92% of the precipitation between October 1 and May 31 and 77% between November 1 and March 31. The average precipitation for January is 11.61 inches, and for July it is 0.22 inches. There is an annual precipitation average of 63.52 inches. There is measurable precipitation on 88 days of the year, and 21 days see more than an inch of precipitation. Forest Glen sees about 40 inches of snowfall each winter, ranging from none recorded to 103 inches throughout record. The record high snow depth is 43 inches, seen on January 3, 1965 and February 3, 1937. An average of 59.4 days a year reach 90 degrees, and 136.9 dip to 32 degrees, including 0.9 in June. Forest Glen has seen frost every month of the year, but the 30% chance date in the spring is in mid-June, and in the fall it is mid-to-late-September. On average, the highest temperature Forest Glen will see in a year is 103 degrees, and the lowest is 11 degrees. In January 1949, the average low was 11.84 degrees, the lowest monthly average low on record, and the highest monthly average low was July 1958, with 51.19 degrees. The highest average high was July 1952, with 97.52 degrees, and the lowest monthly average high was January 1937, with 37.68 degrees. The wettest winter was 1973–74, with 112.14 inches of precipitation, but 1982-83 was close behind with 106.88 inches.

A major flood event occurred in the winter of 1964–65. It is known as the Christmas Flood of 1964, and it was one of the biggest, if not the biggest, floods in California history. Forest Glen recorded over 33 inches of precipitation in December 1964, which led to 20,000 cubic feet per second discharge at the South Fork Trinity River gauge Forest Glen in mid-December. The flood caused widespread damage across the watershed, most notably the complete devastation of the salmon and steelhead fisheries due to topsoil erosion in the watershed on logged areas. The runs of fish have never fully recovered. If a similar event were to happen today, the effects would likely be much less devastating as nearly all logging in the watershed has ceased, and has not resumed in the past 30 years.
