= North Yolla Bolly Mountain =

Mountain peak in the Coast Ranges in Northern California

North Yolla Bolly
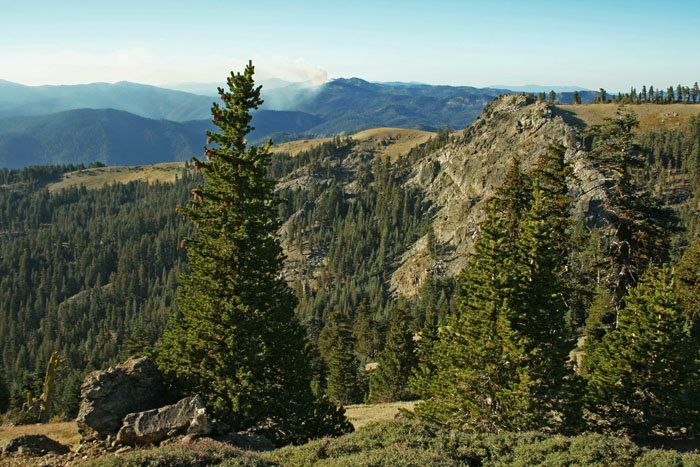
- View of the Yolla Bolly-Middle Eel Wilderness from the summit of North Yolla Bolly

Highest point
- Elevation: 7,868 ft (2,398 m)
- Prominence: 2,155 ft (657 m)
- Parent peak: Mount Linn
- Isolation: 12.72 mi (20.47 km)
- Listing: California Coastal Peak List
- Coordinates: 40°11′46″N 122°58′25″W

Naming
- English translation: "Snowy Peak"
- Language of name: Wintu

Geography
- Location within California
- Location: Trinity County, California
- Parent range: Klamath Mountains
- Topo map: USGS North Yolla Bolly Mountains

North Yolla Bolly Mountain (usually referred to as North Yolla Bolly) is a 7,868-foot (2,398 m) peak in the Klamath Mountains of the Coast Ranges located in Trinity County, Northern California. The mountain is located in an isolated part of the Yolla Bolly-Middle Eel Wilderness, in the Shasta-Trinity National Forest, about 50 miles (80 km) west of Red Bluff. It is situated about 13 miles (21 km) from Mount Linn (South Yolla Bolly), the highest point of the Coast Ranges south of the Trinity Alps.

North Yolla Bolly is located only a mile southeast of 7,755-foot (2,364 m) Black Rock Mountain, often considered its sister peak. Together, the two summits and the cluster of surrounding peaks in the immediate vicinity are sometimes called the "North Yolla Bolly Mountains", although this grouping, high peaks of the California Coast Ranges, itself a segment the Pacific Coast Ranges that extend from coastal Mexico to Alaska, is not considered a true, stand-apart mountain range. A small glacial tarn, North Yolla Bolly Lake, is located in a cirque on its north slope. The area is accessible by a trail from Stuart Gap. On a clear day, one can see Mount Shasta and Lassen Peak as well as the Sierra Nevada from the summit of North Yolla Bolly.

The mountain divides the headwaters of the South Fork Trinity River and Cottonwood Creek. A spur of the mountain, Skylight Ridge, touches the headwaters of the Middle Fork Eel River, making it the triple point between the Klamath, Sacramento and Eel River systems, the three largest waterways of Northern California.

"Yolla Bolly" is a Wintu word meaning "snowy peak". The mountain is one of numerous high peaks in the alpine Coast Ranges crest––extending from Snow Mountain National Wilderness (north of Lake Berryessa, less than two hours drive from the Bay Area) to Del Norte at the Oregon border––to receive substantial annual snowfall in the winter.
