= Beegum Peak =

Mountain in California, United States

Coordinates: 40.3139°N 122.8871°W

Beegum Peak is a summit in the U.S. state of California. The elevation is 3,891 feet (1,186 m).

Beegum Peak was so named on account of its shape, likened to a beehive; "beegum" is a Southern word for "beehive". A variant name is "Bee Gum Butte".
