= Hyampom, California =

Hyampom
- census-designated place
- Location of Hyampom in Trinity County, California.

- Position in California.
- Coordinates: 40°37′02″N 123°27′09″W
- Country: United States
- State: California
- County: Trinity

Area
  - Total: 20.273 sq mi (52.507 km^{2})
  - Land: 20.273 sq mi (52.507 km^{2})
  - Water: 0 sq mi (0 km^{2}) 0%
- Elevation: 1,322 ft (403 m)

Population (2020)
  - Total: 241
  - Density: 11.9/sq mi (4.59/km^{2})
- Time zone: UTC-8 (Pacific (PST))
  - Summer (DST): UTC-7 (PDT)
- ZIP Code: 96046
- Area code: 530
- GNIS feature ID: 261667

Hyampom (Wintu: Xaayin-pom) is an unincorporated community and census-designated place (CDP) in Trinity County, California, United States.

Hyampom is at an elevation of 1,322 feet (403 m) in the Trinity Mountains. Its population was 241 as of the 2020 census, unchanged from the 2010 census.

== History ==
The name "Hyampom" is said to have derived from a Wintu language term xaayin-pom, meaning "slippery place." Hyampom was home to the Whilkut, Chimariko, and Northern Wintun Native American tribes. The explorer Jedediah Strong Smith visited Hyampom in April 1828. The first non-native settler in the area was Hank Young, who moved to Hyampom on January 12, 1855.

== Geography ==
According to the United States Census Bureau, the CDP covers an area of 20.3 square miles (53 km^{2}), all land.

=== Climate ===
This region experiences warm and dry summers, with no average monthly temperature above 71.6 °F. According to the Köppen climate classification system, Hyampom has a warm-summer Mediterranean climate, abbreviated "Csb" on climate maps. Despite the warm-summer classification, daily highs reach above 90 degrees Fahrenheit on almost all days in summer, but the marine-influenced night temperatures are almost always below 60 degrees and most often around 50. There is snow in the winter, but the elevation is too low for significant snowfall. The nearest large town, Hayfork, which is 700 feet above Hyampom at 2,200 feet, gets approximately 20 to 25 inches of snow per year, and the nearest comparable weather station, at Big Flat on the Trinity River, gets 6.7 inches per year. Precipitation totals around 40 to 45 inches a year.

Hyampom

Climate chart (precipitation, max. and min. temperature)
J	F	M	A	M	J	J	A	S	O	N	D
8.5 50 34	6.7 56 35	5.8 62 36	2.3 69 39	1.7 78 44	0.3 87 49	0.2 96 54	0.2 96 52	0.6 90 48	2 75 41	6.5 57 39	9.7 48 34
- █ Average max. and min. temperatures in °F
- █ Precipitation totals in inches
- Source: https://prism.oregonstate.edu/explorer/
Metric conversion
J	F	M	A	M	J	J	A	S	O	N	D
215 10 1	170 13 2	146 17 2	58 21 4	42 26 7	7.1 31 9	4.3 36 12	4.3 36 11	15 32 9	52 24 5	164 14 4	246 9 1
- █ Average max. and min. temperatures in °C
- █ Precipitation totals in mm

== Demographics ==
Historical population
Census	Pop.	Note	%±
2010	241		—
2020	241		0.0%
U.S. Decennial Census; 2010

Hyampom first appeared as a census designated place in the 2010 U.S. census.

The 2020 United States census reported that Hyampom had a population of 241. The population density was 11.9 inhabitants per square mile (4.6/km^{2}). The racial makeup of Hyampom was 200 (83.0%) White, 2 (0.8%) African American, 2 (0.8%) Native American, 9 (3.7%) Asian, 0 (0.0%) Pacific Islander, 11 (4.6%) from other races, and 17 (7.1%) from two or more races. Hispanic or Latino of any race were 14 persons (5.8%).

The whole population lived in households. There were 114 households, out of which 28 (24.6%) had children under the age of 18 living in them, 45 (39.5%) were married-couple households, 7 (6.1%) were cohabiting couple households, 15 (13.2%) had a female householder with no partner present, and 47 (41.2%) had a male householder with no partner present. 39 households (34.2%) were one person, and 11 (9.6%) were one person aged 65 or older. The average household size was 2.11. There were 61 families (53.5% of all households).

The age distribution was 25 people (10.4%) under the age of 18, 14 people (5.8%) aged 18 to 24, 85 people (35.3%) aged 25 to 44, 40 people (16.6%) aged 45 to 64, and 77 people (32.0%) who were 65 years of age or older. The median age was 42.6 years. There were 149 males and 92 females.

There were 148 housing units at an average density of 7.3 units per square mile (2.8 units/km^{2}), of which 114 (77.0%) were occupied. Of these, 84 (73.7%) were owner-occupied, and 30 (26.3%) were occupied by renters.

== Infrastructure ==
There is no local school. Children attend classes in Hayfork.

Hyampom Airport
- IATA: none; ICAO: none; FAA LID: H47

Summary
- Airport type: Public
- Owner: Trinity County
- Serves: Hyampom, California
- Elevation AMSL: 1,250 ft (380 m)
- Coordinates: 40°37′31″N 123°28′06″W
- Interactive map of Hyampom Airport

Runways
Direction	Length		Surface
Direction	ft	m	Surface
14/32	2,980	908	Asphalt

Statistics (2005)
- Aircraft operations: 2,000
- Source: Federal Aviation Administration

Hyampom Airport (FAA LID: H47, formerly Q75) is a county-owned public-use airport and residential airpark 1 mile (1.6 km) northwest of Hyampom's central business district and bordering the South Fork Trinity River on its west side.

Hyampom has condominiums on a 4-acre (16,000 m^{2}) parcel on the airport, with designated tie-downs 200 feet (61 m) away through a private gate.

The airport covers an area of 40 acres (16 ha) which contains one runway designated 14/32 with a 2,980 by 60 feet (908 m × 18 m) asphalt pavement. For the 2005 calendar year, the airport had 2,000 general aviation aircraft operations, an average of 5 per day.

== Politics ==
In the state legislature, Hyampom is in the 2nd senatorial district, represented by Democrat Mike McGuire, and the 2nd Assembly district, represented by Democrat Chris Rogers.

Federally, Hyampom is in California's 2nd congressional district, represented by Democrat Jared Huffman.
