= Weaverville, California =

Weaverville Ho'raqtu (Chimariko)
- Census-designated place
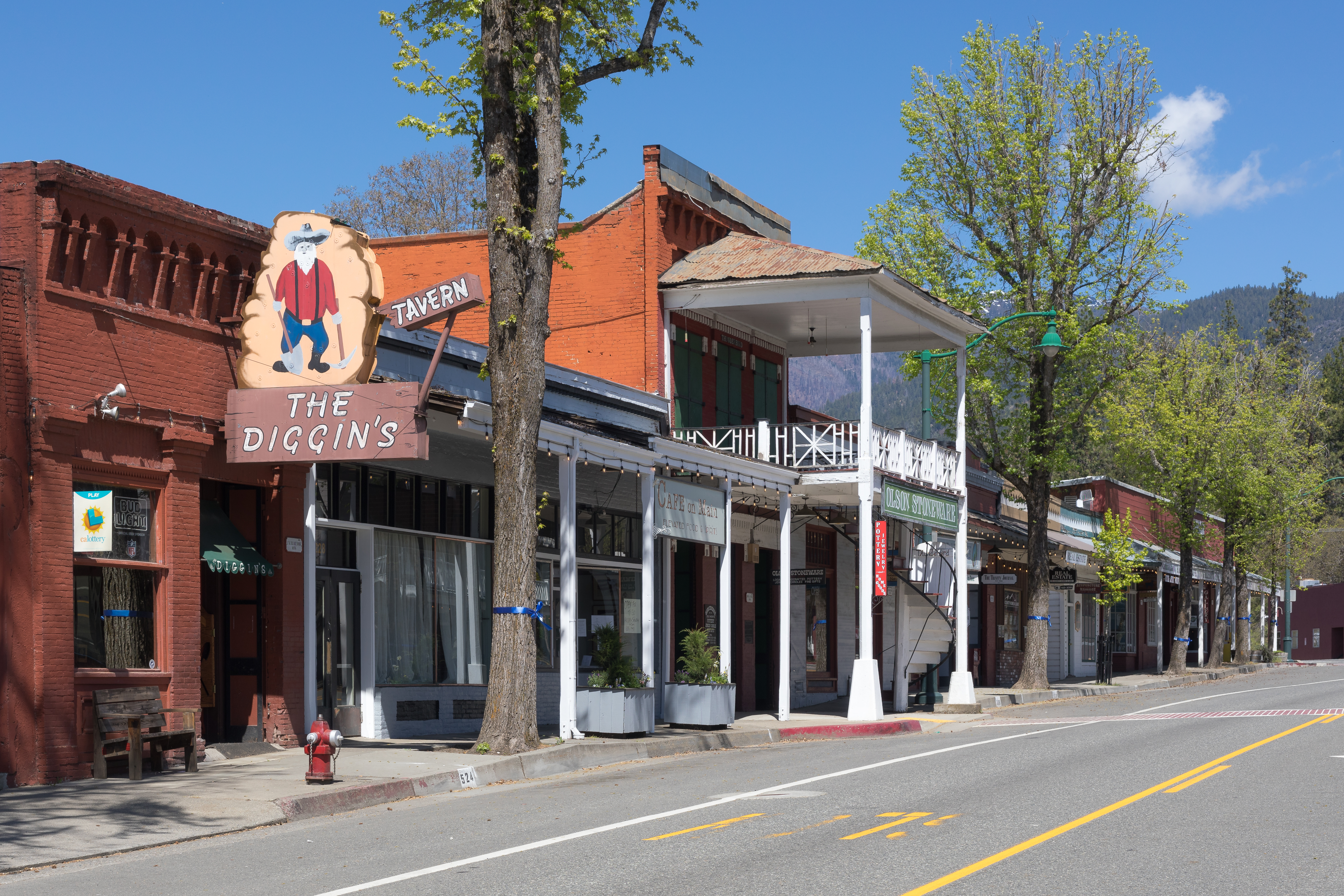
- Main Street in April 2020
- Interactive map of Weaverville
- Location within California Location within the United States
- Coordinates: 40°44′12″N 122°56′10″W
- Country: United States
- State: California
- County: Trinity

Area
  - Total: 12.882 sq mi (33.363 km^{2})
  - Land: 12.882 sq mi (33.363 km^{2})
  - Water: 0 sq mi (0 km^{2}) 0%
- Elevation: 2,051 ft (625 m)

Population (2020)
  - Total: 3,667
  - Density: 284.7/sq mi (109.9/km^{2})
- Time zone: UTC-08:00 (PST)
  - Summer (DST): UTC-07:00 (PDT)
- ZIP code: 96093
- Area code: 530
- FIPS code: 06-83794
- GNIS feature IDs: 1652649, 2409537

Weaverville (Chimariko: Ho'raqtu) is a census-designated place in and the county seat of Trinity County, California, United States. Its population is 3,667 as of the 2020 census, up from 3,600 from the 2010 census.

== History ==
Founded in 1850, Weaverville is a historic California Gold Rush town. Located at the foot of the current Trinity Alps Wilderness Area, Weaverville was once home to approximately 2,000 Chinese gold miners and had its own Chinatown. Many of these miners left once the gold rush ended, and the majority of the Chinatown burned down in a 1911 fire. Historical monuments and architecture throughout the town keep this history alive. The Joss House is California's oldest active Chinese temple, housing Chinese artifacts from the 19th century, and is Weaverville's oldest building, built in 1852.

Logging and tourism were the economic mainstays of Weaverville for many years. Today, Weaverville is known for its trail system and historic downtown. The Trinity Alps Basin Trails system starts in Weaverville and is a network of professionally maintained hiking and biking trails with variety in difficulty in and around the Trinity Alps and its lakes.

Weaverville has notable and unusual original gold rush historical architecture, like its iconic spiral staircases on Main Street, an old bandstand, and red courthouse. The Jake Jackson Museum on Main Street is an original building from the 1850's and displays gold rush equipment, tools, photos and memorabilia. The Diggins Saloon and New York Saloon have been open to customers since the gold rush era.

Trinity Lake (off California State Route 3 just 15 minutes from Weaverville) is a man-made lake providing water to nearby Whiskeytown Lake in neighboring Shasta County, and farmers as far as the Central Valley of California. It became a popular secret recreation area for campers, boaters, and motorcyclists in the 1970s and continues its popularity in non-drought years.

Weaverville has relied on the Trinity Journal as its main source of county news, event calendar, and business advertisements since 1856. It is one of California's oldest newspapers still in print. The office of the Trinity Journal is housed in Weaverville's Historic District. The Trinity Journal publishes weekly on Wednesdays.

Weaverville created its own power company (Trinity PUD) so it could be independent of PG&E and have the ability to create power from local hydro sources.

== Geography and climate ==
Weaverville is located at 40°44′12″N 122°56′10″W (40.736687, -122.936208).

According to the United States Census Bureau, the CDP has a total area of 12.9 square miles (33 km^{2}), all land.

Weaverville has a Mediterranean climate (Köppen Csa, bordering on Csb), though owing to its inland valley location, the town is wetter and observes much larger diurnal temperature variations, creating colder mornings, than considered prototypical for the climate type. The National Weather Service has had a cooperative weather station in Weaverville since 1894. Based on those records, average January temperatures are a maximum of 47.2 °F (8.4 °C) and a minimum of 27.4 °F (−2.6 °C), while July temperatures average a maximum of 94.1 °F (34.5 °C) and a minimum of 49.1 °F (9.5 °C). There are an average of 77.3 afternoons with highs of 90 °F (32 °C) or higher, plus an average of 126.8 mornings with lows of 32 °F (0 °C) or lower, although only two afternoons every three years fail to rise above freezing, and only one morning every three years will fall to 0 °F (−18 °C) or below. The record high temperature was 116 °F (46.7 °C) on August 4, 1932, and the record low temperature was −10 °F (−23.3 °C) on December 9, 1972.

Average annual precipitation is 35.45 inches (900 mm), with an average of 83 days annually with measurable precipitation. The most precipitation in one month was 20.86 inches (530 mm) in December 2005, while the wettest "rain year" was from July 1982 to June 1983 with at least 65.82 inches (1,672 mm) (several days missing) and the driest from July 1990 to June 1991 with 19.02 inches (483 mm) – although the 1976–77 "rain year" with many days in May missing had a recorded total of only 12.73 inches (323 mm). The most precipitation in 24 hours was 5.5 inches (140 mm) on January 4, 1982. Average annual snowfall is 8.7 inches (22 cm). The most snowfall in one month was 75.3 inches (191 cm) in January 1950.

Climate data for Weaverville, California (1991–2020 normals, 1894–2020 extremes)
Month	Jan	Feb	Mar	Apr	May	Jun	Jul	Aug	Sep	Oct	Nov	Dec	Year
Record high °F (°C)	75 (24)	82 (28)	90 (32)	94 (34)	106 (41)	113 (45)	113 (45)	116 (47)	111 (44)	104 (40)	89 (32)	85 (29)	116 (47)
Mean maximum °F (°C)	61.0 (16.1)	69.2 (20.7)	77.4 (25.2)	84.8 (29.3)	93.5 (34.2)	101.0 (38.3)	105.3 (40.7)	104.4 (40.2)	100.6 (38.1)	91.0 (32.8)	72.4 (22.4)	59.1 (15.1)	106.8 (41.6)
Mean daily maximum °F (°C)	48.5 (9.2)	55.3 (12.9)	61.1 (16.2)	67.6 (19.8)	77.1 (25.1)	86.1 (30.1)	95.1 (35.1)	94.5 (34.7)	88.5 (31.4)	74.8 (23.8)	56.3 (13.5)	46.7 (8.2)	71.0 (21.7)
Daily mean °F (°C)	39.8 (4.3)	43.3 (6.3)	47.2 (8.4)	51.8 (11.0)	59.4 (15.2)	66.3 (19.1)	73.7 (23.2)	72.3 (22.4)	66.2 (19.0)	55.6 (13.1)	44.9 (7.2)	38.6 (3.7)	54.9 (12.7)
Mean daily minimum °F (°C)	31.2 (−0.4)	31.2 (−0.4)	33.3 (0.7)	36.1 (2.3)	41.8 (5.4)	46.4 (8.0)	52.2 (11.2)	50.0 (10.0)	43.9 (6.6)	36.4 (2.4)	33.4 (0.8)	30.5 (−0.8)	38.9 (3.8)
Mean minimum °F (°C)	20.3 (−6.5)	20.7 (−6.3)	23.1 (−4.9)	25.7 (−3.5)	31.3 (−0.4)	35.9 (2.2)	43.8 (6.6)	42.6 (5.9)	34.8 (1.6)	27.1 (−2.7)	21.3 (−5.9)	19.0 (−7.2)	14.9 (−9.5)
Record low °F (°C)	−7 (−22)	0 (−18)	12 (−11)	16 (−9)	22 (−6)	28 (−2)	32 (0)	29 (−2)	23 (−5)	14 (−10)	4 (−16)	−10 (−23)	−10 (−23)
Average precipitation inches (mm)	6.68 (170)	5.69 (145)	5.01 (127)	2.62 (67)	1.86 (47)	0.93 (24)	0.27 (6.9)	0.17 (4.3)	0.31 (7.9)	2.00 (51)	4.33 (110)	7.67 (195)	37.54 (954)
Average snowfall inches (cm)	2.6 (6.6)	1.3 (3.3)	0.3 (0.76)	0.2 (0.51)	0.0 (0.0)	0.0 (0.0)	0.0 (0.0)	0.0 (0.0)	0.0 (0.0)	0.0 (0.0)	0.8 (2.0)	4.0 (10)	9.2 (23.17)
Average precipitation days (≥ 0.01 in)	15.7	13.6	14.1	10.6	7.2	3.6	1.2	1.2	2.0	5.9	12.8	17.1	105
Average snowy days (≥ 0.1 in)	1.4	1.2	0.5	0.3	0.0	0.0	0.0	0.0	0.0	0.0	0.5	1.5	5.4
Source 1: NOAA
Source 2: National Weather Service

== Demographics ==
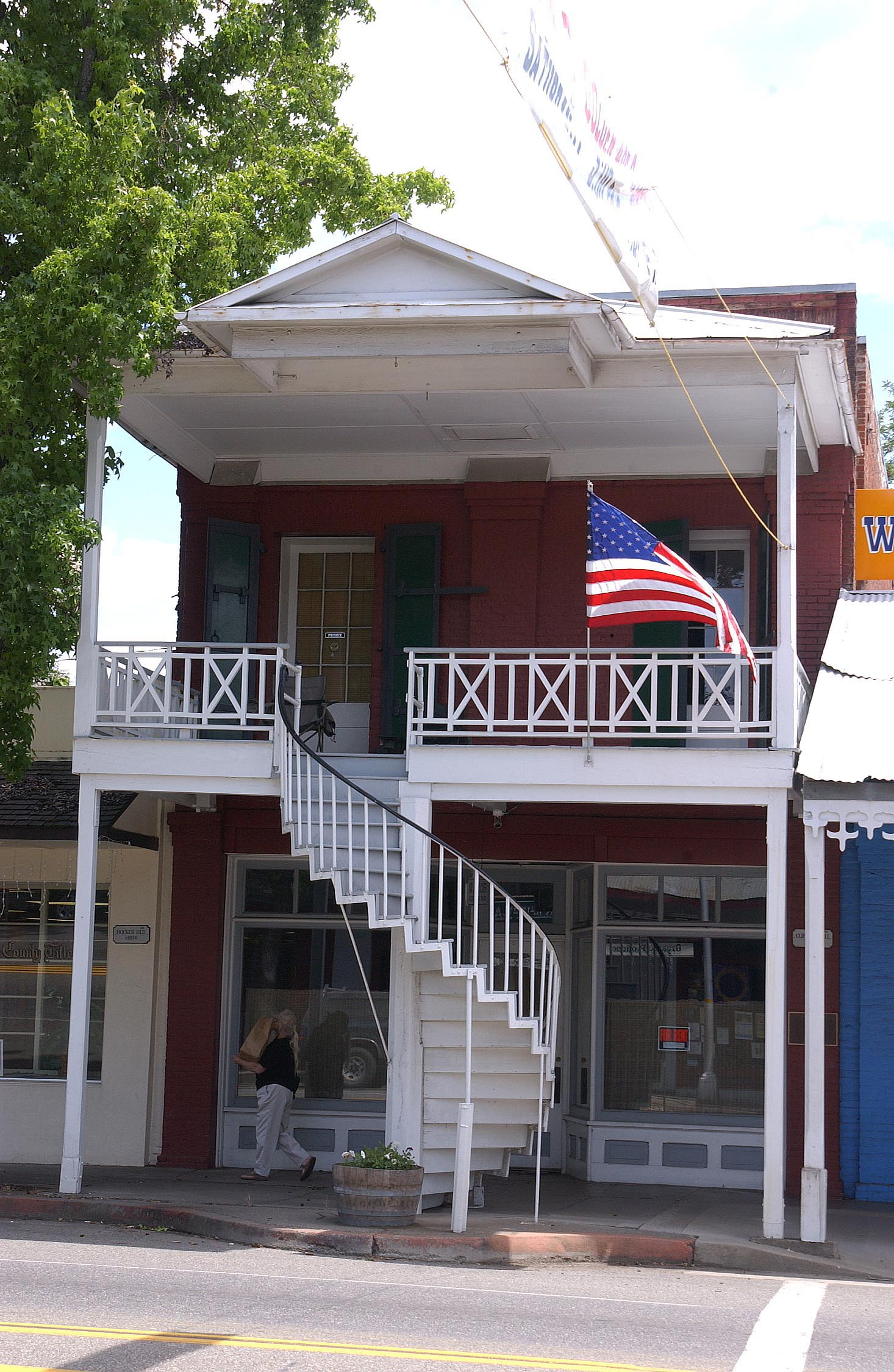
One of many spiral staircases in Weaverville

=== Population ===
Historical population
Census	Pop.	Note	%±
1860	777		—
1870	816		5.0%
1960	1,736		—
1970	1,489		−14.2%
1980	2,787		87.2%
1990	3,370		20.9%
2000	3,554		5.5%
2010	3,600		1.3%
2020	3,667		1.9%
U.S. Decennial Census; 1850–1870 1880–1890; 1900 1910 1920; 1930 1940 1950; 1960 1970 1980; 1990 2000 2010

=== 2020 census ===
As of the 2020 census, Weaverville had a population of 3,667. The population density was 284.7 inhabitants per square mile (109.9/km^{2}). The median age was 44.1 years. The age distribution was 21.8% under the age of 18, 5.5% aged 18 to 24, 24.4% aged 25 to 44, 25.9% aged 45 to 64, and 22.4% who were 65 years of age or older. For every 100 females, there were 98.9 males, and for every 100 females age 18 and over there were 99.6 males age 18 and over.

Racial composition as of the 2020 census
Race	Number	Percent
White	2,983	81.3%
Black or African American	22	0.6%
American Indian and Alaska Native	119	3.2%
Asian	65	1.8%
Native Hawaiian and Other Pacific Islander	8	0.2%
Some other race	87	2.4%
Two or more races	383	10.4%
Hispanic or Latino (of any race)	262	7.1%

The census reported that 96.9% of the population lived in households, 1.9% lived in non-institutionalized group quarters, and 1.2% were institutionalized. In addition, 0.0% of residents lived in urban areas and 100.0% lived in rural areas.

There were 1,532 households, out of which 27.3% included children under the age of 18, 40.1% were married-couple households, 8.5% were cohabiting couple households, 29.2% had a female householder with no spouse or partner present, and 22.1% had a male householder with no spouse or partner present. 31.0% of households were one person, and 15.6% had someone living alone who was 65 years of age or older. The average household size was 2.32. There were 926 families (60.4% of all households).

There were 1,659 housing units at an average density of 128.8 units per square mile (49.7 units/km^{2}), of which 1,532 (92.3%) were occupied. Of these, 61.2% were owner-occupied and 38.8% were occupied by renters. The homeowner vacancy rate was 0.9%, and the rental vacancy rate was 6.6%.

=== 2010 census ===
At the 2010 census Weaverville had a population of 3,600. The population density was 345.4 inhabitants per square mile (133.4/km^{2}). The racial makeup of Weaverville was 3,162 (87.8%) White, 11 (0.3%) African American, 152 (4.2%) Native American, 41 (1.1%) Asian, 1 (0.0%) Pacific Islander, 38 (1.1%) from other races, and 195 (5.4%) from two or more races. Hispanic or Latino of any race were 255 people (7.1%).

The census reported that 3,473 people (96.5% of the population) lived in households, 61 (1.7%) lived in non-institutionalized group quarters, and 66 (1.8%) were institutionalized.

There were 1,513 households, 440 (29.1%) had children under the age of 18 living in them, 622 (41.1%) were married couples living together, 185 (12.2%) had a female householder with no husband present, 112 (7.4%) had a male householder with no wife present. There were 145 (9.6%) unmarried opposite-sex partnerships, and 12 (0.8%) same-sex married couples or partnerships. 473 households (31.3%) were one person and 196 (13.0%) had someone living alone who was 65 or older. The average household size was 2.30. There were 919 families (60.7% of households); the average family size was 2.80.

The age distribution was 842 people (23.4%) under the age of 18, 247 people (6.9%) aged 18 to 24, 734 people (20.4%) aged 25 to 44, 1,109 people (30.8%) aged 45 to 64, and 668 people (18.6%) who were 65 or older. The median age was 44.4 years. For every 100 females, there were 94.5 males. For every 100 females age 18 and over, there were 91.4 males.

There were 1,675 housing units at an average density of 160.7 per square mile, of the occupied units 908 (60.0%) were owner-occupied and 605 (40.0%) were rented. The homeowner vacancy rate was 2.8%; the rental vacancy rate was 6.8%. 2,089 people (58.0% of the population) lived in owner-occupied housing units and 1,384 people (38.4%) lived in rental housing units.

== Transportation ==
=== Major highways ===
- State Route 299. SR 299 runs through the middle of Weaverville as Main Street, intersecting downtown with SR 3 (Trinity Lake Boulevard). The part of SR 299 between Arcata and Redding is the Trinity Scenic Byway, a National Forest Scenic Byway.

== Government ==
In the California State Legislature, Weaverville is in the 2nd senatorial district, represented by Democrat Mike McGuire, and in the 2nd Assembly district, represented by Democrat Chris Rogers.

In the United States House of Representatives, Weaverville is in California's 2nd congressional district, represented by Democrat Jared Huffman.

== Sites of interest ==
Name	Image	Date listed	Location	Description
Weaverville Joss House State Historic Park		Added to California Historical markers in 1956	Southwest corner of Main Street	"The Temple of the Forest Beneath the Clouds"), a Taoist temple, was built in 1874 and is California's best-preserved example of a Gold Rush-era Chinese place of worship.
Racetrack-Airport-GolfCourse Historical Marker		Marker erected in 2007	Located at current site of the Trinity County Golf Course.	Historical Marker for the site of former racetrack and airport
Weaverville Historic District		Added to NHRP 1971	Located on both sides of Main Street	11 acres (4.5 ha) consisting of 25 historical buildings

== In popular culture ==
- The 1938 Warner Brothers Technicolor film Gold Is Where You Find It was filmed in and around Weaverville.
- The 1975 Mary McCaslin song "The Ballad of Weaverville" gives a fictional account of the town's namesake being a gambler, Jim Weaver, who had the town named after him as his final bet, after winning all of the town's gold.
- Road Trip Episode 154 with Huell Howser
- Weaverville is the setting for the fifteenth episode of the twenty fifth season of Intervention (TV series).
