= Hayfork, California =

Hayfork
- census-designated place
- Location in Trinity County and the state of California

- Location in the United States
- Coordinates: 40°34′17″N 123°8′48″W
- Country: United States
- State: California
- County: Trinity

Area
  - Total: 72.167 sq mi (186.912 km^{2})
  - Land: 72.145 sq mi (186.854 km^{2})
  - Water: 0.022 sq mi (0.058 km^{2}) 0.03%
- Elevation: 2,310 ft (704 m)

Population (2020)
  - Total: 2,324
  - Density: 32.21/sq mi (12.44/km^{2})
- Time zone: UTC-8 (Pacific (PST))
  - Summer (DST): UTC-7 (PDT)
- ZIP code: 96041
- Area code: 530
- FIPS code: 06-32562
- GNIS feature ID: 0277529

Hayfork is a census-designated place (CDP) in Trinity County, California, United States. Its population is 2,324 as of the 2020 census, down from 2,368 from the 2010 census.

== Namesake ==
Hayfork was originally named Nor'el pom, a Wintu name meaning "big valley at base of the mountain". It was subsequently named Kingbury, then Haytown, and finally Hayfork after the nearby creek.

== History ==
In 1921 the first Trinity County Fair was held with the Governor at the time William Stephens

== Geography ==
Hayfork is located at 40°34′17″N 123°8′48″W (40.571406, -123.146619) at an elevation of 2310 feet.

According to the United States Census Bureau, the CDP has a total area of 72.2 square miles (187 km^{2}), of which 72.1 square miles (187 km^{2}) is land and 0.02 square miles (0.052 km^{2}) (0.03%) is water.

=== Climate ===
According to the Köppen Climate Classification system, Hayfork has a warm-summer Mediterranean climate, abbreviated Csb on climate maps. Hayfork experiences extreme diurnal temperature variation in summer, while in winter the diurnals are wide enough to cause significant air frosts during night.

Atypical for an area with such hot summertime temperatures and mild winters, frost usually occurs from mid-September to early June, and frosts throughout the summer are not unheard of. There are an average of 69.8 afternoons with a high over 90 °F or 32.2 °C, and 155 mornings that fall below 32 °F or 0 °C, including 1.7 mornings in June. On average, once every 10 years there will be a frost in July and three out of 10 years there will be one in August. Three times every ten years, the temperature drops below 0 °F or −17.8 °C, while daily maxima below 32 °F or 0 °C occur at an approximately identical frequency. The town sees a mean of 2370.5 growing degree days, with a base temperature of 50 °F or 10 °C. Despite the USDA zone map showing the town in zone 8, NOAA records show that the town is actually in zone 7b, with the average coldest temperature experienced in a year being 6.8 °F (−14.0 °C). The average hottest temperature in a year is 107.4 °F (41.9 °C). The record low high temperature is 30 °F (−1.1 °C) on January 2 and December 18 of 1924, and the record high low temperature is 64 °F (17.8 °C) on reached five times: July 19 in 2006, July 22 in 2002, July 26 in 1996, and August 2 and 3 in 2003.

There are 80 days with precipitation of over 0.01 inches, 54 over 0.1 inches, 23 over 0.5 inches, and 9 over an inch. The record high monthly snowfall is 77.7 inches or 2.0 metres in January 1916, and traces of snowfall have been seen as late as June 15 in 1950 and as early as October 21 in 1961. Precipitation falls mostly as rain below 3,300 feet (1,000 m) and mostly as snow above that level, whereas Hayfork is at 2,323 feet (708 m) above sea level. The wettest "rain year" (July 1 to June 30) was 1982–1983, with 72.69 inches (1,846.3 mm) of precipitation, and the driest was 1976–1977 with 14.43 inches (366.5 mm).

Climate data for Hayfork, California
Month	Jan	Feb	Mar	Apr	May	Jun	Jul	Aug	Sep	Oct	Nov	Dec	Year
Record high °F (°C)	71 (22)	81 (27)	90 (32)	95 (35)	101 (38)	109 (43)	109 (43)	111 (44)	107 (42)	100 (38)	97 (36)	71 (22)	111 (44)
Mean daily maximum °F (°C)	49.9 (9.9)	54.0 (12.2)	59.6 (15.3)	66.0 (18.9)	75.0 (23.9)	84.7 (29.3)	94.1 (34.5)	94.6 (34.8)	86.9 (30.5)	73.7 (23.2)	57.5 (14.2)	48.6 (9.2)	70.4 (21.3)
Mean daily minimum °F (°C)	27.5 (−2.5)	27.9 (−2.3)	30.7 (−0.7)	33.5 (0.8)	38.6 (3.7)	43.0 (6.1)	48.9 (9.4)	47.2 (8.4)	39.8 (4.3)	33.8 (1.0)	31.7 (−0.2)	27.7 (−2.4)	35.9 (2.1)
Record low °F (°C)	−2 (−19)	−2 (−19)	12 (−11)	11 (−12)	20 (−7)	5 (−15)	32 (0)	31 (−1)	23 (−5)	13 (−11)	8 (−13)	−4 (−20)	−4 (−20)
Average precipitation inches (mm)	6.18 (157)	5.05 (128)	3.74 (95)	1.84 (47)	1.17 (30)	0.61 (15)	0.20 (5.1)	0.27 (6.9)	0.68 (17)	2.06 (52)	4.84 (123)	6.69 (170)	33.3 (850)
Average snowfall inches (cm)	6.5 (17)	2.9 (7.4)	2.1 (5.3)	0.6 (1.5)	0 (0)	0 (0)	0 (0)	0 (0)	0 (0)	0 (0)	1 (2.5)	4.5 (11)	17.6 (44.7)
Source: Western Regional Climate Center

== Points of Interest ==
- Japanese Bomb Balloon Marker. Erected in 1978, mentions the Japanese Bomb Balloon that exploded near Hayfork in World War II.
- Bridge Gulch Massacre
- Hayfork Creek
- Wildwood (unincorporated community)
- Peanut (unincorporated community)

== Demographics ==
=== Population ===
Historical population
Census	Pop.	Note	%±
1990	2,549		—
2000	2,315		−9.2%
2010	2,368		2.3%
2020	2,324		−1.9%
U.S. Decennial Census; 1790-1960 1900-1990; 1990-2000 2010-2015

=== 2020 census ===
As of the 2020 census, Hayfork had a population of 2,324 and a population density of 32.2 inhabitants per square mile (12.4/km^{2}). The median age was 43.9 years. The age distribution was 19.0% under the age of 18, 5.8% aged 18 to 24, 26.6% aged 25 to 44, 27.2% aged 45 to 64, and 21.4% who were 65 years of age or older. For every 100 females there were 123.9 males, and for every 100 females age 18 and over there were 124.9 males age 18 and over.

The census reported that 99.5% of the population lived in households, 11 people (0.5%) lived in non-institutionalized group quarters, and no one was institutionalized. Of residents, 0.0% lived in urban areas and 100.0% lived in rural areas.

There were 943 households, of which 22.4% had children under the age of 18 living in them. Of all households, 38.6% were married-couple households, 30.1% were households with a male householder and no spouse or partner present, and 22.1% were households with a female householder and no spouse or partner present. About 32.4% of all households were made up of individuals and 15.7% had someone living alone who was 65 years of age or older. The average household size was 2.45, and there were 532 families (56.4% of all households).

There were 1,064 housing units at an average density of 14.7 units per square mile (5.7 units/km^{2}), of which 943 (88.6%) were occupied. Of occupied units, 67.0% were owner-occupied and 33.0% were occupied by renters. The homeowner vacancy rate was 0.6% and the rental vacancy rate was 1.6%.

Racial composition as of the 2020 census
Race	Number	Percent
White	1,747	75.2%
Black or African American	7	0.3%
American Indian and Alaska Native	92	4.0%
Asian	237	10.2%
Native Hawaiian and Other Pacific Islander	4	0.2%
Some other race	50	2.2%
Two or more races	187	8.0%
Hispanic or Latino (of any race)	151	6.5%

=== Income and poverty ===
In 2023, the US Census Bureau estimated that the median household income was $45,918, and the per capita income was $26,816.

=== 2010 census ===
At the 2010 census Hayfork had a population of 2,368. The population density was 32.8 inhabitants per square mile (12.7/km^{2}). The racial makeup of Hayfork was 1,999 (84.4%) White, 4 (0.2%) African American, 162 (6.8%) Native American, 8 (0.3%) Asian, 2 (0.1%) Pacific Islander, 38 (1.6%) from other races, and 155 (6.5%) from two or more races. Hispanic or Latino of any race were 189 people (8.0%).

The census reported that 2,326 people (98.2% of the population) lived in households, 42 (1.8%) lived in non-institutionalized group quarters, and no one was institutionalized.

There were 1,024 households, 247 (24.1%) had children under the age of 18 living in them, 424 (41.4%) were opposite-sex married couples living together, 107 (10.4%) had a female householder with no husband present, 62 (6.1%) had a male householder with no wife present. There were 109 (10.6%) unmarried opposite-sex partnerships, and 4 (0.4%) same-sex married couples or partnerships. 336 households (32.8%) were one person and 137 (13.4%) had someone living alone who was 65 or older. The average household size was 2.27. There were 593 families (57.9% of households); the average family size was 2.84.

The age distribution was 471 people (19.9%) under the age of 18, 160 people (6.8%) aged 18 to 24, 483 people (20.4%) aged 25 to 44, 810 people (34.2%) aged 45 to 64, and 444 people (18.8%) who were 65 or older. The median age was 46.9 years. For every 100 females, there were 103.8 males. For every 100 females age 18 and over, there were 109.6 males.

There were 1,213 housing units at an average density of 16.8 per square mile, of the occupied units 663 (64.7%) were owner-occupied and 361 (35.3%) were rented. The homeowner vacancy rate was 1.3%; the rental vacancy rate was 3.2%. 1,498 people (63.3% of the population) lived in owner-occupied housing units and 828 people (35.0%) lived in rental housing units.

== School System ==
Mountain Valley Unified School District (MVUSD) is a collection of six schools located in the Hayfork area, they are as follows. Hayfork High School, Hayfork Elementary School, Valley High School, Community Day School, Hyampom Arts Magnet School, and Adult Education School.

== Politics ==
In the state legislature, Hayfork is in the 2nd senatorial district, represented by Democrat Mike McGuire, and the 2nd Assembly district, represented by Democrat Chris Rogers.

Federally, Hayfork is in California's 2nd congressional district, represented by Democrat Jared Huffman.

== See also ==
- Trinity County, California
