= Johnson Park (disambiguation) =

Johnson Park may refer to:

- Johnson Park in Victoria, Australia
- Johnson Park, Yeovil, Somerset, England
- Johnson Park, California, a census-designated place
- Johnson Park (New Jersey), Piscataway
- Johnson Park in La Belle, Missouri

== See also ==
- Cooper Library in Johnson Park, Camden, New Jersey
