= Little River (Humboldt County) =

River in California, United States

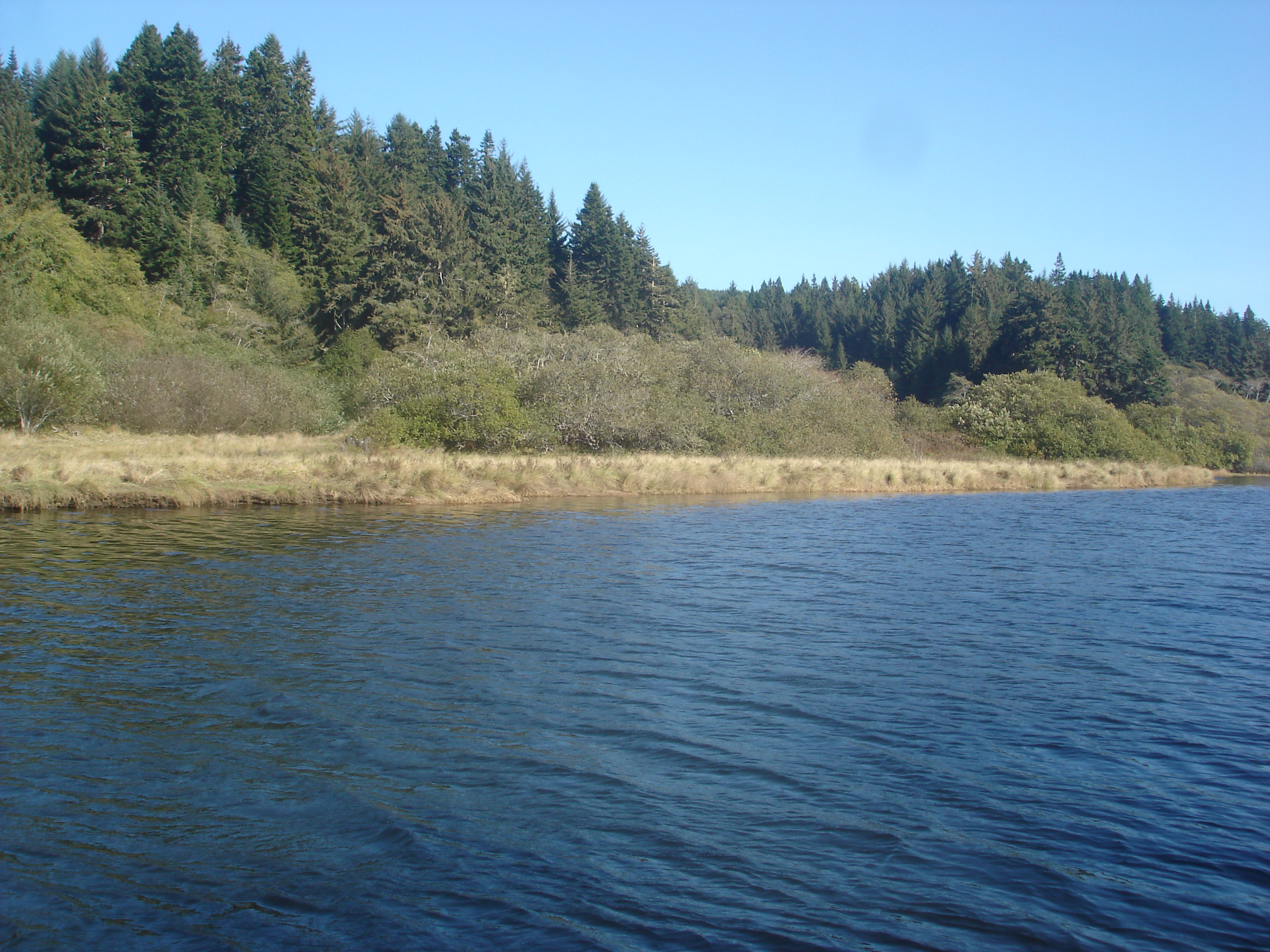
- Little River Estuary upstream of Highway 101

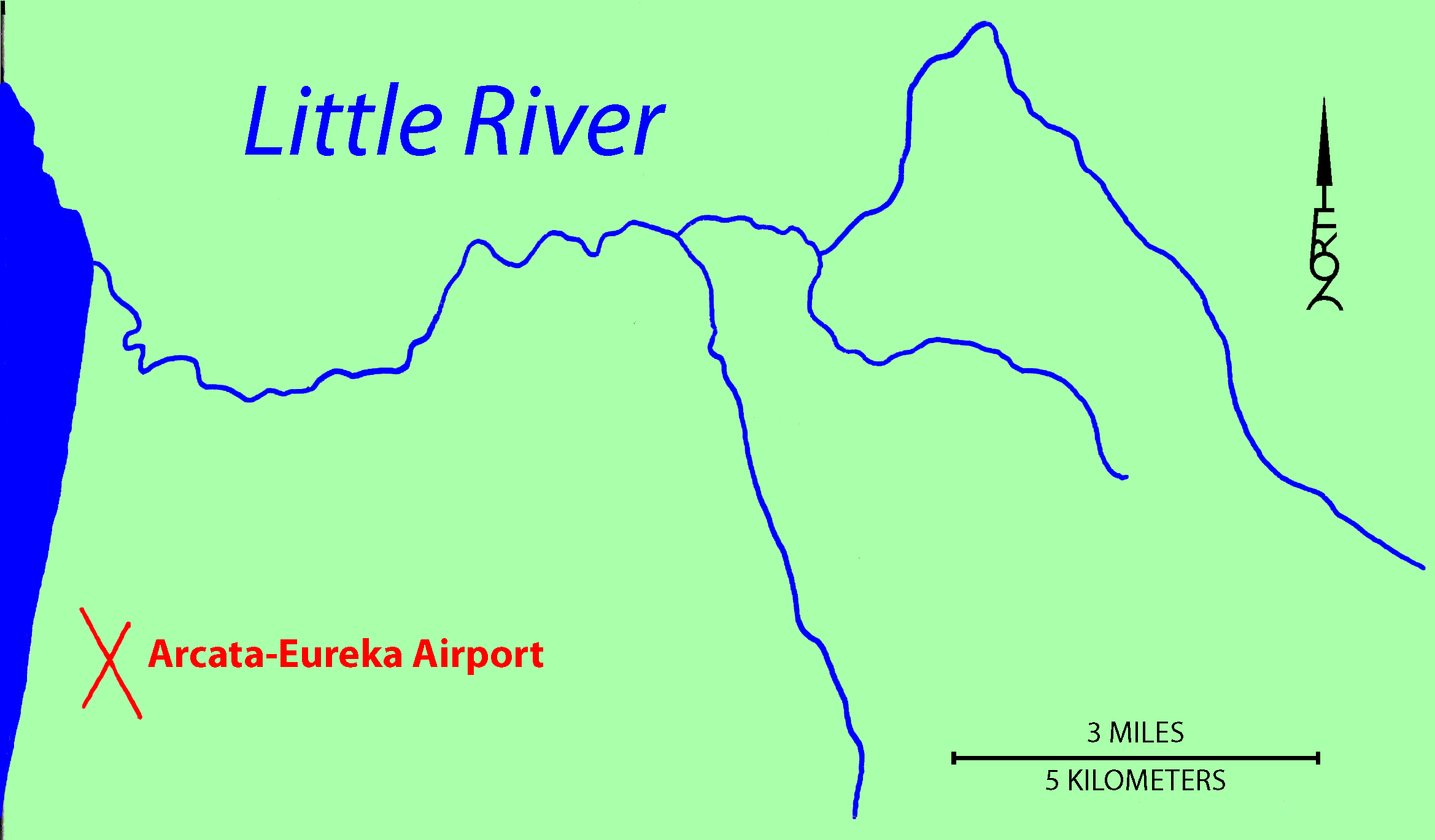
- Map of the Little River region

Location
- Country: United States
- State: California
- Region: Humboldt County

Physical characteristics
- Source
  - coordinates: 40°58′51″N 123°53′41″W
- Mouth: Pacific Ocean
  - coordinates: 41°01′37″N 124°06′40″W
  - elevation: 0 ft (0 m)

The Little River is a river in the U.S. state of California, whose drainage basin is the largest on the Pacific coast between the Mad River and Big Lagoon. The 19.6-mile (31.5 km) river drains the forested Franciscan assemblage of the California Coast Ranges.

The lowermost mile of channel is through Quaternary alluvium and dune sand of an estuarine floodplain typical of coastal inlets along the Cascadia subduction zone. Land seaward of U.S. Route 101 forms Little River State Beach and Clam Beach County Park. Little River State Park was established in 1931. The floodplain upstream of the Highway 101 bridge is cleared as grazing pasture, and the upland portion of the drainage basin, including the former company town of Crannell, is in private ownership growing forest products.

== See also ==
- List of rivers in California
