= Monument Fire =

2021 wildfire in Northern California

- Part of the 2021 California wildfires
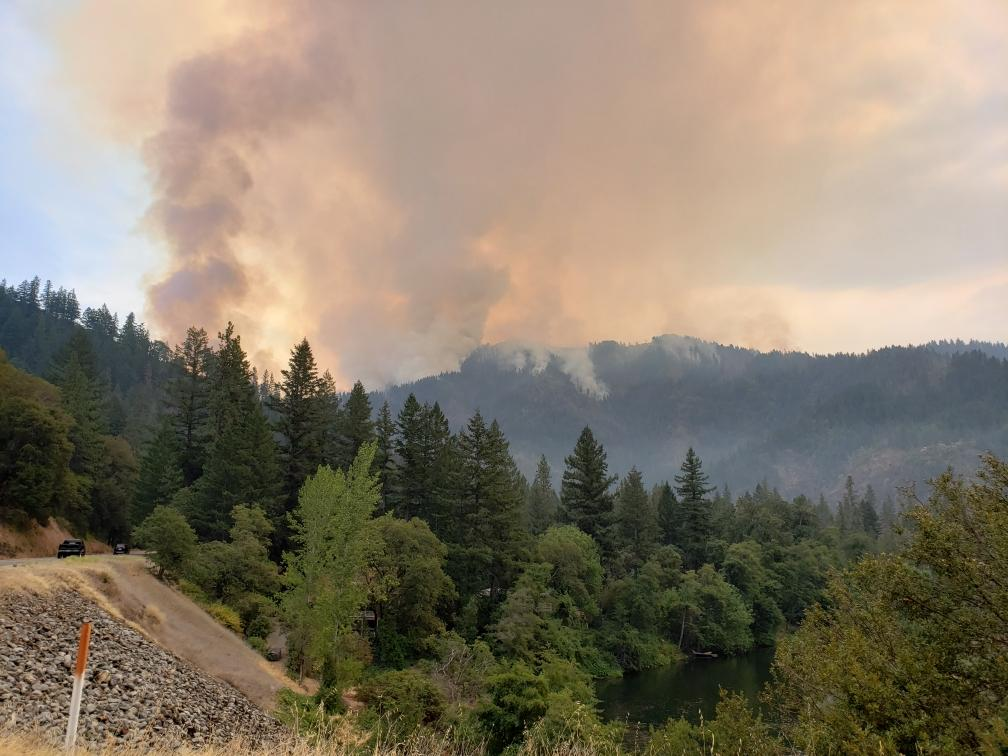
- The Monument Fire on August 1, 2021
- Date: July 30, 2021 –; October 26, 2021
- Location: Big Bar, Shasta-Trinity National Forest, Trinity County, California, United States
- Coordinates: 40.752°N 123.337°W

Statistics
- Burned area: 223,124 acres (90,295 ha)

Impacts
- Structures destroyed: 3 homes 1 commercial

Ignition
- Cause: Lightning strike

Map
- Location in California

The Monument Fire (formerly known as the Panther Fire) was a wildfire west of Big Bar in Shasta-Trinity National Forest, Trinity County, California in the United States. The fire, which was started by a lightning strike, was first reported on July 30, 2021. The communities of Big Bar, Big Flat, Del Loma, and Cedar Flat were evacuated, and Highway 299 was closed in the area. The fire destroyed four structures, including three homes. By the evening of October 27, the fire had burned 223,124 acres (90,295 ha) and was fully contained, and is the 15th largest fire in modern California history.

== Progression ==
=== July ===
The Monument Fire was first reported burning west of Big Bar in Shasta-Trinity National Forest around 6:00 PM on July 30, 2021. The cause of the fire was a lightning strike. The fire was first called the Panther Fire. Its name was changed by August 1 to the Monument Fire.

=== August ===
By August 1, the fire had burned over 1,000 acres (405 ha). Evacuation warnings were put in place for Del Loma and Big Bar and a portion of Highway 299 was closed three hours due to the fire's growth.

The Monument Fire began burning in the fire scar of the 2008 Cedar Fire on August 2. Mandatory evacuations were put in place for Big Bar, Del Loma, and Cedar Flat on August 2. Warnings were also put in place for Burnt Ranch. An evacuation center as opened in Weaverville and Willow Creek, California. Overnight into August 4, four spot fires were established on the north side of the Trinity River and Highway 299. A rock slide blocked parts of Highway 299 near Snyder Bar. This caused a delay in resources accessing the west side of the fire. Phone and internet was also reported out in Big Bar. Power lines were de-energized by PG&E for Big Bar on the morning of August 5 due to concerns about the fire's proximity to power infrastructure. Big Bar was finally placed under mandatory evacuation in the early evening. Additional evacuation warnings were also put in place for Helena, Junction City, Coopers Bar, Red Hill and Canyon Creek. In addition to burning in the Cedar Fire scar, the Monument Fire began burning in the scars of the 2012 Flat Fire and the 2015 River Complex. By August 7, it was confirmed that at least four structures had burned in Big Flat, specifically one commercial and three homes. That same day, the North Coast Unified Air Quality Management District announced an air quality smoke advisory for Weaverville, describing the air quality as "hazardous" and "worse than anticipated."

=== October ===
The Monument Fire was declared 100% contained on October 26, 2021. There were no fatalities in this fire, but eight firefighters were reported to be injured. While 10,580 structures were at risk, only 28 structures were destroyed and two structures damaged.

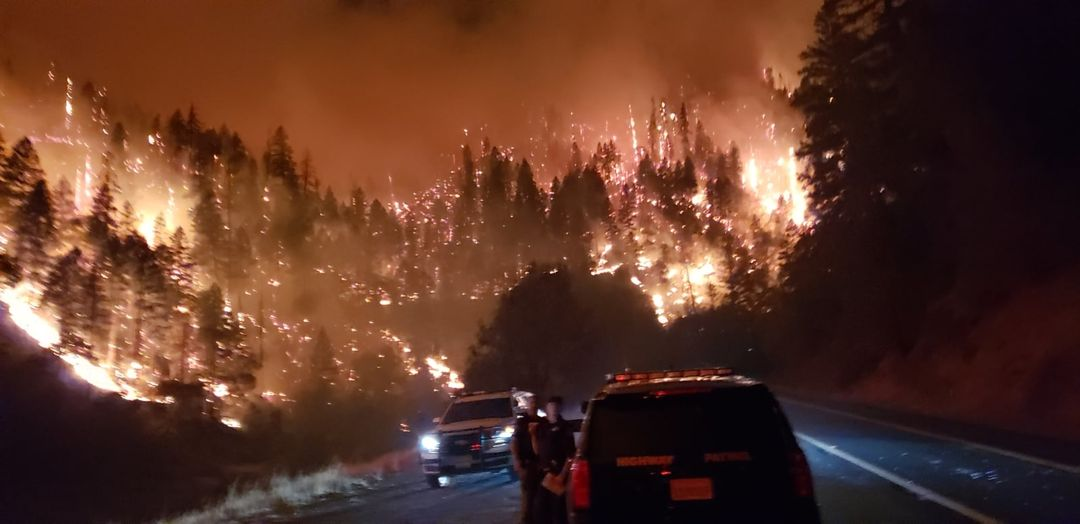
The Monument Fire burning along Highway 299 near Big Bar, which was evacuated on August 2.

== Effects ==
=== Recreation ===
The Monument Fire, like many fires in the area during the 2021 fire season, has impacted recreational activities and tourism in the area. Rafting activities were halted by many companies in the area due to fire concerns and smoke. Additionally, the Forest Service closed a portion of Shasta-Trinity National Forest through October 31, 2021, due to the fire.

=== Infrastructure ===
In Big Flat, one business and three homes were destroyed by the fire.

The fire impacted phone and internet access in the Big Bar area, disconnecting both, starting August 4. Power lines were de-energized in Big Bar on August 5 due to the fire's proximity to PG&E infrastructure.

=== Environment ===
Air quality throughout Northern California was impacted by the Monument Fire, both in the local fire area, and as far as San Francisco. On August 7, an air quality advisory was put in place for Weaverville, California, due to hazardous air quality. The air quality index was reported as 301 or higher in the community. Smoke from the Monument Fire impacted air quality in the Sacramento Valley and San Francisco Bay Area.

== Gallery ==
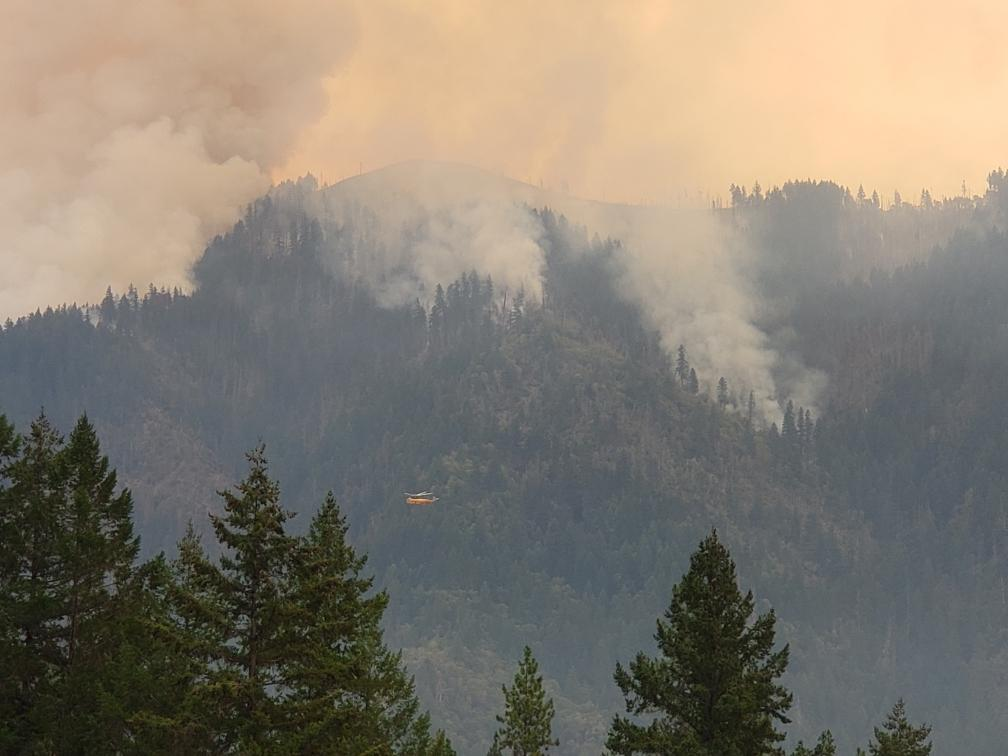
The Monument Fire on August 1, 2021.

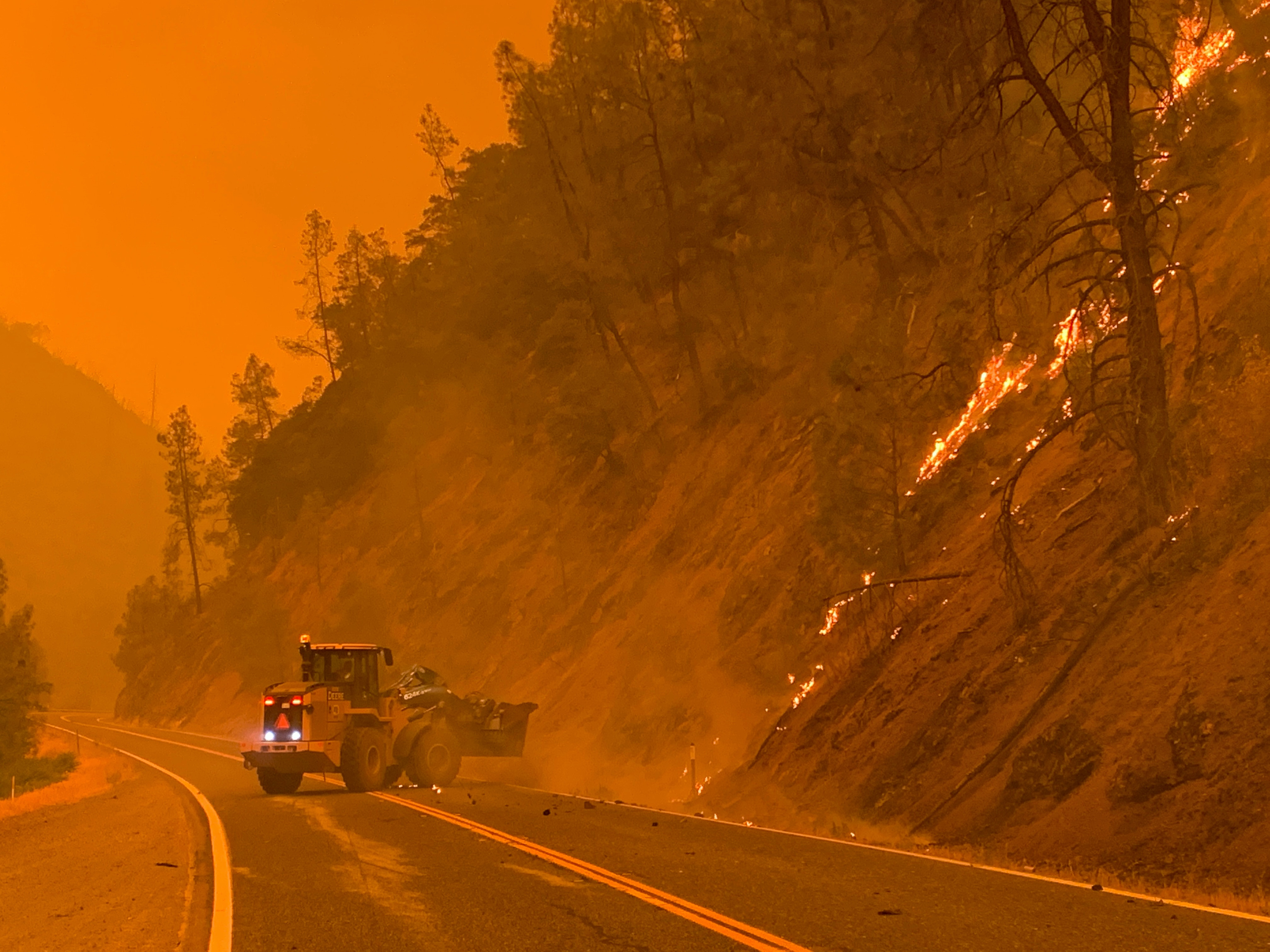
Caltrans crew working along Highway 299 on August 4, 2021.

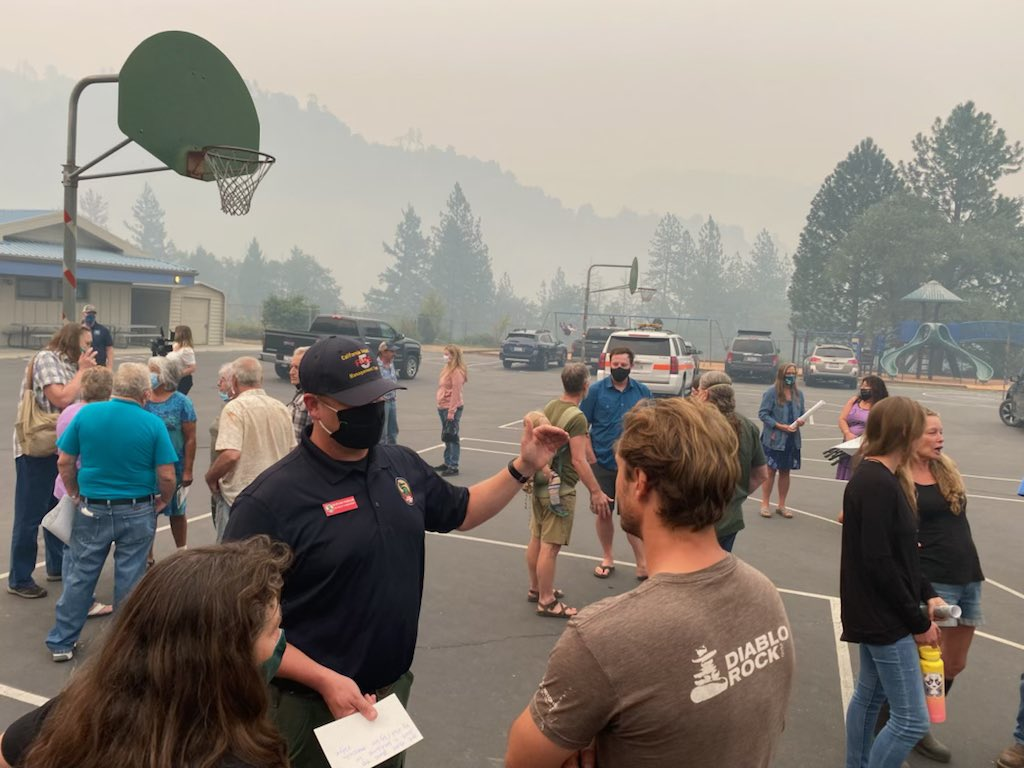
A firefighter participates in a community meeting in Hayfork on August 5, 2021.

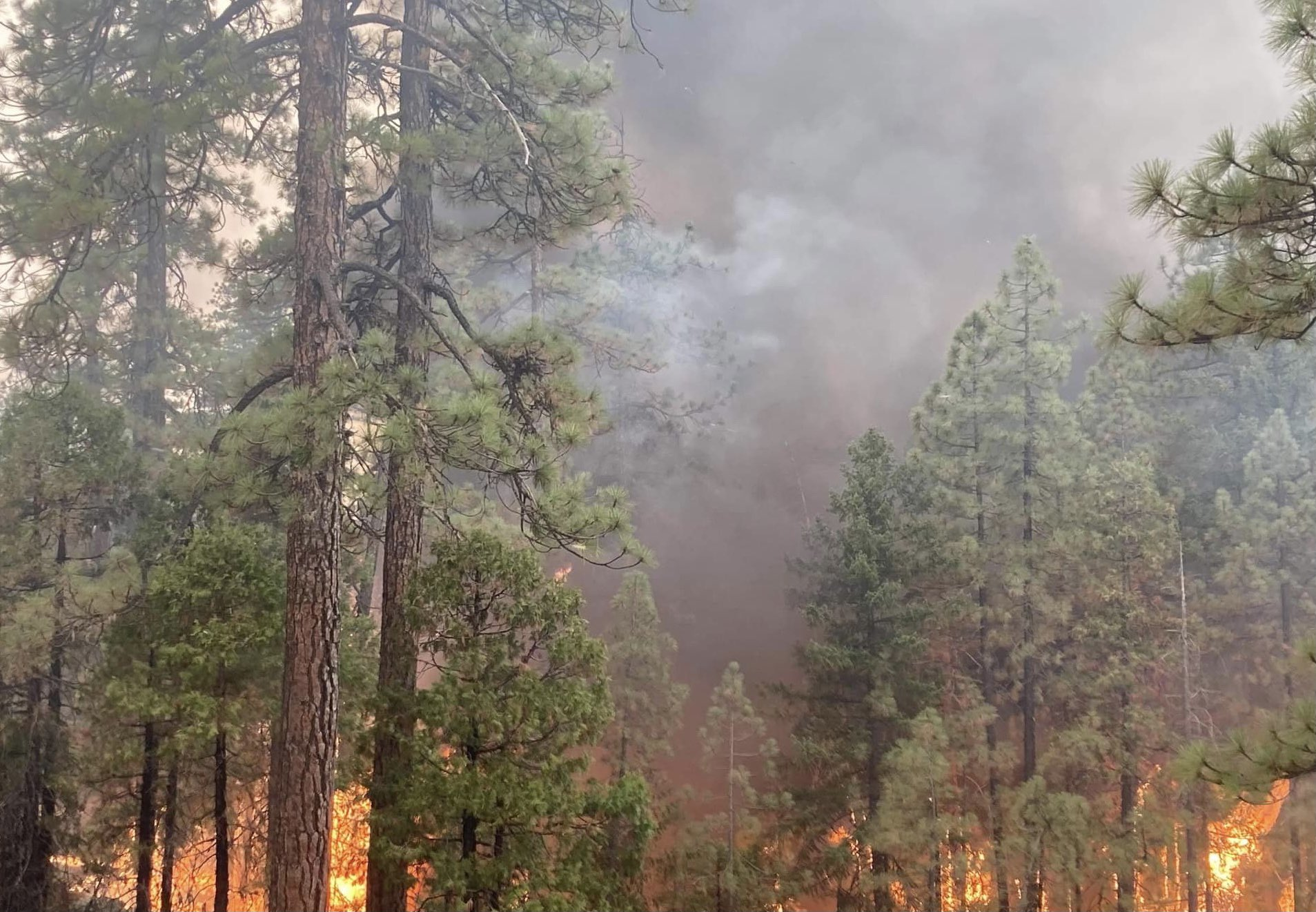
The fire burning on August 6, 2021.

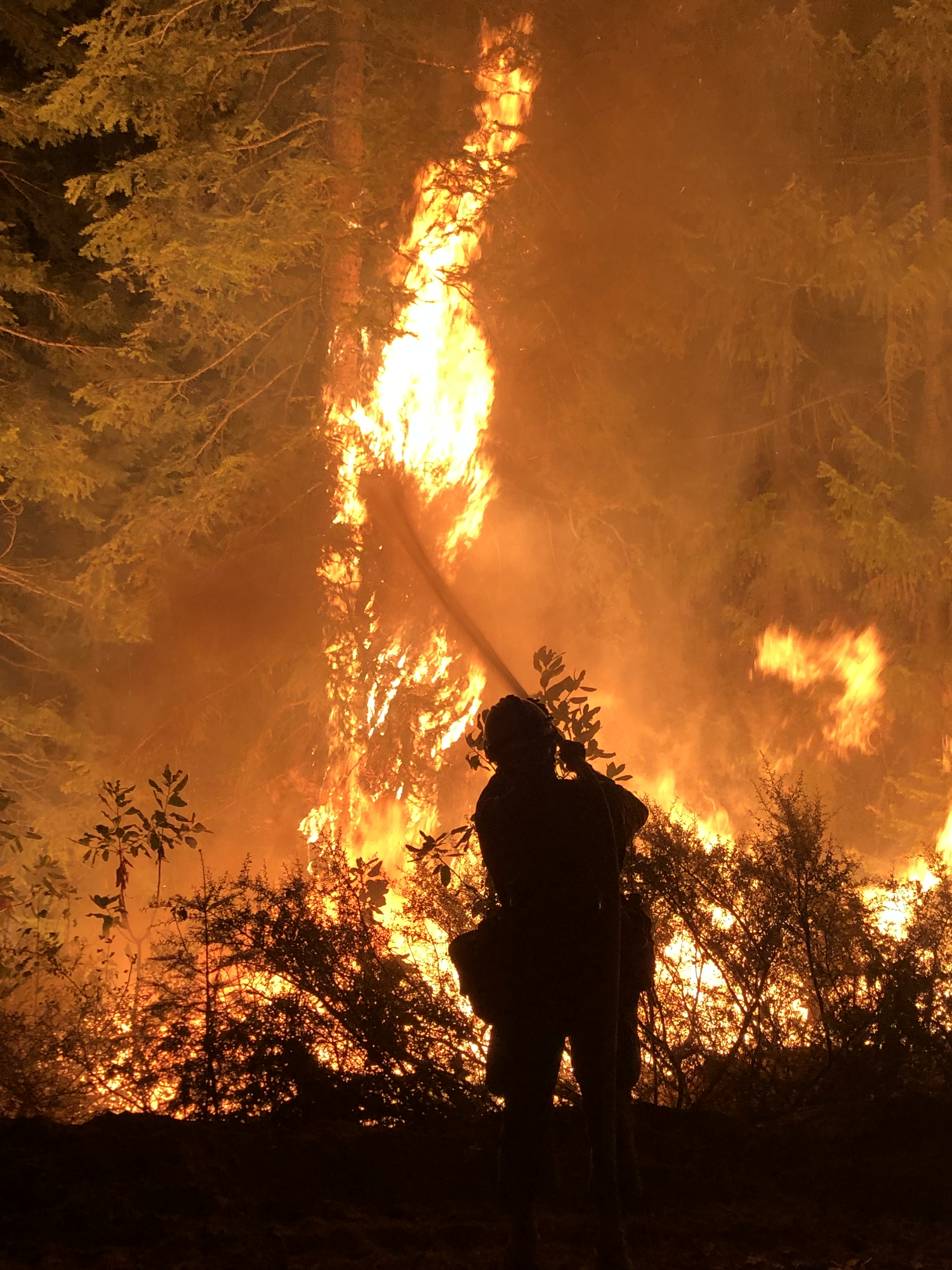
A member of the Ventana Hotshots works to keep fire from a backfiring operation out of the tree canopy on August 18, 2021.
