= California State Route 200 =

State highway in Humboldt County, California, United States

State Route 200

- Map of Humboldt County in northwestern California with SR 200 highlighted in red

Route information
- Maintained by Caltrans
- Length: 2.681 mi (4.315 km)

Major junctions
- West end: US 101 near McKinleyville
- East end: SR 299 near Blue Lake

Location
- Country: United States
- State: California
- Counties: Humboldt

Highway system
- State highways in California; Interstate; US; State; Scenic; History; Pre‑1964; Unconstructed; Deleted; Freeways
← US 199	→ SR 201

State Route 200 (SR 200) is a state highway in the U.S. state of California near Arcata in Humboldt County. It is a cut-off connecting U.S. Route 101 and State Route 299. It runs along the north bank of the Mad River, to the north of the 101-299 junction. It is also known as North Bank Road.

== Route description ==
Route 200 is defined in section 500 of the California Streets and Highways Code, and that the highway is "from Route 101 to Route 299 staying north of the Mad River".

SR 200 begins at an interchange with U.S. Route 101 just north of Arcata, where the entrance to US 101 and exit from the freeway are slightly separated. The road then heads eastward through a forested area in the Azalea State Reserve just north of the Mad River. The road continues to parallel the river with various roads branching off it until it reaches its eastern terminus at State Route 299, the Trinity Scenic Byway, with an interchange.

SR 200 is not part of the National Highway System, a network of highways that are considered essential to the country's economy, defense, and mobility by the Federal Highway Administration.

== History ==
CA 200 was the old US 299 (formerly old CA 44).

== Major intersections ==
Except where prefixed with a letter, postmiles were measured on the road as it was in 1964, based on the alignment that existed at the time, and do not necessarily reflect current mileage. Postmile prefixes include: R reflecting a realignment in the route since then, M indicating a second realignment, L referring to an overlap due to a correction or change, and T indicating postmiles classified as temporary. Segments that remain unconstructed or have been relinquished to local control may be omitted. The entire route is in Humboldt County.

Location	Postmile	Destinations	Notes
McKinleyville	R0.00	US 101 Bus. (Central Avenue) – McKinleyville	Continuation beyond US 101
McKinleyville	R0.00	US 101 – Crescent City, Eureka	Interchange; west end of SR 200; US 101 exit 718
McKinleyville	1.29	Azalea Avenue – Azalea State Reserve	
	R2.68	SR 299 – Blue Lake, Arcata	Interchange; east end of SR 200; SR 299 exit 2; former US 299
1.000 mi = 1.609 km; 1.000 km = 0.621 mi
