= Bullwinkle =

Bullwinkle or Bullwinkel may refer to:

- Bullwinkle J. Moose, a character in the television shows Rocky and His Friends and The Bullwinkle Show
- Captain Horatio Bullwinkle, Tugboat Annie's antagonist in films and a TV series
- Vivian Bullwinkel (1915–2000), Australian Army nurse and lieutenant colonel, survivor of a Japanese World War II massacre
- Division of Bullwinkel, an Australian electoral division, named after Vivian Bullwinkel
- Bullwinkel or Bullwinkle, former name of Crannell, California, a former settlement
- Bullwinkle (oil platform), in the Gulf of Mexico
- Bullwinkle's Restaurant, a chain of family entertainment centers
