= Crannell, California =

Crannell
- Unincorporated community
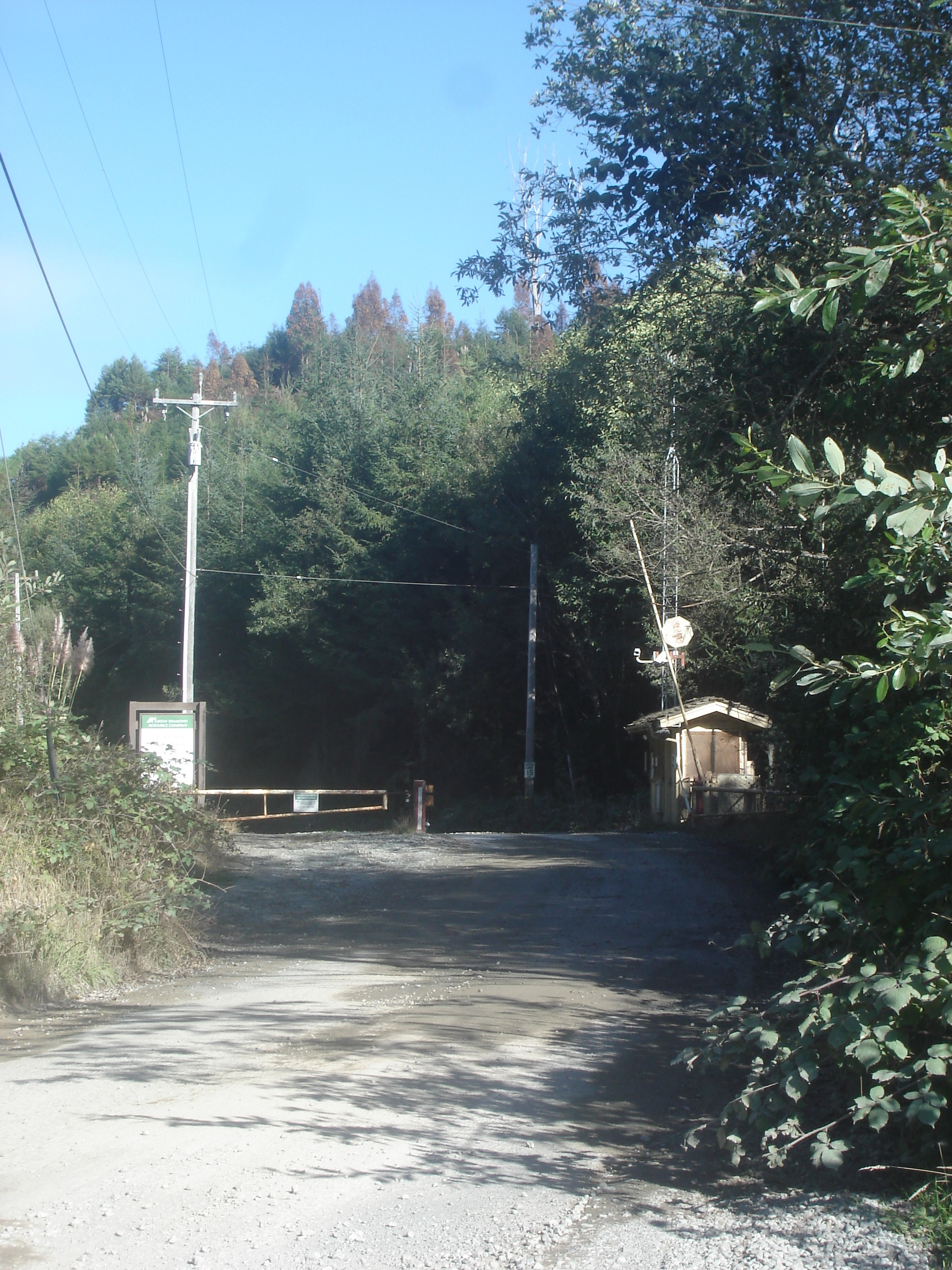
- 21st century Crannell is on private land at the end of Crannell Road from Highway 101.

- Location in California Crannell (the United States)
- Coordinates: 41°00′42″N 124°05′05″W
- Country: United States
- State: California
- County: Humboldt
- Elevation: 203 ft (62 m)

Crannell (formerly, Bullwinkel, Bulwinkle, Crannel, and Camp Nine) is a former settlement in Humboldt County, California, United States. It is located 4.5 miles (7.2 km) southeast of Trinidad, at an elevation of 203 feet (62 m).

The location was formerly a company town for sawmill workers of the Little River Redwood Company, organized in 1893 by owners in Ottawa and western New York. Company headquarters were in Tonawanda. The California sawmill commenced operations in 1908. The post office opened in 1909 was named for property owner Conrad Bulwinkle. In 1922 the community was renamed for Little River Redwood Company president Levi Crannell. The town was served by the Trinidad extension of the Northwestern Pacific Railroad from 1911 to 1933. Little River Redwood Company also built the Humboldt Northern Railway to transfer company freight along the Pacific coast directly to Samoa, California. A 1925 map of Crannell presents the various saw and planning mills, as well as dams and blockades on the Little River for logging transport. The town itself featured tenement housing, offices, and a General Store.

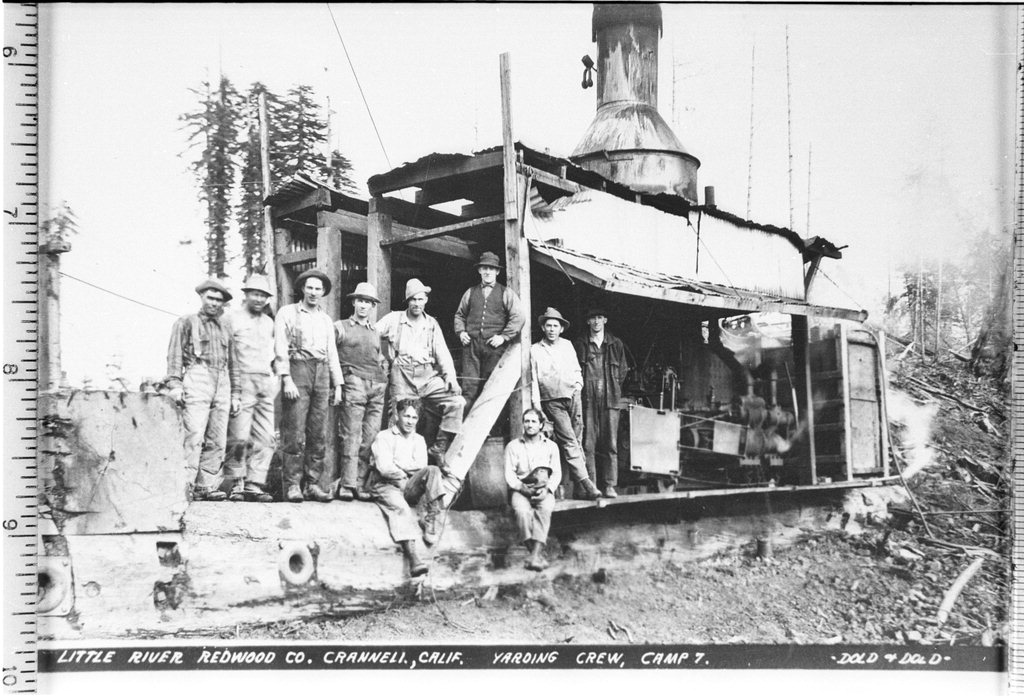
Little River Redwood Company, Crannell.

The Hammond-Little River Redwood Company, Ltd. was formed in a 1931 merger with Hammond Lumber Company. Crannell was called Camp Nine by the Hammond Lumber Company. When Northwestern Pacific Railroad terminated service north of Arcata in 1933, their line through Fieldbrook was abandoned. Hammond Lumber Company took over some of the tracks north of Crannell using the Humboldt Northern Railway connection to Samoa until that was dismantled in 1948 following major wildfire damage to timber trestles on the logging branches north of Crannell in 1945. A portion of the former Humboldt Northern Railway grade through McKinleyville was converted to the Hammond Trail. Hammond became a subsidiary of Georgia-Pacific Corporation in 1956.

Worker housing was razed in 1969, but the site remained in use as an equipment storage and maintenance base for forestry operations of subsequent landowners. The site was transferred to Louisiana-Pacific Corporation during a Federal Trade Commission action initiated in 1972. Simpson Timber Company purchased the property on June 30, 1998, from Robert Lee and Patti Balke, whose family owned the land and lived there since the 1800s. Subsequently, this became Green Diamond Resource Company around 2004. Green Diamond refers to the forested land as "Crannell Tree Farm".

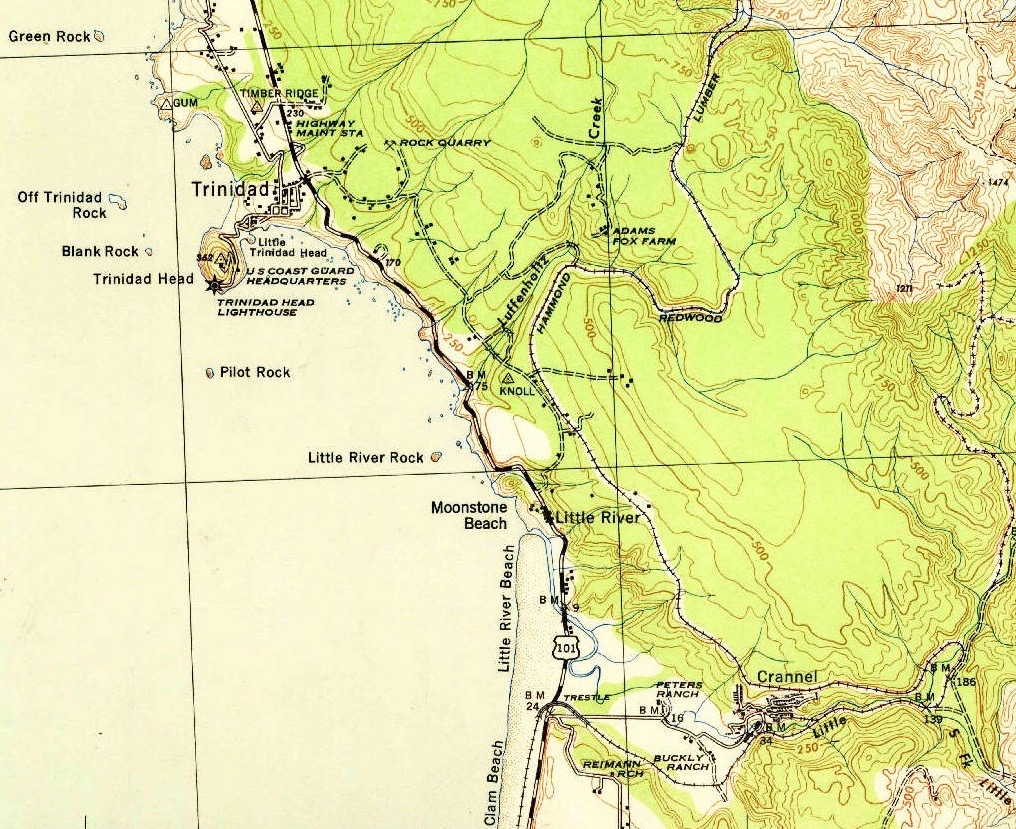
Map of Crannell (lower right) in 1945
