= Little River State Beach =

Protected beach of California, United States, in Humboldt County

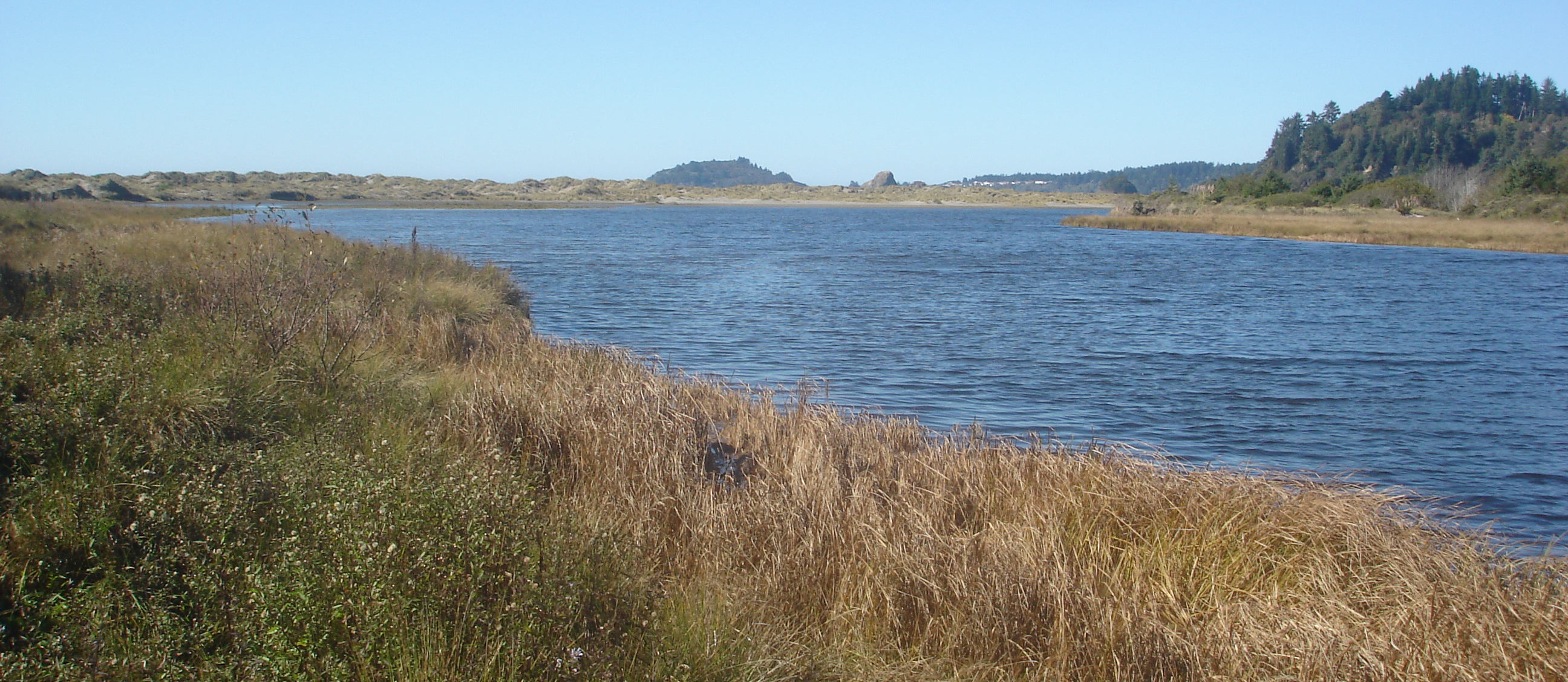
- Little River estuary at the north end of Little River State Beach.

- Location within California Location within the United States
- Location: Humboldt County, United States
- Nearest city: McKinleyville, California
- Coordinates: 41°00′58″N 124°06′35″W
- Area: 152 acres (62 ha)
- Established: 1931
- Governing body: California Department of Parks and Recreation

Little River State Beach is a protected beach of California, United States, in Humboldt County. It is located at the mouth of the Little River, 13 miles (21 km) north of Eureka right off U.S. Route 101. The 152-acre (62 ha) park was established in 1931.

The site is a broad, open beach that contains sand dunes. The Little River forms the north boundary of the beach. It is open for day-use only, but the adjacent Clam Beach County Park provides camping. Hammond Trail provides bicycle and pedestrian access to Clam Beach County Park from McKinleyville, California.

== See also ==
- List of beaches in California
- List of California state parks
- Parks in Humboldt County, California
