= Calville, California =

Calville
- Unincorporated community
- Location in California
- Coordinates: 40°56′10″N 124°06′01″W
- Country: United States
- State: California
- County: Humboldt County
- Elevation: 154 ft (47 m)

Calville was a community in Humboldt County, California, United States, located 4.5 miles (7.2 km) north of Arcata, at an elevation of 154 feet (47 m). It is centered on Sutter Road and Central Avenue, and became part of the large unincorporated community of McKinleyville.
