= California State Route 299 =

State highway in California, United States

State Route 299
- SR 299 highlighted in red

Route information
- Maintained by Caltrans
- Length: 305.777 mi (492.100 km)
- Tourist routes: Trinity Scenic Byway

Major junctions
- West end: US 101 in Arcata
- SR 96 in Willow Creek: SR 3 from Weaverville to Douglas City; I-5 in Redding; SR 89 near Johnson Park; SR 139 from Adin to Canby; US 395 from Alturas to near Surprise Station
- East end: Former SR 8A at the Nevada state line west of Vya, NV

Location
- Country: United States
- State: California
- Counties: Humboldt, Trinity, Shasta, Lassen, Modoc

Highway system
- State highways in California; Interstate; US; State; Scenic; History; Pre‑1964; Unconstructed; Deleted; Freeways
← SR 285	→ SR 330

State Route 299 (SR 299) is an east–west state highway in the U.S. state of California that runs across the northern part of the state. At 305.777 miles (492.100 km), it is the third longest California state route, after Route 1 and Route 99, and the longest east–west route. Route 299's western terminus is at US 101 at the northern edge of Arcata, and its eastern terminus is at the Nevada state line at a point east of Cedarville. Between Arcata and Redding, Route 299 intersects with State Route 96, and is briefly co-signed with State Route 3. In Redding, it intersects with State Route 273, State Route 44, and Interstate 5. East of Redding, it intersects with State Route 89, and a section is co-signed with State Route 139 before reaching Alturas. It is then co-signed with U.S. 395 northeast of Alturas, and then runs east through Cedarville and to the border with Nevada. The ghost town of Vya, Nevada can be reached via this route which, after the border, becomes a dirt road that formerly served as Nevada State Route 8A. The segment of SR 299 between Arcata and Redding is the Trinity Scenic Byway, a National Forest Scenic Byway.

== Route description ==
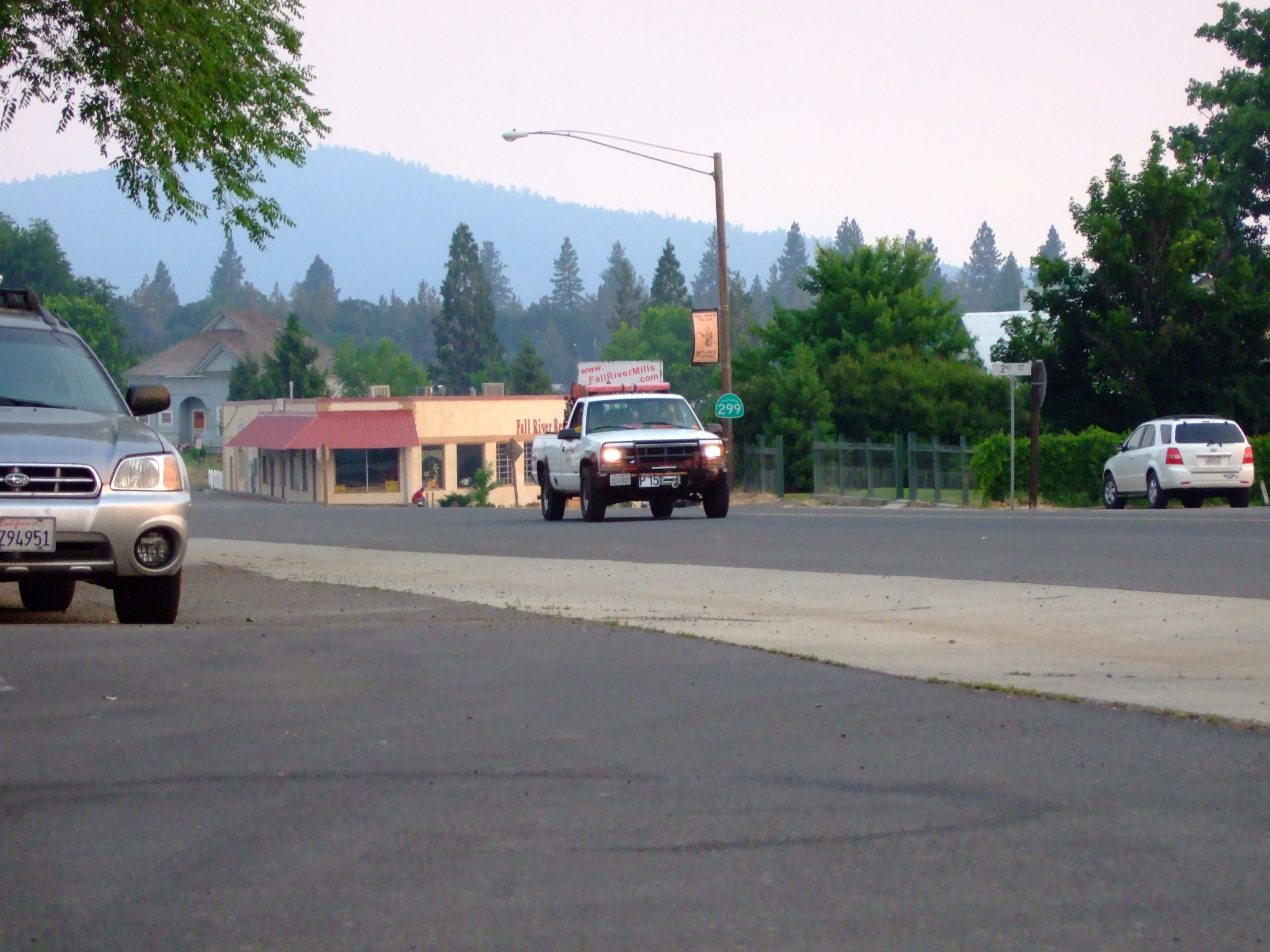
SR 299 through Fall River Mills, Shasta County

Route 299 is defined in section 599 of the California Streets and Highways Code. The definition omits the concurrency with Route 395 instead of duplicating that segment in the other route's definition in the code:

Route 299 is from:
(a) Route 101 near Arcata to Route 395 at Alturas.
(b) Route 395 near Alturas to the Nevada state line via Cedarville.

SR 299 begins in Arcata at a trumpet interchange with US 101 as a freeway. The route has another trumpet interchange with SR 200 after leaving the Arcata city limits and crossing the Mad River. The freeway ends in the city of Blue Lake as SR 299 continues east past the truck scales. SR 299 enters Six Rivers National Forest and intersects SR 96 at Willow Creek. Soon after this, SR 299 crosses into Trinity County and Trinity National Forest. Paralleling the Trinity River, SR 299 passes through Salyer (where there is a rest area), Hawkins Bar, Burnt Ranch, Del Loma, Big Bar, Helena, Junction City, and finally Weaverville.

In Weaverville, SR 299 runs concurrently with SR 3 southbound to Douglas City, where there is a rest area. SR 299 continues east away from the Trinity River into Shasta County, passing by the Whiskeytown-Shasta-Trinity National Recreation Area and through the towns of Tower House and Whiskeytown as well as Whiskeytown Lake. SR 299 continues along Eureka Way through the town of Shasta into the city of Redding. SR 299 then runs concurrently along SR 273 north and Market Street across the Sacramento River before turning east onto its own freeway and intersecting I-5. SR 299 remains a freeway for a few miles before leaving the Redding city limits and passing through the town of Bella Vista and into the foothills of the southern Cascade Range.

SR 299 continues through Ingot, Round Mountain, Montgomery Creek, Hillcrest (after the rest area), Burney, and Johnson Park. The highway intersects with SR 89 before continuing through Fall River Mills and McArthur, where there is an intersection with CR A19. SR 299 then crosses into Lassen County, where it passes through Nubieber and Bieber before intersecting CR A2. The highway crosses into Modoc County and passes through Adin, where it runs concurrently with SR 139 and passes through Modoc National Forest. The concurrency lasts for several miles before SR 299 turns east and enters the city of Alturas. SR 299 runs concurrently with US 395 before turning east again and passing through Cedarville, near the Cedarville Airport. SR 299 ends at the Nevada state line, connecting with the unpaved former Nevada State Route 8A.

SR 299 is part of the California Freeway and Expressway System, and from US 101 to SR 3 and from SR 139 to the eastern junction with US 395 is part of the National Highway System, a network of highways that are considered essential to the country's economy, defense, and mobility by the Federal Highway Administration. Three sections of SR 299 are eligible for inclusion in the State Scenic Highway System: from US 101 to SR 96, from SR 3 to I-5, and from SR 89 to SR 139; however, none are officially designated as a scenic highway by the California Department of Transportation.

== History ==
U.S. Route 299
- Location: Alturas–Arcata
- Existed: 1934–1964

SR 299, from the intersection with US 101 to US 395 in Alturas, was U.S. Route 299 from 1934 to 1964. This was a spur of US 99 running east–west from the junction in Redding, now signed as CA 273 at the intersection of Eureka Way and Market Street. The actual road has been realigned many times, mainly to make easier grades and curves through the mountains, but also to make room for the Whiskeytown Lake reservoir. In many places, especially in Trinity County, the old roadway can be seen beside the new road, and there are even several bridges visible from the current SR 299 that seemingly connect nothing to nothing nowadays, one of which is an arch bridge from 1923. In 1934, 299 was the original State Route 44.

== Major intersections ==
Except where prefixed with a letter, postmiles were measured on the road as it was in 1964, based on the alignment that existed at the time, and do not necessarily reflect current mileage. Postmile prefixes include: R reflecting a realignment in the route since then, M indicating a second realignment, L referring to an overlap due to a correction or change, and T indicating postmiles classified as temporary. Segments that remain unconstructed or have been relinquished to local control may be omitted. The numbers reset at county lines; the start and end postmiles in each county are given in the county column.

County	Location	Postmile	Exit	Destinations	Notes
Humboldt; HUM 0.00-43.04	Arcata	0.00	—	US 101 – Arcata, Eureka, Crescent City	Western terminus; US 101 exit 716A
Humboldt; HUM 0.00-43.04	Arcata	0.72	1	Guintoli Lane	Opened 1972
Humboldt; HUM 0.00-43.04		R1.80	2	SR 200 west (North Bank Road)	Opened 1972; eastern terminus of SR 200
Humboldt; HUM 0.00-43.04			3A	Glendale Drive	Eastbound exit only; opened 1972; connects to Essex Gulch Road
Humboldt; HUM 0.00-43.04	Essex	R2.92	3B	Essex Lane	Opened 1972
Humboldt; HUM 0.00-43.04		R4.04	4	Glendale Drive – Business District	Opened 1972
Humboldt; HUM 0.00-43.04		R5.45	5	Glendale Drive – Blue Lake	Opened 1988; former SR 299; connects to Blue Lake Boulevard
Humboldt; HUM 0.00-43.04		R5.45	East end of freeway		
Humboldt; HUM 0.00-43.04		R7.40	Weigh station (westbound only)		
Humboldt; HUM 0.00-43.04	Willow Creek	38.83		SR 96 east – Hoopa	Western terminus of SR 96
South Fork Trinity River		43.04 0.00		Hlel-Din Memorial Bridge	
Trinity; TRI 0.00-72.25		3.80		Mathews Rest Area	
Trinity; TRI 0.00-72.25	Weaverville	51.57		SR 3 north – Trinity Center, Yreka, Trinity Lake	West end of SR 3 overlap
Trinity; TRI 0.00-72.25		56.80		Moon Lim Lee Rest Area	
Trinity; TRI 0.00-72.25	Douglas City	R58.11		SR 3 south – Hayfork	East end of SR 3 overlap
Trinity–Shasta county line		72.25 0.00		Buckhorn Summit	
Shasta; SHA 0.00-99.36		12.70		Weigh station (eastbound only)	
Shasta; SHA 0.00-99.36	Redding	22.23		Buenaventura Boulevard to SR 273 south – Anderson	Serves Dignity Health – Mercy Medical Center Redding; to SR 273 south not signed westbound
Shasta; SHA 0.00-99.36	Redding	24.09 16.83 (Note: Indicates that the postmile represents the distance along SR 273 rather than SR 299.)		SR 273 south / SR 44 east (Market Street north / Historic US 99) to I-5 south	West end of SR 273/Hist. US 99 overlap; former SR 299 east; western terminus of SR 44
Shasta; SHA 0.00-99.36	Redding	24.09 16.83		Eureka Way ( SR 44 / SR 273 / Historic US 99)	One-way street, inbound access only where SR 44 west/SR 273 north traffic enters in; western terminus of SR 44
Shasta; SHA 0.00-99.36	Redding	18.62 24.09		SR 273 north (Market Street north / Historic US 99) to I-5 north – Portland	East end of SR 273/Hist. US 99 overlap
Shasta; SHA 0.00-99.36	Redding	18.62 24.09		Lake Boulevard west (CR A18)	Southern terminus of CR A18
Shasta; SHA 0.00-99.36	Redding	24.82		I-5 – Portland, Sacramento	Interchange; I-5 exit 680
Shasta; SHA 0.00-99.36	Redding	24.82	West end of freeway		
Shasta; SHA 0.00-99.36	Redding	25.54	141	Churn Creek Road / Hawley Road	Opened 1974
Shasta; SHA 0.00-99.36		27.22	143	Old Oregon Trail	Opened 1974; serves Shasta College
Shasta; SHA 0.00-99.36		27.22	East end of freeway		
Shasta; SHA 0.00-99.36		60.60	Hillcrest Rest Area		
Shasta; SHA 0.00-99.36		80.09		SR 89 – Burney Falls Park, Lassen Park	
Lassen; LAS 0.00-25.64	Bieber	14.93		CR A2 (Susanville Road) / Bieber Lookout Road – Susanville, Lookout, Tulelake	Western terminus of CR A2
Modoc; MOD 0.00-66.63	Adin	0.33		SR 139 south – Susanville	West end of SR 139 overlap
Modoc; MOD 0.00-66.63	Canby	21.75		SR 139 north – Tulelake, Klamath Falls	East end of SR 139 overlap
Modoc; MOD 0.00-66.63	Alturas	40.09		Nagle Street	Serves Modoc Medical Center
Modoc; MOD 0.00-66.63	Alturas	40.63 22.76 (Note: Indicates that the postmile represents the distance along US 395 rather than SR 299.)		US 395 south (Main Street) – Susanville, Reno	West end of US 395 overlap
Modoc; MOD 0.00-66.63		27.10	Agricultural Inspection Station (westbound only)		
Modoc; MOD 0.00-66.63		28.29 40.64		US 395 north – Lakeview	East end of US 395 overlap
Modoc; MOD 0.00-66.63		66.63		Former SR 8A	Eastern terminus; continuation into Nevada; road no longer maintained
1.000 mi = 1.609 km; 1.000 km = 0.621 mi: Concurrency terminus; Incomplete access
