= Glendale, Humboldt County, California =

Unincorporated community in California, United States

Glendale
- Unincorporated community
- Location in California Glendale (the United States)
- Coordinates: 40°53′59″N 124°01′01″W
- Country: United States
- State: California
- County: Humboldt
- Elevation: 92 ft (28 m)

Glendale (Wiyot: p'lèta-kawèti "rocks-white") is an unincorporated community in Humboldt County, California, United States. It is located on the Mad River, 4 miles (6 km) east-northeast of Arcata, at an elevation of 92 feet (28 m).
