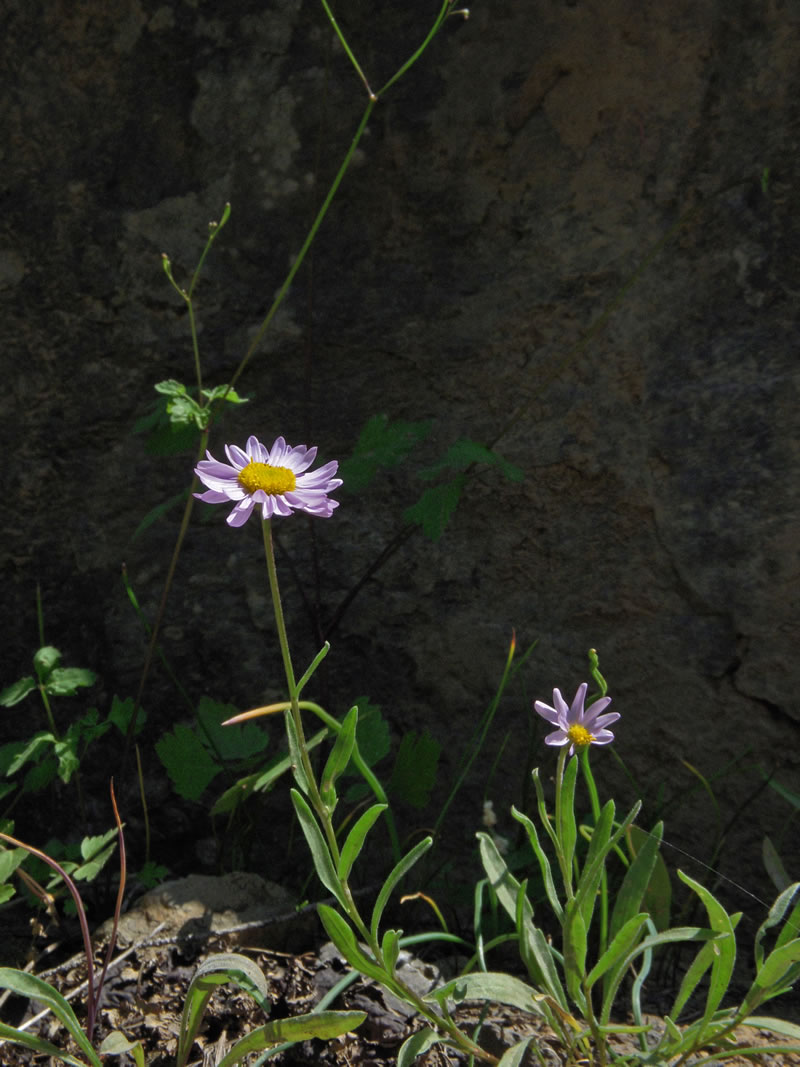

Conservation status
- Critically Imperiled (NatureServe)

Scientific classification
- Kingdom: Plantae
- Clade: Embryophytes
- Clade: Tracheophytes
- Clade: Spermatophytes
- Clade: Angiosperms
- Clade: Eudicots
- Clade: Asterids
- Order: Asterales
- Family: Asteraceae
- Genus: Erigeron
- Species: E. maniopotamicus

Binomial name
- Erigeron maniopotamicus G.L.Nesom & T.W.Nelson

= Erigeron maniopotamicus =

Species of flowering plant

Erigeron maniopotamicus is a rare species of flowering plant in the family Asteraceae known by the common name Mad River fleabane. It is endemic to northwestern California, where it is known from only nineteen locations in Humboldt and Trinity Counties.

Erigeron maniopotamicus grows in open areas in forest, woodland, and meadow habitat along the path of the Mad River, generally in barren areas without much plant cover. The soils are rocky and tan in color and occur near areas of serpentine soils, but the plant does not occur on the serpentine soil.

Erigeron maniopotamicus was described to science in 2004 from a type specimen collected on Board Camp Mountain in Humboldt County in California. The authors named the plant after the Mad River, choosing an epithet derived from Greek words meaning "mad river", using the British definition of the word "mad," corresponding to the American term "crazy."

Erigeron maniopotamicus is a perennial herb growing from a taproot and caudex unit. The stem is up to 27 centimeters (11 inches) tall and has a coating of rough hairs. The leaves are hairy, lance-shaped, and up to 10 centimeters (4 inches) long by 1.4 cm (0.6 inches) wide. The stem and leaves are green or purple-tinged. The inflorescence is a single flower head or a cluster of up to 4 heads. Each head has a lining of pointed phyllaries which are green with orange midnerves. It contains up to 33 white, pinkish, or purple ray florets each about a centimeter (0.4 inches) long, surrounding numerous yellow disc florets.

Potential threats to the species include grazing of cattle, logging, and activity related to the logging industry including construction, maintenance of roads, and dumping.
