= Ranney collector =

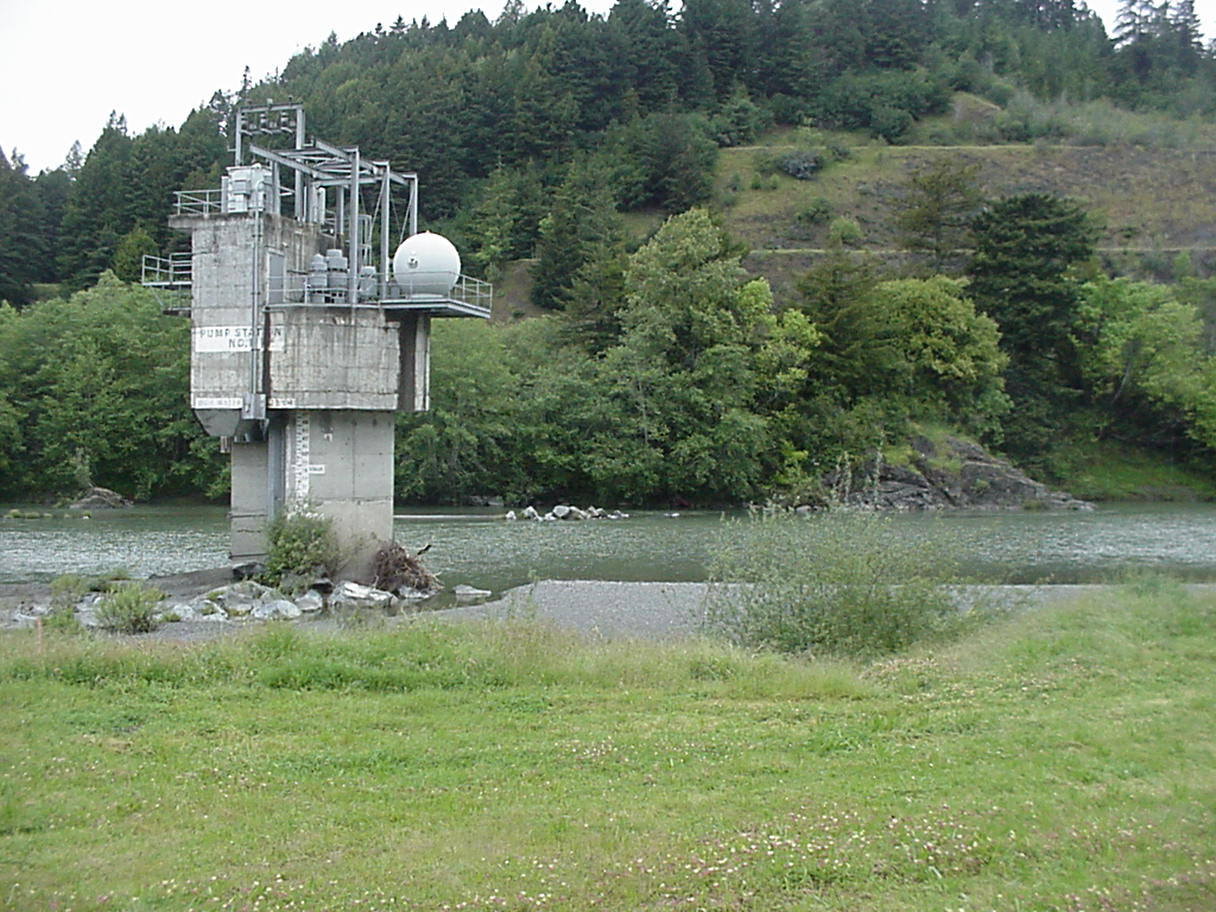
Ranney collector on the Mad River provides the water supply for communities surrounding Humboldt Bay.

A Ranney Collector is a type of radial well used to extract water from an aquifer with direct connection to a surface water source like a river or lake. The amount of water available from the collector is typically related more to the surface water source than to the piezometric surface of the aquifer.

== Description ==
A caisson is constructed of reinforced concrete and installed into sand or gravel below the surface level of an adjacent river or lake. Screened conduits (also referred to as laterals or lateral well screens) are extended horizontally from ports in the caisson about 60 meters (200 feet) into surrounding water-bearing alluvium. The radial arrangement of screens forms a large infiltration gallery with a single central withdrawal point. A single collector may produce as much as 25 million gallons per day. Bank filtration of water through aquifer soils may reduce water treatment requirements.

== History ==
Texas petroleum engineer Leo Ranney drilled horizontally for oil in the early 1920s. The first Ranney collector for water was installed in London in 1933. Hundreds of Ranney collectors have been built since.
