= Hawkins Bar, California =

Unincorporated community in California, United States

- Unincorporated community
- Location within California Location within the United States
- Coordinates: 40°52′12″N 123°31′22″W
- Country: United States
- State: California
- County: Trinity
- Elevation: 771 ft (235 m)
- Time zone: UTC-8 (Pacific (PST))
  - Summer (DST): UTC-7 (PDT)
- Area code: 530
- GNIS feature ID: 1658722

Hawkins Bar is an unincorporated community in Trinity County, California, United States. Hawkins Bar is located on California State Route 299, 7.4 miles (11.9 km) southeast of Willow Creek. The elevation is 771 feet (235 m). The terrain in the area is fairly steep and forested. It is also known as Trinity Village. It sits near a large flat formed by the Trinity River and Hawkins Creek.

== Climate ==
This region experiences warm (but not hot) and dry summers, with no average monthly temperatures above 71.6 °F. According to the Köppen Climate Classification system, Hawkins Bar has a warm-summer Mediterranean climate, abbreviated "Csb" on climate maps.

== See also ==
- Trinity County, California
