= Hammond Trail =

Rail trail in California, United States

Coordinates: 41.0132°N 124.1093°W

The Hammond Trail is a northern California rail trail along the Pacific coast in Humboldt County. The 5.5 mi (8.9 km) hiking and biking trail follows the historic Hammond Lumber Company's Humboldt Northern Railway grade from the Mad River to Little River State Beach.

== Route ==
The southern end of Hammond trail is on the north bank of the Mad River. The trail follows Fischer Avenue climbing into the western edge of McKinleyville where a separate trail begins along the east side of Fischer Avenue from School Street to Hiller Park. Leaving Hiller park the trail enters woodlands along the eastern edge of the McKinleyville sewage treatment ponds and emerges atop a steep bluff above the north bank of the Mad River. At Murray Road trail users may either follow the west branch of the trail above the Mad River to reach the Widow White Creek interpretive trail or travel east on Murray Road to turn north again where the east branch of the trail follows the west side of highway 101. Following convergence with the eastern end of the Widow White Creek interpretive trail, Hammond Trail continues north along Letz Avenue and then past a highway 101 vista point where the trail leaves the former railroad grade to drop into the Clam Beach County Park dunes between the Pacific coast and highway 101.

== History ==
The southern portion of Hammond Trail was built on an abandoned logging railroad which once carried redwood logs to Samoa sawmills from forests between Trinidad and Big Lagoon until a 1945 wildfire destroyed many of the wooden trestle bridges. The last logging train ran on 23 August 1948. Trail construction began in 1979 and was completed in 2001. Hammond Trail is a segment of the California Coastal Trail.

== Facilities ==
Some of the trail has asphalt concrete pavement while other segments have a gravel surface. Public toilets are available at Hiller Park and at Clam Beach County Park, where camping facilities are also available. Leashed dogs are allowed on the trail.
