= Ingot, California =

Unincorporated community in California, United States

- Unincorporated community
- Location within California Location within the United States
- Coordinates: 40°43′40″N 122°04′45″W
- Country: United States
- State: California
- County: Shasta
- Elevation: 1,158 ft (353 m)
- Time zone: UTC-8 (Pacific (PST))
  - Summer (DST): UTC-7 (PDT)
- Area code: 530
- GNIS feature ID: 261788

Ingot is an unincorporated community in Shasta County, California, United States. The community is on California State Route 299, 19 miles (31 km) east-northeast of Redding.
