= Azalea State Natural Reserve =

Nature reserve in California

- IUCN category V (protected landscape/seascape)
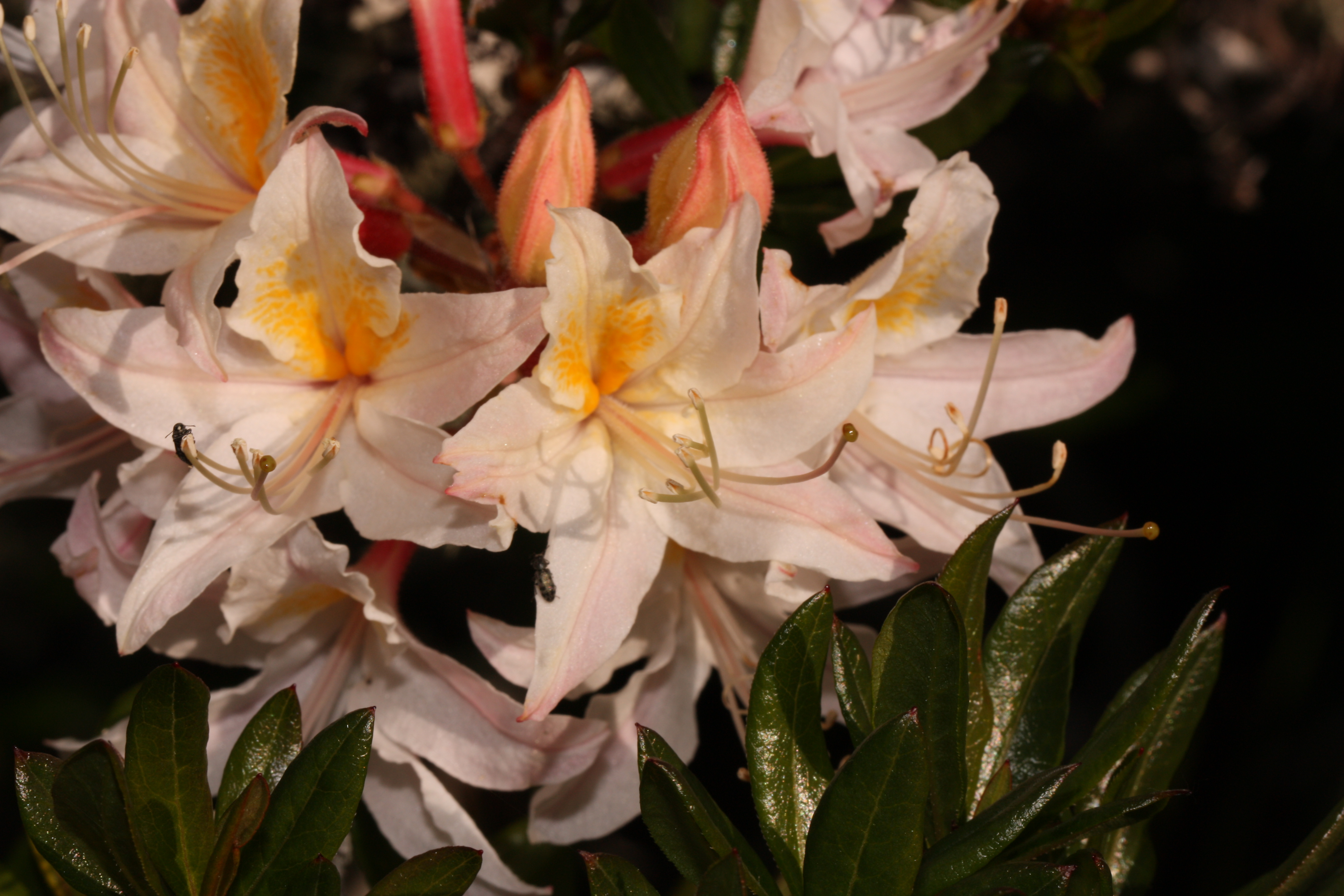
- Western Azalea

- Location within California Location within the United States
- Location: 809 Azalea Ave, McKinleyville, Humboldt County, California, United States
- Nearest city: Arcata, California
- Coordinates: 40°55′6″N 124°4′48″W
- Area: 30 acres (12 ha)
- Established: 1943
- Governing body: California Department of Parks and Recreation

Azalea State Natural Reserve is a state nature reserve of California, United States, located in McKinleyville, an unincorporated area of Humboldt County. This area is just north of the college town of Arcata and slightly above the Mad River not far from where it enters the Pacific Ocean. The reserve is dedicated to the preservation of the western azalea (Rhododendron occidentale), whose pink and white flowers bloom in profusion each April and May. It has a short self-guided nature trail with emphasis on plants of the north coast region. There is a picnic area available. The 30-acre (12 ha) property was acquired by the state in 1943.

Other adjacent visitor attractions include Trinidad State Beach, Sue-meg State Park, and Fort Humboldt State Historic Park.

== See also ==
- List of California state parks
