= Del Loma, California =

Unincorporated community in California, United States

- Unincorporated community
- Location within California Location within the United States
- Coordinates: 40°46′43″N 123°19′56″W
- Country: United States
- State: California
- County: Trinity
- Elevation: 1,168 ft (356 m)
- Time zone: UTC-8 (Pacific (PST))
  - Summer (DST): UTC-7 (PDT)
- Area code: 530
- GNIS feature ID: 1655962

Del Loma (corruption of de la Loma, Spanish for "of the Hill") is an unincorporated community in Trinity County, California, United States. Del Loma is located on California State Route 299, 20.8 miles (33.5 km) west of Weaverville. Surrounded by steep terrain and dense forest, Del Loma sits along the Trinity River near Canadian Bar and Tonys Point.

== History ==
Del Loma had a post office from 1928 to 1953

== See also ==
- Trinity County, California
