= Johnson Park =

Municipal park in Victoria, Australia

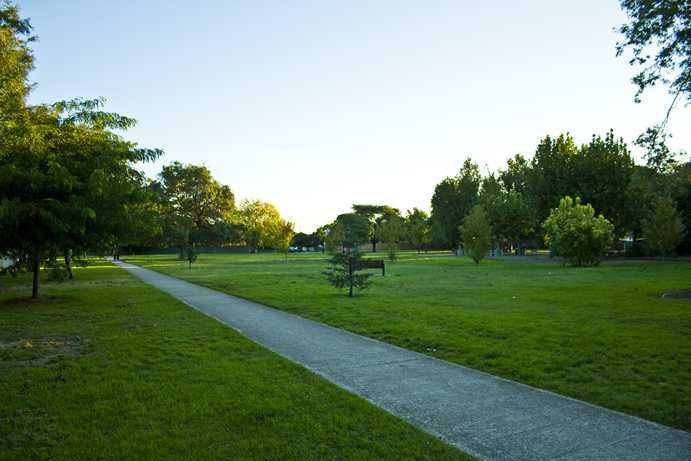
- A view of Johnson Park taken from the eastern boundary path looking south.
- Location: Northcote, Melbourne
- Area: 2 hectares (4.9 acres)
- Opened: Circa 1913
- Operator: City of Darebin
- Paths: Pedestrian and bicycle access throughout
- Vegetation: indigenous and exotic
- Public transit: bus, train and tram
- Facilities: Toilets, barbecues, playground

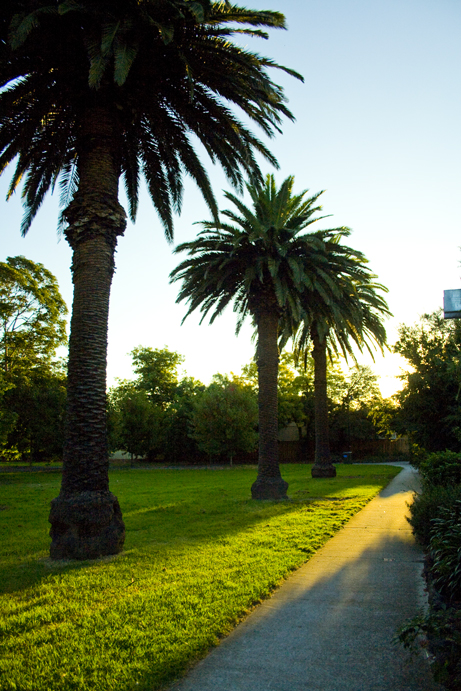
A shot of the Canary Island Palms on the northern boundary of Johnson Park.

Johnson Park is a small municipal park of almost 2 hectares (4.9 acres) in area in the suburb of Northcote in the state of Victoria, Australia. The Park is situated approximately 8 kilometres (5.0 mi) from the central business district of Melbourne and is a significant public recreational space for local Northcote residents and the surrounding community.

== Location ==
Johnson Park exists as part of the original Jika Jika parish land sold at a Government land sale in Melbourne on 3 October 1859. The main frontage and entrance to the Park is sited on the south side of Bastings Street, Northcote approximately 60 metres west from the intersection of that street with Victoria Road.

== Design ==
The City of Darebin holds few early plans of Johnson Park. Except for one notable exception, the plans held by Council relate to recent developments at the Park only. As with many early small suburban parks in Melbourne, little information is known about the designer of Johnson Park. Council holds a small plan of the central garden bed dated 5 May 1921. This plan is the earliest and only known record for Johnson Park as well as the nearby Batman and Penders Parks which were developed during the same period. Early documents suggest that William Howitt may have been the designer of Johnson Park but the matter cannot be proved definitively.

== Features ==
Johnson Park offers a range of features including open areas, garden beds, mature exotic and native Australian trees and shrubs, a pergola, a playground and playground equipment, paths, seating, lighting, BBQ and rest facilities. The Park has many mature trees including elm, plane and oak trees as well as many silky oak and eucalyptus trees. The Park also features a formal stand of Canary Island Palms on its northern boundary.

== Pre European settlement ==
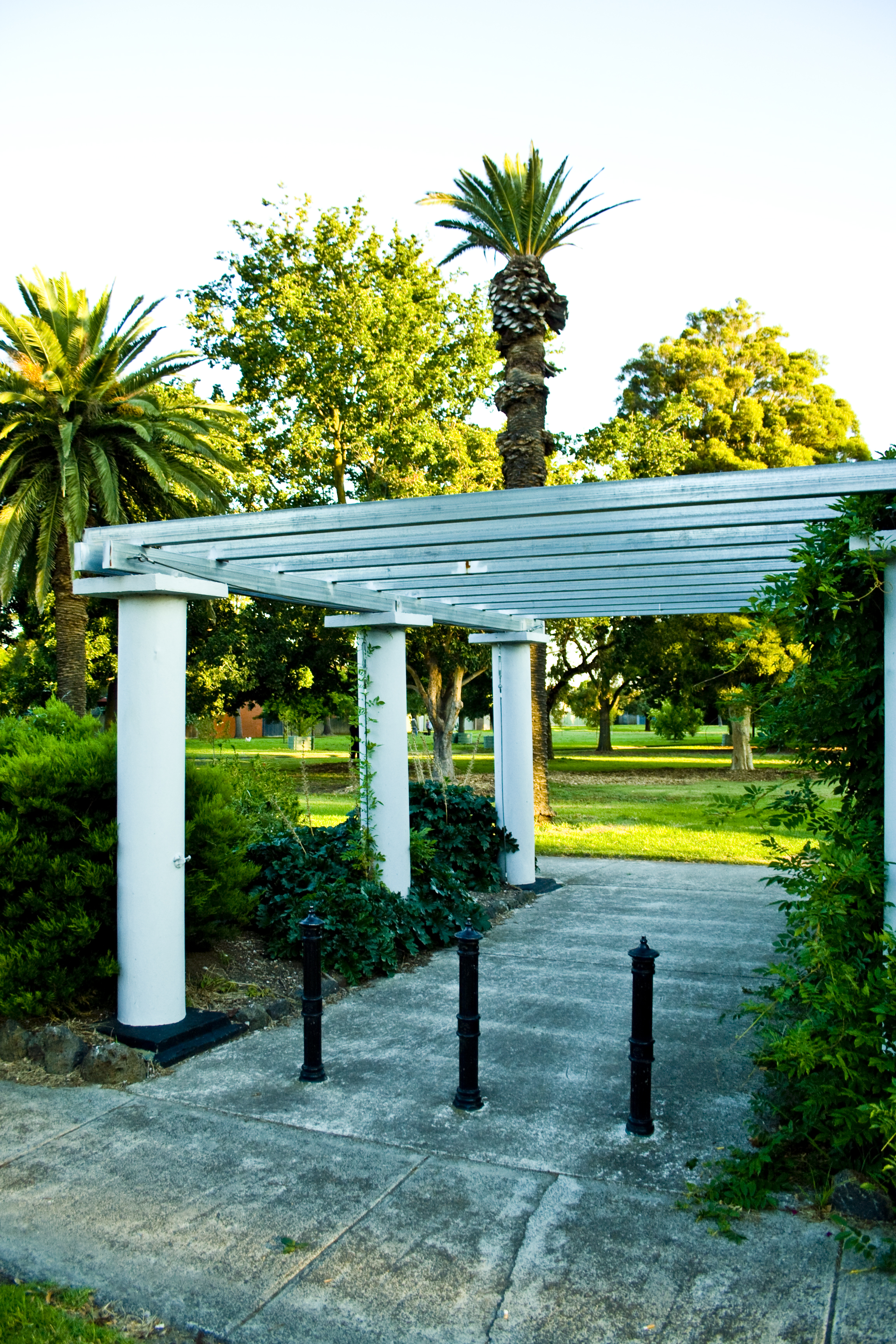
The pergola entrance on the northern border of Johnson Park on Bastings Street. The pergola is believed to be an original feature of the 1913 design of the Park.

The land where Johnson Park stands today belonged to the Wurundjeri-willampatriliny people. These native people formed part of the same language group as those who lived between the Maribyrnong and Werribee Rivers, extending northwards to Mount Macedon and eastwards to Wilson's Promontory.

The land on which Johnson Park is situated is of recent basalt structure typical of the flatter or gently undulating land in the northern suburbs of Melbourne. The soils are generally uniform shallow dark grey textured expansive clays over basalt with some rocky outcrops. Grasses, in particular kangaroo grass, would have dominated this landscape. River red gums, drooping sheoaks and small clumps of shrubs would also have been scattered through the landscape. The land appeared to the English settlers as good land for grazing. The parcel of land on which Johnson Park is now situated was described as a rocky five acres.

== Pressure for more public parks 1906–1913 ==
The local press reported on the pressure for more public parkland in Northcote towards the end of 1906. The South Ward Ratepayers' passed a resolution and forwarded a letter to the then Northcote Council seeking more playgrounds for the children of the town of Northcote. As the pressure for parks increased, the Mayor of Northcote called a public meeting on 7 December 1906 in the Town Hall. There were between 70 and 100 people at the meeting indicating the importance of this issue to the public. Prevalent at this time was the concern for public space. Open space was seen as the "lungs of the city", particularly in working class suburbs.

The community pressure led to the purchase of land for parks and gardens in Northcote. By 1933, the Town Clerk reported that over 18,000 pounds had been spent acquiring areas for parks including Johnson Park and other parks in the municipality including Batman Park, Pender's Park and Merri Park.

== Development of the Park 1913–1930 ==
In 1913, five acres of land was bought by Northcote Council on the flat low lying basalt soils between Rucker Hill and the Darebin Creek. Originally known as the East Ward Park, the area was slowly transformed into what was to become Johnson Park.

In April 1927, in a review of the parks in Northcote, the Town Clerk W.G Swift wrote –

"Parks are the lungs of a city; indeed they are more than this, as they provide for the recreation, rest and education of the citizens. But to meet all these requirements they must be well designed and well maintained, so as to charm all visitors, and create a desire to return to admire the beauties of the surroundings. We have Northcote, Merri, Batman, Johnson, Pender's and McDonnell Parks, and also the recently acquired area in the north-west portion of the city."

Swift described Johnson Park as being –

"...very refreshing with its green lawns, but lacking the art of the landscape gardener. All lines are straight, and no attempt to obscure the view and too much space. It would be a great improvement to construct a lily pond, edged with rockwork, and with a fountain it could be made a leading feature of the reserve. The thought strikes one – why should all lawns be level; if gentle rises were planned here and there it would have a good effect, as the whole area being flat, some relief would be an advantage."

In May 1927, the Parks and Baths Committee of the Northcote Council authorised the City Surveyor to plant trees in the parks to conform with the "completed scheme of beautification".

== History 1930–2014 ==
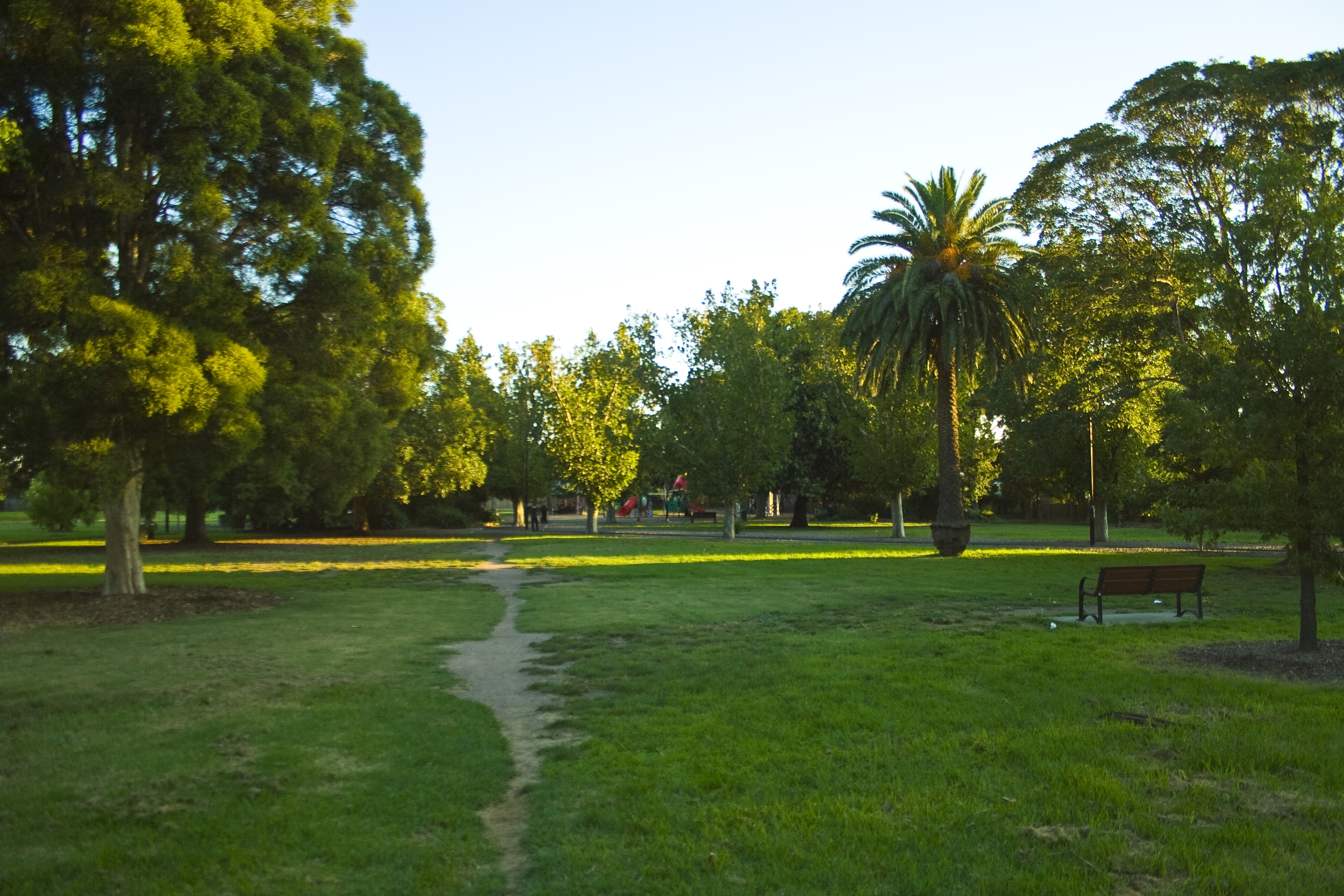
Looking south towards the picnic rotunda and playground.

A tour of the City of Northcote was undertaken on 23 May 1933 as part of the Northcote Jubilee Celebrations. Visitors taking part in the Tour of the City were requested to assemble in the Town Hall, at the Westbourne Grove entrance, at 2 pm. Places were allocated to cars and the procession traversed the following route –

"Turning right into Victoria Road and continuing to Bastings Street, and again turning west to pass possibly the best laid-out gardens in the City, known as Johnson Park..."

Changes to the park layout that occurred during the period from 1930 to 2003 can be traced though comparison of park plans. Unfortunately, as was done for Batman and Penders Parks, no large scale plans appear to have been drawn up for Johnson Park to show proposed or existing conditions before works were undertaken. It therefore seems that the changes which occurred in the Park during this period were part of an incremental simplifying of the park rather than as a result of a major landscape upgrade as occurred with the other two parks. During these times, additional items were added to the Park including a picnic rotunda, barbecues, tables, seats and additional playground equipment. Additional tree planting also occurred but this did not substantially alter what was presumed to be the original park layout. Far more substantial over this period was the loss of the eastern boundary and central feature paths and their associated avenue planting.

== Recent history 2004–current day ==
Johnson Park was the subject of a community action campaign during 2002 and 2004 among residents who expressed concern about the neglected state of the Park. Local residents formed a group called Friends of Johnson Park to advocate for immediate restoration and improvement works. In 2014 local community members resurrected their concerns about the care and maintenance of the horticultural environment of Johnson Park. Informal concerns rapidly escalated to a community convened public meeting when numerous trees were removed by Darebin City Council contract arborists and a meeting confirmed many trees were in very poor health and tree maintenance had been lacking. Subsequent meetings of community members, and one with a Darebin City Council representative, resulted in a commitment to work together to rejuvenate and care for the living environment in the park. With the park master plan apparently expired, concerns raised were for the decline in native birds and the need to increase nesting, food and protective habitat; a desire to increase the tree coverage to historical levels; to screen the boundary assorted fences with native shrubs and ground covers; and to increase opportunities for natural playspaces for children. Community members involved in this latest campaign include some members of the original "Friends of Johnson Park" as well as more recent residents, neighbours, and families who use the park. In October 2014 Darebin City Council planted numerous replacement trees, protected by vandal guards. The community and Council continue to work together to develop a co-design demonstration project for the park focusing on planting/greening the park.

The Northcote Leader on 19 February 2003 reported that "Friends of Johnson Park spokesman Ian Shepherd said the poor state of the park was due to systematic neglect by the Darebin Council over many years". The spokesperson proceeded to claim that the park was like "a desert" and that its then state was "an outrage". Serious concern was also expressed about removal of trees without community consultation and numbers of premature tree deaths. A City of Darebin spokesperson responded that "drought conditions are taking their toll on the grass and the trees". Concerns about the "parched state" of Johnson Park and other inner city parks was also reported in the Melbourne Times newspaper.

Public meetings held by the Friends of Johnson Park Group and the City of Darebin ultimately led to the Council engaging landscape consultants to prepare a master plan to guide a series of improvements to the Park. A 2004 review of the Park reported that –

"(T)the overall health of the tree population is unsatisfactory. A significant number of trees have growth requirements that are not able to met (sic) by existing soil moisture conditions and are stressed or have senesced prematurely. ... The key design elements of the park have been significantly diminished by premature tree death, these deaths most likely attributable to inadequate moisture for the planted tree species."

The City of Darebin subsequently undertook a range of improvement works at the Park including the addition of a path along the entire eastern boundary, a new central path joining the western path at the Park, tree planting, new watering arrangements for certain trees, a complete new lighting scheme and a new playground. The changes were endorsed by local residents and were well received by the local community.

== See also ==
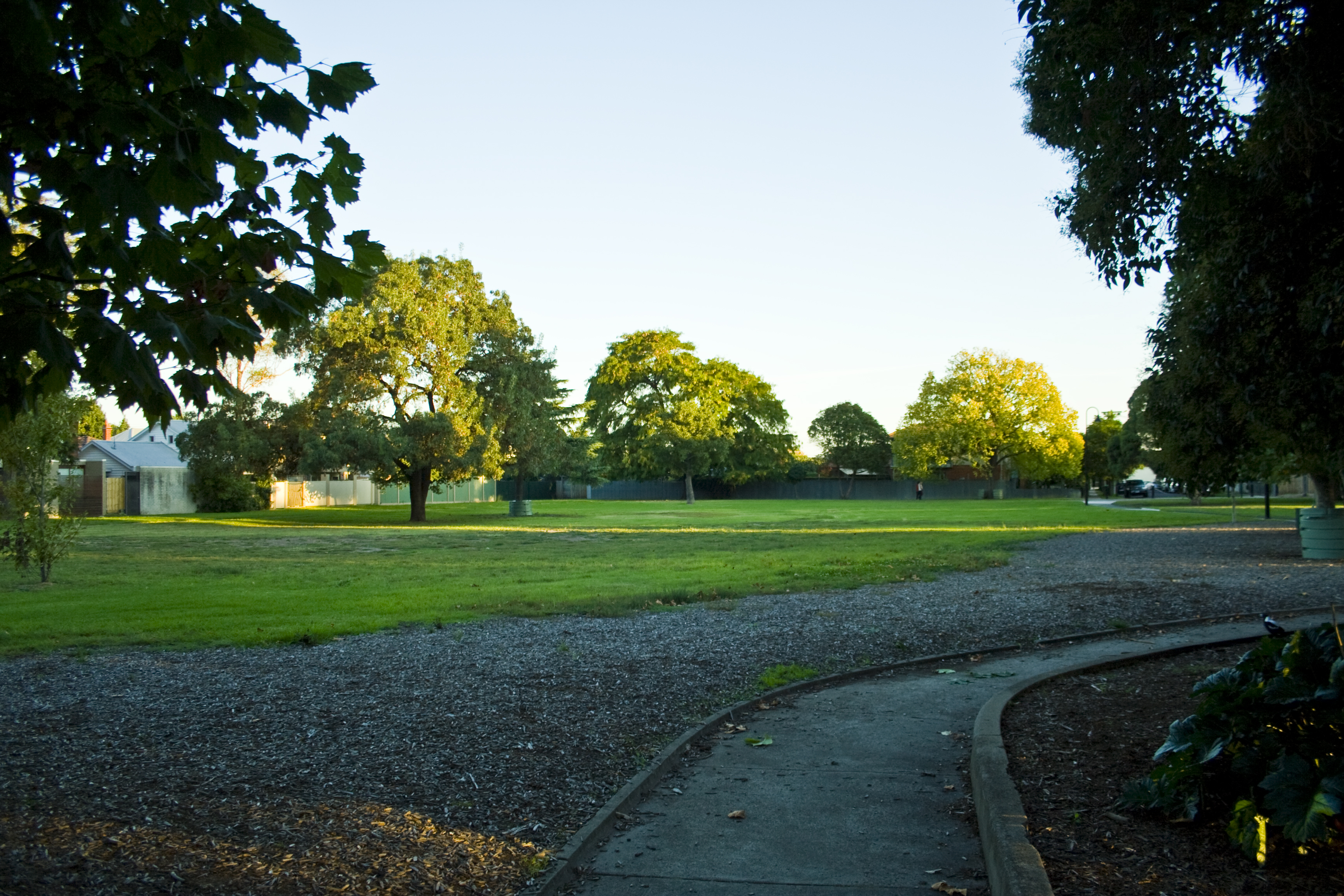
Looking south east at Johnson Park towards the open play area.

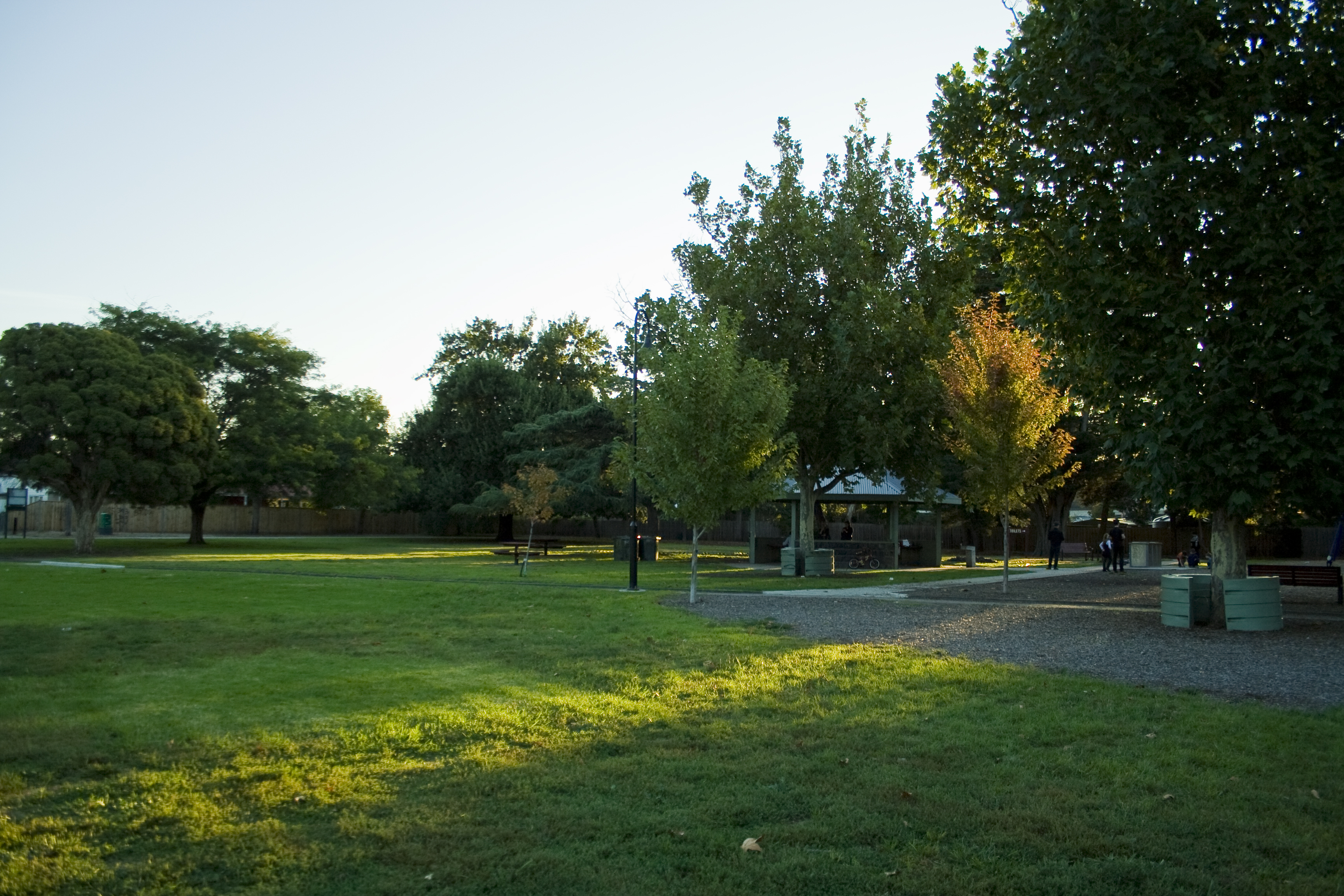
Looking south west at Johnson Park towards the picnic rotunda and playground.

- Park
- Public space
- Public open space
- Public good
- Landscape architecture
- City of Darebin
- Fitzroy Baseball Club
- Thornbury, Victoria
