= Johnson Park, California =

- Unincorporated community Census-designated place
- Location within California Location within the United States
- Coordinates: 40°55′15″N 121°37′26″W
- Country: United States
- State: California
- County: Shasta

Area
  - Total: 0.90 sq mi (2.34 km^{2})
  - Land: 0.90 sq mi (2.34 km^{2})
  - Water: 0 sq mi (0.0 km^{2})
- Elevation: 3,200 ft (980 m)

Population (2020)
  - Total: 686
  - Density: 759/sq mi (293/km^{2})
- Time zone: UTC-8 (Pacific (PST))
  - Summer (DST): UTC-7 (PDT)
- ZIP Code: 96013 (Burney)
- Area code: 530
- FIPS code: 06-37442
- GNIS feature ID: 2813351

Johnson Park is an unincorporated community and census-designated place (CDP) in eastern Shasta County, California, United States. It is located on California State Route 299, 3 miles (5 km) northeast of Burney. Its population is 686 as of the 2020 census.

== Demographics ==
Historical population
| Census | Pop. | Note | %± |
|---|---|---|---|
| 2020 | 686 | | — |
U.S. Decennial Census; 1850–1870 1880-1890; 1900 1910 1920; 1930 1940 1950; 1960 1970 1980; 1990 2000 2010 2020

Johnson Park first appeared as a census designated place in the 2020 U.S. census.

=== 2020 Census ===
Johnson Park CDP, California – Racial and ethnic composition Note: the US Census treats Hispanic/Latino as an ethnic category. This table excludes Latinos from the racial categories and assigns them to a separate category. Hispanics/Latinos may be of any race.
| Race / Ethnicity (NH = Non-Hispanic) | Pop 2020 | % 2020 |
|---|---|---|
| White alone (NH) | 509 | 74.20% |
| Black or African American alone (NH) | 2 | 0.29% |
| Native American or Alaska Native alone (NH) | 41 | 5.98% |
| Asian alone (NH) | 5 | 0.73% |
| Pacific Islander alone (NH) | 0 | 0.00% |
| Other race alone (NH) | 0 | 0.00% |
| Mixed race or Multiracial (NH) | 48 | 7.00% |
| Hispanic or Latino (any race) | 81 | 11.81% |
| Total | 686 | 100.00% |
