= McKinleyville, California =

McKinleyville
- census-designated place
- Old McKinleyville Store
- Interactive map of McKinleyville
- Location in California Location in the United States
- Coordinates: 40°56′47″N 124°06′02″W
- Country: United States
- State: California
- County: Humboldt

Area
  - Total: 21.135 sq mi (54.740 km^{2})
  - Land: 20.882 sq mi (54.083 km^{2})
  - Water: 0.254 sq mi (0.657 km^{2}) 1.2%
- Elevation: 141 ft (43 m)

Population (2020)
  - Total: 16,262
  - Density: 778.77/sq mi (300.69/km^{2})
- Time zone: UTC-8 (Pacific (PST))
  - Summer (DST): UTC-7 (PDT)
- ZIP codes: 95519, 95521
- Area code: 707
- FIPS code: 06-44910
- GNIS feature ID: 1659090

McKinleyville (formerly Minorsville) is a census-designated place (CDP) in Humboldt County, California, United States. McKinleyville is located 5.25 miles (8.4 km) north of Arcata, at an elevation of 141 feet (43 m). The population was 16,262 at the 2020 census, up from 15,177 at the 2010 census.

This unincorporated community is the third largest community, after Eureka and Arcata, on the far North Coast. It is also the location of the Arcata–Eureka Airport, the largest airport in Humboldt County and the region.

== History ==
The Wiyot and Yurok people continue to live here in their traditional territories and both groups are ingrained within the McKinleyville community.

McKinleyville is a community made up of a combination of smaller settlements. Joe Dows settled in the general area in the 1860s and that area was known as Dows Prairie. Slightly south was a small community called Minor (also known as Minorville). Minor was first settled in the late 19th century. Just south of Minor was Calville. Calville was settled by the employees of the California Barrel Company. After President William McKinley was assassinated in 1901, the community of Minor changed its name to McKinleyville in his honor. All three areas are collectively considered to be part of McKinleyville.

The first post office at McKinleyville opened in 1903, closed in 1921, and was reopened in 1955.

McKinleyville is a community with mainly retail and professional businesses to serve its residents but is not an incorporated city or town.

== Geography ==
According to the United States Census Bureau, the CDP has a total area of 21.1 square miles (55 km^{2}), of which 20.9 square miles (54 km^{2}) is land and 0.25 square miles (0.65 km^{2}), or 1.2%, is water.

McKinleyville consists of several watershed areas. The north bank of the Mad River is the farthest watershed to the south. The next watershed to the north is Mill Creek, then Widow White Creek, Norton Creek, Strawberry Creek, Patrick Creek and finally the farthest watershed to the north is the south bank of the Little River. To the west lies the Pacific Ocean.

=== Climate ===
The area sees summers that are not as foggy as Eureka and Arcata to the south, and run a few degrees warmer. McKinleyville has a cool-summer Mediterranean climate (Köppen Csb) typical of the North Coast that is characterized by mild, rainy winters and cool, mild summers, with an average temperature of 55°F (13 °C). The area experiences coastal influence fog all year round.

Climate data for McKinleyville, California
Month	Jan	Feb	Mar	Apr	May	Jun	Jul	Aug	Sep	Oct	Nov	Dec	Year
Mean daily maximum °F (°C)	54.4 (12.4)	55.2 (12.9)	56.1 (13.4)	57.3 (14.1)	59.9 (15.5)	62.0 (16.7)	63.7 (17.6)	64.7 (18.2)	64.8 (18.2)	62.6 (17.0)	57.1 (13.9)	53.7 (12.1)	59.3 (15.2)
Daily mean °F (°C)	46.8 (8.2)	47.5 (8.6)	48.3 (9.1)	49.6 (9.8)	52.6 (11.4)	55.0 (12.8)	57.1 (13.9)	57.8 (14.3)	56.4 (13.6)	53.7 (12.1)	49.4 (9.7)	46.2 (7.9)	51.7 (11.0)
Mean daily minimum °F (°C)	39.2 (4.0)	39.7 (4.3)	40.4 (4.7)	41.8 (5.4)	45.2 (7.3)	48.0 (8.9)	50.4 (10.2)	50.8 (10.4)	47.9 (8.8)	44.7 (7.1)	41.6 (5.3)	38.6 (3.7)	44.0 (6.7)
Average precipitation inches (mm)	8.1 (210)	6.9 (180)	6.6 (170)	4.3 (110)	2.5 (64)	1.2 (30)	0.3 (7.6)	0.4 (10)	0.8 (20)	3.0 (76)	6.9 (180)	9.4 (240)	50.4 (1,297.6)
Average snowfall inches (cm)	0 (0)	0.3 (0.76)	0 (0)	0 (0)	0 (0)	0 (0)	0 (0)	0 (0)	0 (0)	0 (0)	0 (0)	0.2 (0.51)	0.5 (1.27)
Average rainy days	16.9	15.0	16.6	13.5	9.6	5.6	2.6	2.9	4.4	8.4	15.7	17.6	128.8
Average snowy days	0.1	0.1	0	0	0	0	0	0	0	0	0	0.1	0.3

== Demographics ==
Historical population
Census	Pop.	Note	%±
1980	7,772		—
1990	10,749		38.3%
2000	13,599		26.5%
2010	15,177		11.6%
2020	16,262		7.1%
2021 (est.)	16,457	▲	1.2%
U.S. Decennial Census; 1880-1980; 1860–1870 1880-1890; 1900 1910 1920; 1930 1940 1950; 1960 1970 1980; 1990 2000 2010; 2020

McKinleyville first appeared as a census designated place in the 1980 U.S. census.

=== Racial and ethnic composition ===
McKinleyville CDP, California – Racial and ethnic composition Note: the US Census treats Hispanic/Latino as an ethnic category. This table excludes Latinos from the racial categories and assigns them to a separate category. Hispanics/Latinos may be of any race.
Race / Ethnicity (NH = Non-Hispanic)	Pop 2000	Pop 2010	Pop 2020	% 2000	% 2010	% 2020
White alone (NH)	11,649	12,499	11,806	85.66%	82.35%	72.60%
Black or African American alone (NH)	48	95	140	0.35%	0.63%	0.86%
Native American or Alaska Native alone (NH)	570	623	737	4.19%	4.10%	4.53%
Asian alone (NH)	142	205	258	1.04%	1.35%	1.59%
Native Hawaiian or Pacific Islander alone (NH)	8	15	20	0.06%	0.10%	0.12%
Other race alone (NH)	41	42	123	0.30%	0.28%	0.76%
Mixed race or Multiracial (NH)	552	617	1,486	4.06%	4.07%	9.14%
Hispanic or Latino (any race)	589	1,081	1,692	4.33%	7.12%	10.40%
Total	13,599	15,177	16,262	100.00%	100.00%	100.00%

=== 2020 census ===
As of the 2020 census, McKinleyville had a population of 16,262. The population density was 778.8 inhabitants per square mile (300.7/km^{2}).

The census reported that 99.3% of the population lived in households, 0.7% lived in non-institutionalized group quarters, and no one was institutionalized. 92.2% of residents lived in urban areas, while 7.8% lived in rural areas.

There were 6,726 households, out of which 28.6% had children under the age of 18 living in them. Of all households, 42.0% were married-couple households, 11.6% were cohabiting couple households, 19.5% had a male householder with no spouse or partner present, and 26.9% had a female householder with no spouse or partner present. About 28.6% of all households were made up of individuals, and 11.8% had someone living alone who was 65 years of age or older. The average household size was 2.4. There were 4,081 families (60.7% of all households).

The age distribution was 21.4% under the age of 18, 7.4% aged 18 to 24, 29.4% aged 25 to 44, 24.2% aged 45 to 64, and 17.6% who were 65 years of age or older. The median age was 39.6 years. For every 100 females, there were 95.3 males, and for every 100 females age 18 and over there were 92.8 males age 18 and over.

There were 7,131 housing units at an average density of 341.5 units per square mile (131.9 units/km^{2}), of which 6,726 (94.3%) were occupied. Of these, 59.7% were owner-occupied, and 40.3% were occupied by renters. The homeowner vacancy rate was 1.0% and the rental vacancy rate was 4.6%; 5.7% of housing units were vacant.

=== Income and poverty ===
In 2023, the US Census Bureau estimated that the median household income was $66,096, and the per capita income was $35,533. About 7.6% of families and 14.8% of the population were below the poverty line.

=== 2010 census ===
The 2010 United States census reported that McKinleyville had a population of 15,177. The population density was 722.2 inhabitants per square mile (278.8/km^{2}). The racial makeup of McKinleyville was 13,010 (85.7%) White, 103 (0.7%) African American, 700 (4.6%) Native American, 211 (1.4%) Asian, 17 (0.1%) Pacific Islander, 338 (2.2%) from other races, and 798 (5.3%) from two or more races. Hispanic or Latino of any race were 1,081 persons (7.1%).

The Census reported that 15,098 people (99.5% of the population) lived in households, 79 (0.5%) lived in non-institutionalized group quarters, and 0 (0%) were institutionalized.

There were 6,283 households, out of which 1,979 (31.5%) had children under the age of 18 living in them, 2,784 (44.3%) were opposite-sex married couples living together, 691 (11.0%) had a female householder with no husband present, 386 (6.1%) had a male householder with no wife present. There were 619 (9.9%) unmarried opposite-sex partnerships, and 58 (0.9%) same-sex married couples or partnerships. 1,731 households (27.6%) were made up of individuals, and 515 (8.2%) had someone living alone who was 65 years of age or older. The average household size was 2.40. There were 3,861 families (61.5% of all households); the average family size was 2.94.

The population was spread out, with 3,452 people (22.7%) under the age of 18, 1,349 people (8.9%) aged 18 to 24, 4,306 people (28.4%) aged 25 to 44, 4,189 people (27.6%) aged 45 to 64, and 1,881 people (12.4%) who were 65 years of age or older. The median age was 36.3 years. For every 100 females, there were 95.9 males. For every 100 females age 18 and over, there were 93.6 males.

There were 6,565 housing units at an average density of 312.4 units per square mile (120.6 units/km^{2}), of which 6,283 were occupied, of which 3,770 (60.0%) were owner-occupied, and 2,513 (40.0%) were occupied by renters. The homeowner vacancy rate was 1.1%; the rental vacancy rate was 2.7%. 9,459 people (62.3% of the population) lived in owner-occupied housing units and 5,639 people (37.2%) lived in rental housing units.

== Governance ==
McKinleyville is an unincorporated community served by the County of Humboldt and the McKinleyville Community Services District.

In the state legislature, McKinleyville is in the 2nd senatorial district, represented by Democrat Mike McGuire, and the 2nd Assembly district, represented by Democrat Chris Rogers.

Federally, McKinleyville is in California's 2nd congressional district, represented by Democrat Jared Huffman.

== Transportation ==
=== Road ===
U.S. Route 101 extends north and south through the community. The route lies to the west of the majority of the community and bisects a small portion of the area. State Route 299 connects to U.S. Route 101 at the northern end of the nearby city of Arcata. State Route 299 begins at that point and extends easterly to serve as the major traffic artery to the east for the community of McKinleyville. State Route 200 also falls within the area, on the southernmost area of the city, letting drivers get to SR 299 without needing to get to US 101.

At times, vehicle traffic into and out of McKinleyville has been restricted due to landslides on the U.S. routes. A magnitude 7.0 earthquake on November 8, 1980, caused a freeway overpass at Tompkins Hill, just south of Eureka, to partially collapse.

=== Public Transportation ===
Humboldt Transit Authority (HTA) is the major provider of public bus transportation in McKinleyville and the county. HTA has several stops in McKinleyville. Dial-A-Ride service is available from Humboldt Senior Resource Center through an application process, and ticket strips can be purchased at the McKinleyville Senior Center.

==== Hammond Trail ====
The Hammond Trail consists of over 5 miles (8 km) of hiking, biking, and equestrian trails linking Arcata, McKinleyville, and the surrounding areas. Following the historic Hammond Lumber Company railroad grade, the trail begins at the Hammond Bridge – which crosses the Mad River near the Mad River County Park – and extends north to Clam Beach County Park just south of Little River State Beach. There is an overnight campground at Clam Beach County Park.

The Hammond Trail is also a recreation and transportation corridor traveling through rural and suburban areas of Humboldt County and is a part of both the California Coastal Trail (CCT) and the Pacific Coast Bike Route (PCBR).

=== Aviation ===
The Arcata–Eureka Airport is a full-service airport located in McKinleyville. The name of the airport comes from the names of the primary population centers that it serves. The location of this airport was chosen to serve as an experimental field to test landing during heavy fog conditions. Due to weather patterns and geographic conditions, the area is one of the foggiest in Northern California.

== Amenities ==
- Clam Beach Run
- Pony Express Days (known temporarily as the Azalea Festival from 2005 to 2008)

Parks in McKinleyville include Azalea State Reserve, Pierson Park, Hiller Park and Clam Beach County Park.

The beach at Clam Beach County Park was named California's most polluted beach in a 2017 study by an environmental nonprofit.

== Notable person ==
- John Jaso, Major League Baseball catcher
