= Mad River (California) =

River in California, United States

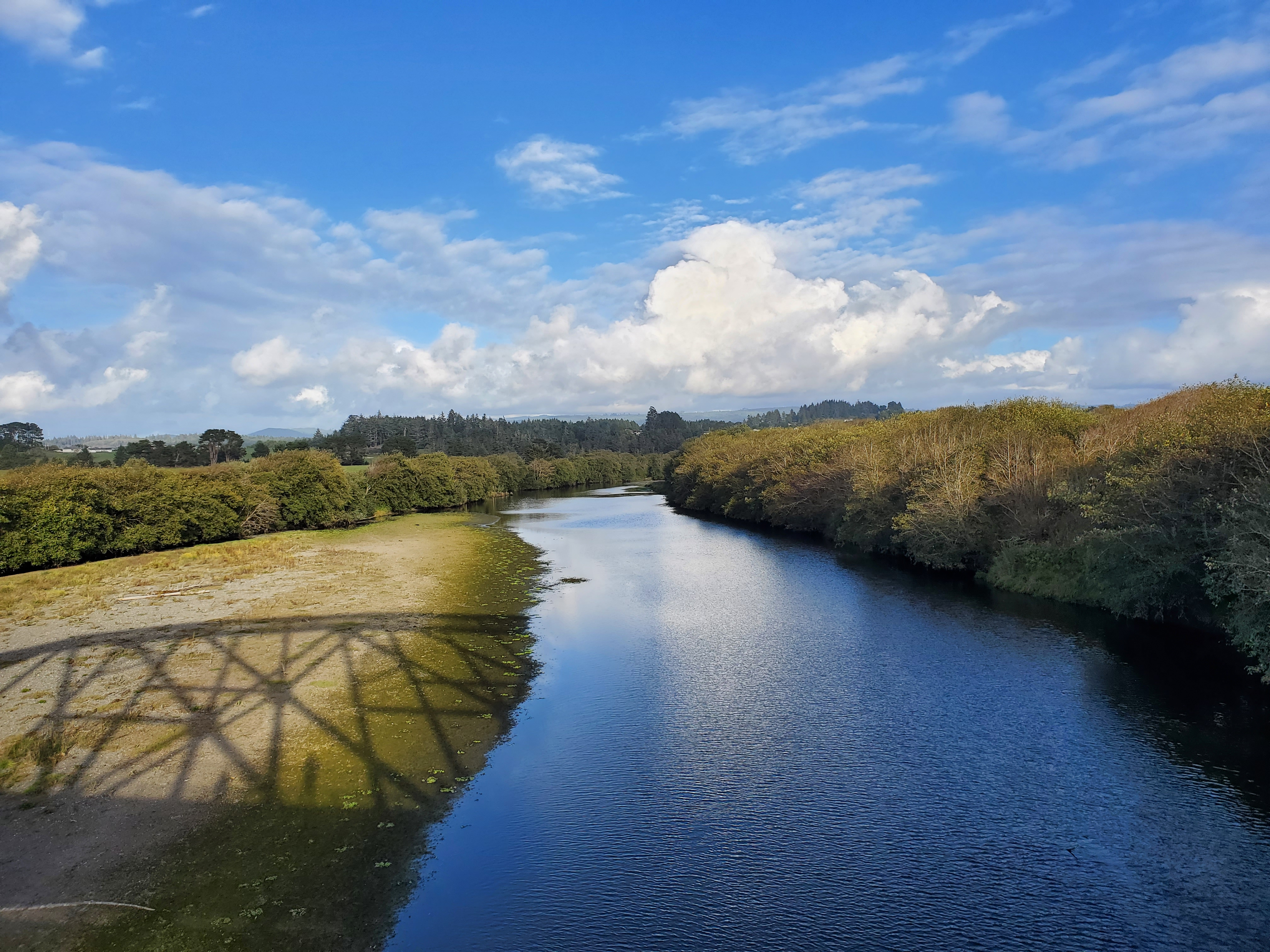
- The Mad River about 4 miles (6.4 km) above the mouth

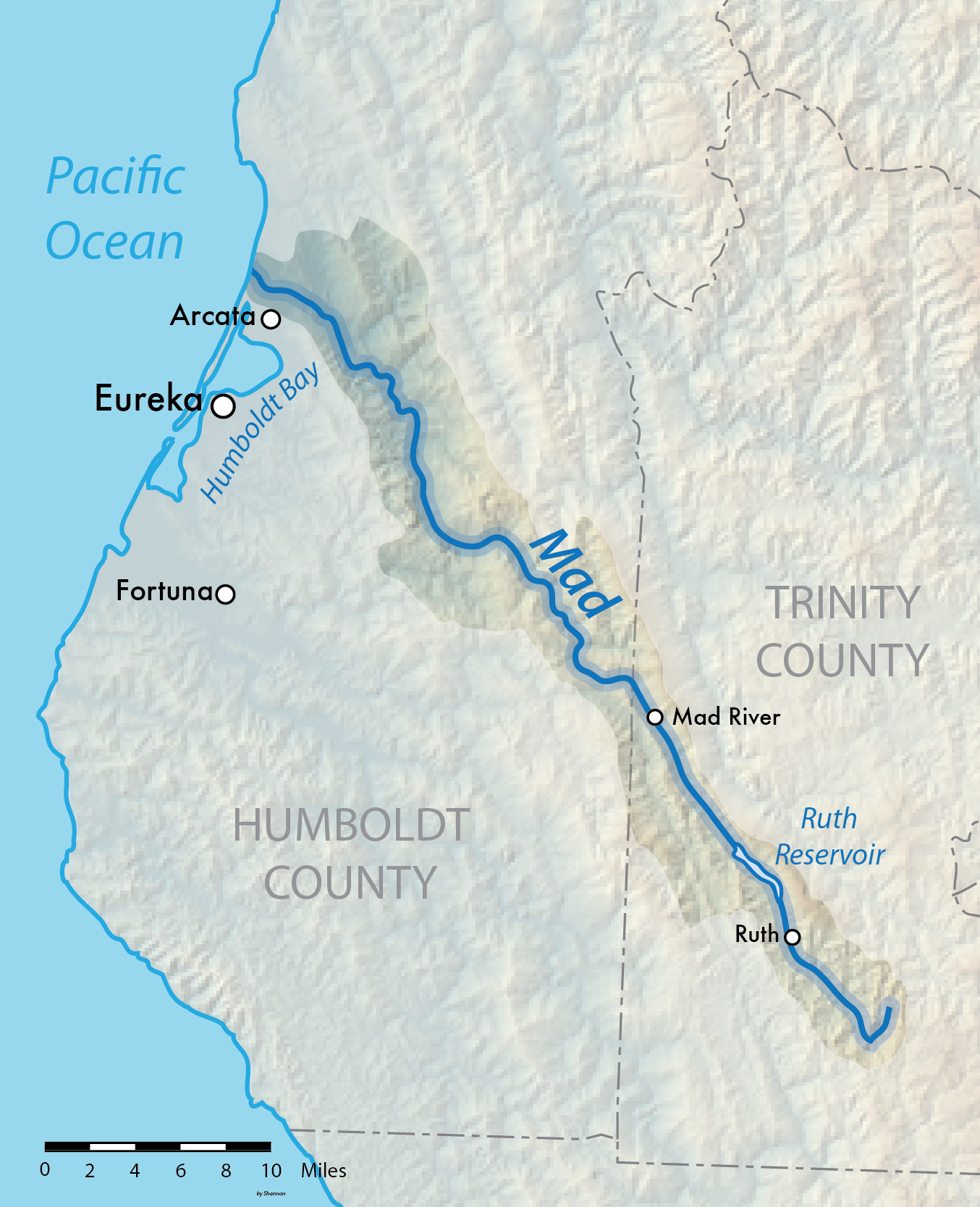
- Map of the Mad River watershed

Location
- Country: United States
- State: California
- Counties: Humboldt, Trinity
- City: McKinleyville

Physical characteristics
- Source
  - location: Klamath Mountains
  - coordinates: 40°12′20″N 123°9′23″W
  - elevation: 4,845 ft (1,477 m)
- Mouth: Pacific Ocean
  - coordinates: 40°56′31″N 124°8′6″W
  - elevation: 0 ft (0 m)
- Length: 113 mi (182 km)
- Basin size: 497 sq mi (1,290 km^{2})
- Discharge
  - location: McKinleyville
  - average: 1,573 cu ft/s (44.5 m^{3}/s)
  - minimum: 17 cu ft/s (0.48 m^{3}/s)
  - maximum: 81,000 cu ft/s (2,300 m^{3}/s)

Basin features
- Tributaries
  - left: South Fork Mad River, Blue Slide Creek, Littlefield Creek
  - right: Barry Creek, Pilot Creek, Bug Creek, Graham Creek, Boulder Creek, Maple Creek, Canõn Creek, North Fork Mad River, Lindsay Creek, Mill Creek

The Mad River (Wiyot: Baduwa't) is a river in upper Northern California. It flows for 113 miles (182 km) in a roughly northwest direction through Trinity County and then Humboldt County, draining a 497-square-mile (1,290 km^{2}) watershed into the Pacific Ocean north of the city of Arcata near Arcata–Eureka Airport in McKinleyville. The river's headwaters are in the Coast Range near South Kelsey Ridge.

== History ==
Before Euro-American settlers arrived in the mid-1800s, the native peoples occupying the lower Mad River watershed were the Wiyot (from approximately Blue Lake to its mouth, plus the greater Humboldt Bay region) who spoke a dialect affiliated with the Algonquian language family, with upriver reaches controlled by three different groups whose languages are related to the Athabascan family, the Whilkut, Nongatl and Lassik (Baumhoff 1958). Today, among these distinct groups, only the Wiyot-affiliated Blue Lake Rancheria and the Wiyot Tribe of the Table Bluff Reservation are federally recognized tribes and the United States holds lands in trust for their citizens. The Whilkut, Nongatl and Lassik were essentially annihilated during the Bald Hills War in the 1860s. The river was named in December, 1849 in memory of an incident when Dr. Josiah Gregg lost his temper when his exploration party did not wait for him at the river mouth.

== Watershed and river modifications ==
The Mad River drains approximately 497 square miles (1,290 km^{2}) of the Coast Range Geomorphic Province and empties into the Pacific Ocean north of Humboldt Bay in Humboldt County, California. The basin is about 100 miles (160 km) in length and averages six miles (10 km) wide. Elevations range from sea level at the mouth to 3,000 feet (910 m) along the western ridge to 6,000 feet (1,800 m) in the headwaters. Principal tributaries to the Mad River include South Fork Mad River, North Fork Mad River, Barry Creek, Pilot Creek, Deer Creek, Bug Creek, Graham Creek, Grace Flat, Blue Slide Creek, Boulder Creek, Maple Creek, Cañon Creek, Lindsey Creek, and Mill (Hall) Creek.

The river provides groundwater recharge for agricultural water supplies and is free-flowing for 85 percent of its length. Matthews Dam, about one third of the way down the river from its source, forms Ruth Reservoir. The dam is owned by Humboldt Bay Municipal Water District, which provides water from Ranney collectors near Essex for municipal and industrial use in Eureka, Arcata, Blue Lake and numerous unincorporated communities in the Humboldt Bay area. The reservoir can hold 48,000 acre-feet (59,000,000 m^{3}) of water; and releases power a two megawatt hydro-electric plant generating 5 million kwh during an average water year.

In the 1960s, a dam for the Mad River in Humboldt County was proposed by the Army Corps of Engineers. The proposed blockage would have flooded the Maple Creek/Butler Valley area and adversely affected the health of the Mad River watershed. Gradually the opposition from the community, including the urban areas of the county, forced a suspension of the project schedule and finally the cancellation of the project. The dam was never built.

The greatest problem of the Mad River drainage basin, as for many rivers in this area of the state, is erosion causing excessive sediment buildup in the river and its tributaries. The main causes of the erosion are excessive road building and logging, especially historical logging practices like clear-cutting. In addition, the removal of riparian vegetation (primarily due to conversion of natural lands to ranching purposes) increases erosion and urbanization causes decreased water quality. In 1992, the Environmental Protection Agency listed the Mad River under section 303(d) of the California Clean Water Act Section as sediment impaired, due to elevated erosion and siltation. In 2006, the river was additionally listed as temperature and turbidity-impaired.

== Land use ==
The upper half of the river is inside the Six Rivers National Forest, but the vast majority of the river flows through private land, even in the national forest. About 64 percent of the land is used for timber production. Green Diamond is by far the largest landowner in the watershed, with about 42 percent of all land. The next largest landowners are R. Emmerson and Humboldt Redwood Company (formerly the Pacific Lumber Company), with 3 and 2 percent respectively. There are quite a few ranchers and lumber companies that own smaller, but still sizable, parcels. Private residences, open space and parks make up most of the rest.

== Ecology ==
The river provides recreational opportunities and important habitat to fish and wildlife. Flora of the area includes the Mad River fleabane (Erigeron maniopotamicus), a wildflower which was named for the river. Key fish species include coho salmon (Oncorhynchus kisutch), Chinook salmon (O. tshawytscha), and steelhead (O. mykiss), which were federally-listed as threatened in the Mad River in 1997, 1999, and 2000, respectively. Two threatened osmerid species - longfin smelt (Spirinchus thaleichthy) and eulachon (Thaleichthys pacificus) - are also listed as present in the estuarine portion of the Mad River, but have not been observed in recent years.

Before entering the ocean, the river turns abruptly north near the triple junction of the Gorda, North American, and Pacific plates. This bend denotes the usual upper limit of the estuary, although brackish waters can extend as far upstream as Highway 101 during king tides. Although small, this estuary provides nursery habitat for juvenile rockfish (Sebastes melanops, S. rastrelliger) and several species of flatfish, including starry flounder (Platichthys stellatus), English sole (Pleuronectes vetulus), and speckled sanddab (Citharichthys stigmaeus). The estuary also serves as a migration corridor for salmonids and Pacific lamprey (Lampetra tridentata), and as a summer feeding ground for several marine species, including topsmelt (Atherinops affinis) and surf smelt (Hypomesus pretiosis). Pacific staghorn sculpin (Leptocottus armatus) prickly sculpin (Cottus asper), coast range sculpin (C. aleuticus), and Three-spine stickleback (Gasterosteous aculeatus) are present in the estuary year-round. Above the estuary, the Mad River is home to resident coastal cutthroat trout (O. clarki clarki), rainbow trout (O. mykiss irideus), Sacramento sucker (Catostomas occidentalis), and Humboldt sucker (Catostomas occidentalis humboldtianus).

The Mad River Estuary is recognized for protection by the California Bays and Estuaries Policy. The Mad River watershed was described as at carrying capacity with 22 colonies of North American beaver (Castor canadensis) in 1954, from the river mouth to well upstream. These beaver were re-introduced into the North Fork Mad River in 1946, or possibly were migrants from the Little River (Humboldt County). North American river otter (Lontra canadensis) were also numerous.

== See also ==
- List of rivers in California
- Mad River, California - the small community near the western extent of Ruth Lake.
- South Fork Trinity River, which parallels much of the river
