= Whiskeytown Dam =

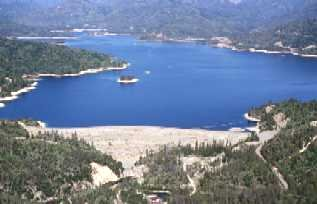
- Interactive map of Whiskeytown Dam
- Location: Shasta County, California, United States
- Coordinates: 40°35′55.8″N 122°32′22.3″W
- Construction began: 1960; 66 years ago
- Opening date: 1963; 63 years ago
- Owner: U.S. Bureau of Reclamation

Dam and spillways
- Type of dam: Embankment
- Impounds: Clear Creek
- Height: 282 ft (86 m)
- Length: 1,228 ft (374 m)
- Spillway type: Glory-hole
- Spillway capacity: 28,650 cu ft/s (811 m^{3}/s)

Reservoir
- Creates: Whiskeytown Lake
- Total capacity: 241,100 acre-feet (297,400 dam^{3})
- Catchment area: 202.5 mi^{2} (524 km^{2})
- Surface area: 3,220 acres (1,300 ha)

Power Station
- Commission date: 1964
- Hydraulic head: 566 ft (173 m)
- Turbines: 2x 90 MW at Spring Creek Powerplant
- Installed capacity: 180 MW
- Annual generation: 274,224,000 KWh

Whiskeytown Dam (officially Clair A. Hill Whiskeytown Dam) is an earthfill dam on Clear Creek, a tributary of the Sacramento River in northern California in the United States.

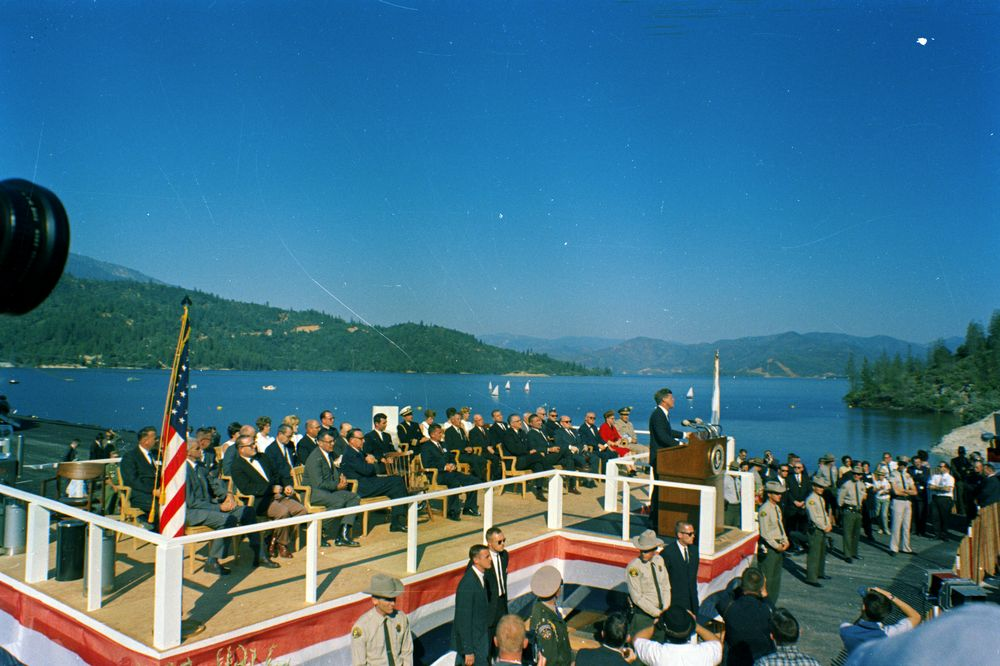
President Kennedy speaks at the dam's dedication on September 28, 1963

It is located about 6 miles (9.7 km) west of Redding, and impounds Whiskeytown Lake on the southern flank of the Trinity Mountains. The dam is 282 feet (86 m) high, with a storage capacity of 241,100 acre-feet (297,400 dam^{3}) of water.

== History ==
The dam was one of the first units built for the Trinity River Division of the Central Valley Project, a Federal water project designed to provide irrigation water to farms in California's Central Valley. Construction started in August 1960 with clearing operations around the dam site, and excavations for the dam's spillway and outlet tunnels began in October. By late 1961, over one-half of the dam's embankment was completed. The dam was topped out on February 7, 1963, and the reservoir was allowed to begin filling with water.

President John F. Kennedy traveled to the site in order to attend the dam's dedication ceremony on September 28, 1963, less than two months before his assassination. He spoke to a crowd of more than 10,000 people.

Water diverted from the Trinity River through the 11-mile (18 km) Clear Creek Tunnel is stored behind Whiskeytown Dam before it is released into the Sacramento River. The water is released to the Sacramento through lower Clear Creek and the Spring Creek Tunnel. The latter furnishes water to the 180 megawatt (MW) Spring Creek Powerplant, which generates about 274 million kilowatt hours (KWh) annually.

In addition, there is a 3.5 MW Power Plant at the base of Whiskeytown dam built in 1986 by the city of Redding. This power plant generates power through the flows that were previously released down Clear Creek through the project's river outlets.

The lake and dam are named after the Gold Rush camp of Whiskeytown, which was submerged in 1963 with the filling of the new reservoir.

== See also ==
- Lewiston Dam
- List of dams and reservoirs in California
- List of United States Bureau of Reclamation dams
- Spring Creek Dam
- Trinity Dam
- Whiskeytown-Shasta-Trinity National Recreation Area
- California Historical Landmarks in Shasta County
- Reading's Bar
