= Trinity Lakes AVA =

Appellation that designates wine in Trinity County, California

Coordinates: 41°02′23″N 122°36′15″W

Trinty Lakes
- Wine region
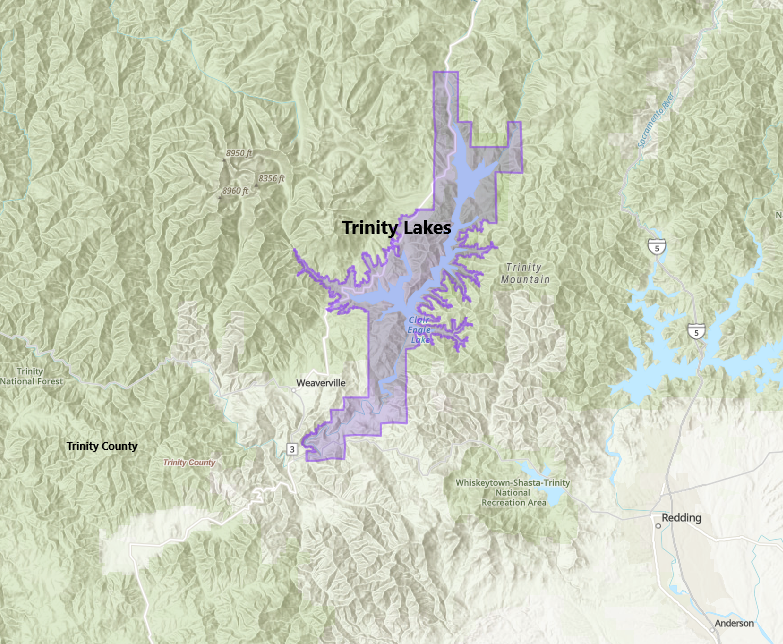
- Type: American Viticultural Area
- Year established: 2005
- Years of wine industry: 45
- Country: [United States
- Part of: California, Trinity County
- Growing season: 175–200 days
- Climate region: Region I-II
- Heat units: 2,992–3,288 GDD units
- Precipitation (annual average): 33.65 in (855 mm)
- Soil conditions: Gravelly coarse sandy loam, deep loam to gravely loam
- Total area: 96,000 acres (150 sq mi)
- Size of planted vineyards: 30 acres (12 ha)
- No. of vineyards: 5
- Grapes produced: Blaufrankisch, Chardonnay, Gewurztraminer, Lemberger, Merlot, Pinot Gris, Pinot Noir and Riesling
- No. of wineries: 2

Trinity Lakes is an American Viticultural Area (AVA) spanning across Trinity County, in north-central California about 65 miles (105 km) south of the Oregon border. It was established as the nation's 132^{nd}, the state's 76^{th} and the county's second appellation on February 27, 2005 by the Alcohol and Tobacco Tax and Trade Bureau (TTB), Treasury after reviewing the petition submitted by Mr. Keith Groves, co-owner of Alpen Cellars Winery and president of the Trinity County Grape Growers Association, to propose a new viticultural area named "Trinity Lakes."
Trinity Lakes viticultural area encompasses the Whiskeytown–Shasta–Trinity National Recreation Area composed of two man-made reservoirs, Trinity Lake and the adjoining smaller Lewiston Lake to its south, and a portion of the Trinity River basin below Lewiston Dam. The area covers about 96,000 acres (150 sq mi), of which 18 percent, 17,285 acres (27 sq mi), is lake surface water, while 1.5 percent, 1,440 acres (580 ha), is suitable land for viticulture. In 2005, 30 acres (12 ha) were cultivated vineyards within the area. Rugged, steep, timbered ridges and narrow agricultural valleys characterize the area. The lakes' daytime cooling and nighttime warming effect moderates the agricultural valleys' climate.
The boundary of the viticultural area begins north of Carrville at Derrick Flat, runs east across the Trinity River, continues south and southwest past Trinity and Lewiston dams and the town of Lewiston, and crosses the Trinity River near the mouth of Neaman Gulch. The boundary then runs north and northeast back past the two dams and the town of Trinity Center, returning to the beginning point at Derrick Flat. Trinity Lakes has two commercial wineries, Alpen Cellars and One Maple cultivating on five vineyards.

== History ==
The majority of the Trinity Lakes viticultural area is located within the Trinity Lake unit of the Whiskeytown-Shasta-Trinity National Recreation Area. This unit includes both Trinity Lake and the smaller Lewiston Lake, and according to the petition, the region surrounding both lakes is commonly known as the Trinity Lakes area. Built in the late 1950s and filled by 1961, the larger man-made lake was originally named Trinity Lake, but later renamed Clair Engle Lake after the sudden death of longtime local resident, politician and United States Senator of California, Clair Engle in 1964. However, area residents still continued to refer to the lake preferring its original name. The petition notes that a grassroots movement sought to revert to the lake's original name and mentioned that Clair Engle Lake road signs often disappeared shortly after being posted. In September 1997, the U.S. Congress and the President made it official with the passage and approval of legislation reverting the reservoir name back to "Trinity Lake."

There is very little historic viticultural data since the reservoir covered the majority of farm land in the Trinity Valley, which for the previous one hundred years had been cattle pasture and hay fields. The Trinity Lakes viticultural area was developed only after the completion of the two man-made lakes in the early 1960s as the climate-modlity study was done for the East Fork Valley in the north end of the Trinity Lake area. It began when Trinity Center native, Keith Groves, who grew up on the family ranch, went to work at his cousin's Fresno winery after graduating from Trinity High School. The job instilled his interest to enroll in Viticulture and Enology at Fresno State. While in school he had to do a feasibility study on a vineyard site and selected the family ranch. No grapes had ever been grown in Trinity County so the presumption was that they couldn't be grown, but Keith's study revealed quite the opposite. The tolerating "lake effect" on the surrounding valleys provided an opportunity to grow wine grapes. This got his father, Mark, interested enough to plant 2 acres (0.81 ha) of wine grapes in 1981. Their efforts became the bonded winery, Alpen Cellars, in 1984, currently cultivating four vineyards on 30 acres (12 ha).

== Terroir ==
=== Topography ===
The Trinity Lake area is characterized by rugged steep timbered ridges dropping into Trinity and Lewiston lakes. The filling of the lakes in the early 1960s left only small narrow valleys uncovered. The narrow valleys are where the plantable ground is, this makes up only about 1.5% of the approximately 96,000 acres (150 sq mi). There now are five commercial vineyards in the boundaries of the area, totaling approximately 30 acres (12 ha) of wine grapes currently being grown. In the narrow valleys the "lake affect" becomes more pronounced because the valleys are so small compared to the large bodies of water this has a moderating affect on the area's temperature. Due to the ruggedness of the area the elevation varies from approximately 1,500 to 4,000 feet (460–1,220 m) above sea level.

=== Climate ===
The Trinity Lake viticultural area's degree days are on the border of a Region I to Region II, depending on the year's season. The "area" has two distinct seasons, a rainy and dry season. The rainy season occurs from November thru May and can be quite cold with an average low temperatures of 27 °F (−3 °C) in December and January. But during the dry season it can be quite warm with average high temperatures of 93 °F (34 °C)} in July and August. The average rainfall is around 44 in (1,100 mm) a year. Because of the mountainous climate, the growing season is relatively short with 175 to 200 days. The key difference to the Trinity Lake area is the large body of water, approximately 2,500,000 acre/ft (3,300,000 ha/m) with a depth of 450 ft (140 m) and approx. 28 miles (45 km) long, which has a cooling affect during the day and a warming affect during the night. As in the Finger Lake's region in New York this area would not be able to grow grapes of equal quality without the "lake affect". Other potential grape growing areas in the County have the same type of mountainous climate but do not have the "lake affect" due to their distance from the lakes. The USDA plant hardiness zones are 8a and 8b.

=== Soils ===
The soils are extremely varied due to the ruggedness of geology in Trinity, the common thread in the farm soils in the area are that they are well drained, alluvial fans in narrow valleys on stream terraces. This is in contrast with other potential grape areas in the county which have wider valley floors, deeper soils with higher clay content, here are the more important farm soils in the area.

- Haysum – This is gravely loam which is well drained to excessively well drained, with zero to 9 percent slopes. The vegetation is mainly White Oak and Ponderosa Pine. Average pH is 6.5.
- Jafa – This is moderately deep soil of loam to gravely loam at it depths. Well drained with zero to 5 percent slopes. The vegetation is Douglas Fir, White Oak and Ponderosa Pine. Average pH is 6.5
- Haploxerolls – Gravelly coarse sandy loam to 60 in (1,500 mm) depth, extremely well drained with zero to 6 percent slope. The vegetation is Douglas Fir, Ponderosa Pine, Sugar Pine. Average pH is 6.1

== Viticulture ==
The earliest vineyard in the area was planted in 1981 at the north end of Trinity Lake by Mark Groves, owner of Alpen Cellars Winery, a small family winery in Trinity Center and the only winery in 2005. According to Groves, just 30 acres (12 ha) are planted with vines in five small vineyards scattered throughout the area. About 1,440 acres (580 ha) are suitable for planting, according to his son, Keith Groves, co-owner of the winery. The high elevation and [cool] climate are particularly suitable for early-maturing vinifera varieties such as Blaufrankisch, Riesling, Gewürtztraminer, Chardonnay, Pinot Noir, Pinot Gris and Merlot. A new commercial winery, One Maple Estate Vineyards & Winery, established in 1998 on the AVA's southeastern edge in Lewiston, opened its winery and tasting room in July 2006.
