= Trinity Dam =

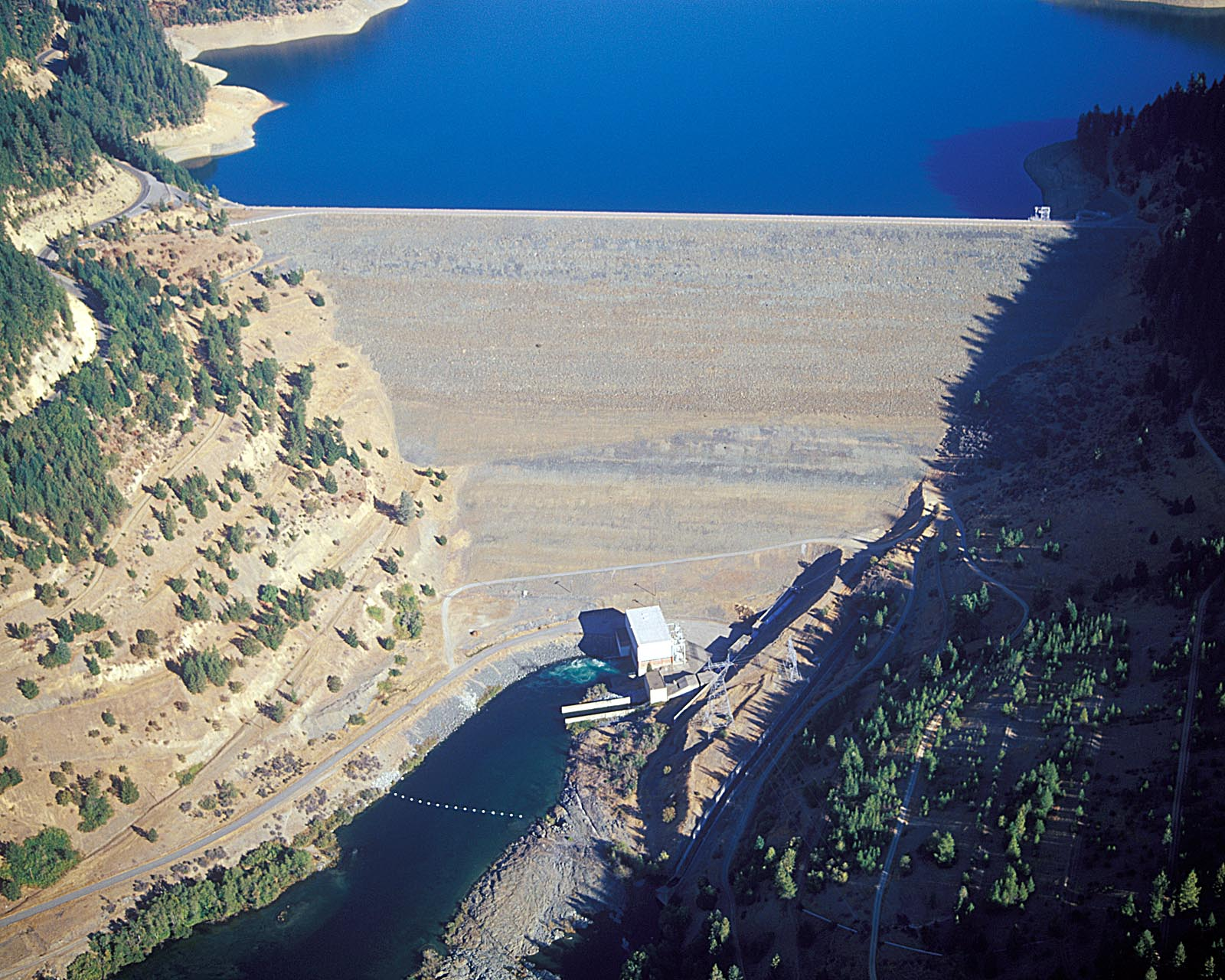
- Interactive map of Trinity Dam
- Country: United States
- Location: Whiskeytown-Shasta-Trinity National Recreation Area, Trinity County, California
- Coordinates: 40°48′04″N 122°45′48″W
- Construction began: 1957; 69 years ago
- Opening date: 1962; 64 years ago
- Owner: U.S. Bureau of Reclamation

Dam and spillways
- Type of dam: Earthfill
- Impounds: Trinity River
- Height: 538 ft (164 m)
- Length: 2,450 ft (750 m)
- Spillway type: Morning glory
- Spillway capacity: 22,400 cu ft/s (630 m^{3}/s)

Reservoir
- Creates: Trinity Lake
- Total capacity: 2,447,650 acre⋅ft (3,019,130 dam^{3})
- Inactive capacity: 400,000 acre⋅ft (490,000 dam^{3})
- Catchment area: 692 mi^{2} (1,790 km^{2})
- Surface area: 17,722 acres (7,172 ha)

Power Station
- Hydraulic head: 426 ft (130 m)
- Turbines: 2x Francis
- Installed capacity: 140 MW
- Annual generation: 424,192,000 kWh (2001–2012)

Trinity Dam is an earthfill dam on the Trinity River located about 7 miles (11 km) northeast of Weaverville, California in the United States. The dam was completed in the early 1960s as part of the federal Central Valley Project to provide irrigation water to the arid San Joaquin Valley.

Standing 538 ft (164 m) high, Trinity Dam forms Trinity Lake – California's third largest reservoir, with a capacity of more than 2,400,000 acre-feet (3,000,000 dam^{3}). The dam includes a hydroelectric plant, and also provides flood control to the Trinity and Klamath river basins.

Below the dam is Lewiston Lake, formed by a second dam, which diverts water through a 10.7 mile tunnel to the Sacramento Valley.

== Background ==
In response to the Great Depression and drought conditions in California during the early 20th century, the United States Congress passed the 1935 Rivers and Harbors Act, which authorized the Central Valley Project (CVP) – a system of dams and canals to provide a stable supply of irrigation water to California's Central Valley. Among the project works was a 1942 proposal to divert water from the Trinity River in northwestern California to augment water supplies in the CVP service area, known as the Trinity River Division. However, the state dropped the Trinity River project from the CVP in 1945.

Six years later, however, the U.S. Bureau of Reclamation (USBR), which was responsible for the construction and operations of most CVP facilities, revived the division, which comprised a system of four dams and two tunnels to capture and store the flow of the Trinity and transport it to the Sacramento River, generating a net surplus of hydroelectric power along the way. Trinity Dam was to be the main storage feature of the division, providing a stable flow to the Lewiston Dam, the diversion point for Trinity River waters into the Central Valley.

== Construction ==
Construction at Trinity Dam began on June 4, 1956 with preliminary excavation and the river was diverted around the dam site on July 8, 1957. Work was bogged down in late 1957 when the river flooded and took out the cofferdam that protected the construction site. However, workers cleared out the dam site by the summer of 1958, and the hiatus also allowed them time to line the diversion tunnel with concrete.

Rock placement began on the main structure as early as 1957, but it was not until 1959 when an 11,000 ft (3,400 m) conveyor belt was incorporated, allowing much faster transport of fill to the dam site. The spillway tunnel was completed in October 1959 and the embankment was topped out in late 1960. The dam's power plant, however, was not finished until December 1963. Trinity stood as the highest earthfill dam in the world until eclipsed by the Oroville Dam, also in California, in 1968. The latter remains the tallest dam in the United States.

As the reservoir filled, it submerged the pioneer towns of Trinity Center, Stringtown and Minersville as well as parts of a historic Northern California stagecoach route. The reservoir was originally named Clair Engle Lake after Clair Engle, a United States senator and major proponent of the CVP. This name was unpopular among local residents, many of whom had watched their homes inundated by the rising waters. By 1995, it had been renamed Trinity Lake.

== Specifications ==
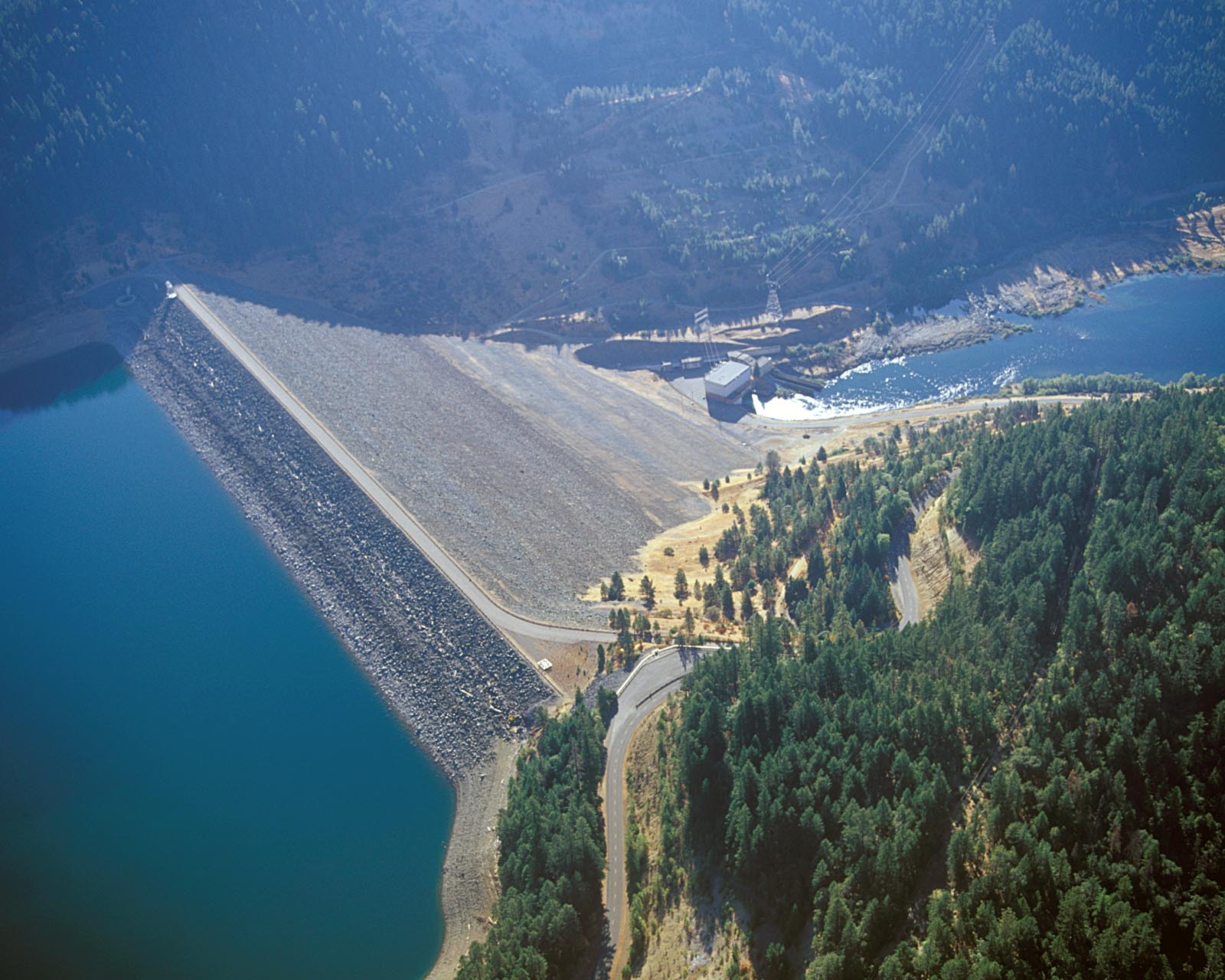
Overview of Trinity Dam complex showing the spillway to the left and powerhouse in right center

Trinity Dam is an earth and rock-filled dam composed mainly of river gravel and local rock, rising 538 ft (164 m) from its foundations and 440 ft (130 m) above the riverbed. The dam's crest is 2,450 ft (750 m) long and 2,395 ft (730 m) above sea level. High water releases are controlled by three different sets of gates. The outlet works have a capacity of 24,000 cu ft/s (680 m^{3}/s), and the service spillway, a morning-glory (bell-mouth) design, can take 22,400 cu ft/s (630 m^{3}/s) of water. The dam's auxiliary spillway has a capacity of 2,250 cu ft/s (64 m^{3}/s).

Trinity Lake can hold up to 2,447,650 acre-feet (3,019,130 dam^{3}) at full pool, and encompasses up to 17,722 acres (7,172 ha) of water. Trinity Powerplant, located at the base of the dam, has two Francis turbines with a capacity of 140 megawatts (MW) combined, uprated from an original capacity of 100 MW. The plant generates an average of 358.97 million kilowatt hours (kWh) and has a low capacity factor, which means it operates mainly on a peaking basis.

== Salmon hatchery ==
Trinity Dam forms an impassable barrier for migrating salmon in the Trinity River, but along with other division facilities has also had adverse impacts on salmon habitat in the lower reaches of the river. Within ten years of the dam's completion, more than three-quarters of Trinity River water was being diverted to the Central Valley each year, and the little flow left in the river was warm, shallow and less suitable for spawning salmon. In addition, the dam blocks the Trinity River's annual floods and sediment loads, leading to degradation in the gravel bars that are vital for salmon habitat.

In response to declining salmon populations, the USBR built the Trinity River Fish Hatchery. The hatchery is operated by the California Department of Fish and Game and has a capacity of 40 million eggs. In 1992, Congress passed the Central Valley Project Improvement Act, which established a minimum annual release of 340,000 acre-feet (420,000 dam^{3}) into the lower Trinity River.

Also, below the Trinity Dam, is the Lewiston Dam (California) in which that water is sent to other water customers that live throughout the State. This is important because this requires the help of two dams just to move water from the reservoir to the customers that require water for either agriculture or urban uses.

== Recreation ==
With 145 miles (233 km) of shoreline, Trinity Lake is a popular summer destination for Northern California residents. Since 1965, the lake has been part of the Trinity Unit of the Whiskeytown-Shasta-Trinity National Recreation Area. The lake has been developed with boat ramps and marinas, most of which are concentrated in the Stuart Fork arm in the southwest and around the resort town of Trinity Center near the north end of the reservoir.

== See also ==
- List of dams and reservoirs in California
- List of largest reservoirs of California
- List of power stations in California
- List of the tallest dams in the United States
