= Helena Fire =

2017 wildfire in Northern California

- Part of the 2017 California wildfires
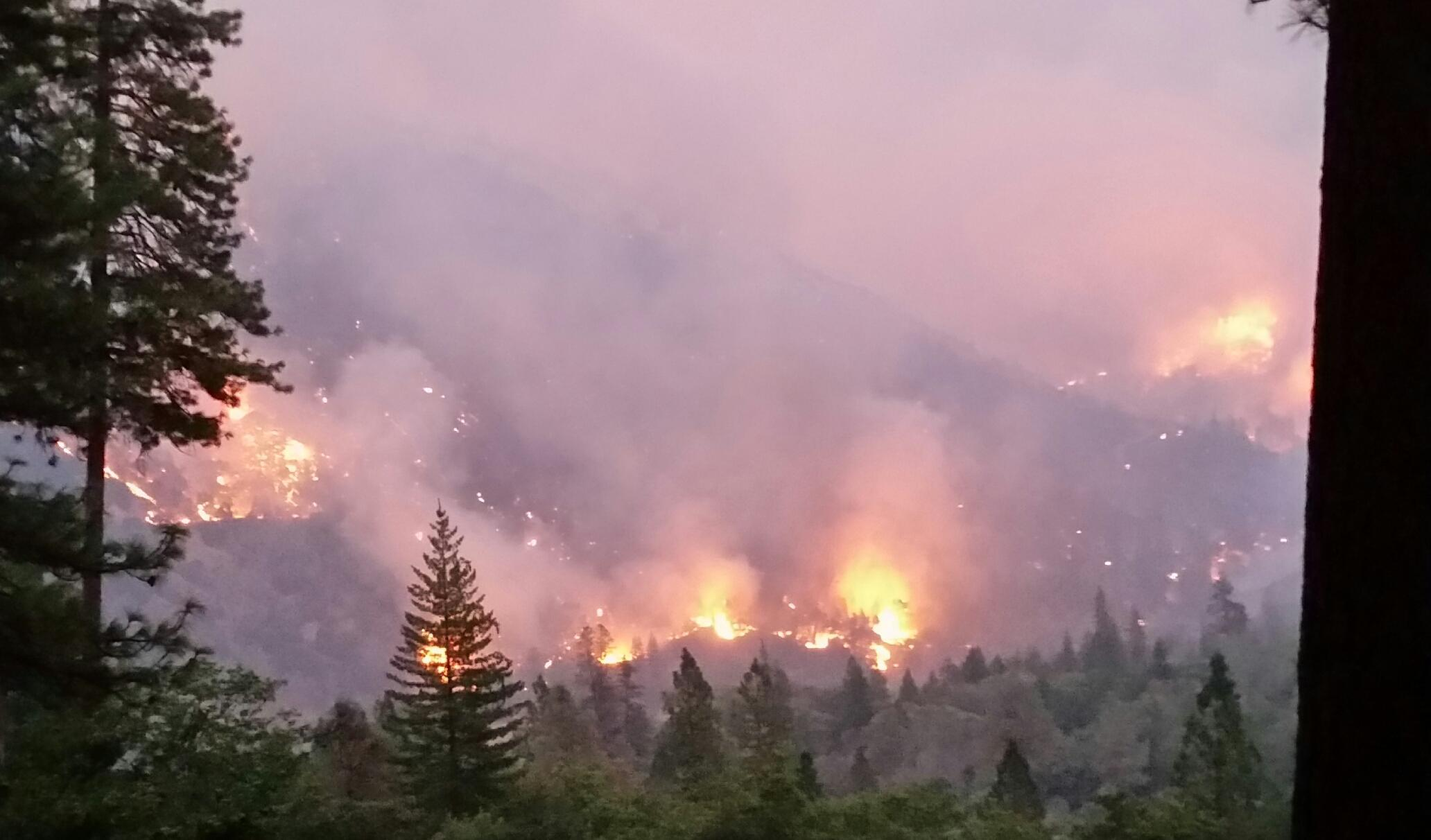
- Helena Fire on September 6, 2017
- Date: August 30, 2017 –; November 15, 2017
- Location: Helena, California, United States; Westerville, California, United States; Trinity Alps Wilderness, California, United States
- Coordinates: 40.779°N 123.102°W

Statistics
- Burned area: 21,846 acres (88 km^{2})

Impacts
- Structures lost: 133

Ignition
- Cause: Tree falling on power line

Map
- Location of fire in California.

The Helena Fire was a wildfire that burned for over 75 days in 2017 in Trinity Alps Wilderness and west of the town of Weaverville, Trinity County, California in the United States. The fire burned 21,846 acres (88 km^{2}), and destroyed 72 homes. The fire merged with the nearby Fork Fire (3,484 acres (14 km^{2})). The Helena Fire was fully extinguished on November 15, after spreading over 21,846 acres (88 km^{2}). The cause of the fire was a tree falling on a Trinity Public Utilities District power line. The fire threatened the communities of Weaverville and Junction City and impacted recreational activities in the area.

== Progression ==
The Helena Fire was first reported on August 30, 2017, at 5:20 pm near the town of Helena, California, along California State Route 299. The cause of the fire was a tree falling into a power line. It was fueled by brush, timber and hardwood litter, with excessive heat helping to strengthen the fire.

On September 3, the fire was reported to be growing to the northeast and southwest, threatening infrastructure in Junction City, California. Crews constructed firelines from Junction City to Glennison Gap. The fire had expanded to Brock Gulch and along Brock Road. It had also expanded into the Trinity Alps Wilderness.

As of the morning of September 4, the fire was burning along California State Route 299 and on both sides of the Trinity River. The fire had destroyed 72 homes and 61 outbuildings. The Helena Fire had burned 8,940 acres (36 km^{2}) and was at 14% containment. That day, a spot fire broke out east of Weaver Bally Lookout.

The fire expanded to 11,013 acres (45 km^{2}) by the morning of September 5, remaining at 14% containment. Heavy smoke has been identified as creating a challenge at determining the perimeter of the fire, which is currently burning near Junction City and Weaverville. The Helena Fire moved into the Miller Creek drainage on southern, southwest flank of the Trinity River. Containment lines from the 2008 Iron and Eagle Fires were being used to control the fire.

On November 15, it was reported that the Helena Fire had been fully extinguished.

== Effects ==
=== Evacuations and closures ===
Portions of the Shasta-Trinity National Forest were closed, including to hunters.

Bureau of Land Management's Junction City Campground, Bagdad River Access on Highway 299, Pigeon Campground, and the Grapevine Swimming Hole were closed.

=== Environmental impacts ===
The smoke from the Helena Fire settled over Sacramento, California, creating unhealthy breathing conditions. Trinity Alps Unified School District, Douglas City Elementary School District, and Klamath Trinity Joint Unified School District canceled school on September 5 due to unhealthy air conditions with schools resuming on September 11.

=== Insurance ===
Trinity Public Utilities District had been insured against fires started from its power lines by a California state agency, the Special District Risk Management Authority. But three years after the wildfire, the agency told the utility company that it would no longer cover that policy. No other insurance company would offer Trinity that insurance. A future wildfire sourced to Trinity's power lines may bankrupt the utility.

== See also ==
- 2017 California wildfires
