= North Fork Trinity River =

Location
- Country: United States
- State: California
- City: Helena

Physical characteristics
- Source: Rays Peak and Chikoot Pass
  - location: Trinity National Forest
  - coordinates: 41°04′24″N 123°09′54″W
  - elevation: 5,700 ft (1,700 m)
- Mouth: Trinity River
  - location: Helena
  - coordinates: 40°46′14″N 123°07′39″W
  - elevation: 1,358 ft (414 m)
- Length: 25 mi (40 km)
- Basin size: 151 mi^{2} (390 km^{2})
- Discharge
  - location: Helena, CA
  - average: 431 cu ft/s (12.2 m^{3}/s)
  - minimum: 7.5 cu ft/s (0.21 m^{3}/s)
  - maximum: 35,800 cu ft/s (1,010 m^{3}/s)

Basin features
- Tributaries
  - left: Grizzly Creek, East Fork North Fork Trinity River

National Wild and Scenic River
- Designated: January 19, 1981

The North Fork Trinity River is a tributary of the Trinity River in the U.S. state of California. It flows south through the Klamath Mountains for about 25 miles (40 km), emptying into the Trinity at Helena, about 5 miles (8.0 km) northeast of Junction City. The river drains an area of 151 square miles (390 km^{2}). Important tributaries include the East Fork North Fork Trinity River and Grizzly Creek.
