= Lewiston Elementary School District =

School district in California, United States

Location
- 685 Lewiston Rd. Lewiston, California 96052 United States

Other information
- Website: lewistonesd.com

Lewiston Elementary School District is a public school district based in Trinity County, California, United States.
