= Helena, California =

Unincorporated community in California, United States

Helena, California 'ak'iče (Chimariko)
- Ghost town
- Location within California
- Coordinates: 40°46′25″N 123°07′42″W
- Country: United States
- State: California
- County: Trinity
- Elevation: 1,391 ft (424 m)
- Time zone: UTC-8 (Pacific (PST))
  - Summer (DST): UTC-7 (PDT)
- Area code: 530
- GNIS feature ID: 261237
- Helena Historic District
- U.S. National Register of Historic Places
- Location: California
- Nearest city: Junction City, California
- Architectural style: Various; Southwestern U.S. frontier-style, late-19th to early-20th century.
- NRHP reference No.: 84001219

Significant dates
- Added to NRHP: May 24, 1984
- Designated: May 24, 1984

Helena is a ghost town in unincorporated Trinity County, California, United States. It is located on the North Fork of the Trinity River, 10 miles (16 km) west-northwest of Weaverville. State Route 299 runs right past the former town to the south; East Fork Road connects the highway to Helena.

== History ==
The community was settled in 1851 as a mining camp on the site of the Chimariko village of 'ak'iče. It was known as Bagdad, North Fork, and The Cove before its post office opened in 1891; the post office was named Helena after the postmaster Mr. Meckel's wife to avoid confusion with another California community called North Fork.

John and Christian Meckel, who moved to the area and established a home on a group of mining claims that totaled 160 acres. In 1854, the Meckels opened a general merchandise store and later a hotel. The town was first known as North Fork, but it was popularly known as “Baghdad,” a name given to the settlement reportedly because it was as rowdy and bizarre as the ancient city with the same name on the Tigris River.

In 1859 the Meckel brothers built and operated a brewery in Helena, then called North Fork.

In 1923, the final stretch of road was built from Helena to South Fork, which connects it to the coast.

When the gold mining dried up, the town soon followed, with slight upticks during the Great Depression. When State Route 299 was completed in 1931, it ended the necessity of the town as it was now being bypassed. The entire town was then bought by F. I. DiNapoli in 1966 for $50,000.

In 1984, Helena was added to the National Register of Historical Places.

== Current status ==
Today, Helena is abandoned and owned by the trustee of a deceased businessman from San Jose. The Currie Cottage (1859), the Meckel Store (1858), the Shlomer Brick Building (1859), The Shlomer Feed Stable (1860), the Meckel Barn (1860), and a rental building built in the 1930s remain.

== See also ==
- Helena Fire
- List of ghost towns in California
- National Register of Historic Places listings in Trinity County, California
