= Junction City Elementary School District =

School district in California, United States

Location
- 430 Red Hill Rd. Junction City, California 96048 United States

Other information
- Website: tcoek12.org

Junction City Elementary School District is a public school district based in Trinity County, California, United States.

== See also ==
- Junction City, California
