= Trinity Center Airport =

- IATA: none; ICAO: none; FAA LID: O86

Summary
- Airport type: Public
- Operator: Trinity County
- Location: Trinity Center, California
- Elevation AMSL: 2,390 ft / 728.5 m
- Coordinates: 40°59′0″N 122°41′39″W
- Interactive map of Trinity Center Airport

Runways
Direction	Length		Surface
Direction	ft	m	Surface
14/32	3,215	980	Asphalt

Trinity Center Airport (FAA LID: O86) is a public airport located in Trinity Center, serving Trinity County, California, USA. This general aviation airport covers 55 acres and has one runway.
