= Trinity Village, California =

Trinity Village
- census-designated place
- Position in California.
- Coordinates: 40°52′27″N 123°30′42″W
- Country: United States
- State: California
- County: Trinity

Area
  - Total: 4.014 sq mi (10.395 km^{2})
  - Land: 4.014 sq mi (10.395 km^{2})
  - Water: 0 sq mi (0 km^{2}) 0%
- Elevation: 1,289 ft (393 m)

Population (2020)
  - Total: 278
  - Density: 69.3/sq mi (26.7/km^{2})
- Time zone: UTC-8 (Pacific (PST))
  - Summer (DST): UTC-7 (PDT)
- ZIP code: 95563
- Area code: 530
- GNIS feature ID: 2611452

Trinity Village is a census-designated place (CDP) in Trinity County, California, United States. Trinity Village sits at an elevation of 1,289 feet (393 m). Its population is 278 as of the 2020 census, down from 297 from the 2010 census.

== Geography ==
According to the United States Census Bureau, the CDP covers an area of 4.0 square miles (10.4 km^{2}), all land.

== Demographics ==
The 2020 United States census reported that Trinity Village had a population of 278. The population density was 69.3 inhabitants per square mile (26.8/km^{2}). The racial makeup of Trinity Village was 221 (79.5%) White, 0 (0.0%) African American, 13 (4.7%) Native American, 5 (1.8%) Asian, 3 (1.1%) Pacific Islander, 9 (3.2%) from other races, and 27 (9.7%) from two or more races. Hispanic or Latino of any race were 21 persons (7.6%).

The whole population lived in households. There were 137 households, out of which 26 (19.0%) had children under the age of 18 living in them, 38 (27.7%) were married-couple households, 11 (8.0%) were cohabiting couple households, 39 (28.5%) had a female householder with no partner present, and 49 (35.8%) had a male householder with no partner present. 74 households (54.0%) were one person, and 36 (26.3%) were one person aged 65 or older. The average household size was 2.03. There were 57 families (41.6% of all households).

The age distribution was 47 people (16.9%) under the age of 18, 2 people (0.7%) aged 18 to 24, 49 people (17.6%) aged 25 to 44, 89 people (32.0%) aged 45 to 64, and 91 people (32.7%) who were 65 years of age or older. The median age was 57.5 years. For every 100 females, there were 133.6 males.

There were 245 housing units at an average density of 61.1 units per square mile (23.6 units/km^{2}), of which 137 (55.9%) were occupied. Of these, 97 (70.8%) were owner-occupied, and 40 (29.2%) were occupied by renters.

== Politics ==
In the state legislature, Trinity Village is in the 2nd senatorial district, represented by Democrat Mike McGuire, and the 2nd Assembly district, represented by Democrat Chris Rogers.

Federally, Trinity Village is in California's 2nd congressional district, represented by Democrat Jared Huffman.
