= Lewiston Dam (California) =

Dam in Trinity County, California, United States

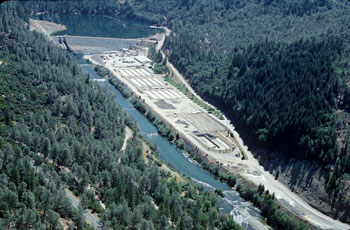
- Official name: Lewiston Dam
- Location: Trinity County, California, United States
- Coordinates: 40°43′30″N 122°47′46″W
- Opening date: 1963; 62 years ago
- Operator(s): US Bureau of Reclamation

Dam and spillways
- Impounds: Trinity River
- Height: 91 ft (28 m)
- Length: 745 ft (227 m)

Reservoir
- Creates: Lewiston Lake
- Total capacity: 14,660 acre-feet (18,080 dam^{3})
- Catchment area: 718 sq mi (1,860 km^{2})
- Surface area: 759 acres (307 ha)

Power Station
- Installed capacity: 350 KW
- Annual generation: 3,335,000 KWh

Lewiston Dam is an earthfill dam on the Trinity River that forms Lewiston Lake near Weaverville, California, United States. The 91 ft (28 m) high earthfill dam is 7 mi (11 km) downstream of Trinity Dam and was built by the U.S. Bureau of Reclamation. Construction was completed in 1963. Lewiston Lake and Dam are part of the Central Valley Project, which harnesses the waters from the Sacramento River and San Joaquin River watersheds to irrigate the Central Valley, and provide hydroelectricity.

== See also ==
- List of dams and reservoirs in California
