= Lewiston, California =

- census-designated place
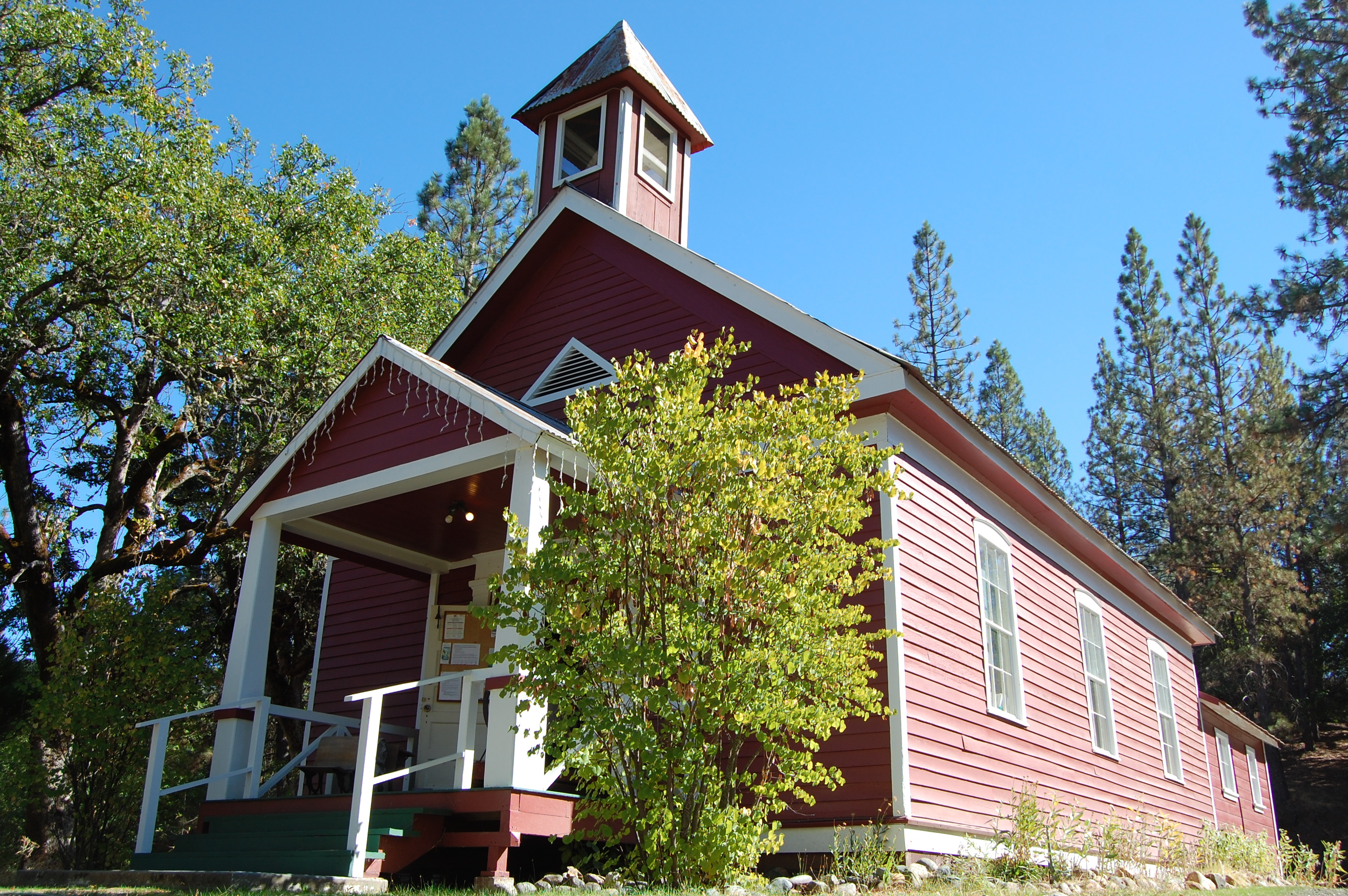
- Lewiston Schoolhouse, in the Lewiston Historic District, is now a library

- Location in Trinity County and the state of California

- Location in the United States
- Coordinates: 40°41′57″N 122°48′38″W
- Country: United States
- State: California
- County: Trinity

Area
  - Total: 20.017 sq mi (51.844 km^{2})
  - Land: 20.017 sq mi (51.844 km^{2})
  - Water: 0 sq mi (0 km^{2}) 0%
- Elevation: 1,814 ft (553 m)

Population (2020)
  - Total: 1,222
  - Density: 61.05/sq mi (23.57/km^{2})
- Time zone: UTC-8 (Pacific (PST))
  - Summer (DST): UTC-7 (PDT)
- ZIP code: 96052
- Area code: 530
- FIPS code: 06-41278
- GNIS feature ID: 0277538

Lewiston is a census-designated place (CDP) in Trinity County, California, United States. Its population is 1,222 as of the 2020 census, up from 1,193 from the 2010 census.

== History ==
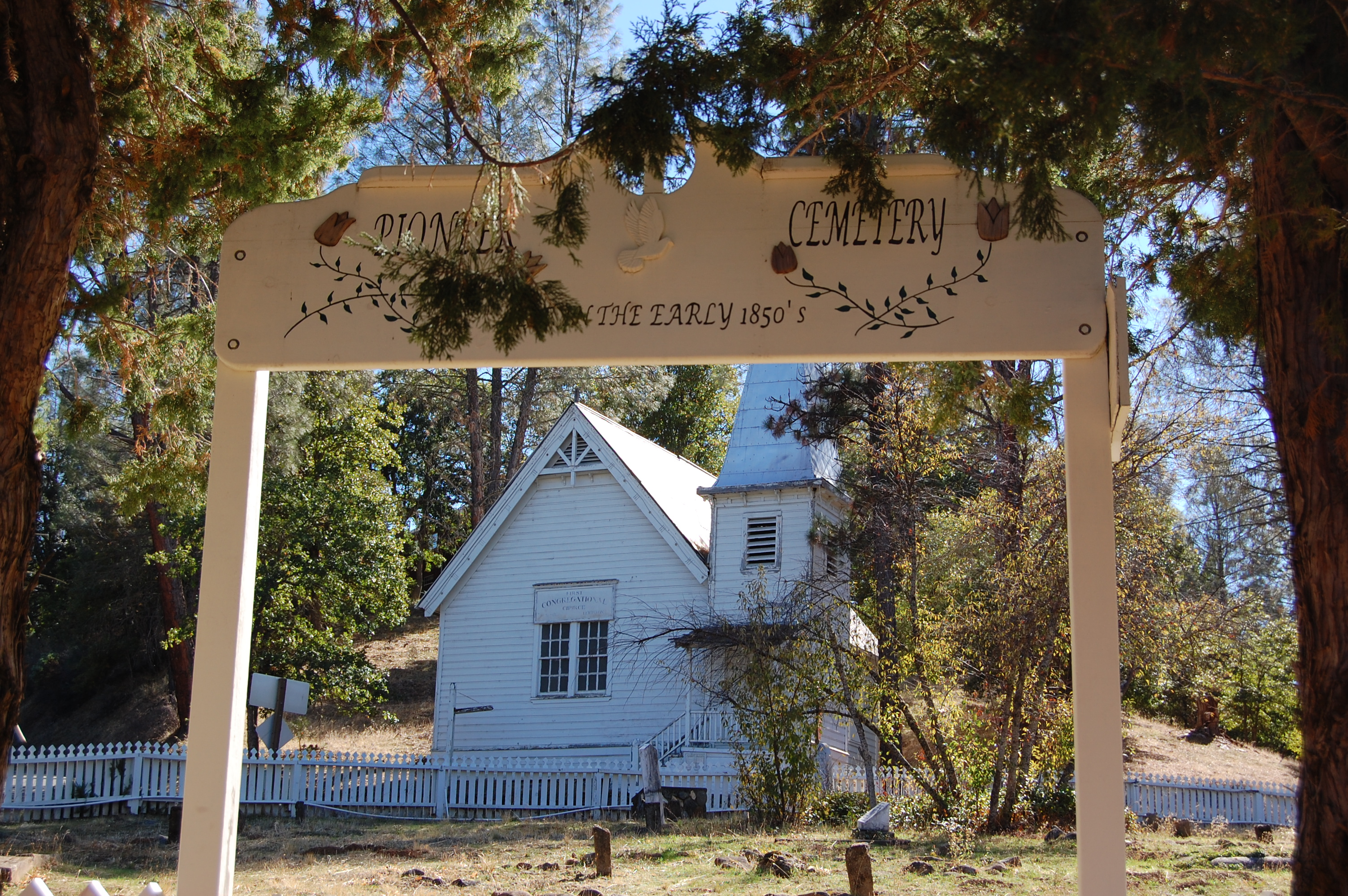
Signage at Lewiston's Pioneer Cemetery dates it to the 1850s

A post office called Lewiston has been in operation since 1854. The community was named after Benjamin Franklin Lewis, adopted son of town founder Tom Palmer, who with Lewis ran a gold mining operation on the Trinity River in the early days of the Gold Rush.

== Geography ==
Lewiston is located at 40°41′57″N 122°48′38″W (40.699213, -122.810684).

According to the United States Census Bureau, the CDP has a total area of 51.8 square kilometers (20.0 sq mi), all land.

=== Climate ===
According to the Köppen Climate Classification system, Lewiston has a hot-summer Mediterranean climate, abbreviated "Csa" on climate maps. It experiences hot summers and cool winters with great diurnal temperature variation.

Climate data for Trinity River Hatchery, California (normals 1981-2010)(extremes 1921-2020)
Month	Jan	Feb	Mar	Apr	May	Jun	Jul	Aug	Sep	Oct	Nov	Dec	Year
Record high °F (°C)	65.0 (18.3)	76.0 (24.4)	84.0 (28.9)	94.0 (34.4)	101.0 (38.3)	109.0 (42.8)	113.0 (45.0)	113.0 (45.0)	108.0 (42.2)	99.0 (37.2)	83.0 (28.3)	67.0 (19.4)	113.0 (45.0)
Mean maximum °F (°C)	57.0 (13.9)	67.0 (19.4)	74.0 (23.3)	85.0 (29.4)	92.0 (33.3)	99.0 (37.2)	104.0 (40.0)	104.0 (40.0)	99.0 (37.2)	89.0 (31.7)	70.0 (21.1)	57.0 (13.9)	106.0 (41.1)
Mean daily maximum °F (°C)	48.0 (8.9)	53.8 (12.1)	59.9 (15.5)	66.1 (18.9)	75.4 (24.1)	84.2 (29.0)	93.0 (33.9)	91.0 (32.8)	86.0 (30.0)	73.4 (23.0)	55.4 (13.0)	46.6 (8.1)	69.5 (20.8)
Daily mean °F (°C)	40.1 (4.5)	43.2 (6.2)	47.7 (8.7)	51.7 (10.9)	59.1 (15.1)	66.2 (19.0)	72.7 (22.6)	71.3 (21.8)	65.4 (18.6)	56.1 (13.4)	45.5 (7.5)	39.2 (4.0)	54.8 (12.7)
Mean daily minimum °F (°C)	32.3 (0.2)	32.7 (0.4)	34.9 (1.6)	37.3 (2.9)	42.9 (6.1)	48.2 (9.0)	52.5 (11.4)	50.8 (10.4)	44.9 (7.2)	38.8 (3.8)	35.5 (1.9)	31.8 (−0.1)	40.2 (4.6)
Mean minimum °F (°C)	24.0 (−4.4)	24.0 (−4.4)	27.0 (−2.8)	29.0 (−1.7)	33.0 (0.6)	39.0 (3.9)	45.0 (7.2)	44.0 (6.7)	37.0 (2.8)	30.0 (−1.1)	26.0 (−3.3)	23.0 (−5.0)	19.0 (−7.2)
Record low °F (°C)	12.0 (−11.1)	10.0 (−12.2)	20.0 (−6.7)	23.0 (−5.0)	27.0 (−2.8)	33.0 (0.6)	37.0 (2.8)	38.0 (3.3)	32.0 (0.0)	20.0 (−6.7)	25.0 (−3.9)	4.0 (−15.6)	4.0 (−15.6)
Average precipitation inches (mm)	5.68 (144)	5.07 (129)	4.21 (107)	2.31 (59)	1.74 (44)	0.80 (20)	0.17 (4.3)	0.22 (5.6)	0.60 (15)	1.90 (48)	4.37 (111)	6.39 (162)	33.46 (850)
Average snowfall inches (cm)	1.6 (4.1)	1.6 (4.1)	0.7 (1.8)	0 (0)	0 (0)	0 (0)	0 (0)	0 (0)	0 (0)	0 (0)	0.5 (1.3)	1.9 (4.8)	6.8 (17)
Average precipitation days (≥ 0.01 in)	14.3	12.4	12.1	8.6	6.6	3.1	1.2	1.3	2.4	5.7	11.4	14.1	93.2
Source: NOAA

== Demographics ==
Historical population
Census	Pop.	Note	%±
1870	338		—
2000	1,305		—
2010	1,193		−8.6%
2020	1,222		2.4%
U.S. Decennial Census; 1850–1870 1880-1890; 1900 1910 1920; 1930 1940 1950; 1960 1970 1980; 1990 2000 2010

=== 2020 census ===
As of the 2020 census, Lewiston had a population of 1,222 and a population density of 61.0 inhabitants per square mile (23.6/km^{2}). The median age was 53.4 years. 17.5% of residents were under the age of 18 and 28.2% of residents were 65 years of age or older. For every 100 females there were 106.8 males, and for every 100 females age 18 and over there were 99.6 males age 18 and over.

The age distribution was 214 people (17.5%) under the age of 18, 56 people (4.6%) aged 18 to 24, 238 people (19.5%) aged 25 to 44, 370 people (30.3%) aged 45 to 64, and 344 people (28.2%) who were 65 years of age or older.

0.0% of residents lived in urban areas, while 100.0% lived in rural areas.

The Census reported that 1,222 people (100% of the population) lived in households. There were 532 households, of which 19.9% had children under the age of 18 living in them. Of all households, 44.5% were married-couple households, 9.2% were cohabiting couple households, 25.6% were households with a male householder and no spouse or partner present, and 20.7% were households with a female householder and no spouse or partner present. About 30.6% of all households were made up of individuals and 15.4% had someone living alone who was 65 years of age or older. The average household size was 2.3, and there were 317 families (59.6% of all households).

There were 643 housing units, of which 17.3% were vacant. There were 532 occupied housing units, of which 388 (72.9%) were owner-occupied and 144 (27.1%) were occupied by renters. The homeowner vacancy rate was 2.3% and the rental vacancy rate was 2.0%.

Racial composition as of the 2020 census
Race	Number	Percent
White	987	80.8%
Black or African American	4	0.3%
American Indian and Alaska Native	39	3.2%
Asian	8	0.7%
Native Hawaiian and Other Pacific Islander	4	0.3%
Some other race	28	2.3%
Two or more races	152	12.4%
Hispanic or Latino (of any race)	70	5.7%

=== Income and poverty ===
In 2023, the US Census Bureau estimated that the median household income in 2023 was $58,125, and the per capita income was $21,945. About 12.9% of families and 17.6% of the population were below the poverty line.

=== 2010 census ===
The 2010 United States census reported that Lewiston had a population of 1,193. The population density was 59.6 inhabitants per square mile (23.0/km^{2}). The racial makeup of Lewiston was 1,074 (90.0%) White, 8 (0.7%) African American, 37 (3.1%) Native American, 6 (0.5%) Asian, 5 (0.4%) Pacific Islander, 21 (1.8%) from other races, and 42 (3.5%) from two or more races. Hispanic or Latino of any race were 78 persons (6.5%).

The Census reported that 1,193 people (100% of the population) lived in households, 0 (0%) lived in non-institutionalized group quarters, and 0 (0%) were institutionalized.

There were 553 households, out of which 112 (20.3%) had children under the age of 18 living in them, 267 (48.3%) were opposite-sex married couples living together, 45 (8.1%) had a female householder with no husband present, 20 (3.6%) had a male householder with no wife present. There were 44 (8.0%) unmarried opposite-sex partnerships, and 3 (0.5%) same-sex married couples or partnerships. 177 households (32.0%) were made up of individuals, and 63 (11.4%) had someone living alone who was 65 years of age or older. The average household size was 2.16. There were 332 families (60.0% of all households); the average family size was 2.70.

The population was spread out, with 202 people (16.9%) under the age of 18, 63 people (5.3%) aged 18 to 24, 212 people (17.8%) aged 25 to 44, 459 people (38.5%) aged 45 to 64, and 257 people (21.5%) who were 65 years of age or older. The median age was 51.4 years. For every 100 females, there were 102.2 males. For every 100 females age 18 and over, there were 100.6 males.

There were 696 housing units at an average density of 34.8 per square mile (13.4/km^{2}), of which 404 (73.1%) were owner-occupied, and 149 (26.9%) were occupied by renters. The homeowner vacancy rate was 3.5%; the rental vacancy rate was 10.2%. 838 people (70.2% of the population) lived in owner-occupied housing units and 355 people (29.8%) lived in rental housing units.

== Government ==
In the California State Legislature, Lewiston is in the 2nd senatorial district, represented by Democrat Mike McGuire, and the 2nd Assembly district, represented by Democrat Chris Rogers.

In the United States House of Representatives, Lewiston is in California's 2nd congressional district, represented by Democrat Jared Huffman.

== Places of interest ==
- Lewiston is home to California's third largest reservoir, the Trinity Dam
- The Trinity River flows through the heart of Lewiston, directly under the Old Lewiston Bridge
- Lewiston Lake is located along Trinity Dam Boulevard and is used primarily as a fishing and camping area, and not commonly used as a swimming destination owing to the frigid water.
- Trinity Lake, located just above Lewiston Lake and Trinity Dam, is a summer-time destination for fishing, camping, boating, and swimming.
