= Post Mountain, California =

- Unincorporated community Census-designated place
- Location within California Location within the United States
- Coordinates: 40°25′22″N 123°13′20″W
- Country: United States
- State: California
- County: Trinity

Area
  - Total: 12.41 sq mi (32.15 km^{2})
  - Land: 12.41 sq mi (32.15 km^{2})
  - Water: 0 sq mi (0.0 km^{2})
- Elevation: 3,264 ft (995 m)

Population (2020)
  - Total: 3,032
  - Density: 244.3/sq mi (94.31/km^{2})
- Time zone: UTC-8 (Pacific (PST))
  - Summer (DST): UTC-7 (PDT)
- ZIP Code: 96041 (Hayfork)
- Area code: 530
- FIPS code: 06-58456
- GNIS feature ID: 2804441

Post Mountain is an unincorporated community and census-designated place (CDP) in Trinity County, California, United States. It is on the north side of California State Route 36, 68 miles (109 km) west of Red Bluff and 69 miles (111 km) east of U.S. Route 101 near Fortuna. Hayfork, the nearest post office, is 14 miles (23 km) to the north on California State Route 3. Its population is 3,032 as of the 2020 census.

== Demographics ==
Historical population
Census	Pop.	Note	%±
2020	3,032		—
U.S. Decennial Census; 1850–1870 1880-1890; 1900 1910 1920; 1930 1940 1950; 1960 1970 1980; 1990 2000 2010; 2020

Post Mountain first appeared as a census designated place in the 2020 U.S. census.

=== 2020 census ===
As of the 2020 census, Post Mountain had a population of 3,032.

The median age was 42.2 years. 12.8% of residents were under the age of 18 and 16.8% were 65 years of age or older. For every 100 females, there were 218.5 males, and for every 100 females age 18 and over, there were 234.3 males age 18 and over.

There were 619 households, of which 35.7% had children under the age of 18 living in them. Of all households, 31.3% were married-couple households, 49.9% were households with a male householder and no spouse or partner present, and 11.6% were households with a female householder and no spouse or partner present. About 16.3% of all households were made up of individuals, and 5.5% had someone living alone who was 65 years of age or older.

There were 657 housing units, of which 5.8% were vacant. The homeowner vacancy rate was 0.0%, and the rental vacancy rate was 3.1%.

0.0% of residents lived in urban areas, while 100.0% lived in rural areas.

Post Mountain CDP, California – Racial and ethnic composition Note: the US Census treats Hispanic/Latino as an ethnic category. This table excludes Latinos from the racial categories and assigns them to a separate category. Hispanics/Latinos may be of any race.
Race / Ethnicity (NH = Non-Hispanic)	Pop 2020	% 2020
White alone (NH)	1,197	39.48%
Black or African American alone (NH)	2	0.07%
Native American or Alaska Native alone (NH)	15	0.49%
Asian alone (NH)	1,674	55.21%
Pacific Islander alone (NH)	4	0.13%
Other race alone (NH)	9	0.30%
Mixed race or Multiracial (NH)	23	0.76%
Hispanic or Latino (any race)	108	3.56%
Total	3,032	100.00%
