= Lewiston Lake =

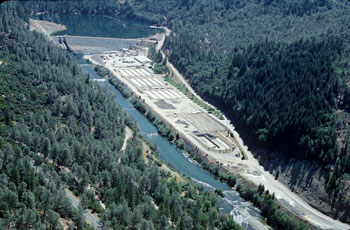
- Lewiston Dam on the Trinity River forming the lake behind

- Location within California Location within the United States
- Location: Trinity County, California
- Coordinates: 40.7316836°N 122.7984709°W
- Type: Reservoir
- Primary inflows: Trinity River
- Primary outflows: Trinity River
- Basin countries: United States
- Surface area: 750 acres (300 ha)
- Water volume: 14,660 acre⋅ft (18.08 GL)
- Surface elevation: 1,903 ft (580 m)
- Settlements: Weaverville, California

Lewiston Lake is a reservoir impounded by Lewiston Dam on the Trinity River, in Trinity County, California.

== Geography ==
Lewiston Lake is near the towns of Weaverville and Lewiston in Trinity County, California.

It is used for transbasin diversion to the Sacramento River and flood control, as well as for hydroelectric generation. It is in the canyon between the Trinity Mountains and Marble Mountains of the southern Klamath Mountains System.

== Recreation ==
Lewiston reservoir is within the Trinity Unit of the Whiskeytown-Shasta-Trinity National Recreation Area, in the Shasta-Trinity National Forest. It is a popular destination for fishing, kayaking, and camping.

The California Office of Environmental Health Hazard Assessment (OEHHA) has developed a safe eating advisory for Lewiston Lake based on levels of mercury or PCBs found in fish caught from this water body.

== See also ==
- List of dams and reservoirs in California
- Trinity Mountains topics
