= Trinity Center, California =

Trinity Center
- census-designated place
- Position in California
- Coordinates: 40°59′03″N 122°42′30″W
- Country: United States
- State: California
- County: Trinity

Area
  - Total: 5.231 sq mi (13.548 km^{2})
  - Land: 5.231 sq mi (13.548 km^{2})
  - Water: 0 sq mi (0 km^{2}) 0%
- Elevation: 2,510 ft (770 m)

Population (2020)
  - Total: 198
  - Density: 37.9/sq mi (14.6/km^{2})
- Time zone: UTC-8 (Pacific (PST))
  - Summer (DST): UTC-7 (PDT)
- ZIP Code: 96091
- Area code: 530
- GNIS feature ID: 2583167

Trinity Center is a census-designated place (CDP) in Trinity County, California, United States. Trinity Center is located 29 miles (47 km) north of Weaverville. It is home to Trinity Lake, a popular summer tourist destination. It is home to a store, Trinity Center Airport, a marina, a community church, several campgrounds, and several small resorts.

Coffee Creek is close by. The ZIP code is 96091. Trinity Center sits at an elevation of 2,390 feet (730 m). Its population is 198 as of the 2020 census, down from 267 from the 2010 census.

== History ==
The original town of Trinity Center was established in 1851 as a stage stop for travelers headed further north and now lies beneath the lake, which came into existence after the construction of the Trinity River Dam in 1961. A handful of buildings were moved to the town's present day location, including the I.O.O.F. building and several residences. Trinity Center was a gold mining town, as was shown by the mine tailings left at the north end of the lake.

== Geography ==
According to the United States Census Bureau, the CDP covers an area of 5.2 square miles (13.5 km^{2}), all land.

== Climate ==
According to the Köppen Climate Classification system, Trinity Center has a hot-summer mediterranean climate, abbreviated "Csa" on climate maps. The hottest temperature recorded in Trinity Center was 116 °F (46.7 °C) on July 29, 2022, while the coldest temperature recorded was 4 °F (−15.6 °C) on December 22, 1990.

Climate data for Trinity River Hatchery, California, 1991–2020 normals, extremes 1974–present
Month	Jan	Feb	Mar	Apr	May	Jun	Jul	Aug	Sep	Oct	Nov	Dec	Year
Record high °F (°C)	70 (21)	81 (27)	85 (29)	94 (34)	101 (38)	111 (44)	116 (47)	113 (45)	114 (46)	99 (37)	83 (28)	67 (19)	116 (47)
Mean maximum °F (°C)	58.4 (14.7)	67.6 (19.8)	75.3 (24.1)	83.6 (28.7)	91.5 (33.1)	100.0 (37.8)	105.0 (40.6)	103.5 (39.7)	99.4 (37.4)	89.4 (31.9)	71.9 (22.2)	56.8 (13.8)	106.6 (41.4)
Mean daily maximum °F (°C)	50.0 (10.0)	56.0 (13.3)	61.5 (16.4)	67.7 (19.8)	77.3 (25.2)	86.5 (30.3)	95.6 (35.3)	94.4 (34.7)	88.8 (31.6)	75.6 (24.2)	58.4 (14.7)	48.2 (9.0)	71.7 (22.0)
Daily mean °F (°C)	41.4 (5.2)	44.5 (6.9)	48.4 (9.1)	52.7 (11.5)	60.6 (15.9)	67.6 (19.8)	74.8 (23.8)	73.1 (22.8)	67.2 (19.6)	57.1 (13.9)	47.1 (8.4)	40.2 (4.6)	56.2 (13.5)
Mean daily minimum °F (°C)	32.7 (0.4)	32.9 (0.5)	35.4 (1.9)	37.7 (3.2)	44.0 (6.7)	48.6 (9.2)	54.0 (12.2)	51.9 (11.1)	45.6 (7.6)	38.6 (3.7)	35.6 (2.0)	32.3 (0.2)	40.8 (4.9)
Mean minimum °F (°C)	23.5 (−4.7)	23.7 (−4.6)	27.6 (−2.4)	29.2 (−1.6)	34.1 (1.2)	39.0 (3.9)	46.9 (8.3)	45.1 (7.3)	37.3 (2.9)	29.6 (−1.3)	25.0 (−3.9)	23.5 (−4.7)	19.1 (−7.2)
Record low °F (°C)	12 (−11)	10 (−12)	20 (−7)	23 (−5)	27 (−3)	33 (1)	37 (3)	38 (3)	32 (0)	20 (−7)	15 (−9)	4 (−16)	4 (−16)
Average precipitation inches (mm)	5.95 (151)	4.71 (120)	4.07 (103)	2.57 (65)	1.69 (43)	0.86 (22)	0.19 (4.8)	0.14 (3.6)	0.33 (8.4)	1.94 (49)	3.50 (89)	6.45 (164)	32.40 (823)
Average snowfall inches (cm)	1.2 (3.0)	1.6 (4.1)	0.3 (0.76)	0.0 (0.0)	0.0 (0.0)	0.0 (0.0)	0.0 (0.0)	0.0 (0.0)	0.0 (0.0)	0.0 (0.0)	0.6 (1.5)	2.7 (6.9)	6.4 (16.26)
Average precipitation days (≥ 0.01 in)	14.8	12.3	13.1	9.5	7.5	3.2	1.0	1.0	1.9	5.3	10.8	14.8	95.2
Average snowy days (≥ 0.1 in)	1.1	0.7	0.2	0.1	0.0	0.0	0.0	0.0	0.0	0.0	0.3	1.4	3.8
Source 1: NOAA
Source 2: National Weather Service

== Demographics ==
Historical population
Census	Pop.	Note	%±
1860	240		—
1870	160		−33.3%
2010	267		—
2020	198		−25.8%
U.S. Decennial Census; 1850–1870 1880-1890; 1900 1910 1920; 1930 1940 1950; 1960 1970 1980; 1990 2000 2010

The 2020 United States census reported that Trinity Center had a population of 198. The population density was 37.9 inhabitants per square mile (14.6/km^{2}). The racial makeup of Trinity Center was 179 (90.4%) White, 0 (0.0%) African American, 4 (2.0%) Native American, 0 (0.0%) Asian, 0 (0.0%) Pacific Islander, 1 (0.5%) from other races, and 14 (7.1%) from two or more races. Hispanic or Latino of any race were 5 persons (2.5%).

The whole population lived in households. There were 107 households, out of which 31 (29.0%) had children under the age of 18 living in them, 52 (48.6%) were married-couple households, 13 (12.1%) were cohabiting couple households, 25 (23.4%) had a female householder with no partner present, and 17 (15.9%) had a male householder with no partner present. 20 households (18.7%) were one person, and 10 (9.3%) were one person aged 65 or older. The average household size was 1.85. There were 76 families (71.0% of all households).

The age distribution was 23 people (11.6%) under the age of 18, 3 people (1.5%) aged 18 to 24, 25 people (12.6%) aged 25 to 44, 67 people (33.8%) aged 45 to 64, and 80 people (40.4%) who were 65 years of age or older. The median age was 59.4 years. There were 102 males and 96 females.

There were 316 housing units at an average density of 60.4 units per square mile (23.3 units/km^{2}), of which 107 (33.9%) were occupied. Of these, 64 (59.8%) were owner-occupied, and 43 (40.2%) were occupied by renters.

== Politics ==
In the state legislature, Trinity Center is in the 2nd senatorial district, represented by Democrat Mike McGuire, and the 2nd Assembly district, represented by Democrat Chris Rogers.

Federally, Trinity Center is in California's 2nd congressional district, represented by Democrat Jared Huffman.

== See also ==
- Trinity County, California
