= Coffee Creek, California =

Coffee Creek
- census-designated place
- Location of Coffee Creek in Trinity County, California.

- Location in California
- Coordinates: 41°5′1″N 122°42′48″W
- Country: United States
- State: California
- County: Trinity County

Area
  - Total: 11.54 sq mi (29.88 km^{2})
  - Land: 11.52 sq mi (29.83 km^{2})
  - Water: 0.019 sq mi (0.05 km^{2}) 0.16%
- Elevation: 3,068 ft (935 m)

Population (2020)
  - Total: 152
  - Density: 13.2/sq mi (5.09/km^{2})
- Time zone: UTC-8 (Pacific (PST))
  - Summer (DST): UTC-7 (PDT)
- ZIP Code: 96091
- Area code: 530
- FIPS code: 06-14406

Coffee Creek is a census-designated place located within Trinity County in the U.S. state of California. It is located just north of where Coffee Creek flows into the Trinity River along the Trinity Heritage Scenic Byway (California State Route 3) and is the most northern community in Trinity County. It contains Coffee Creek Elementary School. Coffee Creek Road originates at SR 3, offering access to the interior of the Trinity Alps; the dirt road is 20 miles long and only usable by high-clearance vehicles. Coffee Creek sits at an elevation of 2,495 feet (760 m). The community's population was 152 as of the 2020 census, down from 217 from the 2010 census.

== Geography ==
According to the United States Census Bureau, the CDP covers an area of 11.5 square miles (29.9 km^{2}), of which 99.84% is land and 0.16% water.

== Demographics ==
Historical population
Census	Pop.	Note	%±
2010	217		—
2020	152		−30.0%
U.S. Decennial Census; 1850–1870 1880-1890; 1900 1910 1920; 1930 1940 1950; 1960 1970 1980; 1990 2000 2010

=== 2020 census ===
As of the 2020 census, Coffee Creek had a population of 152. The population density was 13.2 inhabitants per square mile (5.1/km^{2}). All residents (100.0%) lived in rural areas, with no residents living in urban areas.

The median age was 58.3 years. The age distribution was 23 people (15.1%) under the age of 18, 8 people (5.3%) aged 18 to 24, 22 people (14.5%) aged 25 to 44, 51 people (33.6%) aged 45 to 64, and 48 people (31.6%) who were 65 years of age or older. There were 69 males and 83 females; for every 100 females there were 83.1 males, and for every 100 females age 18 and over there were 76.7 males age 18 and over.

Of the 152 residents, 151 people (99.3%) lived in households, 1 (0.7%) lived in non-institutionalized group quarters, and no one was institutionalized. There were 61 households, of which 18.0% had children under the age of 18 living in them. Of all households, 47.5% were married-couple households, 4.9% were cohabiting couple households, 29.5% had a male householder with no partner present, and 18.0% had a female householder with no partner present. About 27.9% of all households were made up of individuals, and 14.8% had someone living alone who was 65 years of age or older. The average household size was 2.48. There were 40 families (65.6% of all households).

There were 133 housing units at an average density of 11.5 units per square mile (4.4 units/km^{2}), of which 61 (45.9%) were occupied and 72 (54.1%) were vacant. The homeowner vacancy rate was 2.0% and the rental vacancy rate was 18.8%. Of occupied units, 49 (80.3%) were owner-occupied and 12 (19.7%) were occupied by renters.

Racial composition as of the 2020 census
Race	Number	Percent
White	130	85.5%
Black or African American	0	0.0%
American Indian and Alaska Native	2	1.3%
Asian	2	1.3%
Native Hawaiian and Other Pacific Islander	0	0.0%
Some other race	1	0.7%
Two or more races	17	11.2%
Hispanic or Latino (of any race)	12	7.9%

== Politics ==
In the state legislature, Coffee Creek is in the 2nd senatorial district, represented by Democrat Mike McGuire, and the 2nd Assembly district, represented by Democrat Chris Rogers.

Federally, Coffee Creek is in California's 2nd congressional district, represented by Democrat Jared Huffman.

== See also ==
- Trinity County, California
