= Junction City, California =

Junction City
- census-designated place
- Location of Junction City in Trinity County, California.

- Position in California.
- Coordinates: 40°44′37″N 123°03′31″W
- Country: United States
- State: California
- County: Trinity

Area
  - Total: 26.570 sq mi (68.816 km^{2})
  - Land: 26.536 sq mi (68.728 km^{2})
  - Water: 0.034 sq mi (0.088 km^{2}) 0.13%
- Elevation: 1,909 ft (582 m)

Population (2020)
  - Total: 658
  - Density: 24.8/sq mi (9.57/km^{2})
- Time zone: UTC-8 (Pacific (PST))
  - Summer (DST): UTC-7 (PDT)
- ZIP Code: 96048
- Area code: 530
- GNIS feature ID: 2583043

Junction City is a census-designated place (CDP) in Trinity County, California, United States. Junction City sits at an elevation of 1,909 feet (582 m). Its population is 658 as of the 2020 census, down from 680 from the 2010 census. Junction City is located 8 miles (13 km) west of Weaverville. The Trinity River runs through the town and heads northwest from there. The ZIP Code is 96048. The community is served by area code 530.

== History ==
Junction City was established when a few cabins were built in the 1850s at the mouth of Canyon Creek, it was originally called "Milltown" due to the number of mills, but in 1861 it was officially named Junction City since it served as a junction for several transportation routes at Canyon Creek and Trinity River.

Junction City had the largest and most famous diversion dam. The Arkansas Dam, was built in 1851, four miles upstream of Junction City. After the dam washed out in the winter of 1851 and again in 1852, it was rebuilt so substantially as to withstand not only the winter storms but also contain an upstream dam break flood that occurred when the 14-foot-high diversion dam at Union bar gave way.

The ensuing flood wiped out every water wheel, dam, and other structures along the river in the intervening 20 miles between the dams. In 1857, Arkansas dam was removed by the miners so they could reach the gold deposits beneath the dam.

In 1988, a Tibetan Buddhist temple, Rigdzin Ling, part of the Chagdud Gonpa Foundation founded by Chagdud Tulku Rinpoche.

In the May 8th, 2005 the hotel burned down under mysterious circumstances. It was one of the last remaining buildings in Junction City from the 1800s. In May 2006, the Junction Fire scorched 3,500 acres (14 km^{2}), then later combined with the Bar Fire, making that 100,000 acres (400 km^{2}). The Junction Fire threatened all of Junction City, and even some parts of the town of Weaverville.

On July 20, 2008, fire threatened communities near Junction City; some areas were under mandatory evacuation. Many huge forest fires broke out because of a lightning storm which occurred on June 20, 2008, in Northern California.

== Education ==
Public schools are run or overseen by the Junction City Elementary School District, which consists of one elementary school and they follow by a single track schedule, with school starting in late August or early September and concludes in June. The only school is a K-8 school listed below.

- Junction City Elementary School

== Geography ==
According to the United States Census Bureau, the CDP covers an area of 26.6 square miles (68.8 km^{2}) of which 99.87% is land and 0.13% is water.

== Transportation ==
=== Major highways ===
- State Route 299. State route 299 runs through the middle of Junction City. This is part of SR 299 that is between Arcata and Redding is the Trinity Scenic Byway, a National Forest Scenic Byway.

== Parks and Trails ==
- Junction City Park

== Demographics ==
=== Population ===
Historical population
Census	Pop.	Note	%±
1870	440		—
2000	620		—
2010	680		9.7%
2020	658		−3.2%
U.S. Decennial Census; 1850–1870 1880-1890; 1900 1910 1920; 1930 1940 1950; 1960 1970 1980; 1990 2000 2010

=== 2020 census ===
The 2020 United States census reported that Junction City had a population of 658. The population density was 24.8 inhabitants per square mile (9.6/km^{2}). The racial makeup of Junction City was 545 (82.8%) White, 3 (0.5%) African American, 9 (1.4%) Native American, 15 (2.3%) Asian, 1 (0.2%) Pacific Islander, 9 (1.4%) from other races, and 76 (11.6%) from two or more races. Hispanic or Latino of any race were 46 persons (7.0%).

The census reported that 97.3% of the population lived in households, 18 people (2.7%) lived in non-institutionalized group quarters, and no one was institutionalized.

There were 272 households, out of which 67 (24.6%) had children under the age of 18 living in them, 136 (50.0%) were married-couple households, 19 (7.0%) were cohabiting couple households, 51 (18.8%) had a female householder with no partner present, and 66 (24.3%) had a male householder with no partner present. 79 households (29.0%) were one person, and 43 (15.8%) were one person aged 65 or older. The average household size was 2.35. There were 168 families (61.8% of all households).

The age distribution was 79 people (12.0%) under the age of 18, 27 people (4.1%) aged 18 to 24, 178 people (27.1%) aged 25 to 44, 168 people (25.5%) aged 45 to 64, and 206 people (31.3%) who were 65 years of age or older. The median age was 52.0 years. For every 100 females, there were 118.6 males.

There were 322 housing units at an average density of 12.1 units per square mile (4.7 units/km^{2}), of which 272 (84.5%) were occupied. Of these, 226 (83.1%) were owner-occupied, and 46 (16.9%) were occupied by renters.

== Politics ==
In the state legislature, Junction City is in the 2nd senatorial district, represented by Democrat Mike McGuire, and the 2nd Assembly district, represented by Democrat Chris Rogers.

Federally, Junction City is in California's 2nd congressional district, represented by Democrat Jared Huffman.

== Historical Markers ==
There is one historical marker in Junction City to commemorate its centennial. It is located next to the Junction City store.

== See also ==
- Trinity County, California
