= Decametre =

Unit of length

decametre
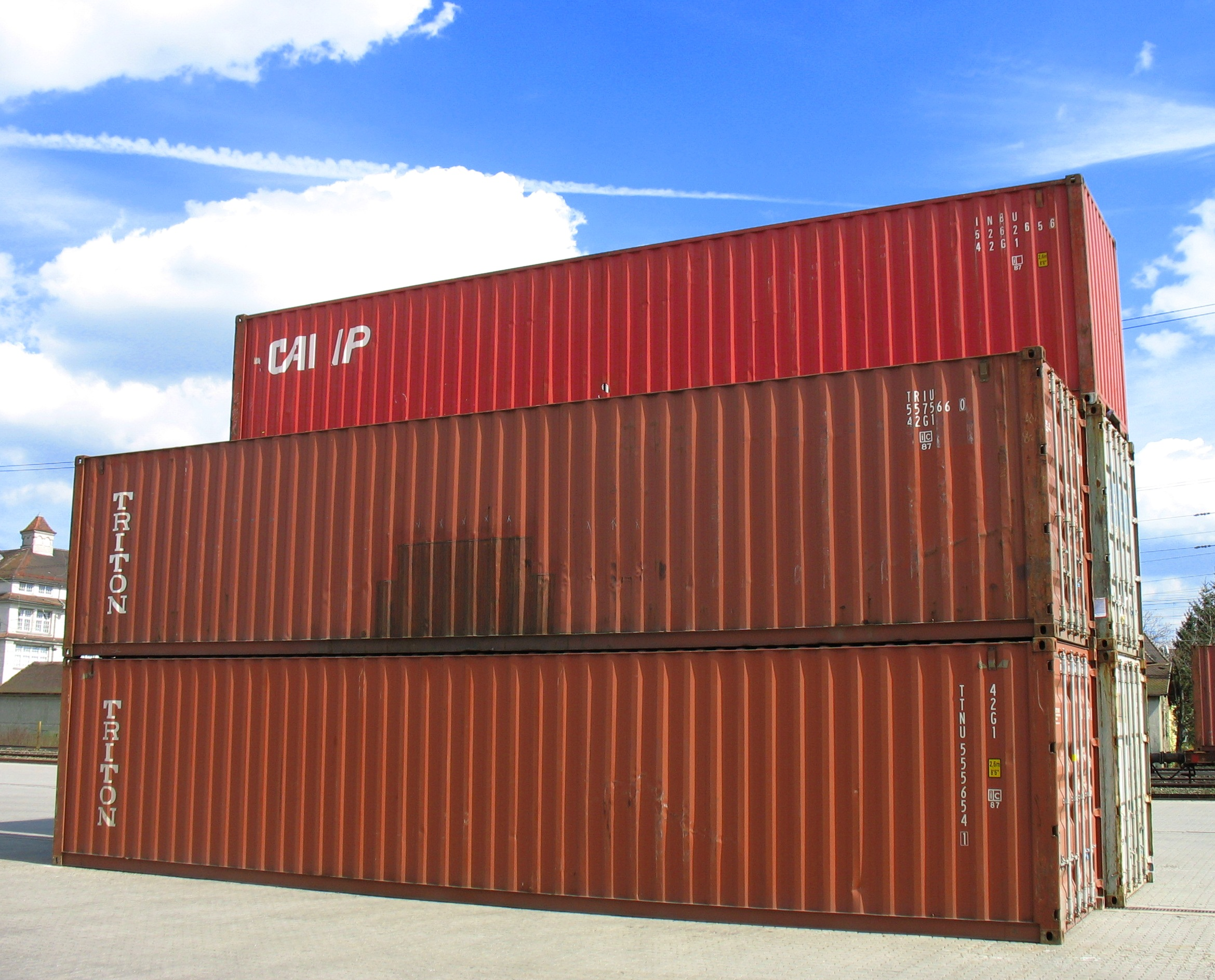
- A stack of 12.2-metre-long (1.22-decametre) intermodal containers

General information
- Unit system: SI
- Unit of: length
- Symbol: dam

Conversions
1 dam in ...	... is equal to ...
- SI base units: 10 m
- imperial/US units: 10.936 yd 393.70 in 393700 thou

A decametre (International spelling as used by the International Bureau of Weights and Measures and by most English speaking countries, United States spelling dekameter), symbol dam ("da" for the SI prefix deca-, "m" for the SI unit metre), is a unit of length in the International System of Units (SI) equal to ten metres.

While any combination of SI prefix and unit can be used, many are rarely used in practice; the decametre is used less frequently than other units of length. One practical use is for altitude of geopotential heights in meteorology. The volumetric form cubic decametre is convenient for describing large volumes of water such as in rivers and lakes; a volume of one cubic decametre (dam^{3}) is equivalent to a capacity of 1,000 cubic metres or one megalitre (ML).

One technical atmosphere is the pressure of one decametre of water. Also, the are (a), a non-SI metric unit for land area, is equal to one square decametre (dam^{2}).

== See also ==
- Orders of magnitude (length)
- Conversion of units, for comparison with other units
- Megalitre (cubic decametre)
