= Trinity County, California =

County in California, United States

Coordinates: 40.66°N 123.12°W

Trinity County
- County
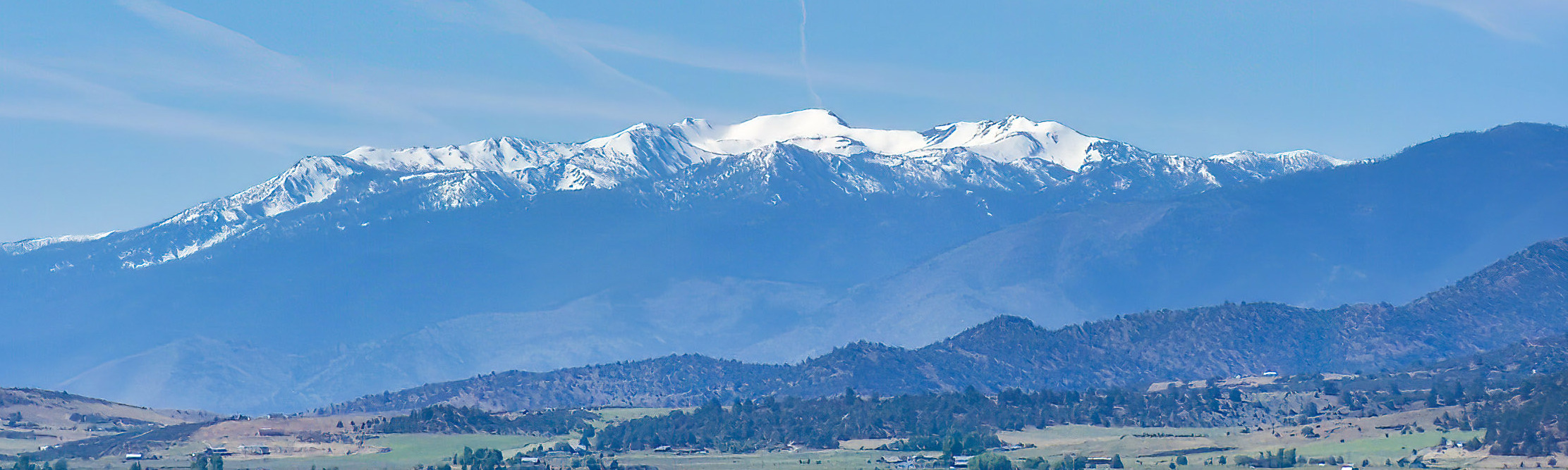
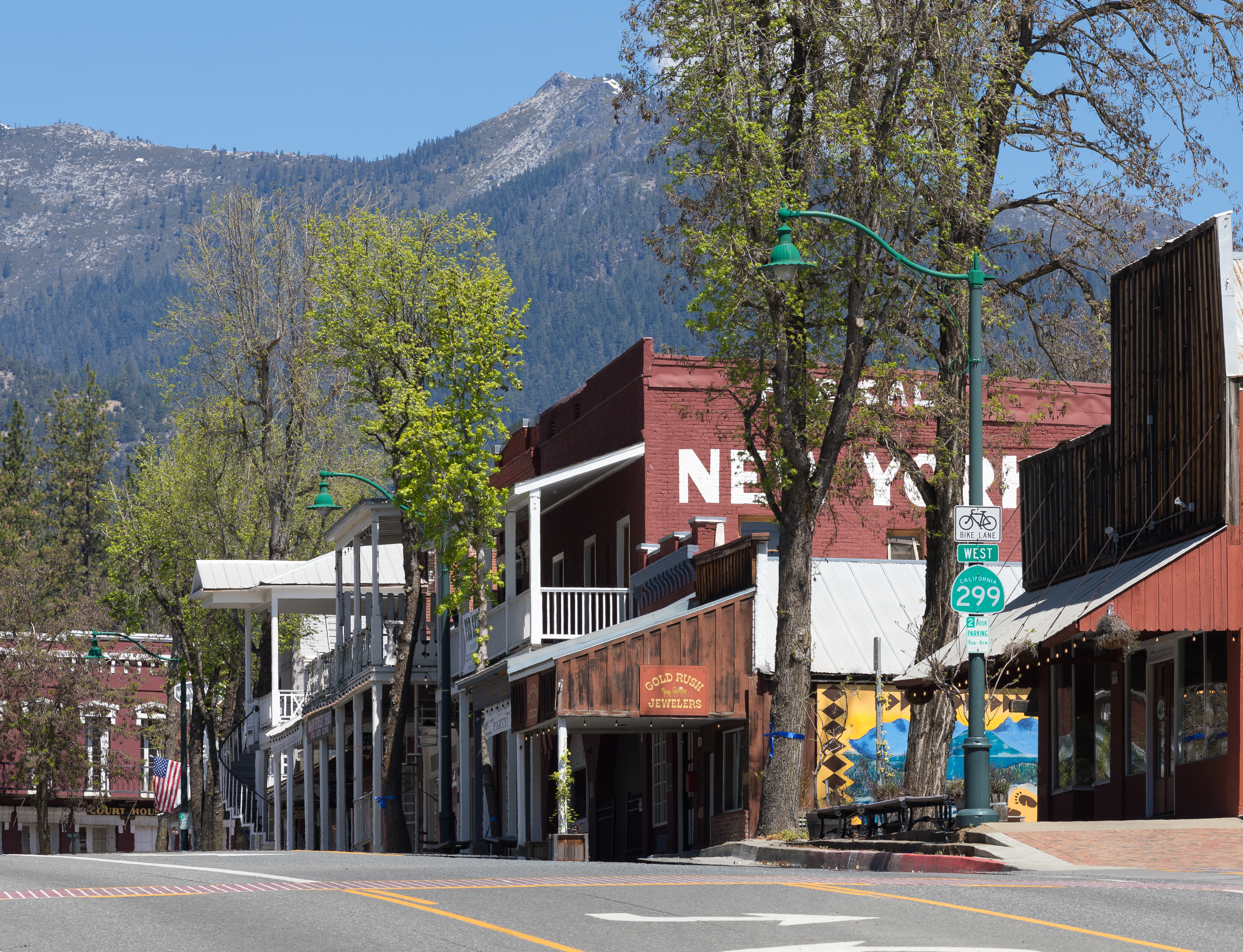
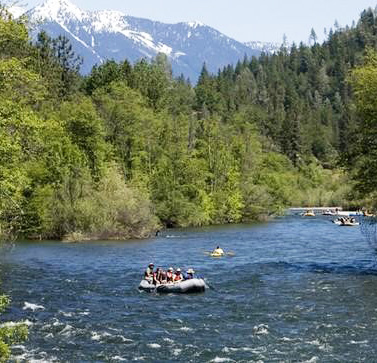
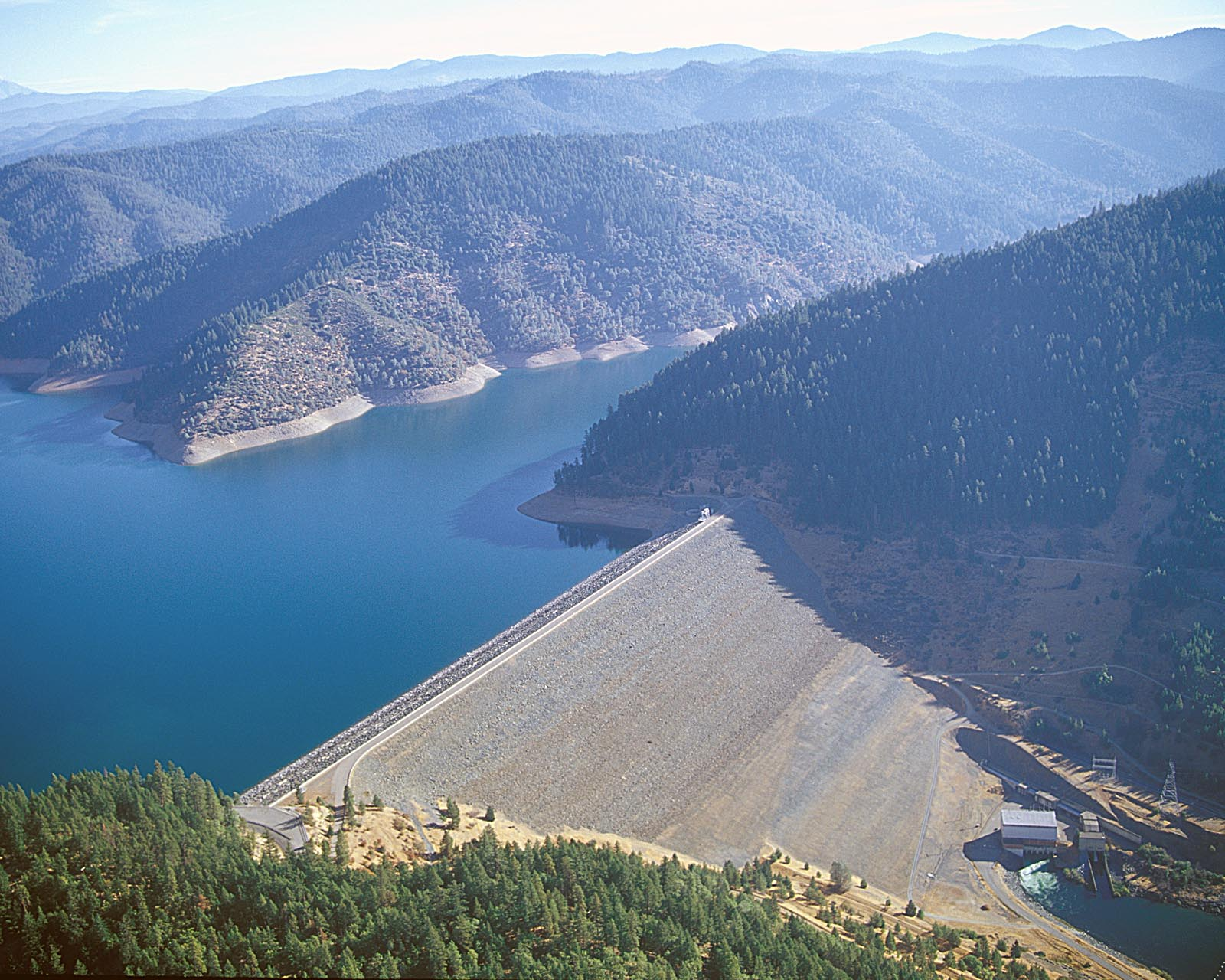
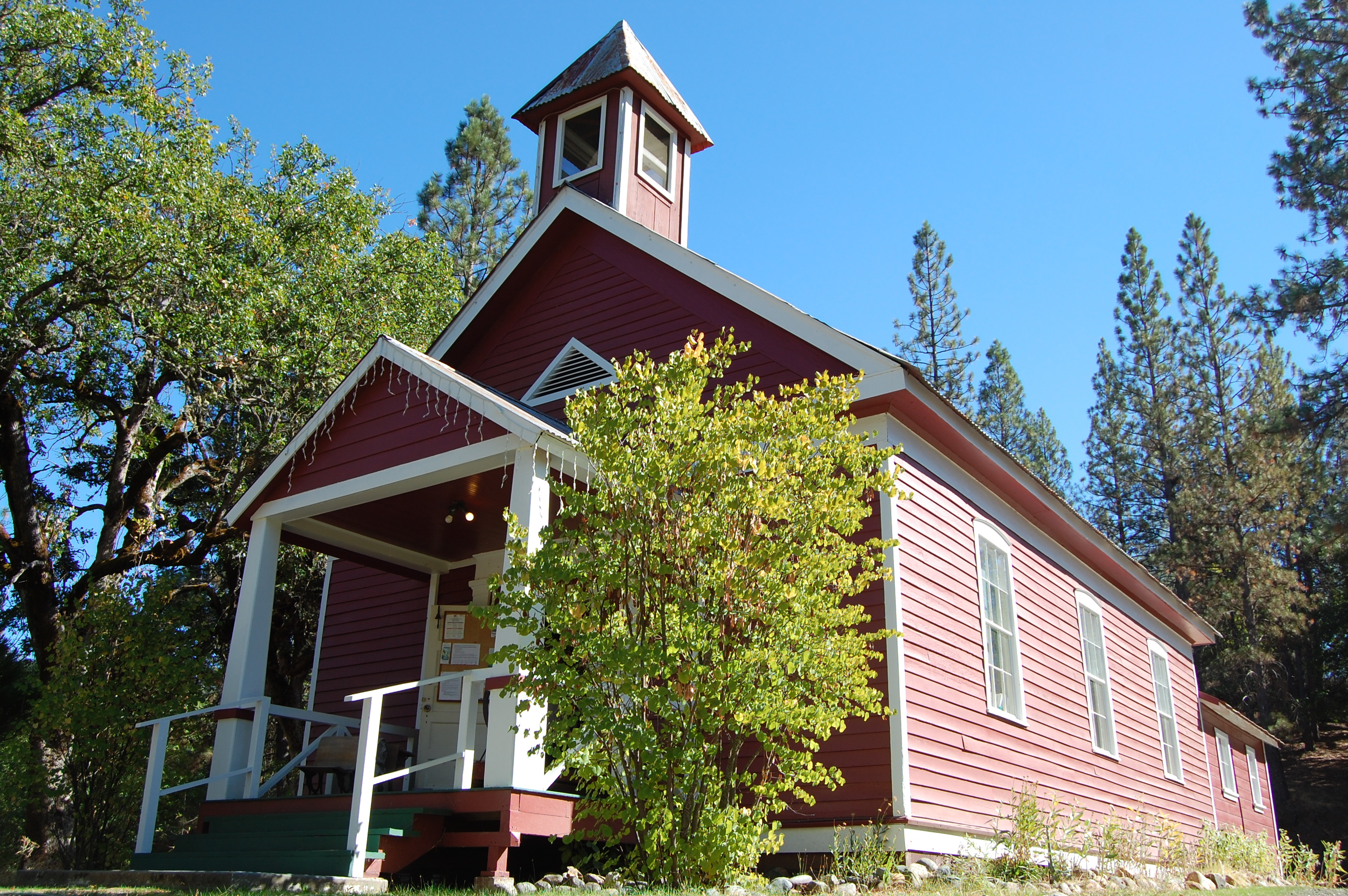
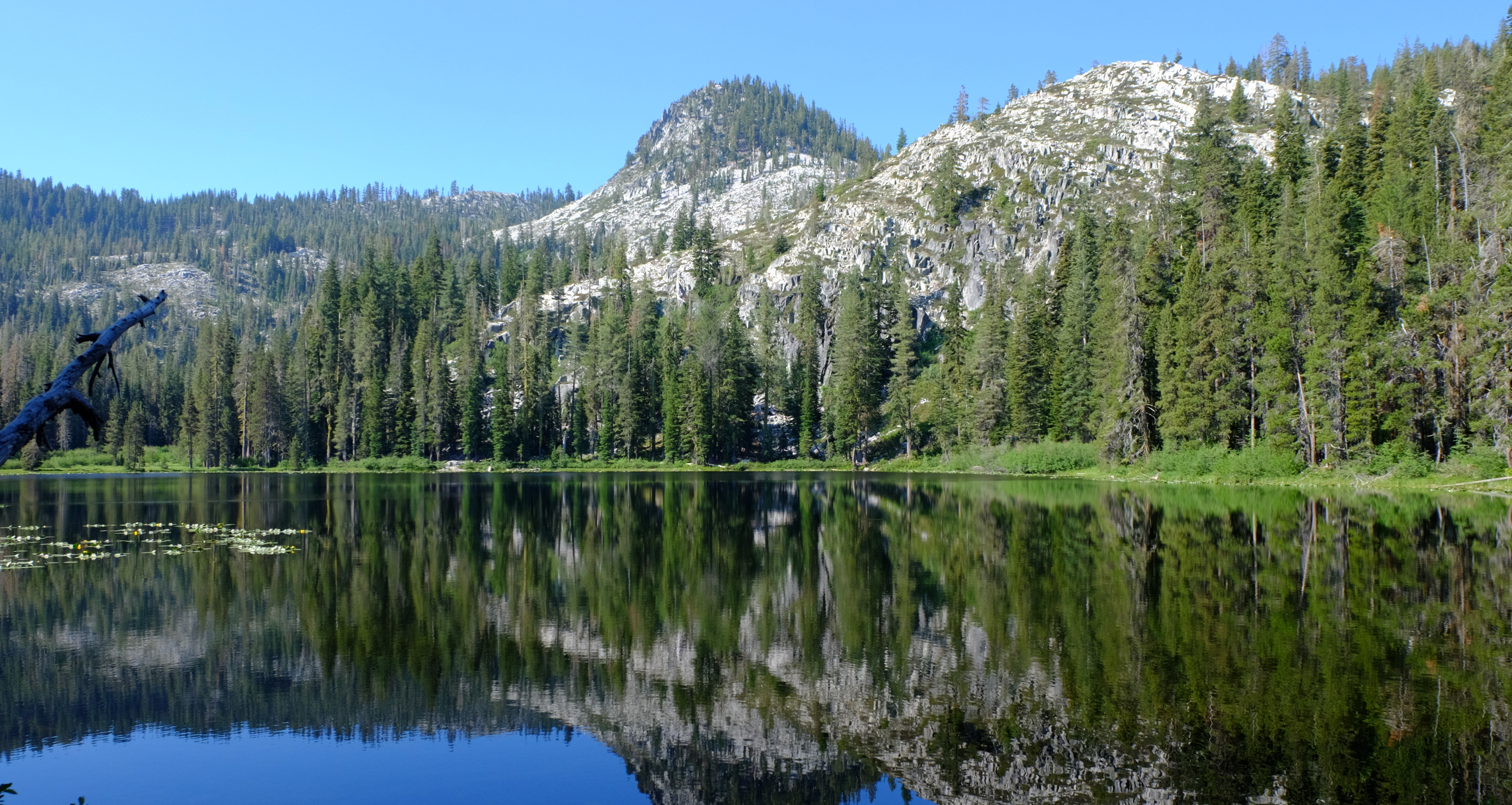
- Mt. Eddy in Shasta–Trinity National Forest Weaverville Trinity River Trinity Lake Lewiston Trinity Alps Wilderness in the Klamath Mountains

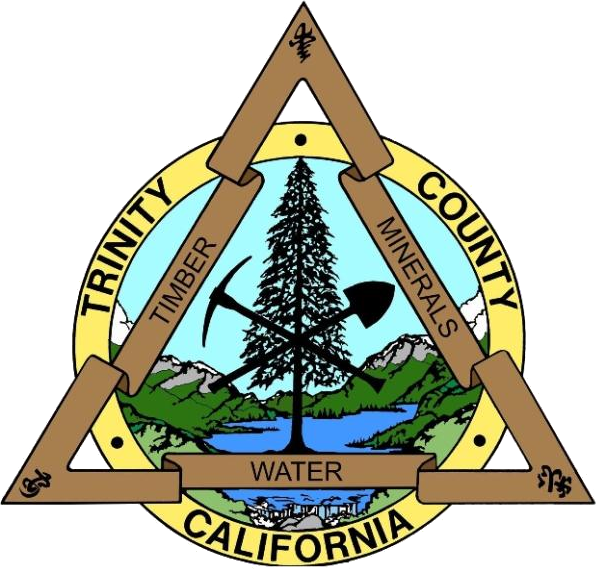
- Flag Seal
- Interactive map of Trinity County
- Location in California
- Country: United States
- State: California
- Region: North Coast
- Incorporated: February 18, 1850
- Named for: Trinity River
- County seat: Weaverville
- Largest community: Weaverville

Government
  - Type: Council–CAO
  - Chair: Heidi Carpenter-Harris
  - Vice Chair: Julia Brownfield
  - Board of Supervisors: Supervisors: Ric Leutwyler; Jill Cox; Liam Gogan; Heidi Carpenter-Harris; Julia Brownfield
  - County administrative officer: Trent Tuthill

Area
  - Total: 3,208 sq mi (8,310 km^{2})
  - Land: 3,179 sq mi (8,230 km^{2})
  - Water: 28 sq mi (73 km^{2})
- Highest elevation: 9,037 ft (2,754 m)

Population (April 1, 2020)
  - Total: 16,112
  - Estimate (2025): 15,720 ▼
  - Density: 5.068/sq mi (1.957/km^{2})

GDP
  - Total: $0.466 billion (2022)
- Time zone: UTC−8 (Pacific Time Zone)
  - Summer (DST): UTC−7 (Pacific Daylight Time)
- Area code: 530
- FIPS code: 06-105
- GNIS feature ID: 277317
- Congressional district: 2nd
- Website: www.trinitycounty.org

Trinity County is a county located in the northwestern portion of the U.S. state of California. Trinity County is rugged, mountainous, heavily forested, and lies along the Trinity River (for which it is named) within the Salmon, Klamath Mountains, as well as a portion of the Scott, Trinity, and North Yolla Bolly Mountains. It is also one of three counties in California with no incorporated cities (the other two counties in California with that distinction are Alpine and Mariposa counties).

As of the 2020 census, the population was 16,112, making it the fifth least-populous county in California, and the least-populous of California's 27 original counties. The county seat and largest community is Weaverville.

== History ==
Trinity County has a rich history of Native Americans: Tsnungwe including the South Fork Hupa and tł'oh-mitah-xwe, Chimariko, and Wintu.

The county takes its name from the Trinity River, which was in turn named in 1845 by Major Pierson B. Reading, who was under the mistaken impression that the river emptied into Trinidad Bay. Trinity is the English translation of Trinidad.

Trinity County was one of the original counties of California, created in 1850 at the time of statehood. Parts of the county were ceded to Klamath County in 1852 and to Humboldt County in 1853.

=== Boundary dispute with Mendocino County ===
In the first half of the 1850s the California State Legislature established that the boundaries of Mendocino and Trinity Counties was the 40th parallel north. Both county board of supervisor's hired the surveyor W.H. Fauntleroy to survey the parallel, which he completed on October 30, 1872. The accuracy of the boundary was doubtful, and by 1891 the Mendocino County Board of Supervisors requested the California surveyor-general to survey the line and establish the boundaries between the two counties. The new line, as surveyed by Sam H. Rice and approved by the California Attorney General on December 18, 1891, was found to be two miles north of the common boundary surveyed by W.H. Fauntleroy, thereby resulting in Trinity County exercising jurisdiction two miles south of the 40th parallel north. Between 1891 and 1907, both counties claimed that the two mile wide strip of land belonged to themselves and not the other, with both counties attempting to levy and collect property tax land in said strip. In 1907, Trinity County sued Mendocino County in a Tehama County court to settle the dispute. The trial court in Tehama County ruled in favor of Trinity County, even though the land was situated south of the 40th parallel and state law stated that lands south of that parallel belonged to Mendocino County. The appellate court upheld the ruling of the trial court since Section 10 of the special act of March 30, 1872 (Stats. 1871-2, p. 766), which concerned this boundary and was the act under which Fauntleroy acted under, authorized the survey of the theretofore unknown location of the 40th parallel north, stated that "the lines run out, marked and defined as required by this act are hereby declared to be the true boundary lines of the counties named herein", thereby making the law in the political code which defined the boundary as the 40th parallel north only a suggestion and not a fact. The legislature subsequently affirmed this decision, with the modern statute defining the borders of the two counties referencing the survey of Fauntleroy as being the boundary between the two counties instead of the 40th parallel north.

== Geography ==
According to the U.S. Census Bureau, the county has a total area of 3,208 square miles (8,310 km^{2}), of which 3,179 square miles (8,230 km^{2}) is land and 28 square miles (73 km^{2}) (0.9%) is water. The county contains a significant portion of Shasta-Trinity National Forest and the Trinity Alps Wilderness—the second largest wilderness in California.

Trinity County is made up of five census tracts. Census Tract 1.01 includes the communities of Douglas City, Lewiston, Trinity Center, and part of Coffee Creek and Weaverville. Notable features are Trinity Dam and Lake, Lewiston Dam and Lake, the Trinity River, and the Lewiston Valley. It has a population of 2585 people in 550 square miles, leading to a population density of 4.7 people per square mile. Census Tract 1.02 includes most of Weaverville and Coffee Creek. It is the most populous census tract in the county, with 4558 people. It has 449 square miles, leading to a population density of 10.2 people per square mile. Notable features are the Weaver Basin, the Trinity Alps, Scott Mountains, and the upper Trinity River. Census Tract 2 includes the Downriver area of Trinity County. This means the communities of Junction City, Big Flat, Big Bar, Burnt Ranch, Hawkins Bar, and Salyer. It includes 2024 people, and notable features are the Trinity River, the Trinity Alps, and the New River. Census Tract 3 includes the communities of Hayfork, Hyampom, and Wildwood. It has 3105 people in 600 square miles, leading to a population density of 5.2 people per square mile. Notable features are the South Fork of the Trinity River, South Fork Mountain, Hayfork Valley and Hayfork Creek, Hyampom Valley, Chanchellula Peak and Wilderness area, and Hayfork Bally. Census Tract 4 is the largest by area but the least populous census tract in the county with 975 people. It contains 833 square miles, leading to a population density of 1.2 people per square mile. The largest community by far is Mad River, with other smaller ones being Ruth, Kettenpom, and Zenia. Notable features include South Fork Mountain, the Mad River, the Van Duzen River, Ruth Lake, Ruth Valley, Kettenpom Valley, Hoaglin Valley, and Hettenshaw Valley.

The county hosts many visitors, especially during summer months, for camping, backpacking, boating on the lakes, rafting/kayaking on the rivers, hunting, and fishing. The summers tend to be clear, sunny, warm, and very dry, with little rain from June to September except for some mountain thunderstorms in the highest elevations. Summer days in the populated areas of the county range from 85 to 100 degrees, and summer nights range from 45 to 62 Winter days range from 35 to 50, and nights range from 18 to 35. The winters tend to have copious precipitation, increasing with elevation and falling mostly as rain under 1,000 m (3,300 ft) in the valley bottoms, and mostly as snow over 1,000 m (3,300 ft) on the mountainsides. December, January, and February are the wettest. The precipitation ranges from 30 to 35 inches at low elevations isolated from coastal influence, such as Big Bar, Hayfork, and Weaverville, up to 55 or 60 inches at high elevations, on the coastal side of South Fork Mountain, or where gaps in the mountain allow for precipitation to get through. Examples of this last phenomenon include Salyer and Forest Glen. Kalmia Lake, at nearly 7500 feet in the Canyon Creek area of the Trinity Alps, is reputed to be the snowiest place in California, outpacing Lake Helen in Mount Lassen National Park, which receives 600-700 inches of snow each winter. Average snowfall in the populated parts of the county ranges from 0-5 inches in the lower Trinity Valley to at least 100 inches in places above 4000 feet, such as Indian Valley west of Hayfork.

There is an extensive wild river and stream system, and the terrain is quite rugged and forested, with the highest point at Mount Eddy, over 9,000 ft (2,700 m). The Klamath Mountains occupy the vast portion of the county.

=== Adjacent counties ===
- Siskiyou County - north
- Shasta County - east
- Tehama County - southeast
- Mendocino County - south
- Humboldt County - west

=== National protected areas ===
- Shasta-Trinity National Forest (part)
- Six Rivers National Forest (part)
- Mendocino National Forest (part)
- Shasta-Trinity National Recreation Area (part)
- Trinity Alps Wilderness (part)
- Yolla Bolly-Middle Eel Wilderness (part)

== Climate ==
Trinity County has a mediterranean climate with very warm, dry and sunny summer days and high diurnal temperature variation due to the cool nights. The hot afternoons form a stark contrast to the mild coastal climates of Humboldt County relatively nearby. Winters are chilly and wet. Below is climate normals from county seat Weaverville. There are different microclimates in the county as elevations vary.

Climate data for Weaverville, California (1991–2020 normals, 1894–2020 extremes)
Month	Jan	Feb	Mar	Apr	May	Jun	Jul	Aug	Sep	Oct	Nov	Dec	Year
Record high °F (°C)	75 (24)	82 (28)	90 (32)	94 (34)	106 (41)	113 (45)	113 (45)	116 (47)	111 (44)	104 (40)	89 (32)	85 (29)	116 (47)
Mean maximum °F (°C)	61.0 (16.1)	69.2 (20.7)	77.4 (25.2)	84.8 (29.3)	93.5 (34.2)	101.0 (38.3)	105.3 (40.7)	104.4 (40.2)	100.6 (38.1)	91.0 (32.8)	72.4 (22.4)	59.1 (15.1)	106.8 (41.6)
Mean daily maximum °F (°C)	49.5 (9.7)	55.3 (12.9)	61.1 (16.2)	67.6 (19.8)	77.1 (25.1)	86.1 (30.1)	95.1 (35.1)	94.5 (34.7)	88.5 (31.4)	75.2 (24.0)	57.3 (14.1)	46.7 (8.2)	71.2 (21.8)
Daily mean °F (°C)	40.3 (4.6)	43.3 (6.3)	47.2 (8.4)	51.8 (11.0)	59.4 (15.2)	66.3 (19.1)	73.7 (23.2)	72.3 (22.4)	66.2 (19.0)	55.8 (13.2)	45.4 (7.4)	38.6 (3.7)	55.0 (12.8)
Mean daily minimum °F (°C)	31.2 (−0.4)	31.2 (−0.4)	33.3 (0.7)	36.1 (2.3)	41.8 (5.4)	46.4 (8.0)	52.2 (11.2)	50.0 (10.0)	43.9 (6.6)	36.4 (2.4)	33.4 (0.8)	30.5 (−0.8)	38.9 (3.8)
Mean minimum °F (°C)	20.3 (−6.5)	20.7 (−6.3)	23.1 (−4.9)	25.7 (−3.5)	31.3 (−0.4)	35.9 (2.2)	43.8 (6.6)	42.6 (5.9)	34.8 (1.6)	27.1 (−2.7)	21.3 (−5.9)	19.0 (−7.2)	14.9 (−9.5)
Record low °F (°C)	−7 (−22)	0 (−18)	12 (−11)	16 (−9)	22 (−6)	28 (−2)	32 (0)	29 (−2)	23 (−5)	14 (−10)	4 (−16)	−10 (−23)	−10 (−23)
Average precipitation inches (mm)	6.68 (170)	5.69 (145)	5.01 (127)	2.62 (67)	1.86 (47)	0.93 (24)	0.27 (6.9)	0.17 (4.3)	0.31 (7.9)	2.00 (51)	4.33 (110)	7.67 (195)	37.54 (954)
Average snowfall inches (cm)	2.2 (5.6)	1.3 (3.3)	0.2 (0.51)	0.2 (0.51)	0.0 (0.0)	0.0 (0.0)	0.0 (0.0)	0.0 (0.0)	0.0 (0.0)	0.0 (0.0)	0.8 (2.0)	4.0 (10)	8.7 (22)
Average precipitation days (≥ 0.01 in)	17.1	14.8	13.8	10.3	5.7	3.6	1.3	1.2	2.1	6.0	14.5	18.1	108.5
Average snowy days (≥ 0.1 in)	1.5	0.8	0.4	0.3	0.0	0.0	0.0	0.0	0.0	0.0	0.5	1.4	4.9
Source: NOAA

== Politics ==
Trinity was a Republican-leaning county in Presidential and congressional elections until recently; now it is a tossup. No Democrat had won the county since Jimmy Carter in 1976 until Barack Obama defeated John McCain by a 4% margin (50% to 46%) in 2008. In 2012, the county again voted Republican, but narrowly. Voter registration reflects this trend, with Democratic and Republican registration in a near dead heat (D: 2,710, R: 2,716). Third-party candidates tend to do rather well in Trinity County: George Wallace got over 13% of the county's vote in 1968, and it was the only California county carried by Ross Perot in 1992. It was also Perot's best performance in the state in 1996, although he didn't carry it again. John Anderson also did very well in 1980, as did third-party candidates in 2016.

Trinity County was the only California county where Obama won in 2008 and Joe Biden lost in 2020.

United States presidential election results for Trinity County, California (Note: This total comprised 343 votes for Progressive Theodore Roosevelt (who was official Republican nominee in California), 182 votes for Socialist Eugene V. Debs and 9 votes for Prohibition Party nominee Eugene W. Chafin.)
Year	Republican		Democratic		Third party(ies)	
Year	No.	%	No.	%	No.	%
1892	495	50.82%	457	46.92%	22	2.26%
1896	502	46.44%	545	50.42%	34	3.15%
1900	544	52.36%	485	46.68%	10	0.96%
1904	467	54.11%	308	35.69%	88	10.20%
1908	393	44.41%	331	37.40%	161	18.19%
1912	1	0.10%	461	46.29%	534	53.61%
1916	424	35.16%	661	54.81%	121	10.03%
1920	622	62.89%	285	28.82%	82	8.29%
1924	336	36.48%	154	16.72%	431	46.80%
1928	447	48.85%	433	47.32%	35	3.83%
1932	318	21.09%	1,101	73.01%	89	5.90%
1936	655	30.87%	1,424	67.11%	43	2.03%
1940	780	34.79%	1,431	63.83%	31	1.38%
1944	567	42.22%	770	57.33%	6	0.45%
1948	975	45.08%	1,053	48.68%	135	6.24%
1952	1,697	57.14%	1,242	41.82%	31	1.04%
1956	1,447	50.42%	1,406	48.99%	17	0.59%
1960	1,418	38.35%	2,262	61.17%	18	0.49%
1964	1,252	36.41%	2,175	63.25%	12	0.35%
1968	1,426	43.12%	1,433	43.33%	448	13.55%
1972	1,868	50.75%	1,621	44.04%	192	5.22%
1976	1,989	45.66%	2,172	49.86%	195	4.48%
1980	3,048	54.96%	1,734	31.27%	764	13.78%
1984	3,544	59.71%	2,218	37.37%	173	2.91%
1988	3,267	54.63%	2,518	42.11%	195	3.26%
1992	1,886	31.28%	1,967	32.63%	2,176	36.09%
1996	2,530	42.93%	2,203	37.38%	1,160	19.68%
2000	3,340	57.62%	1,932	33.33%	525	9.06%
2004	3,560	54.66%	2,782	42.71%	171	2.63%
2008	2,940	46.12%	3,233	50.72%	201	3.15%
2012	2,716	47.87%	2,674	47.13%	284	5.01%
2016	2,812	49.45%	2,214	38.94%	660	11.61%
2020	3,188	50.93%	2,851	45.55%	220	3.51%
2024	2,979	52.76%	2,449	43.38%	218	3.86%

Trinity County is in California's 2nd congressional district, represented by Democrat Jared Huffman.

In the state legislature Trinity is in the 2nd senatorial district, represented by Democrat Mike McGuire, and the 2nd Assembly district, represented by Democrat Chris Rogers.

In 2010, Trinity County voted against Proposition 19, which would have taxed and regulated marijuana.

In 2016 Trinity County residents were asked again to vote on legalization of state-level recreational marijuana, facilitated by the Adult Use of Marijuana Act (AUMA), also known as California Proposition 64. The measure passed with 50.1% in favor of legalization. Statewide, the measure passed with 57.1% of the vote.

In 2008, Trinity County voted in favor of Proposition 8, which banned same-sex marriage, but then voted in 2024 in favor of Proposition 3, which repealed the amendment.

=== Voter registration statistics ===
Population and registered voters
Total population	13,711	
Registered voters (Note: Percentage of registered voters with respect to total population. Percentages of party members with respect to registered voters follow.)	7,846	57.2%
Democratic	2,630	33.5%
Republican	2,695	34.3%
Democratic–Republican spread	-65	-0.8%
Independent	376	4.8%
Green	126	1.6%
Libertarian	93	1.2%
Peace and Freedom	33	0.4%
Americans Elect	0	0.0%
Other	100	1.3%
No party preference	1,793	22.9%

== Transportation ==
=== Major highways ===
- State Route 299
- State Route 3
- State Route 36

=== Public transportation ===
Timelapse of section of Trinity County, California, looking at evidence of clear-cut logging over the years 1972–1994. Data from Landsat satellites.

Trinity Transit provides weekday intercity bus service on State Routes 3 and 299, with connecting service in Willow Creek and the Redding Amtrak station. Service is also provided from Weaverville to Lewiston (MWF) and Hayfork (daily).

=== Airports ===
The county owns five general aviation airports: Trinity Center Airport, Weaverville Airport, Hayfork Airport, Hyampom Airport and Ruth Airport. The closest major airport is in Sacramento.

== Crime ==
The following table includes the number of incidents reported and the rate per 1,000 persons for each type of offense.

Population and crime rates
Population	13,711	
Violent crime	22	1.60
Homicide	0	0.00
Forcible rape	0	0.00
Robbery	3	0.22
Aggravated assault	19	1.39
Property crime	123	8.97
Burglary	60	4.38
Larceny-theft (Note: Only larceny-theft cases involving property over $400 in value are reported as property crimes.)	66	4.81
Motor vehicle theft	26	1.90
Arson	0	0.00

== Demographics ==
=== 2020 census ===
As of the 2020 census, the county had a population of 16,112. The median age was 47.6 years. 16.7% of residents were under the age of 18 and 24.9% of residents were 65 years of age or older. For every 100 females there were 128.7 males, and for every 100 females age 18 and over there were 131.6 males age 18 and over.

The racial makeup of the county was 72.2% White, 0.4% Black or African American, 2.7% American Indian and Alaska Native, 13.8% Asian, 0.2% Native Hawaiian and Pacific Islander, 2.3% from some other race, and 8.4% from two or more races. Hispanic or Latino residents of any race comprised 5.8% of the population.

0.0% of residents lived in urban areas, while 100.0% lived in rural areas.

There were 6,290 households in the county, of which 24.8% had children under the age of 18 living with them and 21.9% had a female householder with no spouse or partner present. About 29.7% of all households were made up of individuals and 14.2% had someone living alone who was 65 years of age or older.

There were 8,183 housing units, of which 23.1% were vacant. Among occupied housing units, 71.3% were owner-occupied and 28.7% were renter-occupied. The homeowner vacancy rate was 1.9% and the rental vacancy rate was 4.8%.

The most reported ancestries in the county were English (14.3%), German (12.8%), Hmong (12.7%), Irish (12.2%), Italian (3.9%), and Scottish (3.7%).

=== Racial and ethnic composition ===
Trinity County, California – Racial and ethnic composition Note: the US Census treats Hispanic/Latino as an ethnic category. This table excludes Latinos from the racial categories and assigns them to a separate category. Hispanics/Latinos may be of any race.
Race / Ethnicity (NH = Non-Hispanic)	Pop 1980	Pop 1990	Pop 2000	Pop 2010	Pop 2020	% 1980	% 1990	% 2000	% 2010	% 2020
White alone (NH)	11,002	11,881	11,271	11,518	11,374	92.78%	90.95%	86.55%	83.55%	70.59%
Black or African American alone (NH)	13	53	54	45	66	0.11%	0.41%	0.41%	0.33%	0.41%
Native American or Alaska Native alone (NH)	453	594	583	558	416	3.82%	4.55%	4.48%	4.05%	2.58%
Asian alone (NH)	50	99	58	93	2,212	0.42%	0.76%	0.45%	0.67%	13.73%
Native Hawaiian or Pacific Islander alone (NH)	x	x	15	16	24	x	x	0.12%	0.12%	0.15%
Other race alone (NH)	21	5	13	20	106	0.18%	0.04%	0.10%	0.15%	0.66%
Mixed race or Multiracial (NH)	x	x	511	577	977	x	x	3.92%	4.19%	6.06%
Hispanic or Latino (any race)	319	431	517	959	937	2.69%	3.30%	3.97%	6.96%	5.82%
Total	11,858	13,063	13,022	13,786	16,112	100.00%	100.00%	100.00%	100.00%	100.00%

=== American Community Survey 2025 data ===
The United States Census Bureau estimated that in 2025, Trinity County's population was 15,720. It was also estimated that the county's population was 71.54% Non-Hispanic White, 7.32% Hispanic or Latino, 0.69% Non-Hispanic Black, 11.98% Asian, 2.75% Native American, 0.17% Pacific Islander, and 5.55% Multiracial.

Total	Population	Percentage
Non-Hispanic White	11.246	71,54%
Hispanic or Latino	1.151	7,32%
Non-Hispanic Black	108	0,69%
Asian	1.883	11,98%
Native American	433	2,75%
Pacific Islander	26	0,17%
Non-Hispanic Multiracial	873	5,55%

=== 2010 census ===
The 2010 United States census reported that Trinity County had a population of 13,786. The racial makeup of Trinity County was 12,033 (87.3%) White, 59 (0.4%) African American, 655 (4.8%) Native American, 94 (0.7%) Asian, 16 (0.1%) Pacific Islander, 217 (1.6%) from other races, and 712 (5.2%) from two or more races. Hispanic or Latino of any race were 959 persons (7.0%).

Population reported at 2010 United States census
The County	Total; Population	White	African; American	Native; American	Asian	Pacific; Islander	other races	two or more races	Hispanic or Latino (of any race)
Trinity County	13,786	12,033	59	655	94	16	217	712	959
Census-designated places	Total; Population	White	African; American	Native; American	Asian	Pacific; Islander	other races	two or more races	Hispanic or Latino (of any race)
Burnt Ranch	281	241	0	15	4	0	1	20	19
Coffee Creek	217	198	0	5	5	0	3	6	16
Douglas City	713	639	0	22	8	2	13	29	47
Hayfork	2,368	1,999	4	162	8	2	38	155	189
Hyampom	241	199	0	20	0	0	7	15	19
Junction City	680	597	1	29	2	0	20	31	49
Lewiston	1,193	1,074	8	37	6	5	21	42	78
Mad River	420	383	1	11	1	0	7	17	21
Ruth	195	170	0	9	1	0	1	14	2
Trinity Center	267	249	0	7	1	3	2	5	11
Trinity Village	297	269	1	18	0	0	0	9	4
Weaverville	3,600	3,162	11	152	41	1	38	195	255
Other unincorporated areas	Total; Population	White	African; American	Native; American	Asian	Pacific; Islander	other races	two or more races	Hispanic or Latino (of any race)
All others not CDPs (combined)	3,314	2,853	33	168	17	3	66	174	249

=== 2000 census ===
Historical population
Census	Pop.	Note	%±
1850	1,635		—
1860	5,125		213.5%
1870	3,213		−37.3%
1880	4,999		55.6%
1890	3,719		−25.6%
1900	4,383		17.9%
1910	3,301		−24.7%
1920	2,551		−22.7%
1930	2,809		10.1%
1940	3,970		41.3%
1950	5,087		28.1%
1960	9,706		90.8%
1970	7,615		−21.5%
1980	11,858		55.7%
1990	13,063		10.2%
2000	13,022		−0.3%
2010	13,786		5.9%
2020	16,112		16.9%
2025 (est.)	15,720	▼	−2.4%
U.S. Decennial Census; 1790-1960 1900-1990; 1990-2000 2010-2020

As of the 2000 census, there were 13,022 people, 5,587 households, and 3,625 families residing in the county. The population density was 4 people per square mile (1.5 people/km^{2}). There were 7,980 housing units at an average density of 2 units per square mile (0.77 units/km^{2}). The racial makeup of the county was 88.9% White, 0.5% Black or African American, 4.9% Native American, 0.5% Asian, 0.1% Pacific Islander, 0.9% from other races, and 4.4% from two or more races. 4.0% of the population were Hispanic or Latino of any race. 16.1% were of German, 13.4% English, 12.1% Irish and 9.5% American ancestry according to Census 2000. 97.3% spoke English and 1.8% Spanish as their first language.

There were 5,587 households, out of which 25.4% had children under the age of 18 living with them, 50.5% were married couples living together, 10.1% had a female householder with no husband present, and 35.1% were non-families. 29.5% of all households were made up of individuals, and 11.1% had someone living alone who was 65 years of age or older. The average household size was 2.29 and the average family size was 2.80.

In the county, the population was spread out, with 22.8% under the age of 18, 5.1% from 18 to 24, 22.7% from 25 to 44, 32.1% from 45 to 64, and 17.2% who were 65 years of age or older. The median age was 45 years. For every 100 females there were 104.2 males. For every 100 females age 18 and over, there were 102.6 males.

The median income for a household in the county was $27,711, and the median income for a family was $34,343. Males had a median income of $31,131 versus $24,271 for females. The per capita income for the county was $16,868. About 14.1% of families and 18.7% of the population were below the poverty line, including 26.2% of those under age 18 and 7.2% of those age 65 or over.

According to the U.S. Census Bureau’s 2019-2023 American Community Survey (ACS) 5-year estimates, Trinity County has a population of roughly 15,700 residents, with a median household income of $53,498 and per capita income of about $31,301. Approximately 23% of residents live below the poverty line, reflecting persistent economic challenges in the county. The population is notably older than state averages, with a median age of about 55 years, and the county remains extremely rural with only a few residents per square mile.

== Communities ==
=== Census-designated places ===
- Burnt Ranch is a small, rural community on Highway 299 in the Downriver area of the county. It lies above Burnt Ranch Gorge, a famed whitewater stretch of the Trinity River. The area around it is steep and forested, but there are many agricultural flats in the community proper. There is a volunteer fire department and an elementary school. The name comes from a settler's ranch that was burned by Native Americans.
- Coffee Creek is a small resort community on Highway 3 north of Trinity Lake. It sits where Coffee Creek meets the Trinity River. The community takes most of its economy from tourism, since it serves as the base camp for a popular trailhead into the Trinity Alps Wilderness. There are several guest ranches and resorts surrounding the community as well. It is home to a store, a pizza place, a campground and RV park, a church, and a fire department, as well as many guest accommodations in the surrounding area.
- Douglas City is a medium-sized community centered on Highway 299 and the Trinity River south of Weaverville. The homes are clustered around the river, although there are many elsewhere. The businesses in the town include a store, a fire department, and an elementary school. There are resorts and guest accommodations scattered along the river throughout the area.
- Hayfork is the second largest community in the county. It lies in the Hayfork Valley, the largest agricultural region in the county, and derives a significant part of the economy from ranching. It used to be a mill town as well and a gold rush town until the closing of the Sierra Pacific mill and a slow decline in mining in the 1990s due to reduced timber stocks, consolidation, and environmental regulations. Businesses include an elementary and high school, fire department, multiple grocery stores and bars, as well as a gas station and tire shop.
- Hyampom is the only CDP along the South Fork Trinity River. It lies in the Hyampom Valley, one of the largest agricultural areas in the county, and one of the main economic drivers is vineyards. It sits at the foot of South Fork Mountain at the confluence of Hayfork Creek and the South Fork. The South Fork is one of the largest undammed watersheds in California, and provides critical habitat for salmon and steelhead, although the populations have suffered in recent years due to environmental issues.
- Junction City is the most populous and uppermost community in the Downriver area. It is marked by a large flat along the Trinity River covered in gravel from gold mining in the 19th century. It is located where Canyon Creek meets the river, and 15 miles up the creek lies the Canyon Creek Trailhead, the most popular trailhead into the Trinity Alps. The community's institutions consist of an elementary school, a store, a cafe, and a fire department.
- Kettenpom California is a fairly large community located 10 miles southwest of Ruth. It is densely forested with some open terrain.
- Lewiston is the third-largest community in the county. Prior to the Trinity River Project that built Trinity and Lewiston Dams, Lewiston was a small country crossroads, but during construction, a large community was built to house the workers and it stands to this day as the center of Trinity River recreation, including fly fishing, swimming, boating, and rafting.
- Mad River is one of two larger communities in the county not in the Trinity River watershed, the other being Ruth. It lies along the Mad River where Highway 36 crosses it. Unlike the north part of the county, Mad River is surrounded by rolling hills and mixed oak woodlands and Douglas fir forests. The businesses in the community include a church, a fire department, an elementary school, and a high school, one of three in the county.
- Post Mountain is on the north side of Highway 36, mainly in the valley of Post Creek. It was defined as a CDP for the 2020 census. It is also known as Trinity Pines.
- Ruth is the second community outside of the Trinity River basin, and one of the smallest in the county. It lies in the Ruth Valley south of Ruth Lake. The economy centers on Ruth Lake and the tourism attracted by it. Businesses include a church, a cafe, and many resorts and campgrounds.
- Salyer is on the western edge of Trinity County, along the Trinity River where it is joined by the South Fork. It was defined as a CDP for the 2020 census.
- Trinity Center is the largest community on Trinity Lake, which brings in tourism and sustains the economy of the town. It used to lie at the bottom of a valley that was flooded by Trinity Lake in the 1950s, when it was moved to its current location along with several historic buildings. It is home to the busiest airport in the county.
- Trinity Village locally known as Hawkins Bar, is a community in the Downriver area. The only non-accommodation business is a bar and grill. Its economy is based on recreation on the Trinity River.
- Weaverville is the county seat and by far the largest community in the county. It is nestled along Weaver Creek in the Weaver Basin along Highway 299. It got its beginnings as a Gold Rush town, and there are still many historic buildings, including several of the oldest brick buildings in the state and the oldest county courthouse. There was a thriving Chinese community at the height of the Gold Rush, and a state park today houses the oldest Taoist temple in the state, the Joss House.

=== Unincorporated communities ===
- Big Bar
- Del Loma
- Denny
- Forest Glen
- Hawkins Bar
- Peanut
- Zenia

=== Former cities/towns/communities ===
City	Year incorporated	Year dissolved	Fate
Helena, California	1851	1950s	Became private property
Canon City, California	1851	1891	Nothing remains of the former town but a historical marker.
Dedrick, California	1890	1941	Nothing remains of the former town but a historical marker.
Deadwood, Trinity County, California	1881	1915	Nothing remains of the former town.

== Education ==
K-12 school districts include:

Unified:

- Klamath-Trinity Joint Unified School District
- Mountain Valley Unified School District
- Southern Trinity Joint Unified School District
- Trinity Alps Unified School District - Serves some areas for PK-12 and others only for grades 9-12

Elementary:

- Burnt Ranch Elementary School District
- Coffee Creek Elementary School District
- Douglas City Elementary School District
- Junction City Elementary School District
- Lewiston Elementary School District
- Trinity Center Elementary School District

== Population ranking ==
The population ranking of the following table is based on the 2020 census of Trinity County.

† county seat

Rank	City/Town/etc.	Municipal type	Population (2020 Census)
1	† Weaverville	CDP	3,667
2	Post Mountain	CDP	3,032
3	Hayfork	CDP	2,324
4	Lewiston	CDP	1,222
5	Douglas City	CDP	868
6	Junction City	CDP	658
7	Round Valley Reservation (partially in Mendocino County)	AIAN	454
8	Salyer	CDP	389
9	Mad River	CDP	361
10	Trinity Village	CDP	278
11	Ruth	CDP	254
12	Burnt Ranch	CDP	250
13	Hyampom	CDP	241
14	Trinity Center	CDP	198
15	Coffee Creek	CDP	152

== See also ==
- Hiking trails in Trinity County
- National Register of Historic Places listings in Trinity County, California
- Trinity Lakes American Viticultural Area
- Willow Creek American Viticultural Area
