= California high school basketball championship =

Below is a list of state and regional California high school basketball champions sanctioned by the California Interscholastic Federation.

== State champions ==
=== Boys ===
Year	Open Division	Division I	Division II	Division III	Division IV	Division V
1981	Not awarded	Bishop O'Dowd (Oakland) def. Castlemont (Oakland) 70–69	Not awarded	Not awarded		
1982	Not awarded	Carson (Los Angeles) def. Washington (San Francisco) 54–53	Drake (San Anselmo) def. Banning 87–85	Not awarded		
1983	Not awarded	Crenshaw (Los Angeles) def. Bishop O'Dowd (Oakland) 62–55 OT	Menlo School def. Santa Clara (Oxnard) 53–51	Cloverdale def. Crossroads 71–64	Not awarded	
1984	Not awarded	Long Beach Poly def. St. Ignatius (San Francisco) 65–45	Modesto def. Oceanside 50–47	Cloverdale def. Pasadena Poly 53–52	Not awarded	
1985	Not awarded	Crenshaw (Los Angeles) def. James Logan 72–62 OT	Washington Union (Fresno) def. Rio Americano (Sacramento) 69–56	Folsom def. Avenal 68–57	Not awarded	
1986	Not awarded	Crenshaw (Los Angeles) def. Bishop O'Dowd (Oakland) 70–69	Wilson (Hacienda Heights) def. Aptos 72–46	Vanden def. Crossroads 68–63	Not awarded	
1987	Not awarded	Mater Dei (Santa Ana) def. Ygnacio Valley 69–51	Woodbridge (Irvine) def. De Anza (Richmond) 89–63	Crossroads def. Colusa 83–65	Not awarded	
1988	Not awarded	Manual Arts (Los Angeles) def. Bishop O'Dowd (Oakland) 54–53	Foothill (Bakersfield) def. Menlo-Atherton 66–61	Jefferson (Daly City) def. Lincoln (San Diego) 77–71	Washington Union (Fresno) def. Terra Linda (San Rafael) 76–55	Ripon Christian def. Calipatria 67–63
1989	Not awarded	Crenshaw (Los Angeles) def. Skyline (Oakland) 70–63	Menlo-Atherton def. Glendora 89–83	Central Valley (Shasta Lake) def. Trabuco Hills 62–61	Santa Clara (Oxnard) def. Cardinal Newman (Santa Rosa) 62–49	Menlo School def. Bel-Air Prep 64–59
1990	Not awarded	Mater Dei (Santa Ana) def. Archbishop Riordan (San Francisco) 62–60	Artesia def. Fremont (Sunnyvale) 57–50	Servite (Anaheim) def. Mt. Eden (Hayward) 67–51	Santa Clara (Oxnard) def. Vanden (Fairfield) 56–38	Colusa def. Christian (El Cajon) 62–48
1991	Not awarded	St. Joseph Notre Dame def. Fremont (Los Angeles) 67–61	Tustin def. San Ramon Valley 66–54	Estancia (Costa Mesa) def. Washington (Fremont) 82–72	Hayward def. Santa Clara (Oxnard) 62–45	Ribet Academy def. University (San Francisco) 70–65
1992	Not awarded	St. Joseph Notre Dame def. Mater Dei (Santa Ana) 59–37	Artesia def. San Ramon Valley 57–50	Morningside (Inglewood) def. Seaside 79–72	Palma (Salinas) def. Lincoln (San Diego) 55–54	Ripon Christian def. Faith Baptist (Canoga Park) 80–70
1993	Not awarded	Crenshaw (Los Angeles) def. Jesuit (Carmichael) 73–66	Artesia def. Valley (Pleasanton) 68–66 OT	Palo Alto def. Morningside (Inglewood) 79–59	Serra (Gardena) def. Palma (Salinas) 67–44	Emery (Emeryville) def. Brethren Christian (Cypress) 74–47
1994	Not awarded	Crenshaw (Los Angeles) def. Jesuit (Carmichael) 89–79	East Bakersfield def. Oakmont (Roseville) 68–59	Foothill (Sacramento) def. Pacifica (Garden Grove) 81–61	Lincoln (San Diego) def. Drake (San Anselmo) 63–50	Ripon Christian def. Pacific Hills 60–46
1995	Not awarded	Mater Dei (Santa Ana) def. Fremont (Oakland) 71–67 OT	St. Francis (Mountain View) def. Dominguez (Compton) 73–65	Northgate (Walnut Creek) def. Artesia 47–41	Verbum Dei (Los Angeles) def. Capuchino (San Bruno) 60–59	Montclair Prep (Van Nuys) def. University (San Francisco) 83–67
1996	Not awarded	Crenshaw (Los Angeles) def. De La Salle (Concord) 91–81	Dominguez (Compton) def. Northgate (Walnut Creek) 65–49	Harvard-Westlake def. Grant (Sacramento) 62–49	Washington Union (Fresno) def. Cardinal Newman (Santa Rosa) 56–42	St. Elizabeth (Oakland) def. Montclair Prep (Van Nuys) 72–67
1997	Not awarded	Crenshaw (Los Angeles) def. St. Joseph Notre Dame 88–82	Dominguez (Compton) def. Shasta (Redding) 85–52	Harvard-Westlake def. Hillsdale (San Mateo) 80–50	Crossroads def. Encina (Sacramento) 93–57	Modesto Christian def. Horizon (San Diego) 56–47
1998	Not awarded	Westchester def. St. Joseph Notre Dame 52–40	Santa Margarita Catholic def. Montgomery (Santa Rosa) 61–52	University (San Diego) def. Enterprise (Redding) 51–48	Verbum Dei (Los Angeles) def. Pacific Grove 59–50	Pacific Hills def. Brookside Christian (Stockton) 69–52
1999	Not awarded	Fremont (Oakland) def. Mater Dei (Santa Ana) 50–45	Dominguez (Compton) def. Grant (Sacramento) 72–59	Washington Union (Fresno) def. El Cerrito 77–71	Verbum Dei (Los Angeles) def. Christian Brothers (Sacramento) 74–63	Santa Clara (Oxnard) def. Calvary Temple Christian (Modesto) 75–68
2000	Not awarded	De La Salle (Concord) def. Clovis West 47–46 (Runner-Up vacated)	Dominguez (Compton) def. Newark Memorial 53–41	Bishop Montgomery (Torrance) def. Foothill (Pleasanton) 73–56	Tamalpais (Mill Valley) def. St. Bernard 61–60	Price (Los Angeles) def. Hoopa Valley 71–66
2001	Not awarded	Mater Dei (Santa Ana) def. Modesto Christian 57–54	Dominguez (Compton) def. St. Francis (Mountain View) 71–53	Bishop Montgomery (Torrance) def. Archbishop Riordan (San Francisco) 55–43	St. Mary's (Berkeley) def. Crossroads 76–62	Price (Los Angeles) def. St. Elizabeth (Oakland) 68–53
2002	Not awarded	Westchester def. Oakland Tech 80–75	Martin Luther King (Riverside) def. St. Francis (Mountain View) 53–52	Archbishop Riordan (San Francisco) def. Centennial (Compton) 47–43	Horizon (San Diego) def. Valley Christian (San Jose) 78–45	Price (Los Angeles) def. University (San Francisco) 72–65
2003	Not awarded	Westchester def. Oakland Tech 73–63	Mater Dei (Santa Ana) def. Woodcreek 70–49	Foothill (Sacramento) def. Harvard-Westlake 66–62	Horizon (San Diego) def. Hercules 77–62	Price (Los Angeles) def. Modesto Christian 80–72
2004	Not awarded	Fairfax (Los Angeles) def. De La Salle (Concord) 51–35	Dominguez (Compton) def. Hayward 67–46	Centennial (Compton) def. Bishop O'Dowd (Oakland) 60–36	St. Joseph Notre Dame def. Verbum Dei (Los Angeles) 49–47	Modesto Christian def. Price (Los Angeles) 71–53
2005	Not awarded	Westchester def. Serra (San Mateo) 66–45	Oak Ridge (El Dorado Hills) def. Mater Dei (Santa Ana) 60–44	Santa Cruz def. St. Augustine (San Diego) 67–56	Campbell Hall def. St. Mary's (Berkeley) 74–53	Price (Los Angeles) def. Branson (Ross) 52–46
2006	Not awarded	De La Salle (Concord) def. Clovis West 43–40	Palo Alto def. Mater Dei (Santa Ana) 51–47	Artesia def. St. Mary's (Stockton) 60–41	Horizon (San Diego) def. Sacred Heart Cathedral 60–52	Branson (Ross) def. Santa Fe Christian (Solana Beach) 37–29
2007	Not awarded	Fairfax (Los Angeles) def. McClymonds 54–29	Mater Dei (Santa Ana) def. Archbishop Mitty 69–64 (OT)	Artesia def. Bishop O'Dowd (Oakland) 91–64	Campbell Hall def. Cardinal Newman (Santa Rosa) 70–34	Branson (Ross) def. View Park Prep (Los Angeles) 57–48 OT
2008	Not awarded	McClymonds def. Dominguez (Compton) 73–54	Mater Dei (Santa Ana) def. Archbishop Mitty 65–53	Santa Margarita Catholic def. Sacramento 72–55	Campbell Hall def. St. Mary's (Berkeley) 83–61	Branson (Ross) def. Renaissance Academy (La Cañada) 40–33
2009	Not awarded	Westchester def. McClymonds 49–31	Eisenhower (Rialto) def. Rocklin 73–61	Sacred Heart Cathedral def. Ocean View 62–55	Salesian (Richmond) def. Bishop Montgomery (Torrance) 65–64	Windward def. St. Joseph Notre Dame 69–53
2010	Not awarded	Westchester def. Memorial 63–56	Lincoln (San Diego) def. St. Francis (Mountain View) 74–59	Serra (Gardena) def. Bishop O'Dowd (Oakland) 63–59 OT	Price (Los Angeles) def. St. Mary's (Berkeley) 69–51	Lutheran (La Verne) def. Branson (Ross) 35–32
2011	Not awarded	Mater Dei (Santa Ana) def. De La Salle (Concord) 43–36	Archbishop Mitty def. Summit (Fontana) 53–50	Lutheran (La Verne) def. Bishop O'Dowd (Oakland) 64–59	Windward def. Salesian (Richmond) 63–57	St. Joseph Notre Dame def. St. Bernard 47–44
2012	Not awarded	Mater Dei (Santa Ana) def. Sheldon (Sacramento) 66–48	Archbishop Mitty def. La Costa Canyon 78–57	Bishop Alemany (Mission Hills) def. Sacred Heart Cathedral 71–67	Salesian (Richmond) def. Price (Los Angeles) 70–56	Village Christian def. St. Joseph Notre Dame 62–51
2013	Mater Dei (Santa Ana) def. Archbishop Mitty 50–45	Pleasant Grove def. Santa Monica 73–57	Redondo Union def. College Park (Pleasant Hill) 54–47	St. Augustine (San Diego) def. Sacred Heart Cathedral 59–52 OT	Pacific Hills def. Cardinal Newman (Santa Rosa) 58–52	Horizon Christian def. St. Joseph Notre Dame 47–46
2014	Mater Dei (Santa Ana) def. Bishop O'Dowd (Oakland) 71–61	Monte Vista def. Centennial (Corona) 66–55	St. John Bosco def. Folsom 63–54	Chaminade def. Drake (San Anselmo) 71–51	Bishop Montgomery def. Moreau Catholic (Hayward) 85–44	St. Joseph Notre Dame def. Renaissance Academy (La Cañada) 57–32
2015	Bishop O'Dowd (Oakland) def. Mater Dei (Santa Ana) 65–64 OT	San Ramon Valley def. Chino Hills 79–71 2OT	La Mirada def. Archbishop Mitty 71–70 2OT	Damien def. Campolindo 70–57	Crespi def. Capital Christian 47–44	Sierra Canyon def. University (San Francisco) 80–55
2016	Chino Hills def. De La Salle (Concord) 70–50	Crespi def. Berkeley 68–53	Serra (San Mateo) def. Long Beach Poly 48–43	Manteca def. Ayala (Chino Hills) 60–51	Harvard-Westlake def. Palma 66–49	St. Joseph Notre Dame def. St. Bernard 55–50
2017	Bishop Montgomery (Torrance) def. Woodcreek 74–67	Roosevelt (Eastvale) def. James Logan 54–45	Esperanza def. Moreau Catholic (Hayward) 72–65	Mission (San Francisco) def. Villa Park 82–75 OT	St. Patrick-St. Vincent def. Helix 59–46	Rolling Hills Prep def. St. Francis 47–46
2018	Sierra Canyon def. Sheldon 75–62	Chino Hills def. Las Lomas (Walnut Creek) 73–68	Crossroads def. Alameda 59–53	Pleasant Valley (Chico) def. Notre Dame (Riverside) 70–65	View Park def. Stuart Hall 74–62	Santa Clarita Christian def. Argonaut 78–66
2019	Sierra Canyon def. Sheldon 76–52	Chino Hills def. James Logan 69–63	Campolindo (Moraga) def. Colony (Ontario) 55–40	La Jolla Country Day def. University (San Francisco) 67–43	Ribet Academy def. Immanuel (Reedley) 60–49	Foothill (Bakersfield) def. Mt. Shasta 78–66
2020 (Note: The 2020 CIF State Championships, including the NorCal Boys Open Division and NorCal Girls Division VI Championships were canceled due to the COVID-19 pandemic)	Sierra Canyon vs. Sheldon/Bishop O'Dowd (Oakland)	Ribet Academy vs. Campolindo (Moraga)	St. Francis (La Canada) vs. Weston Ranch	Arroyo Grande vs. St. Mary's (Berkeley)	Bakersfield Christian vs. Brookside Christian (Stockton)	Eastside vs. San Domenico
2021 (Note: No State or NorCal championship was conducted in 2021 due to the COVID-19 pandemic)	Not awarded					
2022	Centennial (Corona) def. Modesto Christian 59–50	Damien def. Clovis North 65–57	Elk Grove def. Foothill (Santa Ana) 62–56	Pleasant Valley (Chico) def. Venice (Los Angeles) 57–53	Scripps Ranch def. Justin-Siena (Napa) 46–37	Stuart Hall def. Chaffey (Ontario) 56–45
2023	Harvard-Westlake def. St. Joseph (Santa Maria) 76–65	Notre Dame (Sherman Oaks) def. Granada (Livermore) 67–58	San Joaquin Memorial (Fresno) def. Pacifica Christian (Newport Beach) 58–47	Oakland def. Buena (Ventura) 59–43	Valencia def. Half Moon Bay 87–59	Lynwood def. Sierra (Tollhouse) 89–58
2024	Harvard-Westlake def. Salesian (Richmond) 50–45	St. John Bosco def. San Ramon Valley 78–62	Oakland Tech def. Centennial (Bakersfield) 79–55	Alemany (Mission Hills) def. Santa Cruz 63–53	Monterey def. Chatsworth 74–66	Athenian (Danville) def. Verdugo Hills 67–49
2025	Roosevelt (Eastvale) def. Archbishop Riordan 80–60	Sierra Canyon def. Lincoln (Stockton) 58–53	Jesuit (Carmichael) def. Chatsworth 66–53	San Gabriel Academy def. The King's Academy (Sunnyvale) 52–51	Woodside Priory def. Fresno Christian 83–66	International (San Francisco) def. Diamond Ranch (Pomona) 71–52
2026	Sierra Canyon def. Salesian (Richmond) 78-70	Damien def. Folsom 58-55	San Joaquin Memorial (Fresno) def. Bakersfield Christian 46-45	Cornerstone Christian (Antioch) def. Birmingham (Los Angeles) 74-64	Sacred Heart Prep (Atherton) def. San Juan Hills (San Juan Capistrano) 47-45	San Marin (Novato) def. Coalinga 89-64

=== Girls ===
Year	Open Division	Division I	Division II	Division III	Division IV	Division V
1981	Not awarded	Locke (Los Angeles) def. Lynbrook (San Jose) 73–61	Not awarded	Not awarded		
1982	Not awarded	Riverside Poly def. Los Gatos 77–44	Drake (San Anselmo) def. Mission Viejo 58–53	Not awarded		
1983	Not awarded	Buena (Ventura) def. Grant (Sacramento) 55–43	Anderson def. La Reina (Thousand Oaks) 42–39	Colfax def. Marshall Fundamental (Pasadena) 63–52	Not awarded	
1984	Not awarded	Buena (Ventura) def. Los Gatos 37–30	Point Loma def. Pleasant Valley (Chico) 64–55	Colfax def. Woodlake 65–43	Not awarded	
1985	Not awarded	Point Loma def. Wilson (San Francisco) 53–48	Pleasant Valley (Chico) def. El Camino (Oceanside) 63–49	Woodlake def. Justin-Siena (Napa) 59–57 OT	Not awarded	
1986	Not awarded	Point Loma def. Grant (Sacramento) 56–50	Novato def. Chino 72–65	Calaveras (San Andreas) def. Woodlake 53–47	Not awarded	
1987	Not awarded	Point Loma def. Grant (Sacramento) 60–44	Red Bluff def. Valley Christian (Cerritos) 69–57	Willows def. Woodlake 49–33	Not awarded	
1988	Not awarded	Fremont (Oakland) def. Morningside (Inglewood) 53–52	Grant (Sacramento) def. Palos Verdes 52–49	Burlingame def. Lemoore 67–31	Willows def. Chowchilla 82–58	Ripon Christian def. Avenal 53–36
1989	Not awarded	Morningside (Inglewood) def. Fremont (Oakland) 60–50	Grant (Sacramento) def. Katella (Anaheim) 59–43	Brea Olinda def. Mercy (San Francisco) 70–46	Anderson def. Wasco 53–30	Menlo School def. Mission Prep (San Luis Obispo) 52–41
1990	Not awarded	Morningside (Inglewood) def. Berkeley 67–56	San Ramon Valley def. John Muir (Pasadena) 47–44	Placer (Auburn) def. Brea Olinda 54–43	Campolindo (Moraga) def. St. Joseph (Santa Maria) 41–40	Menlo School def. Rosamond 53–27
1991	Not awarded	Berkeley def. Morningside (Inglewood) 76–50	Brea Olinda def. Moreau Catholic (Hayward) 54–46	Palos Verdes def. Healdsburg 58–42	St. Joseph (Santa Maria) def. San Rafael 46–41 OT	Menlo School def. Christian (El Cajon) 65–48
1992	Not awarded	Peninsula (Rolling Hills) def. Monta Vista (Cupertino) 63–44	Moreau Catholic (Hayward) def. Bishop Montgomery (Torrance) 73–66 2OT	Brea Olinda def. Healdsburg 47–44	Ursuline (Santa Rosa) def. Santa Ynez 61–59	Christian (El Cajon) def. Ripon Christian 45–43
1993	Not awarded	Lynwood def. Balboa (San Francisco) 65–51	Brea Olinda def. Bella Vista (Fair Oaks) 42–41	St. Francis (Sacramento) def. Costa Mesa 50–43	St. Bernard def. Bear River (Grass Valley) 59–48	Sacred Heart Prep (Atherton) def. Christian (El Cajon) 59–39
1994	Not awarded	Sacred Heart Prep (Atherton) def. Lynwood 59–53	El Camino (Sacramento) def. Woodbridge (Irvine) 71–38	Brea Olinda def. Archbishop Mitty 54–44	St. Bernard def. Bear River (Grass Valley) 53–43	Ripon Christian def. Christian (El Cajon) 60–46
1995	Not awarded	Sacred Heart Prep (Atherton) def. Mater Dei (Santa Ana) 52–50	Woodbridge (Irvine) def. El Camino (Sacramento) 55–40	Archbishop Mitty def. Newbury Park 64–56	Campolindo (Moraga) def. Valley Christian (Cerritos) 62–37	Christian (El Cajon) def. Ripon Christian 49–47
1996	Not awarded	Mater Dei (Santa Ana) def. Archbishop Mitty 59–48	Woodbridge (Irvine) def. El Camino (Sacramento) 51–44	Bishop Montgomery (Torrance) def. Bear River (Grass Valley) 46–42	Campolindo (Moraga) def. Valley Christian (Cerritos) 77–60	Sacred Heart Prep (Atherton) def. Mission Prep (San Luis Obispo) 64–52
1997	Not awarded	Berkeley def. Crenshaw (Los Angeles) 57–44	Laguna Hills def. Newark Memorial 41–40	Bishop Montgomery (Torrance) def. Acalanes (Lafayette) 46–43	Campolindo (Moraga) def. St. Bernard 68–54	Rincon Valley Christian def. Christian (El Cajon) 53–38
1998	Not awarded	Narbonne (Harbor City) def. Berkeley 67–46 (Championship vacated)	Brea Olinda def. Shasta (Redding) 51–32	Sacred Heart Cathedral def. Alemany (Mission Hills) 67–54	St. Bernard def. Colfax 61–57	Modoc (Alturas) def. Mission Prep (San Luis Obispo) 67–53
1999	Not awarded	Archbishop Mitty def. Palisades (Pacific Palisades) 49–48	Brea Olinda def. Amador Valley (Pleasanton) 54–51	Acalanes (Lafayette) def. Harvard-Westlake 47–42	Sacred Heart Prep (Atherton) def. Calvary Chapel (Santa Ana) 48–43	Pinewood def. Chadwick (Palos Verdes) 61–45
2000	Not awarded	Narbonne (Harbor City) def. Berkeley 64–52	Brea Olinda def. Amador Valley (Pleasanton) 47–34	Bishop Montgomery (Torrance) def. Petaluma 57–45	St. Mary's (Stockton) def. St. Bernard 72–57	Redwood Christian def. Santa Fe Christian (Solana Beach) 34–33
2001	Not awarded	Narbonne (Harbor City) def. Berkeley 48–45	Hanford def. Amador Valley (Pleasanton) 64–56	Bishop Montgomery (Torrance) def. Sacred Heart Cathedral 48–38	The Bishop's School def. St. Mary's (Stockton) 59–54	La Jolla Country Day def. Redwood Christian 69–57
2002	Not awarded	Lynwood def. Kennedy (Sacramento) 74–55	St. Mary's (Stockton) def. Redondo Union	Bishop Montgomery (Torrance) def. Miramonte (Orinda) 60–55	Marin Catholic def. St. Bernard 72–57	La Jolla Country Day def. Modesto Christian 53–49
2003	Not awarded	Lynwood def. Archbishop Mitty 55–40	Troy (Fullerton) def. Vacaville 53–40	Bishop Montgomery (Torrance) def. Sacred Heart Cathedral 49–43	St. Mary's (Stockton) def. La Jolla Country Day 56–51	Covenant of Sacred Heart (San Francisco) def. Mission Prep (San Luis Obispo) 68–59
2004	Not awarded	Oakland Tech def. San Diego 58–54	Carondelet (Concord) def. Troy (Fullerton) 48–41	St. Mary's (Stockton) def. Bishop Amat 54–45	Piedmont def. La Jolla Country Day 60–51	Forest Lake Christian def. Mission Prep (San Luis Obispo) 65–47
2005	Not awarded	Oakland Tech def. Canyon Springs (Moreno Valley) 64–63	Troy (Fullerton) def. Archbishop Mitty 47–41	Bishop Amat def. St. Mary's (Stockton) 56–53	Piedmont def. Brentwood (Los Angeles) 82–44	Pinewood def. Pacific Hills 61–39
2006	Not awarded	Long Beach Poly def. Berkeley 54–34	Troy (Fullerton) def. Carondelet (Concord) 51–46	Bishop Amat def. Sacramento 53–39	Sacred Heart Cathedral def. Windward 66–56 OT	Pinewood def. Pacific Hills 58–52
2007	Not awarded	Long Beach Poly def. Berkeley 58–52	Archbishop Mitty def. Brea Olinda 54–49	Sacred Heart Cathedral def. Bishop Amat 60–54 OT	Marlborough (Los Angeles) def. St. Patrick-St. Vincent 67–52	Branson (Ross) def. Pacific Hills 51–36
2008	Not awarded	Long Beach Poly def. Berkeley 55–31	Archbishop Mitty def. Mira Costa (Manhattan Beach) 59–49 OT	Sacred Heart Cathedral def. Magnolia (Anaheim) 48–33	St. Patrick-St. Vincent def. La Jolla Country 67–65	Branson (Ross) def. Mission Prep (San Luis Obispo) 51–39
2009	Not awarded	Long Beach Poly def. Monte Vista 57–33	Brea Olinda def. Carondelet (Concord) 68–45	St. Mary's (Stockton) def. Inglewood 71–62	Mater Dei Catholic def. Modesto Christian 54–51	Bellarmine-Jefferson (Burbank) def. Pinewood 55–47
2010	Not awarded	Oak Ridge (El Dorado Hills) def. Long Beach Poly 55–42	Mater Dei (Santa Ana) def. Carondelet (Concord) 58–43	St. Mary's (Stockton) def. Bishop Amat 89–41	Harvard-Westlake def. St. Mary's (Berkeley) 58–44	Pinewood def. St. Anthony 62–44
2011	Not awarded	Mater Dei (Santa Ana) def. Berkeley 59–47	St. Mary's (Stockton) def. Rialto 64–48	St. Joseph def. Bishop O'Dowd (Oakland) 53–42	Windward def. St. Mary's (Berkeley) 51–47	Pinewood def. St. Bernard 67–56
2012	Not awarded	Mater Dei (Santa Ana) def. Berkeley 57–40	Archbishop Mitty def. J.W. North (Riverside) 56–43	Bishop O'Dowd (Oakland) def. Laguna Hills 62–24	La Jolla Country Day def. Salesian (Richmond) 72–41	Brookside Christian def. Mission Prep (San Luis Obispo) 70–64
2013	Bishop O'Dowd (Oakland) def. Windward 60–45	Long Beach Poly def. Berkeley 46–28	Lynwood def. St. Francis (Mountain View) 39–26	Bishop Alemany (Mission Hills) def. Sacred Heart Cathedral 46–40	Serra (Gardena) def. Salesian (Richmond) 62–60	Sierra Canyon def. Pinewood 47–33
2014	Long Beach Poly def. Salesian (Richmond) 70–52	Canyon Springs (Moreno Valley) def. Pleasant Grove 56–30	Chaminade def. Archbishop Mitty 80–51	Modesto Christian def. Santa Barbara 64–55	Sierra Canyon def. Justin-Siena (Napa) 64–37	Pinewood def. La Jolla Country 60–42
2015	St. Mary's (Stockton) def. Mater Dei (Santa Ana) 76–69	McClatchy def. Serra (Gardena) 65–61 2OT	Archbishop Mitty def. Mark Keppel 53–31	Bishop O'Dowd (Oakland) def. Brea Olinda 55–40	Sierra Canyon def. Brookside Christian 69–56	La Jolla Country def. Eastside College Prep 40–36
2016	Chaminade def. Miramonte (Orinda) 80–71	Brea Olinda def. St. Francis (Sacramento) 64–51	Cajon def. Elk Grove 55–36	Sacred Heart Cathedral def. Lakeside 50–47	Cardinal Newman (Santa Rosa) def. Antelope Valley 39–37	Eastside College Prep def. Village Christian 57–50
2017	Clovis West def. Archbishop Mitty 44–40	Windward def. McClatchy 53–41	Vanden (Fairfield) def. Mater Dei (Santa Ana) 64–61	Rosary Academy def. Campolindo (Moraga) 62–45	West Campus def. Los Osos 63–55	Eastside College Prep def. Rolling Hills Prep 63–40
2018	Windward def. Pinewood 58–47	Serra (Gardena) def. Sacred Heart Cathedral 70–53	Redondo Union def. Pleasant Valley (Chico) 57–42	West Campus def. Sunny Hills 75–47	Rolling Hills Prep def. Woodside Priory 57–53	Sierra Pacific def. Lowell 52–26
2019	Sierra Canyon def. Pinewood 69–51	Rosary Academy def. Bishop O'Dowd (Oakland) 75–58	Menlo School def. Rolling Hills Prep 70–63	Oakland def. McFarland 51–35	Oakland Tech def. Northview 55–27	Caruthers def. Ramona (Riverside) 62–38
2020	La Jolla Country Day vs. Archbishop Mitty	Rosary Academy vs. Bishop O'Dowd (Oakland)	Palisades vs. Oakland Tech	Paloma Valley vs. St. Mary's (Berkeley)	Lancaster vs. Sierra Pacific	East Bakersfield vs. Branson (Ross)
2021	Not awarded					
2022	Sierra Canyon def. Archbishop Mitty 85–61	Salesian (Richmond) def. Windward 62–51	Sage Hill (Newport Coast) def. San Joaquin Memorial (Fresno) 51–47	Oakland Tech def. La Salle (Pasadena) 39–33	Branson (Ross) def. Imperial 46–23	San Domenico vs. Shalhevet (Los Angeles) 38–27
2023	Etiwanda def. Archbishop Mitty 69–67	Oakland Tech def. Santiago (Corona) 75–52	Central (Fresno) def. Bonita Vista 52–41	Los Osos def. Colfax 65–48	Shalhevet (Los Angeles) def. San Domenico 50–46	Bret Harte def. Marina (Huntington Beach) 62–39
2024	Etiwanda def. Archbishop Mitty 60–48	Bishop Montgomery (Torrance) def. Bishop O'Dowd (Oakland) 52–40	Harvard-Westlake def. Colfax 60–45	Caruthers def. Granada Hills Charter 54–48	St. Bernard's (Eureka) def. Grossmont (El Cajon) 47–29	Oakland def. Montgomery (San Diego) 56–50
2025	Etiwanda def. Archbishop Mitty 75–59	Carondelet (Concord) def. Sage Hill (Newport Coast) 51–48	Caruthers def. Rancho Bernardo 56–37	Marin Catholic def. Mater Dei Catholic 48–38	Whitney (Cerritos) def. Half Moon Bay 48–40	Woodland Christian def. Rosamond 47–41
2026	Ontario Christian def. Archbishop Mitty 56-49	Centennial (Corona) def. Clovis 73-66	Sierra Pacific def. St. Joseph (Santa Maria) 56-47	El Dorado (Placentia) def. Valley Christian (San Jose) 42-40	Faith Christian (Yuba City) def. Palisades 51-37	Woodland Christian def. Laguna Hills 63-30

== Northern California champions ==
=== Boys ===
Year	Open Division	Division I	Division II	Division III	Division IV	Division V	Division VI
1982	Not awarded	Washington (San Francisco) def. Bishop O'Dowd (Oakland) 74–73	Drake (San Anselmo) def. Enterprise (Redding) 60–44	Cloverdale def. Vanden (Fairfield) 67–54	Not awarded		
1983	Not awarded	Bishop O'Dowd (Oakland) def. Fremont (Sunnyvale) 57–39	Menlo School def. Modesto 50–34	Cloverdale def. Benicia 72–55	Not awarded		
1984	Not awarded	St. Ignatius (San Francisco) def. Amador Valley (Pleasanton) 58–57	Modesto def. Hayward 60–52	Cloverdale def. Gridley 77–64	Not awarded		
1985	Not awarded	James Logan def. Fremont (Oakland) 71–55	Rio Americano def. North Salinas 53–46	Folsom def. Bret Harte (Angels Camp) 43–41	Not awarded		
1986	Not awarded	Bishop O'Dowd (Oakland) def. James Logan 62–48	Aptos def. Mt. Eden (Hayward) 75–71	Vanden (Fairfield) def. McCloud 72–48	Not awarded		
1987	Not awarded	Ygnacio Valley def. James Logan 56–54	De Anza (Richmond) def. Aptos 72–65	Colusa def. Pinewood 65–41	Not awarded		
1988	Not awarded	Bishop O'Dowd (Oakland) def. St. Joseph Notre Dame 42–31	Menlo-Atherton def. Ygnacio Valley 85–76	Jefferson (Daly City) def. Las Lomas (Walnut Creek) 69–56	Terra Linda (San Rafael) def. St. Patrick-St. Vincent 67–60	Ripon Christian def. Menlo School 68–60 OT	Not awarded
1989	Not awarded	Skyline (Oakland) def. McAteer (San Francisco) 72–63	Menlo-Atherton def. San Ramon Valley 85–71	Central Valley (Shasta Lake) def. Del Oro 58–51	Cardinal Newman (Santa Rosa) def. Archbishop Mitty 62–57	Menlo School def. Quincy 56–52	Not awarded
1990	Not awarded	Archbishop Riordan (San Francisco) def. Skyline (Oakland) 80–60	Fremont (Sunnyvale) def. Jesuit (Carmichael) 53–47	Mt. Eden (Hayward) def. American (Fremont) 45–37	Vanden (Fairfield) def. Tamalpais (Mill Valley) 64–58	Colusa def. Denair 81–79	Not awarded
1991	Not awarded	St. Joseph Notre Dame def. Bishop O'Dowd (Oakland) 75–59	San Ramon Valley def. Jesuit (Carmichael) 65–51	Washington (Fremont) def. Mt. Eden (Hayward) 56–54 OT	Hayward def. Vanden (Fairfield) 72–45	University (San Francisco) def. Colusa 74–73	Not awarded
1992	Not awarded	St. Joseph Notre Dame def. Jesuit (Carmichael) 78–73	San Ramon Valley def. Mt. Eden (Hayward) 82–52	Seaside def. Hayward 91–82	Palma def. Cardinal Newman (Santa Rosa) 56–47	Ripon Christian def. Hoopa Valley 83–57	Not awarded
1993	Not awarded	Jesuit (Carmichael) def. De La Salle (Concord) 45–37	Amador Valley (Pleasanton) def. St. Francis (Mountain View) 61–55	Palo Alto def. San Juan (Fair Oaks) 81–68	Palma def. Archbishop Mitty 30–27	Emery (Emeryville) def. Branson (Ross) 60–35	Not awarded
1994	Not awarded	Jesuit (Carmichael) def. Fremont (Oakland) 79–72	Oakmont (Roseville) def. Amador Valley (Pleasanton) 60–26	Foothill (Sacramento) def. San Lorenzo 70–56	Drake (San Anselmo) def. Vanden (Fairfield) 46–33	Ripon Christian def. Delta (Clarksburg) 60–58	Not awarded
1995	Not awarded	Fremont (Oakland) def. Merced 95–81	St. Francis (Mountain View) def. Woodside 60–46	Northgate (Walnut Creek) def. Hayward 56–40	Capuchino (San Bruno) def. Drake (San Anselmo) 51–48	University (San Francisco) def. Rincon Valley Christian 74–62	Not awarded
1996	Not awarded	De La Salle (Concord) def. Jesuit (Carmichael) 48–47	Northgate (Walnut Creek) def. Woodside 61–51	Grant (Sacramento) def. Granada (Livermore) 59–58	Cardinal Newman (Santa Rosa) def. Vanden (Fairfield) 53–45	St. Elizabeth (Oakland) def. St. Bernard's (Eureka) 61–59	Not awarded
1997	Not awarded	St. Joseph Notre Dame def. Fremont (Oakland) 76–65	Shasta (Redding) def. Vacaville 57–44	Hillsdale (San Mateo) def. Arcata 61–42	Encina (Sacramento) def. San Rafael 60–48	Modesto Christian def. Fremont Christian 80–56	Not awarded
1998	Not awarded	St. Joseph Notre Dame def. Vallejo 57–50	Montgomery (Santa Rosa) def. St. Francis (Mountain View) 63–57	Enterprise (Redding) def. Del Oro 49–31	Pacific Grove def. Modesto Christian 55–54	Brookside Christian (Stockton) def. Rincon Valley Christian 47–46	Not awarded
1999	Not awarded	Fremont (Oakland) def. De La Salle (Concord) 55–50	Grant (Sacramento) def. Chico 70–51	El Cerrito def. Acalanes (Lafayette) 48–41	Christian Brothers (Sacramento) def. Colfax 55–53	Calvary Temple Christian (Modesto) def. Hoopa Valley 98–81	Not awarded
2000	Not awarded	De La Salle (Concord) def. Jesuit (Carmichael) 44–36	Newark Memorial def. St. Francis (Mountain View) 55–46	Foothill (Pleasanton) def. Natomas (Sacramento) 68–55	Tamalpais (Mill Valley) def. Modesto Christian 73–60	Hoopa Valley def. Branson (Ross) 64–45	Not awarded
2001	Not awarded	Modesto Christian def. De La Salle (Concord) 72–53	St. Francis (Mountain View) def. Hayward 72–63	Archbishop Riordan (San Francisco) def. McAteer (San Francisco) 70–46	St. Mary's (Berkeley) def. Monte Vista Christian (Watsonville) 79–63	St. Elizabeth (Oakland) def. Capital Christian 60–39	Not awarded
2002	Not awarded	Oakland Tech def. De La Salle (Concord) 65–61 OT	St. Francis (Mountain View) def. Rio Americano 66–46	Archbishop Riordan (San Francisco) def. Sacred Heart Cathedral 67–61	Valley Christian (San Jose) def. Wheatland 56–45	University (San Francisco) def. Eastside Prep 57–45	Not awarded
2003	Not awarded	Oakland Tech def. Valley (Sacramento) 60–48	Woodcreek def. Montgomery (Santa Rosa) 65–56	Foothill (Sacramento) def. Archbishop Mitty 52–35	Hercules def. Monte Vista Christian (Watsonville) 75–64	Modesto Christian def. Eastside Prep 39–38	Not awarded
2004	Not awarded	De La Salle (Concord) def. Sheldon 67–48	Hayward def. Valley (Sacramento) 71–57	Bishop O'Dowd (Oakland) def. St. Ignatius (San Francisco) 48–26	St. Joseph Notre Dame def. Valley Christian (San Jose) 61–35	Modesto Christian def. Branson (Ross) 58–47	Not awarded
2005	Not awarded	Serra (San Mateo) def. Castlemont (Oakland) 65–59	Oak Ridge (El Dorado Hills) def. Palo Alto 55–35	Santa Cruz def. Campolindo (Moraga) 46–44	St. Mary's (Berkeley) def. Marin Catholic 66–52	Branson (Ross) def. Modesto Christian 60–48	Not awarded
2006	Not awarded	De La Salle (Concord) def. Tokay (Lodi) 65–52	Palo Alto def. Archbishop Mitty 45–43	St. Mary's (Stockton) def. Sacramento 37–35	Sacred Heart Cathedral def. Salesian (Richmond) 49–47	Branson (Ross) def. Modesto Christian 53–52	Not awarded
2007	Not awarded	McClymonds def. Oak Grove (San Jose) 69–68 OT	Archbishop Mitty def. Jesuit (Carmichael) 77–64	Bishop O'Dowd (Oakland) def. Acalanes (Lafayette) 55–51	Cardinal Newman (Santa Rosa) def. St. Mary's (Berkeley) 58–54	Branson (Ross) def. Modesto Christian 50–47	Not awarded
2008	Not awarded	McClymonds def. De La Salle (Concord) 50–37	Archbishop Mitty def. Fairfield 76–56	Sacramento def. Sacred Heart Cathedral 65–49	St. Mary's (Berkeley) def. Modesto Christian 82–70	Branson (Ross) def. Lick-Wilmerding (San Francisco) 45–28	Not awarded
2009	Not awarded	McClymonds def. Monte Vista (Danville) 46–43	Rocklin def. St. Francis (Mountain View) 70–65	Sacred Heart Cathedral def. Sacramento 77–65	Salesian (Richmond) def. St. Mary's (Berkeley) 56–52	St. Joseph Notre Dame def. Branson (Ross) 42–40	Not awarded
2010	Not awarded	Newark Memorial def. De La Salle (Concord) 58–49	St. Francis (Mountain View) def. Woodcreek 48–47	Bishop O'Dowd (Oakland) def. Sacramento 57–50	St. Mary's (Berkeley) def. Salesian 54–50	Branson (Ross) def. University (San Francisco) 62–44	Not awarded
2011	Not awarded	De La Salle (Concord) def. Castro Valley 49–43	Archbishop Mitty def. Woodcreek 67–44	Bishop O'Dowd (Oakland) def. El Cerrito 61–57	Salesian (Richmond) def. St. Mary's (Berkeley) 59–53	St. Joseph Notre Dame def. University (San Francisco) 61–43	Not awarded
2012	Not awarded	Sheldon def. Jesuit (Carmichael) 61–56	Archbishop Mitty def. Newark Memorial 63–58	Sacred Heart Cathedral def. Bishop O'Dowd (Oakland) 61–57	Salesian (Richmond) def. Sacred Heart Prep (Atherton) 69–38	St. Joseph Notre Dame def. Pinewood 77–53	Not awarded
2013	Archbishop Mitty def. Sheldon 70–50	Pleasant Grove High School def. Deer Valley 73–60	College Park (Pleasant Hill) def. Dublin 93–90 OT	Sacred Heart Cathedral def. Campolindo (Moraga) 55–52 OT	Cardinal Newman (Santa Rosa) def. Archbishop Riordan 73–66	St. Joseph Notre Dame def. Capital Christian 50–36	Not awarded
2014	Bishop O'Dowd (Oakland) def. Capital Christian 70–60	Monte Vista (Danville) def. Freedom 59–51	Folsom def. Cosumnes Oaks 68–51	Drake (San Anselmo) def. Archbishop Riordan 59–54	Moreau Catholic (Hayward) def. Salesian (Richmond) 61–52	St. Joseph Notre Dame def. Central Catholic 54–42	Not awarded
2015	Bishop O'Dowd (Oakland) def. Modesto Christian 56–47	San Ramon Valley def. Woodcreek 49–45	Archbishop Mitty def. Sacramento 54–40	Campolindo (Moraga) def. Drake (San Anselmo) 50–44	Capital Christian def. St. Mary's (Berkeley) 60–47	University (San Francisco) def. Brookside Christian 65–50	Liberty Christian def. Paradise Adventist Academy 56–34
2016	De La Salle (Concord) def. Modesto Christian 41–40	Berkeley def. Menlo-Atherton 61–51	Serra (San Mateo) def. El Cerrito 59–53	Manteca def. Bishop O'Dowd (Oakland) 70–45	Palma def. West Campus 58–56	St. Joseph Notre Dame def. Stuart Hall 67–58 3OT	St. Bernard's (Eureka) def. Stockton Christian 60–56
2017	Woodcreek def. Sheldon 66–59	James Logan def. Palo Alto 65–61 OT	Moreau Catholic (Hayward) def. St. Francis (Mountain View) 81–77 OT	Mission def. Vanden (Fairfield) 72–68	St. Patrick-St. Vincent def. Palma 73–48	St. Francis (Watsonville) def. Elliot Christian 69–64	Fall River def. Liberty Christian 75–36
2018	Sheldon def. Bishop O'Dowd (Oakland) 61–60	Las Lomas (Walnut Creek) def. Palo Alto 44–41	Alameda def. St. Mary's (Stockton) 76–66 OT	Pleasant Valley (Chico) def. Central Catholic 62–53	Stuart Hall def. St. Mary's (Berkeley) 68–62 OT	Argonaut def. Colfax 72–57	Sacramento Adventist def. Ripon Christian 57–47
2019	Sheldon def. Modesto Christian 58–48	James Logan def. Branson (Ross) 54–49	Campolindo (Moraga) def. Serra (San Mateo) 59–38	University (San Francisco) def. Monterey 44–41	Immanuel def. Wood (Vacaville) 60–48	Mt. Shasta def. Dinuba 80–56	Cornerstone Christian (Antioch) def. Redding Christian 59–57
2020	Sheldon vs. Bishop O'Dowd (Oakland)	Campolindo (Moraga) def. De La Salle (Concord) 54–49	Weston Ranch def. St. Patrick-St. Vincent 62–61	St. Mary's (Berkeley) def. Carmel 68–53	Brookside Christian (Stockton) def. Lincoln (San Francisco) by default (Note: Lincoln (San Francisco) withdrew due to the COVID-19 pandemic and Brookside Christian was declared the NorCal Boys Division 4 Champion by default)	San Domenico def. Pierce (Arbuckle) 58–37	Ripon Christian def. Weed 79–42
2021	Not awarded						
2022	Modesto Christian def. Campolindo (Moraga) 56–53	Clovis North def. St. Ignatius (San Francisco) 58–56	Elk Grove def. Branson (Ross) 60–54	Pleasant Valley (Chico) def. Bullard (Fresno) 56–37	Justin-Siena (Napa) def. Liberty Ranch (Galt) 43–38	Stuart Hall def. Woodside Priory 44–37	St. Bernard's (Eureka) def. Weed 48–34
2023	St. Joseph (Santa Maria) def. Modesto Christian 72–58	Granada (Livermore) def. Salesian (Richmond) 60–47	San Joaquin Memorial (Fresno) def. Vanden (Fairfield) 67–61	Oakland def. Oakland Tech 77–61	Half Moon Bay def. Chico 71–59	Sierra (Tollhouse) def. Ripon Christian 47–41	San Francisco Waldorf def. Valley Christian (Roseville) 110–84
2024	Salesian (Richmond) def. Archbishop Riordan 49–44	San Ramon Valley def. Granada (Livermore) 58–55	Oakland Tech def. Oakland 73–66	Santa Cruz def. Bullard (Fresno) 61–56	Monterey def. Union Mine 73–52	Athenian (Danville) def. San Domenico 57–46	Cornerstone Christian (Antioch) def. Napa Christian 84–59
2025	Archbishop Riordan def. De La Salle (Concord) 52–40	Lincoln (Stockton) def. San Ramon Valley 66–58	Jesuit (Carmichael) def. Destiny Christian Academy 65–55	The King's Academy (Sunnyvale) def. Palo Alto 70–65	Woodside Priory def. Santa Cruz 60–48	International (San Francisco) def. Fortune Early College (Sacramento) 71–63	St. Bernard's (Eureka) def. Redding Christian 48–46
2026	Salesian (Richmond) def. Archbishop Riordan 59-54 OT	Folsom def. The King's Academy (Sunnyvale) 78-68	San Joaquin Memorial (Fresno) def. Oakland Tech 74-44	Cornerstone Christian (Antioch) def. Woodside Priory 73-65	Sacred Heart Prep (Atherton) def. Half Moon Bay 53-51	San Marin (Novato) def. Mission San Jose (Fremont) 56-46	Redding Christian def. St. Vincent de Paul (Petaluma) 74-37

=== Girls ===
Year	Open Division	Division I	Division II	Division III	Division IV	Division V	Division VI
1982	Not awarded	Los Gatos def. Norte Del Rio (Sacramento) 46–43	Drake (San Anselmo) def. Campolindo (Moraga) 60–55	Willows def. Cloverdale 62–49	Not awarded		
1983	Not awarded	Grant (Sacramento) def. Cordova 61–40	Anderson def. Aptos 50–45	Colfax def. Cloverdale 68–54	Not awarded		
1984	Not awarded	Los Gatos def. Castlemont (Oakland) 54–32	Pleasant Valley (Chico) def. Campolindo (Moraga) 65–63	Colfax def. Justin-Siena (Napa) 58–28	Not awarded		
1985	Not awarded	Wilson (San Francisco) def. Woodland 55–42	Pleasant Valley (Chico) def. McKinleyville 46–45	Justin-Siena (Napa) def. Hughson 35–32	Not awarded		
1986	Not awarded	Grant (Sacramento) def. Bella Vista (Fair Oaks) 55–46	Novato def. Red Bluff 57–54	Calaveras def. Hughson 51–36	Not awarded		
1987	Not awarded	Grant (Sacramento) def. Washington (Fremont) 72–66	Red Bluff def. Roseville 59–53	Willows def. McKinleyville 52–49	Not awarded		
1988	Not awarded	Fremont (Oakland) def. James Logan 37–35	Grant (Sacramento) def. Leland (San Jose) 54–45	Burlingame def. Sonora 45–29	Willows def. Archbishop Mitty 50–45	Ripon Christian def. Sacred Heart Prep (Atherton) 50–48	Not awarded
1989	Not awarded	Fremont (Oakland) def. Miramonte (Orinda) 50–47	Grant (Sacramento) def. Eureka 67–55	Mercy (Burlingame) def. Placer (Auburn) 43–39	Anderson def. Archbishop Mitty 60–47	Menlo School def. Clear Lake 63–46	Not awarded
1990	Not awarded	Berkeley def. Nevada Union (Grass Valley) 72–44	San Ramon Valley def. Moreau Catholic (Hayward) 59–51	Placer (Auburn) def. Lynbrook (San Jose) 60–39	Campolindo (Moraga) def. Ursuline (Santa Rosa) 53–48	Menlo School def. Sacred Heart Prep (Atherton) 62–52	Not awarded
1991	Not awarded	Berkeley def. Archbishop Mitty 69–53	Moreau Catholic (Hayward) def. El Camino (Sacramento) 74–57	Healdsburg def. St. Francis (Sacramento) 62–58	San Rafael def. Campolindo (Moraga) 55–51	Menlo School def. Upper Lake 65–40	Not awarded
1992	Not awarded	Monta Vista (Cupertino) def. Berkeley 56–50	Moreau Catholic (Hayward) def. Del Campo (Fair Oaks) 61–52	Healdsburg def. Westmont (Campbell) 52–51	Ursuline (Santa Rosa) def. San Rafael 44–39	Ripon Christian def. Sacred Heart Prep (Atherton) 54–46	Not awarded
1993	Not awarded	Balboa (San Francisco) def. Berkeley 70–61	Bella Vista (Fair Oaks) def. El Camino (Sacramento) 53–47	St. Francis (Sacramento) def. Pleasant Valley (Chico) 52–47	Bear River (Grass Valley) def. Campolindo (Moraga) 47–45	Sacred Heart Prep (Atherton) def. Upper Lake 66–40	Not awarded
1994	Not awarded	Sacred Heart Prep (Atherton) def. Monta Vista (Cupertino) 63–37	El Camino (Sacramento) def. Amador Valley (Pleasanton) 60–26	Archbishop Mitty def. Novato 58–57	Bear River (Grass Valley) def. Campolindo (Moraga) 51–43	Ripon Christian def. St. Elizabeth (Oakland) 74–59	Not awarded
1995	Not awarded	Sacred Heart Prep (Atherton) def. Nevada Union (Grass Valley) 53–35	El Camino (Sacramento) def. Amador Valley (Pleasanton) 59–56	Archbishop Mitty def. Novato 65–42	Campolindo (Moraga) def. Bear River (Grass Valley) 57–46	Ripon Christian def. Southfork (Miranda) 58–42	Not awarded
1996	Not awarded	Archbishop Mitty def. Fairfield 61–41	El Camino (Sacramento) def. Del Campo (Fair Oaks) 67–55	Bear River (Grass Valley) def. St. Ignatius (San Francisco) 52–37	Campolindo (Moraga) def. Terra Nova (Pacifica) 51–46	Sacred Heart Prep (Atherton) def. Ripon Christian 44–42	Not awarded
1997	Not awarded	Berkeley def. Monte Vista (Danville) 56–49	Newark Memorial def. Del Campo (Fair Oaks) 52–44	Acalanes (Lafayette) def. Bear River (Grass Valley) 55–52	Campolindo (Moraga) def. Justin-Siena (Napa) 59–50	Rincon Valley Christian def. Modoc (Alturas) 58–28	Not awarded
1998	Not awarded	Berkeley def. Archbishop Mitty 62–44	Shasta (Redding) def. Del Campo (Fair Oaks) 51–49	Sacred Heart Cathedral def. Acalanes (Lafayette) 56–50	Colfax def. Marin Catholic 49–32	Modoc (Alturas) def. Pinewood 52–42	Not awarded
1999	Not awarded	Archbishop Mitty def. Berkeley 61–53	Amador Valley (Pleasanton) def. Homestead (Cupertino) 63–41	Acalanes (Lafayette) def. Del Oro 37–22	Sacred Heart Prep (Atherton) def. St. Mary's (Stockton) 47–36	Pinewood def. Branson (Ross) 74–43	Not awarded
2000	Not awarded	Berkeley def. Archbishop Mitty 63–61	Amador Valley (Pleasanton) def. Carondelet (Concord) 63–56	Petaluma def. Sacred Heart Cathedral 54–38	St. Mary's (Stockton) def. Sacred Heart Prep (Atherton) 49–40	Redwood Christian def. Pinewood 42–31	Not awarded
2001	Not awarded	Berkeley def. Oakland 55–40	Amador Valley (Pleasanton) def. Pinewood 46–37	Sacred Heart Cathedral def. Alhambra (Martinez) 47–41	St. Mary's (Stockton) def. Marin Catholic 57–45	Redwood Christian vs. Ripon Christian 55–42	Not awarded
2002	Not awarded	Kennedy (Sacramento) def. Archbishop Mitty 59–57	St. Mary's (Stockton) def. Pinewood 66–54	Miramonte (Orinda) def. Sacred Heart Cathedral 63–49	Marin Catholic def. Ursuline (Santa Rosa) 60–47	Modesto Christian def. Ripon Christian 51–36	Not awarded
2003	Not awarded	Archbishop Mitty def. Laguna Creek (Elk Grove) 76–55	Vacaville def. Pinewood 58–49	Sacred Heart Cathedral def. Presentation (San Jose) 37–23	St. Mary's (Stockton) def. Piedmont 64–54	Covenant of Sacred Heart (San Francisco) def. Eastside College Prep 53–45	Not awarded
2004	Not awarded	Oakland Tech def. Laguna Creek (Elk Grove) 52–49	Carondelet (Concord) def. Archbishop Mitty 56–43	St. Mary's (Stockton) def. Sacred Heart Cathedral 57–43	Piedmont def. St. Mary's (Berkeley) 46–38	Forest Lake Christian def. Modesto Christian 53–45	Not awarded
2005	Not awarded	Oakland Tech def. Fairfield 77–49	Archbishop Mitty def. Carondelet (Concord) 63–47	St. Mary's (Stockton) def. Miramonte (Orinda) 64–53	Piedmont def. Sacred Heart Cathedral 72–44	Pinewood def. Forest Lake Christian 60–40	Not awarded
2006	Not awarded	Berkeley def. Napa 66–28	Carondelet (Concord) def. Pinole Valley 52–35	Sacramento def. St. Ignatius (San Francisco) 53–45 OT	Sacred Heart Cathedral def. Piedmont 61–44	Pinewood def. Sacred Heart Prep (Atherton) 59–33	Not awarded
2007	Not awarded	Berkeley def. McClatchy (Sacramento) 66–44	Archbishop Mitty def. Pinole Valley 55–49	Sacred Heart Cathedral def. Sacramento 67–66	St. Patrick-St. Vincent def. Valley Christian (San Jose) 70–57	Branson (Ross) def. Rincon Valley Christian 39–36	Not awarded
2008	Not awarded	Berkeley def. Kennedy (Sacramento) 72–53	Archbishop Mitty def. St. Francis (Sacramento) 51–41	Sacred Heart Cathedral def. St. Mary's (Stockton) 46–45	St. Patrick-St. Vincent def. Justin-Siena (Napa) 65–60	Branson (Ross) def. Eastside College Prep 64–24	Not awarded
2009	Not awarded	Monte Vista (Danville) def. Kennedy (Sacramento) 42–25	Carondelet (Concord) def. Oak Ridge (El Dorado Hills) 60–50	St. Mary's (Stockton) def. Sacred Heart Cathedral 62–60	Modesto Christian def. St. Mary's (Berkeley) 62–57	Pinewood def. Branson (Ross) 41–30	Not awarded
2010	Not awarded	Oak Ridge (El Dorado Hills) def. Berkeley 52–42	Carondelet (Concord) def. Archbishop Mitty 40–38	St. Mary's (Stockton) def. Sacramento 70–45	St. Mary's (Berkeley) def. McKinleyville 52–37	Pinewood def. Bradshaw Christian 53–47	Not awarded
2011	Not awarded	Berkeley def. Carondelet (Concord) 68–57	St. Mary's (Stockton) def. Del Oro 56–48	Bishop O'Dowd (Oakland) def. Sacramento 57–46	St. Mary's (Berkeley) def. Modesto Christian 70–42	Pinewood def. St. Joseph Notre Dame 41–36	Not awarded
2012	Not awarded	Berkeley def. Kennedy (Sacramento) 56–38	Archbishop Mitty def. St. Mary's (Stockton) 53–51	Bishop O'Dowd (Oakland) def. Miramonte (Orinda) 70–51	Salesian (Richmond) def. St. Mary's (Berkeley) 47–44	Brookside Christian def. Eastside College Prep 55–38	Not awarded
2013	Bishop O'Dowd (Oakland) def. St. Mary's (Stockton) 58–50	Berkeley def. Oak Ridge (El Dorado Hills) 56–45	St. Francis (Mountain View) def. Lynbrook 44–19	Sacred Heart Cathedral def. St. Ignatius 46–28	Salesian (Richmond) def. Piedmont 53–43	Pinewood def. Eastside College Prep 48–36	Not awarded
2014	Salesian (Richmond) def. Miramonte (Orinda) 78–64	Pleasant Grove def. Berkeley 51–42	Archbishop Mitty def. McNair 57–54	Modesto Christian def. Enterprise 58–56	Justin-Siena def. Arcata 47–26	Pinewood def. Brookside Christian 61–38	Not awarded
2015	St. Mary's (Stockton) def. Miramonte (Orinda) 67–52	McClatchy (Sacramento) def. Oak Ridge (El Dorado Hills) 58–49	Archbishop Mitty def. Dublin 63–49	Bishop O'Dowd (Oakland) def. Vanden (Fairfield) 72–55	Brookside Christian def. Piedmont 53–45	Eastside College Prep def. Valley Christian (Dublin) 36–28	St. Bernard's (Eureka) def. Fall River 66–54
2016	Miramonte (Orinda) def. Pinewood 73–40	St. Francis (Sacramento) def. Castro Valley 66–52	Elk Grove def. Sacramento 46–45	Sacred Heart Cathedral def. Inderkum 70–51	Cardinal Newman (Santa Rosa) def. Menlo School 51–32	Eastside College Prep def. St. Joseph Notre Dame 65–59	St. Bernard's (Eureka) def. Loyalton 68–51
2017	Archbishop Mitty def. Cardinal Newman (Santa Rosa) 78–54	McClatchy def. Oak Ridge (El Dorado Hills) 46–34	Vanden (Fairfield) def. Miramonte (Orinda) 66–65	Campolindo (Moraga) def. St. Mary's (Berkeley) 78–56	West Campus def. St. Joseph Notre Dame 70–30	Eastside College Prep def. Woodside Priory 66–58	Fall River def. Loyalton 60–59
2018	Pinewood def. Archbishop Mitty 78–67 3OT	Sacred Heart Cathedral def. Miramonte (Orinda) 69–48	Pleasant Valley (Chico) def. Valley Christian (San Jose) 47–40	West Campus def. Clovis 59–54	Woodside Priory def. Bradshaw Christian 59–58	Lowell def. Durham 48–31	Fall River def. Redding Christian 50–49
2019	Pinewood def. Salesian (Richmond) 64–49	Bishop O'Dowd (Oakland) def. Bear Creek 68–59	Menlo School def. Enterprise 53–38	Oakland def. Union Mine 49–38	Oakland Tech def. Menlo-Atherton 59–46	Caruthers def. St. Bernard's (Eureka) 52–44	Etna def. Forest Lake Christian 72–51
2020	Archbishop Mitty def. St. Joseph Notre Dame 69–53	Bishop O'Dowd (Oakland) def. Salesian (Richmond) 62–60	Oakland Tech def. Clovis 57–41	St. Mary's (Berkeley) def. Woodside Priory 68–59	Sierra Pacific def. Colfax 52–39	Branson (Ross) def. West Valley (Cottonwood) 57–48	Forest Lake Christian vs. Laytonville
2021	Not awarded						
2022	Archbishop Mitty def. Carondelet (Concord) 72–63	Salesian (Richmond) def. St. Ignatius (San Francisco) 52–48	San Joaquin Memorial (Fresno) def. Antelope 50–38	Oakland Tech def. Lincoln 51–46	Branson (Ross) def. Argonaut 51–45	San Domenico def. University (San Francisco) 54–48	Fall River def. Weed 67–65
2023	Archbishop Mitty def. Salesian (Richmond) 86–49	Oakland Tech def. St. Mary's (Stockton) 82–71	Central (Fresno) def. Pleasant Valley (Chico) 62–51	Colfax def. Caruthers 53–52	San Domenico def. Menlo School 42–39	Bret Harte def. Fall River 58–47	Cornerstone Christian (Antioch) def. Weed 58–45
2024	Archbishop Mitty def. Clovis West 71–34	Bishop O'Dowd (Oakland) def. Carondelet (Concord) 48–47	Colfax def. Pleasant Valley (Chico) 52–48	Caruthers def. University (San Francisco) 58–55	St. Bernard's (Eureka) def. Arcata 60–54	Oakland def. Crystal Springs Uplands 62–50	Weed def. Fall River 72–55
2025	Archbishop Mitty def. Clovis West 64–60	Carondelet (Concord) def. St. Mary's (Stockton) 56–51	Caruthers def. Salesian (Richmond) 77–63	Marin Catholic def. Justin-Siena (Napa) 65–54	Half Moon Bay def. Lowell 49–47	Woodland Christian def. Encinal (Alameda) 54–45	Faith Christian (Yuba City) def. Cornerstone Christian (Antioch) 58–53
2026	Archbishop Mitty def. Clovis West 71-42	Clovis def. Central (Fresno) 76-59	Sierra Pacific def. Oakland Tech 66-62	Valley Christian (San Jose) def. Menlo-Atherton 40-36	Faith Christian (Yuba City) def. Lathrop 61-46	Woodland Christian def. Modoc (Alturas) 49-36	Cornerstone Christian (Antioch) def. Faith Christian (Yuba City) 48-27

== Southern California champions ==
=== Boys ===
Year	Open Division	Division I	Division II	Division III	Division IV	Division V
1982	Not awarded	Carson (Los Angeles) def. Banning (Los Angeles) 88–79	Banning def. Burroughs 70–55	Not awarded	Not awarded	
1983	Not awarded	Crenshaw (Los Angeles) def. Long Beach Poly 62–53	Santa Clara (Oxnard) def. Sonora 60–53	Crossroads def. Chadwick (Palos Verdes) 70–51	Not awarded	
1984	Not awarded	Long Beach Poly def. Crenshaw (Los Angeles) 58–54	Oceanside def. Workman (Covina) 68–54	Pasadena Poly (Note: Listed in 1984–1986 is the SoCal selection for Division III.)	Not awarded	
1985	Not awarded	Crenshaw (Los Angeles) def. Edison (Fresno) 100–62	Washington Union (Fresno) def. Oceanside 50–32	Avenal	Not awarded	
1986	Not awarded	Crenshaw (Los Angeles) def. Mater Dei (Santa Ana) 59–57	Wilson (Hacienda Heights) def. El Camino (Oceanside) 64–46	Crossroads	Not awarded	
1987	Not awarded	Mater Dei (Santa Ana) def. Fairfax (Los Angeles) 46–42	Woodbridge (Irvine) def. Saugus 65–53	Crossroads def. Whitney (Cerritos) 74–46	Not awarded	
1988	Not awarded	Manual Arts (Los Angeles) def. Crenshaw (Los Angeles) 89–82	Foothill (Bakersfield) def. Madison (San Diego) 62–60	Lincoln (San Diego) def. Lemoore 80–68	Washington Union (Fresno) def. Garces Memorial (Bakersfield) 69–62	Calipatria def. The Bishop's School 56–47
1989	Not awarded	Crenshaw (Los Angeles) def. Manual Arts (Los Angeles) 84–82	Glendora def. Dominguez (Compton) 61–57	Trabuco Hills def. Morningside (Inglewood) 60–57	Santa Clara (Oxnard) def. Washington Union (Fresno) 78–55	Bel-Air Prep def. Immanuel (Reedley) 50–49
1990	Not awarded	Mater Dei (Santa Ana) def. Long Beach Poly 46–45	Artesia def. Glendora 57–44	Servite (Anaheim) def. Dos Pueblos (Goleta) 46–29	Santa Clara (Oxnard) def. St. Joseph 91–65	Christian (El Cajon) def. Faith Baptist (Canoga Park) 80–72
1991	Not awarded	Fremont (Los Angeles) def. Santa Barbara 78–59	Tustin def. Artesia 51–36	Estancia (Costa Mesa) def. Pomona 64–40	Santa Clara (Oxnard) def. Lincoln (San Diego) 68–55	Ribet Academy def. Rio Hondo Prep 63–56 OT
1992	Not awarded	Mater Dei (Santa Ana) def. Capistrano Valley 54–44	Artesia def. Glendora 58–54	Morningside (Inglewood) def. Estancia (Costa Mesa) 84–67	Lincoln (San Diego) def. Santa Clara (Oxnard) 62–60	Faith Baptist (Canoga Park) def. Campbell Hall 63–60
1993	Not awarded	Crenshaw (Los Angeles) def. Mater Dei (Santa Ana) 63–61	Artesia def. East Bakersfield 68–54	Morningside (Inglewood) def. South Torrance 91–82	Serra (Gardena) def. Lincoln (San Diego) 69–67	Brethren Christian (Huntington Beach) def. Chadwick (Palos Verdes) 47–46
1994	Not awarded	Crenshaw (Los Angeles) def. Mater Dei (Santa Ana) 71–67	East Bakersfield def. Inglewood 80–65	Pacifica (Garden Grove) def. University (San Diego) 60–55	Lincoln (San Diego) def. Verbum Dei (Los Angeles) 94–93	Pacific Hills def. Immanuel (Reedley) 74–51
1995	Not awarded	Mater Dei (Santa Ana) def. Clovis West 71–51	Dominguez (Compton) def. J.W. North (Riverside) 69–45	Artesia def. Harvard-Westlake 55–54	Verbum Dei (Los Angeles) def. Lincoln (San Diego) 94–70	Montclair Prep (Van Nuys) def. Horizon (San Diego) 59–58
1996	Not awarded	Crenshaw (Los Angeles) def. Mater Dei (Santa Ana) 78–67	Dominguez (Compton) def. Inglewood 67–57	Harvard-Westlake def. University (San Diego) 58–47 OT	Washington Union (Fresno) def. Crossroads 75–54	Montclair Prep (Van Nuys) def. Horizon (San Diego) 67–62
1997	Not awarded	Crenshaw (Los Angeles) def. Mater Dei (Santa Ana) 71–66	Dominguez (Compton) def. El Camino (Oceanside) 78–63	Harvard-Westlake def. University (San Diego) 47–40	Crossroads def. Calvary Chapel (Santa Ana) 57–45	Horizon (San Diego) def. Pasadena Poly 70–49
1998	Not awarded	Westchester def. Artesia 61–60	Santa Margarita Catholic def. Compton 60–50	University (San Diego) def. Washington Union (Fresno) 58–54	Verbum Dei (Los Angeles) def. The Bishop's School 67–46	Pacific Hills def. Horizon (San Diego) 81–79 3OT
1999	Not awarded	Mater Dei (Santa Ana) def. Artesia 68–55	Dominguez (Compton) def. Edison (Fresno) 85–57	Washington Union (Fresno) def. San Dimas 67–45	Verbum Dei (Los Angeles) def. Horizon (San Diego) 68–62	Santa Clara (Oxnard) def. Christian (El Cajon) 93–55
2000	Not awarded	Narbonne (Harbor City) def. Mater Dei (Santa Ana) 71–64 (Championship vacated)	Dominguez (Compton) def. Foothill (Bakersfield) 75–50	Bishop Montgomery (Torrance) def. Morningside (Inglewood) 72–59	St. Bernard def. Crossroads 61–42	Price (Los Angeles) def. Christian (El Cajon) 72–69
2001	Not awarded	Mater Dei (Santa Ana) def. Clovis West 80–62	Dominguez (Compton) def. Redondo Union 62–57	Bishop Montgomery (Torrance) 88–68	Crossroads def. Garces Memorial (Bakersfield) 66–52	Price (Los Angeles) def. Immanuel (Reedley) 69–59
2002	Not awarded	Westchester def. Long Beach Poly 66–60	Martin Luther King (Riverside) def. Mater Dei (Santa Ana) 70–65	Centennial (Compton) def. Bishop Montgomery (Torrance) 57–56	Horizon (San Diego) def. Garces Memorial (Bakersfield) 68–65	Price (Los Angeles) def. Immanuel (Reedley) 73–61
2003	Not awarded	Westchester def. Fairfax (Los Angeles) 43–41	Mater Dei (Santa Ana) def. Inglewood 88–54	Harvard-Westlake def. Artesia 80–62	Horizon (San Diego) def. Garces Memorial (Bakersfield) 59–56	Price (Los Angeles) def. Immanuel (Reedley) 61–41
2004	Not awarded	Fairfax (Los Angeles) def. 75–68 OT	Dominguez (Compton) def. Sunny Hills (Fullerton) 58–37	Centennial (Compton) def. Santa Margarita Catholic 59–51	Verbum Dei (Los Angeles) def. St. Joseph 56–55	Price (Los Angeles) def. Mission Prep (San Luis Obispo) 71–61
2005	Not awarded	Westchester def. Fairfax (Los Angeles) 54–53	Mater Dei (Santa Ana) def. Dominguez (Compton) 68–61	St. Augustine (San Diego) def. Artesia 74–48	Campbell Hall def. San Joaquin Memorial (Fresno) 65–42	Price (Los Angeles) def. Mission Prep (San Luis Obispo) 65–58
2006	Not awarded	Clovis West def. Los Alamitos 55–42	Mater Dei (Santa Ana) def. Villa Park 84–67	Artesia def. Harvard-Westlake 73–55	Horizon (San Diego) def. San Joaquin Memorial (Fresno) 68–67 2OT	Santa Fe Christian (Solana Beach) def. Mission Prep (San Luis Obispo) 52–39
2007	Not awarded	Fairfax (Los Angeles) def. Westchester 77–44	Mater Dei (Santa Ana) def. Redondo Union 70–62	Artesia def. La Cañada 79–54	Campbell Hall def. Horizon (San Diego) 62–59	View Park Prep (Los Angeles) def. Price (Los Angeles) 60–56
2008	Not awarded	Dominguez (Compton) def. Martin Luther King (Riverside) 83–74	Mater Dei (Santa Ana) def. Edison (Fresno) 75–59	Santa Margarita Catholic def. Bishop Montgomery (Torrance) 67–39	Campbell Hall def. San Joaquin Memorial (Fresno) 76–45	Renaissance Academy (La Cañada) def. Price (Los Angeles) 55–52
2009	Not awarded	Westchester def. Martin Luther King (Riverside) 56–39	Eisenhower (Rialto) def. Loyola (Los Angeles) 68–62	Ocean View (Huntington Beach) def. Harvard-Westlake 79–63	Price (Los Angeles) def. Bishop Montgomery (Torrance) 85–82 2OT	Windward def. Pacific Hills 52–40
2010	Not awarded	Westchester def. Mater Dei (Santa Ana) 71–68	Lincoln (San Diego) def. Compton 60–52	Serra (Gardena) def. Centennial (Compton) 74–50	Price def. Francis Parker 69–48	Lutheran (La Verne) def. Windward 52–50
2011	Not awarded	Mater Dei (Santa Ana) def. Centennial (Corona) 76–64	Summit (Fontana) def. Lincoln (San Diego) 74–69	Lutheran (La Verne) def. La Cañada 57–47	Windward def. Oaks Christian 58–52	St. Bernard def. Sierra Canyon 61–59
2012	Not awarded	Mater Dei (Santa Ana) def. Bullard 85–66	La Costa Canyon def. Lincoln (San Diego) 47–43	Bishop Alemany (Mission Hills) def. St. John Bosco 62–61	Price def. Serra (Gardena) 73–66	Village Christian def. Renaissance Academy (La Cañada) 58–57
2013	Mater Dei (Santa Ana) def. Etiwanda 60–37	Santa Monica def. Loyola 53–30	Redondo Union def. J.W. North (Riverside) 60–48	St. Augustine (San Diego) def. Chaminade 61–57	Pacific Hills def. Bishop Montgomery (Torrance) 73–69	Horizon Christian def. San Gabriel Academy 54–36
2014	Mater Dei (Santa Ana) def. Westchester 59–54	Centennial (Corona) def. Chino Hills 80–73	St. John Bosco def. Compton 72–55	Chaminade def. Santa Margarita 53–52	Bishop Montgomery (Torrance) def. Cantwell-Sacred Heart 66–56	Renaissance Academy (La Cañada) def. View Park 58–55
2015	Mater Dei (Santa Ana) def. Fairfax 51–40	Chino Hills def. Centennial (Corona) 62–50	La Mirada def. Lawndale 49–40	Damien def. Cathedral 68–62	Crespi def. Campbell Hall 58–54	Sierra Canyon def. Price 70–44
2016	Chino Hills def. Bishop Montgomery (Torrance) 84–62	Crespi def. Redondo Union 66–63 OT	Long Beach Poly def. J.W. North (Riverside) 61–54	Ayala (Chino Hills) def. Bonita 63–54	Harvard-Westlake def. Viewpoint 52–39	St. Bernard def. Rancho Christian 67–61
2017	Bishop Montgomery (Torrance) def. Mater Dei (Santa Ana) 60–53	Roosevelt (Eastvale) def. Centennial (Corona) 68–65	Esperanza def. Pasadena 68–58	Villa Park def. Colony (Ontario) 78–67	Helix def. Immanuel 80–69	Rolling Hills Prep def. Notre Dame (Riverside) 60–59
2018	Sierra Canyon def. Etiwanda 58–55	Chino Hills def. St. John Bosco 67–51	Crossroads def. Birmingham (Los Angeles) 54–50	Notre Dame (Riverside) def. Bishop Amat 69–56	View Park def. Christian (El Cajon) 57–43	Santa Clarita Christian def. Van Nuys 81–73
2019	Sierra Canyon def. Mater Dei (Santa Ana) 83–73	Chino Hills def. Etiwanda 49–47	Colony (Ontario) def. Rancho Cucamonga 77–75	La Jolla Country Day def. Crescenta Valley 71–43	Ribet Academy def. Silverado (Victorville) 84–64	Foothill (Bakersfield) def. Southwest SD 69–55
2020	Sierra Canyon def. Etiwanda 63–61	Ribet Academy def. Renaissance Academy (La Cañada) 45–31	St. Francis (La Canada) def. Roosevelt (Eastvale) 53–44	Arroyo Grande def. Providence (Burbank) 79–69	Bakersfield Christian def. Palisades 57–43	Eastside def. Roosevelt (Los Angeles) 53–48

Year	Open Division	Division 1-AA	Division 1-A	Division 2-AA	Division 2-A	Division 3-AA	Division 3-A	Division 4-AA	Division 4-A	Division 5-AA	Division 5-A	Division 6-AA
2021 (Note: Due to the COVID-19 pandemic, only SoCal Championships were conducted and were conducted in 12 divisions each for boys and girls.)	Etiwanda def. Torrey Pines 68–65	St. John Bosco def. Ribet Academy 70–68	Santa Fe Christian (Solana Beach) def. Capistrano Valley (Mission Viejo) 65–38	Santa Margarita def. Crean Lutheran (Irvine) 66–53	Mater Dei Catholic (Chula Vista) def. Central (Fresno) 67–50	Aquinas (San Bernardino) def. La Costa Canyon 57–41	Bonita Vista def. Shalhevet (Los Angeles) 77–71	San Ysidro def. Linfield Christian (Temecula) 73–71	Coronado def. Orange Glen (Escondido) 60–57 (Championship vacated)	Sage Creek (Carlsbad) def. Roosevelt (Fresno) 73–54	Kingsburg def. Washington Union (Fresno) 62–59	Fowler def. Maranatha Christian 50–48

Year	Open Division	Division I	Division II	Division III	Division IV	Division V
2022	Centennial (Corona) def. Sierra Canyon 83–59	Damien def. Crean Lutheran 58–53	Foothill (Santa Ana) def. Los Altos (Hacienda Heights) 46–41	Venice (Los Angeles) def. Viewpoint (Calabasas) 62–55	Scripps Ranch def. Valley Torah 68–54	Chaffey (Ontario) def. La Quinta (Westminster) 63–53
2023	Harvard-Westlake def. Centennial (Corona) 80–61	Notre Dame (Sherman Oaks) def. Sierra Canyon 80–61	Pacifica Christian (Newport Beach) def. Orange Lutheran 52–51	Buena (Ventura) def. Culver City 82–79	Valencia def. St. Bonaventure (Ventura) 72–58	Lynwood def. Pacifica Christian (Santa Monica) 87–65
2024	Harvard-Westlake def. Roosevelt (Eastvale) 63–59	St. John Bosco def. Mater Dei (Santa Ana) 71–68	Centennial (Bakersfield) def. Heritage Christian (Northridge) 68–56	Alemany (Mission Hills) def. Bosco Tech (Rosemead) 74–63	Chatsworth def. Cleveland (Reseda) 62–47	Verdugo Hills def. North (Bakersfield) 56–53
2025	Roosevelt (Eastvale) def. Notre Dame (Sherman Oaks) 79–76	Sierra Canyon def. Redondo Union 74–68	Chatsworth def. Bakersfield Christian 66–51	San Gabriel Academy def. Maranatha (Pasadena) 58–49	Fresno Christian def. Granada Hills Charter 50–49	Diamond Ranch (Pomona) def. Math and Science College Preparatory (Los Angeles) 65–59
2026	Sierra Canyon def. Harvard-Westlake 63-57	Damien def. St. John Bosco 48-41	Bakersfield Christian def. Palisades 59-57	Birmingham (Los Angeles) def. Colony (Ontario) 73-58	San Juan Hills (San Juan Capistrano) def. Tulare Union 74-66	Sylmar def. Coalinga 66-58

=== Girls ===
Year	Open Division	Division I	Division II	Division III	Division IV	Division V
1982	Not awarded	Riverside Poly def. Gahr (Cerritos) 48–39	Mission Viejo def. San Joaquin Memorial (Fresno) 63–46	Not awarded	Not awarded	
1983	Not awarded	Buena (Ventura) def. Morningside (Inglewood) 44–26	La Reina (Thousand Oaks) def. Point Loma 51–42	Marshall Fundamental (Pasadena) def. McFarland 38–32	Not awarded	
1984	Not awarded	Buena (Ventura) def. Locke (Los Angeles) 52–47	Point Loma def. Indio 57–36	Woodlake def. Maricopa 49–48	Not awarded	
1985	Not awarded	Point Loma def. Delano 59–49	El Camino (Oceanside) def. Washington Union (Fresno) 64–58	Woodlake def. La Jolla Country Day 62–40	Not awarded	
1986	Not awarded	Point Loma def. Lynwood 53–50	Chino def. Santa Clara (Oxnard) 49–44	Woodlake def. Yucca Valley 52–31	Not awarded	
1987	Not awarded	Point Loma def. Edison (Huntington Beach) 56–45	Valley Christian (Cerritos) def. Lompoc 67–38	Woodlake def. Avenal 43–36	Not awarded	
1988	Not awarded	Morningside (Inglewood) def. Lynwood 52–44	Palos Verdes def. San Pasqual 44–37	Lemoore def. Ramona 50–35	Chowchilla def. Santa Clara (Oxnard) 47–37	Avenal def. Trona 36–23
1989	Not awarded	Morningside (Inglewood) def. Point Loma 45–44	Katella (Anaheim) def. Vista 56–50	Brea Olinda def. Lemoore 71–39	Wasco def. Santa Clara (Oxnard) 40–38	Mission Prep (San Luis Obispo) def. Avenal 52–48
1990	Not awarded	Morningside (Inglewood) def. Washington (Los Angeles) 61–45	John Muir (Pasadena) def. Point Loma 43–38	Brea Olinda def. Palos Verdes 47–46	St. Joseph (Santa Maria) def. Sierra Tollhouse 60–43	Rosamond def. Strathmore 51–48
1991	Not awarded	Morningside (Inglewood) def. Clovis West 52–40	Brea Olinda def. Ventura 58–51	Palos Verdes def. Lompoc 63–43	St. Joseph (Santa Maria) def. Morro Bay 62–36	Christian (El Cajon) def. Mission Prep (San Luis Obispo) 62–51
1992	Not awarded	Peninsula (Rolling Hills) def. Lynwood 60–50	Bishop Montgomery (Torrance) def. Bishop Alemany (Mission Hills) 45–44	Brea Olinda def. Rancho Alamitos (Garden Grove) 70–51	Santa Ynez def. Morro Bay 54–36	Christian (El Cajon) def. Rio Hondo Prep 57–49
1993	Not awarded	Lynwood def. Buena (Ventura) 44–33	Brea Olinda def. University City (San Diego) 45–39	Costa Mesa def. Morningside (Inglewood) 49–46	St. Bernard def. Valley Christian (Cerritos) 51–22	Christian (El Cajon) def. Mission Prep (San Luis Obispo) 48–46
1994	Not awarded	Lynwood def. Clovis West 62–51	Woodbridge (Irvine) def. Bishop Alemany (Mission Hills) 46–41	Brea Olinda def. Newport Harbor 67–39	St. Bernard def. Santa Ynez 54–41	Christian (El Cajon) def. The Bishop's School 53–48
1995	Not awarded	Mater Dei (Santa Ana) def. Clovis West 50–47	Woodbridge (Irvine) def. Brea Olinda 53–49	Newbury Park def. Santana (Santee) 67–57	Valley Christian (Cerritos) def. Santa Ynez 86–76	Christian (El Cajon) def. Julian 52–46
1996	Not awarded	Mater Dei (Santa Ana) def. Buena (Ventura) 48–40	Woodbridge (Irvine) def. Brea Olinda 53–45	Bishop Montgomery (Torrance) def. Morningside (Inglewood) 51–30	Valley Christian (Cerritos) def. Santa Ynez 69–65	Mission Prep (San Luis Obispo) def. Julian 66–48
1997	Not awarded	Crenshaw (Los Angeles) def. Narbonne (Harbor City) 50–30	Laguna Hills def. Brea Olinda 40–29	Bishop Montgomery (Torrance) def. Eastlake (Chula Vista) 74–42	St. Bernard def. Bellarmine-Jefferson (Burbank) 58–43	Christian (El Cajon) def. Mission Prep (San Luis Obispo) 73–55
1998	Not awarded	Narbonne (Harbor City) def. Peninsula (Rolling Hills) (Championship vacated)	Brea Olinda def. Edison (Fresno) 64–52	Alemany (Mission Hills) def. Harvard-Westlake 50–45	St. Bernard def. Corcoran 72–52	Mission Prep (San Luis Obispo) def. Chadwick (Palos Verdes) 50–47
1999	Not awarded	Palisades (Pacific Palisades) def. Peninsula (Rolling Hills) 53–41	Brea Olinda def. Edison (Fresno) 69–65	Harvard-Westlake def. Rosary Academy 72–50	Calvary Chapel (Santa Ana) def. The Bishop's School 46–43	Chadwick (Palos Verdes) def. Mission Prep (San Luis Obispo) 60–49
2000	Not awarded	Narbonne (Harbor City) def. Hanford 69–40	Brea Olinda def. Redondo Union 52–44	Bishop Montgomery (Torrance) def. Kearny (San Diego) 88–72	St. Bernard def. The Bishop's School 67–46	Santa Fe Christian (Solana Beach) def. Pilgrim (Los Angeles) 57–41
2001	Not awarded	Narbonne (Harbor City) def. Lynwood 67–41	Hanford def. Artesia 62–59	Bishop Montgomery (Torrance) def. Rosary Academy 60–51	The Bishop's School def. Oak Park 66–41	La Jolla Country Day def. Mission Prep (San Luis Obispo) 81–50
2002	Not awarded	Lynwood def. Narbonne (Harbor City) 52–33	Redondo Union def. Troy (Fullerton) 53–39	Bishop Montgomery (Torrance) def. Artesia 61–57	St. Bernard def. The Bishop's School 56–46	La Jolla Country Day def. Pilgrim (Los Angeles) 63–37
2003	Not awarded	Lynwood def. Narbonne (Harbor City) 54–46	Troy (Fullerton) def. Mater Dei (Santa Ana) 51–39	Bishop Montgomery (Torrance) def. Mission Bay 60–41	La Jolla Country Day def. Marlborough (Los Angeles) 62–42	Mission Prep (San Luis Obispo) def. Central Valley Christian 56–19
2004	Not awarded	San Diego def. Long Beach Poly 71–61	Troy (Fullerton) def. Mater Dei (Santa Ana) 47–25	Bishop Amat def. Morningside (Inglewood) 71–51	La Jolla Country Day def. Marlborough (Los Angeles) 78–45	Mission Prep (San Luis Obispo) def. Central Valley Christian 54–22
2005	Not awarded	Canyon Springs (Moreno Valley) def. Ventura 57–41	Troy (Fullerton) def. Mt. Miguel (Spring Valley) 49–31	Bishop Amat def. Bishop Montgomery (Torrance) 44–37	Brentwood (Los Angeles) def. La Jolla Country Day 51–34	Pacific Hills def. Rolling Hills Prep 54–36
2006	Not awarded	Long Beach Poly def. Lynwood 63–44	Troy (Fullerton) def. Villa Park 34–28	Bishop Amat def. Yosemite 50–39	Windward def. La Jolla Country Day 48–35	Pacific Hills def. Mission Prep (San Luis Obispo) 62–50
2007	Not awarded	Long Beach Poly def. A. B. Miller, Fontana 67–54	Brea Olinda def. Norco 66–59	Bishop Amat def. Santa Margarita Catholic 54–43	Marlborough (Los Angeles) def. La Jolla Country Day 69–62	Pacific Hills def. Mission Prep (San Luis Obispo) 55–42
2008	Not awarded	Long Beach Poly def. Narbonne (Harbor City) 60–47 OT	Mira Costa (Manhattan Beach) def. Ayala (Chino Hills) 72–64 3OT	Magnolia (Anaheim) def. John Muir (Pasadena) 40–39	La Jolla Country Day def. Marlborough (Los Angeles) 69–53	Mission Prep (San Luis Obispo) def. Calvin Christian (Escondido) 52–25
2009	Not awarded	Long Beach Poly def. Colony (Ontario) 67–54	Brea Olinda def. Mater Dei (Santa Ana) 44–38	Inglewood def. Marlborough (Los Angeles) 74–57	Mater Dei Catholic def. The Bishop's School 54–51	Bellarmine-Jefferson (Burbank) def. View Park Prep (Los Angeles) 61–49
2010	Not awarded	Long Beach Poly def. Clovis West 68–53	Mater Dei (Santa Ana) def. Brea Olinda 51–46	Bishop Amat def. Inglewood 56–54	Harvard-Westlake def. Bishop Montgomery (Torrance) 57–44	St. Anthony def. Montclair Prep (Van Nuys) 48–41
2011	Not awarded	Mater Dei (Santa Ana) def. Canyon Springs (Moreno Valley) 59–44	Rialto def. Buena 44–42	St. Joseph def. Serra (Gardena) 54–45	Windward def. La Jolla Country 68–58	St. Bernard def. Santa Clara (Oxnard) 60–45
2012	Not awarded	Mater Dei (Santa Ana) def. Long Beach Poly 54–43	J.W. North (Riverside) def. Foothill 57–49	Laguna Hills def. Mission Bay 75–69	La Jolla Country def. Serra (Gardena) 46–36	Mission Prep (San Luis Obispo) def. Rolling Hills Prep 62–41
2013	Windward def. Mater Dei (Santa Ana) 81–71	Long Beach Poly def. Canyon Springs (Moreno Valley) 63–40	Lynwood def. Ridgeview 60–42	Bishop Alemany (Mission Hills) def. Chaminade 60–47	Serra (Gardena) def. St. Bernard 63–54	Sierra Canyon def. Horizon Christian 63–62
2014	Long Beach Poly def. Etiwanda 56–46	Canyon Springs (Moreno Valley) def. Bishop Alemany (Mission Hills) 66–51	Chaminade def. West Torrance 67–50	Santa Barbara def. Santa Margarita 58–48	Sierra Canyon def. Serra (Gardena) 59–52	La Jolla Country def. Immanuel 54–33
2015	Mater Dei (Santa Ana) def. Chaminade 48–44	Serra (Gardena) def. Ventura 61–45	Mark Keppel def. Redondo Union 48–44	Brea Olinda def. El Dorado (Placentia) 50–46	Sierra Canyon def. Oaks Christian 49–37	La Jolla Country def. The Bishop's School 75–56
2016	Chaminade def. Long Beach Poly 50–49	Brea Olinda def. Vista Murrieta 64–55	Cajon def. Mater Dei (Santa Ana) 51–30	Lakeside def. Orange Lutheran 35–34	Antelope Valley def. La Cañada 66–51	Village Christian def. Mission Prep (San Luis Obispo) 58–33
2017	Clovis West def. Long Beach Poly 53–44	Windward def. Ventura 61–43	Mater Dei (Santa Ana) def. Orangewood Academy 50–39	Rosary Academy def. Serra (Gardena) 63–43	Los Osos def. Village Christian 52–43	Rolling Hills Prep def. Bellarmine-Jefferson (Burbank) 68–56
2018	Windward def. Clovis West 61–50	Serra (Gardena) def. Ribet Academy 58–46	Redondo Union def. San Marcos 56–43	Sunny Hills def. Mater Dei Catholic (Chula Vista) 53–50	Rolling Hills Prep def. Knight 55–47	Sierra Pacific def. Hueneme 71–70
2019	Sierra Canyon def. Clovis West 74–70	Rosary Academy def. La Jolla Country Day 62–53	Rolling Hills Prep def. Mark Keppel 54–53 OT	McFarland def. Palisades 68–66	Northview def. Oak Park 44–37	Ramona (Riverside) def. Anaheim 61–43
2020	La Jolla Country Day def. Windward 59–48	Rosary Academy def. Cathedral Catholic 55–48	Palisades def. Santa Monica 51–36	Paloma Valley def. Peninsula 60–48	Lancaster def. Ontario Christian 46–36	East Bakersfield def. Madison (San Diego) 56–42

Year	Open Division	Division 1-AA	Division 1-A	Division 2-AA	Division 2-A	Division 3-AA	Division 3-A	Division 4-AA	Division 4-A	Division 5-AA	Division 5-A	Division 6-AA
2021	Centennial (Corona) def. Mater Dei (Santa Ana) 65–51	Lynwood def. Etiwanda 58–47	Long Beach Poly def. Rosary Academy 58–28	Mater Dei Catholic (Chula Vista) def. Bishop Alemany (Mission Hills) 56–42	Westlake def. El Camino (Oceanside) 50–47	Rancho Bernardo def. Mary Star of the Sea (San Pedro) 72–44	Buchanan (Clovis) def. Del Norte (San Diego) 78–62	Roosevelt (Fresno) def. South Pasadena 48–34	Bakersfield Christian def. Academy of Our Lady of Peace 60–45	Strathmore def. Fallbrook 63–54	Trinity Classical Academy (Valencia) def. San Fernando 49–33	Corcoran def. Victory Christian Academy 61–57

Year	Open Division	Division I	Division II	Division III	Division IV	Division V
2022	Sierra Canyon def. Etiwanda 60–51	Windward def. Orangewood Academy 61–58	Sage Hill (Newport Coast) def. Santiago (Corona) 43–41	La Salle (Pasadena) def. Porterville 62–49	Imperial def. Yucca Valley 52–46	Shalhevet (Los Angeles) def. Victory Christian Academy 62–52
2023	Etiwanda def. Sierra Canyon 55–54	Santiago (Corona) def. Del Norte (San Diego) 52–39	Bonita Vista def. Leuzinger (Lawndale) 80–67	Los Osos def. Redondo Union 60–39	Shalhevet (Los Angeles) def. Campbell Hall 57–45	Marina (Huntington Beach) def. San Pedro 51–43
2024	Etiwanda def. Sierra Canyon 54–51	Bishop Montgomery (Torrance) def. Brentwood (Los Angeles) 71–68	Harvard-Westlake def. Notre Dame (Sherman Oaks) 50–38	Granada Hills Charter def. Bakersfield Christian 58–56	Grossmont (El Cajon) def. Fallbrook 57–52	Montgomery (San Diego) def. Escondido Charter 55–51
2025	Etiwanda def. Ontario Christian 67–62	Sage Hill (Newport Coast) def. Windward 52–41	Rancho Bernardo def. Monache (Porterville) 35–25	Mater Dei Catholic def. El Camino Real 51–38	Whitney (Cerritos) def. Cantwell-Sacred Heart of Mary (Montebello) 47–42	Rosamond def. Hillcrest (Riverside) 68–41
2026	Ontario Christian def. Sage Hill (Newport Coast) 73-51	Centennial (Corona) def. Rancho Christian 81-61	St. Joseph (Santa Maria) def. Saugus 60-55	El Dorado (Placentia) def. Leuzinger (Lawndale) 61-56	Palisades def. Godinez Fundamental (Santa Ana) 54-38	Laguna Hills def. Schurr (Montebello) 43-24
