= MSCP =

MSCP may be an abbreviation for:

- Mass Storage Control Protocol, a software protocol developed by Digital Equipment Corporation
- Math and Science College Preparatory, a secondary school in Los Angeles, California, USA
- Mean Spherical Candle Power, a unit of measure that represents the average output of a light source measured in all directions (360°)
- Melbourne School of Continental Philosophy, an independent school based at the University of Melbourne, Australia
- Multi-storey car park, a chiefly British abbreviation for an automobile parking structure
- Manipur State Congress Party, a former political party in the Indian state of Manipur
