= Modoc High School =

Modoc High School may refer to:

- Modoc High School (Alturas, California)
- Union High School (Modoc), Indiana
