= Julian High School =

Julian High School may refer to:

- Julian High School (Chicago), Chicago, Illinois
- Julian High School (California), Julian, California
