= Ribét Academy =

Location
- 2911 San Fernando Road; Los Angeles, California; United States; 34°06′46″N 118°14′34″W

Information
- Type: Private
- Established: 1982
- Status: Permanently closed
- NCES School ID: BB910284
- Headmaster: Ronald Dauzat
- Faculty: 31.3 (on FTE basis)
- Grades: PreK–12
- Enrollment: 323 (2009–10)
- Student to teacher ratio: 10.3:1
- Colors: Green & White
- Nickname: Fighting Frogs
- Website: ribetacademy.com

Ribét Academy College Preparatory was a private, co-educational school from preschool to 12th grade located in Los Angeles, California. The school was accredited by the Accrediting Commission for Schools, Western Association of Schools and Colleges. Ribét Academy's former location was built in 1923.

Following major financial difficulties regarding declining enrollment, the school's leadership made the decision to retire and lease their Glassell Park property to a new charter school, ISANA Octavia Academy, which has been operating in the area since 2010. Ribét Academy officially closed in October 2025.

== Sports ==
In 1991, the boys' varsity basketball team won the CIF State Boys Basketball Championship - Division V. In 2019, the boys' varsity basketball team won the CIF State Boys Basketball Championship - Division IV. The following year, in 2020, the boys' varsity basketball team once again reached the State Championship game, this time in Division I; however, the game was cancelled due to COVID-19.

In August 2021, the school's headmaster, Ronald R. Dauzat, confirmed that the boys' basketball program was shut down due to financial issues, stating, "We cannot support the program like we used to."

== History ==
The school was founded by French-born Jacques Ribét in 1982. It has occupied three other locations around Los Angeles.

== Notable alumni ==
- Tyler Dorsey, basketball player
- Adam G. Sevani, actor and dancer
- Mae Whitman, actress and singer

== See also ==
- Beijing Shuren Ribet Private School
