= St. Patrick-St. Vincent High School =

Private, coeducational school in Vallejo, California, USA

- Espiritu Santos

Location
- 1500 Benicia Road; Northern California; Vallejo, (Solano County), California 94591; USA; 38°5′12″N 122°12′7″W

Information
- Type: Private, Coeducational
- Motto: Facere et Docere ∙ Veritas (To do and To Teach ∙ Truth)
- Religious affiliation: Roman Catholic
- Patron saints: St. Patrick, St. Vincent
- Established: 1870 (St. Vincent); 1968 (St. Patrick)
- CEEB code: 053604
- Head of school: Clarence Isadore
- Grades: 9-12
  - Grade 9: 48
  - Grade 10: 70
  - Grade 11: 66
  - Grade 12: 70
- Average class size: ~25
- Campus size: 31 acres (130,000 m^{2})
- Colors: Dark Forest Green, Vegas Gold and White
- Slogan: “Faith to guide, Bruins with Pride!”
- Team name: Bruins
- Accreditation: Western Association of Schools and Colleges; Western Catholic Educational Association
- Tuition: $18,595 (2026-2027 School Year)
- Website: www.spsv.org

St. Patrick-St. Vincent High School is a private, Roman Catholic high school in Vallejo, in the U.S. state of California. It is located in the Roman Catholic Diocese of Sacramento.

== Background ==
St. Patrick-St. Vincent High School's long history began in 1870 when St. Vincent Ferrer parish established the Catholic Free School in Vallejo. The first graduates received diplomas in 1880. St. Vincent Ferrer, the "Saints," remained a co-educational high school serving students from the greater Solano County (Benicia, Fairfield, Napa, Vacaville, Vallejo) and West Contra Costa County until June 1968. In September 1968, at the urging of Msgr. Thomas Kirby, the Diocese of Sacramento opened St. Patrick High School, "St. Pat's," an all-boys school at the current location on Benicia Road. St. Vincent became an all-girls school.

During the succeeding years, the two high schools shared social events and occasionally shared faculty and instructional resources. Eventually, the schools had several co-ed athletic teams. In 1983, the changing demographics of Solano County and the rising cost of Catholic education necessitated some long range planning, and the decision was made to merge St. Patrick and St. Vincent High Schools. On October 18, 1986, the groundbreaking for a new classroom facility, to meet the expanding student body, took place, and in the fall of 1987, the first classes of St. Patrick-St. Vincent High School were united to continue the long and excellent tradition of Catholic secondary education in Solano County. The Dominican Sisters of San Rafael administered St. Vincent Ferrer High School under the auspices of the Diocese of Sacramento. The Congregation of Christian Brothers (formerly known as the Christian Brothers of Ireland) administered and staffed St. Patrick High School. After the merger, the Christian Brothers and the Dominican Sisters continued to serve in both administrative and teaching capacities. In 1993, when the Christian Brothers withdrew from St. Patrick-St. Vincent High School the Diocese of Sacramento assumed the responsibility for hiring the administrator of the school.

The traditions of both the Christian Brothers and the Dominican Sisters serve as a strong foundation upon which St. Patrick-St. Vincent High School can continue the mission of Catholic education well into the 21st century.

== Academics ==
Curriculum

St. Patrick-St. Vincent High School offers a rigorous, college preparatory education with an emphasis on math, science and the humanities. Classes meet all relevant Common Core standards. AP classes are offered in the areas of English (Literature and Composition, Language and Composition), Math (Statistics and Calculus), Computer Science, Art (Studio, 2-D and 3-D) World Language and Culture (Spanish and French) and History (World and US).

Requirements

To graduate from St. Patrick-St. Vincent High School, students must earn a total of 260 credits as outlined below. Juniors and seniors must carry a minimum of 60 credits per academic year. Freshmen and sophomores must take 70 credits each year. St. Patrick-St. Vincent High School is under no obligation to accept credits from other institutions. Make-up courses (night school and summer school) must be approved. The Assistant Principal makes all final decisions concerning the evaluation of credits.

The following courses are required of all students:

- Religious Studies - 40 credits
- English 40 - credits
- Mathematics - 30 credits
- Science - 20 credits
- Social Studies (must include World History, U.S. History, Civics, and Economics) - 30 credits
- World Language (required of honors/college-bound students; recommended for all others) - 20 credits
- Physical Education (including 5 credits of Health) - 20 credits
- Fine Arts - 10 credits
- Electives - 40 credits
- Christian Service Annual requirement

SPSV Honor Code

Every member of the St. Patrick-St. Vincent High School community strives to live by the letter and the spirit of the SPSV Honor Code:

"As a member of the St. Patrick-St. Vincent High School Community, I promise to aspire to the highest level of personal and academic integrity. I will work toward building an environment of trust and mutual respect in all that I do. Furthermore, I commit myself to truth (Veritas), avoiding dishonesty in both academic work and in personal encounters. I will always endeavor to create an atmosphere of peace and tolerance, with respect for others and their ideas."

== School crest ==
The St. Patrick-St. Vincent High School crest incorporates the shields of St. Patrick High School and St. Vincent Ferrer High School. In the upper left hand corner of the crest is the shield of the Christian Brothers. The star in the crest is a reminder that those who instruct many unto justice shall shine as stars for all eternity. The star is set upon a Celtic cross, the source of the inspiration of faith and the instrument of redemption.

In the lower right hand corner is the traditional Dominican shield. Having its origins in medieval times, the shield's "cross fleury" signifies fruitful victory, duty, and self-sacrifice. The alternating dark and light represent various qualities. The dark stands for silence, wisdom, and fortitude; the white for peace, purity, charity and sincerity.

The two mottos "Veritas" (Latin for "Truth" and the motto of the Dominican Order) and "Facere et Docere" (Latin for "To do and To Teach" and the motto of the Congregation of Christian Brothers) represent the essence of Catholic education: to lead young people to the knowledge of the truth, which is God, and to reflect the charity of Christ in the many processes of instruction.

== Notable alumni ==
- Tug McGraw, Former Professional baseball player and father to singer-actor Tim McGraw.
- Fulton Kuykendall, Former NFL football player
- Ed Rollins, Republican campaign consultant and advisor
- Bakari Hendrix, SPSV '94, Retired Professional Basketball Player
- Robbie Herndon, Professional Basketball Player
