= Maranatha Christian Schools =

Private Christian school in San Diego County, California

Location
- 9050 Maranatha Drive; Del Sur, California 92127; United States
- Coordinates: 33.02392°N 117.13670°W

Information
- Type: Private Christian
- Established: 1991
- Principal: Pete Plotnik (high school); Kelly Rodriguez (junior high); Mary Cook (elementary school)
- Grades: PreK-12
- Gender: Co-ed
- Colors: Carolina blue, navy blue, and white
- Mascot: Eagle
- Website: http://www.maranathachristianschools.org

Maranatha Christian School (MCS) is a PreK-12 private coeducational Christian school in San Diego County, California. The school consists of separate campuses for its preschool and K-12 programs, both located on the west side of the 4S Ranch & Rancho Bernardo community. However, the preschool campus is only located on the property of Maranatha Chapel.

== Locations ==
The school is located on a 17.5-acre campus just west of Rancho Bernardo's 4S Ranch and east of Rancho Santa Fe.

- Maranatha Christian Schools - 9050 Maranatha Drive San Diego, CA 92127
- Maranatha Chapel - 10752 Coastwood Road San Diego, CA 92127

The campus for MCS contains a gymnasium, a football field, soccer field, baseball field, softball field, a weight room, computer/scientific lab rooms, and a golf putting green. These new baseball, softball, and soccer fields were added in 2019. The football field was also redone at the same time. The putting green was finished in February 2024.

== Athletics ==
Maranatha Christian has the following sports:

- Fall sports: cross country, football, cheerleading, girls' golf and girls' volleyball.
- Winter sports: boys' basketball, cheerleading, girls' basketball, boys' soccer, and girls' soccer.
- Spring sports: baseball, boys' golf, softball, track and field and boys' volleyball.
- Maranatha also has a dance team called the Spirit Squad.

== CIF Championships ==
Sport	Title(s) won
Baseball	2017
Boys' basketball	2021, 2025
Boys’ soccer	2024
Girls' volleyball	2016-2019
Girls' basketball	2017, 2021, 2022

== Academics ==
Honors and AP classes

Maranatha Christian offers 6 Honors courses for high school:

- Honors English 9 and English 10
- Honors Engineering II
- Honors Algebra II
- Honors Spanish III
- Honors World History (Only for Grade 9)

They also offer 17 Advanced Placement [AP] courses such as:

- Sciences: Biology, Chemistry, Computer Science Principles, Physics I, and Physics II
- Math: Calculus AB, Calculus BC, Computer Science A, Statistics
- English: English Language and English Literature
- History: European History, U.S. History, U.S. Government
- Ect: Spanish Language, Photography and Studio Art 2D

AP is an open-enrollment program.
