= Colfax High School (Colfax, California) =

Public high school in Colfax, California, United States

Location
- 24995 Ben Taylor Rd. Colfax, California 95713; United States; 39.1076°N 120.9659°W

Information
- Type: Public high school
- Established: 1959
- School board: Placer Union High School District
- NCES District ID: 0630750
- Superintendent: Dave Horsey
- NCES School ID: 063075004781
- Principal: Chasity Raybuck-Bonilla
- Staff: 30.22 (FTE)
- Teaching staff: 41
- Grades: 9–12
- Enrollment: 628 (2023–2024)
- Average class size: 25–27
- Student to teacher ratio: 20.78
- Campus size: 40 acres (160,000 m^{2})
- Colors: Green and White
- Mascot: Falcon
- Rival: Bear River High School, Placer High School
- API average: 835
- Newspaper: Pulse Magazine
- Yearbook: The Evergreen
- CDS Code: 31668943131851
- Website: chs.puhsd.k12.ca.us

Colfax High School is a four-year public high school in Colfax, California in the United States. It is in the Placer Union High School District in Placer County. The school currently serves about 700 students living between Auburn, Grass Valley, and Alta/Dutch Flat. The school itself is located on 40 acres (16 ha) in the Bear River valley north of downtown Colfax and adjacent to Colfax Elementary School.

The student body self-identified as 85.3% white, the average classroom size is 25–27, and there are 3.6 students per computer. Students are also given Chromebooks as of 2014. Ninety-five percent of the teachers have a full credential and the average length of time they have been teaching is 19 years. The graduation rate is 100.0% as of the 2007–2008 academic year.

Colfax High's mascot is the falcon, and its school colors are green and white.

== Academics ==
Colfax High offers 10 AP classes in subjects including English, Calculus, Statistics, Physics, Microeconomics, U.S. Government, Environmental Science, and U.S. History. 36.2% of 2008 Colfax High graduates completed the UC/CSU high school course requirements.

== Clubs and activities ==
Colfax High School has many student clubs, including Model UN, Airsoft club, Chess club, Culinary, GSA, Garden club, Engineering and art, and many others. There are many school events such as Homecoming week, which has a different theme every year, the "Quad Crown tournament" in which students compete in several activities to get their class to the top. There are also several school dances held every year.

=== Media and fine arts ===
Colfax High School has a drama program that operates as Creators of Riveting Entertainment a backronym of C.O.R.E. The drama program uses Colfax High's 500 seat performing arts center finished in 2003, inaugurated with a performance of Shakespeare's The Comedy of Errors in 2004. In 2011, C.O.R.E. launched its first musical production, Guys and Dolls. The musical theater program continued into the next year with a production of How to Succeed in Business Without Really Trying. The school also has a chamber choir program, which has won the Gold award at the WorldStrides Heritage Music Festival for 19 consecutive seasons. Other student media includes a yearbook (The Evergreen), a magazine (The Pulse), and from 1981 to 2011 a yearly calendar produced by the art program. It has in the past had a film and media class (Thunderpaw Multimedia), as well as an apparel store (Greenline Inc.). The film and media class used to produce yearly video yearbooks and short films, a few of which won awards.

=== Other activities ===
In addition to artistic and media programs, Colfax hosts activities for students interested in community service, politics, athletics, technology, dance, and science. The school Service Club, or S-Club, works with the local Soroptimists to provide for the community. Colfax's JSA Club is a chapter of the Junior State of America, and in 2012 won the statewide JSA Chapter of the Year award.

== Athletics ==
Colfax High fields cross country, track, tennis, volleyball, baseball, soccer, softball, golf, swim, football, basketball, cheer, and wrestling teams in the Pioneer Valley League, as well as Nordic skiing, alpine skiing, and snowboarding teams in the CNISSF league. Colfax is a Division IV or III school depending on the sport. Colfax is part of the Sac-Joaquin Section for most sports (excluding Nordic skiing, alpine skiing, and snowboarding). Golf: Trevor Brewer and Will Biles made it to sections in 2015. JV and varsity cheer won 1st place at JAMZ championships in 2014.

- Golden Empire League 1954–2002
- Pioneer Valley League 2002–2010

=== Football ===
The Division IV Colfax High Falcons football rival is traditionally Bear River High School in Nevada County. In 2011–2012, Colfax went 11–1 and claimed the PVL title for the seventh time in nine years. Hunter Perez set school records that season for touchdowns (33) and total yards (2,003).

In 2009, Pat Rawlins set the school record for yards rushed in a single game with 279 rushing yards.

=== Skiing and snowboarding ===
The Colfax girls ski team won the 2012 California state championship for downhill skiing. Teagan Santin led the Colfax team and won the individual title for all-around downhill. CHS athlete Nelly Steinhoff was the state champion in girls snowboarding in the same year.

=== Basketball ===
From 2004–2011, the Colfax boys basketball team won four Sac Joaquin Section Championships. In 2013, the Falcons won the PVL championship for the fifth time in eight years. In 1983 and 1984 the Colfax girls won back-to-back California state Div. III championships going 52–4 over the span. In 1998, the Colfax girls again reached the state championship game but fell to St. Bernards of Playa Del Rey. The Colfax girls program has won 11 CIF section championships and three Nor Cal regional crowns. The Lady Falcons won the PVL girls basketball title for the second consecutive year in the 2011–2012 season. In 2013, they shared the PVL crown with Placer and Bear River.

=== Track and field ===
In 2008 an all-weather track was placed around the football field.
