= Pacific Hills School =

Location
- 8628 Holloway Drive; West Hollywood, CA; 34°5′25.1″N 118°22′48.8″W

Information
- Type: Independent school Co-educational
- Established: 1983
- Closed: 2018
- Faculty: 18
- Grades: 6-12
- Enrollment: 85
- Colors: White, Blue, Red
- Mascot: Bruins
- Information: (310) 276-3068
- Website: www.phschool.org

Pacific Hills School (previously named Bel Air Prep) was a co-educational independent school located in West Hollywood, California, serving the needs of a diverse student population in grades 6-12. The school had a diverse international student population with about 20% of the school's students hailing from eleven countries on six continents.

There were about 85 students enrolled at Pacific Hills School each year with an average class size of 13.

Pacific Hills offered 12 AP courses, and advanced programs in music, arts and sciences.

In 2018 the school closed permanently.

== Notable alumni ==
- Jason Bateman (Actor) – attended, but did not graduate
- Monica Lewinsky – graduated salutatorian
- Dasha Zhukova – Russian-American businesswoman
- Khloé Kardashian – attended, but did not graduate
