= Bear River High School =

Public high school in Grass Valley, California, United States

Bear River High School (California)

Location
- 11130 Magnolia Road; Grass Valley, California 95949; United States; 39.046°N 121.076°W

Information
- Type: Public High School
- Established: 1986
- Superintendent: Ralf Swenson
- Principal: Chris Roberts
- Staff: 44
- Teaching staff: 31.12 (FTE)
- Grades: 9-12
- Enrollment: 634 (2023–2024)
- Average class size: 26-32
- Student to teacher ratio: 20.37
- Colors: Cardinal and gray
- Mascot: Bruin
- API average: 818
- Yearbook: The Rapids
- CDS Code: 29-66357-2930048
- Website: https://bearriver.njuhsd.com/

Bear River High School is a public high school in the Nevada Joint Union High School District in Grass Valley, California, United States. It is located across the street from Lake of the Pines. It had approximately 300 graduates in the 2006–2007 school year, for a 98.5% graduation rate. 52.1% completed CSU/UC prep. 90.6% of the students self-identified as white.

The school's music program participates in competitions and school concerts, including the annual Fantasy of Stars, which features several of the school's musical groups. Its show group, Starlite, is a show choir that incorporates student musicians rather than prerecorded backing tracks. Bear River Music uses the motto, “Improving the lives of audience member and performer alike through musical excellence, professionalism, and pride.”

Colfax High School and Bear River annually have a football game as part of a school event.

== Notable alumni ==
- John Cardiel, professional skateboarder
- Tessa Earl (class of 2002), ballet dancer
- Adrian Molina, writer and co-director of Pixar's Coco and Elio
