= Ursuline High School (Santa Rosa, California) =

Ursuline High School UHS
- Ursuline College

Location
- 90 Ursuline Road; Santa Rosa, (Sonoma County), California 95403; United States; 38°29′39″N 122°44′30″W

Information
- Type: Private, All-Female
- Motto: Soli Deo Gloria (Glory only to God)
- Religious affiliation: Roman Catholic
- Established: 1880
- Closed: 2011
- CEEB code: 053335
- Principal: Julie Carver
- Grades: 9-12
- Colors: Blue and Gold
- Team name: Bears
- Accreditation: Western Association of Schools and Colleges
- Newspaper: NU Times
- Admissions Director: Lisa Ormond
- Athletic Director: Richard Herrmann
- Advancement Director: Margaux Hardy

Ursuline High School was a private, Roman Catholic, all-girls college-preparatory high school in Santa Rosa, California, in the Diocese of Santa Rosa. It was owned and operated by the Ursuline Sisters of the Roman Union from 1880 to 2011, and was a sister school to Cardinal Newman High School for boys.

== History ==
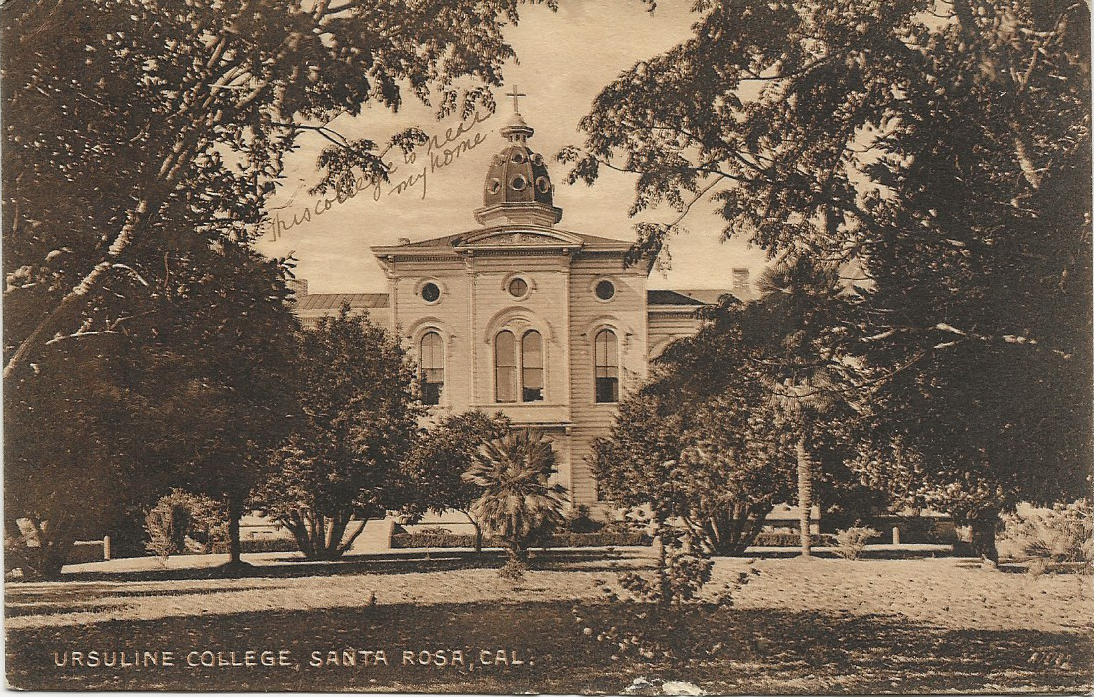
Postcard for the Ursuline College, Santa Rosa, California, ca. 1909.

Ursuline High School was established in 1880 at 10th and B Streets in downtown Santa Rosa by eight Ursuline sisters from Brown County, Ohio. At this time the school was called Ursuline College. A liberal arts college was chartered in 1901 by the sisters. Degrees continued to be offered until 1936.

In 1956 it moved to Ursuline Road on the former Howarth Estate. It was a boarding school until 1974.

From 1963 on, Ursuline was the sister school to Cardinal Newman High School for boys, located on the same street. The campuses shared a common eating area. The schools' academic programs were also intertwined, with most classes for juniors and seniors and some freshman and sophomore language classes taught co-educationally. The two schools also collaborated on school-sponsored social events such as the drama program. The schools had separate associated student bodies that collaborated in the discharge of their duties. Athletics, with the exceptions of cross country, track & field, swimming, and water polo, were not collaborations. The schools had separate offices, libraries, computer labs, classrooms, and gymnasiums, but in addition to the cafeteria they shared a multipurpose facility and some athletics facilities. Class rankings for Newman and Ursuline were separate, but the students graduated together, with at least one valedictorian and salutatorian from each school addressing their graduation class.

In 2008 68% of students were Catholic, the remainder of a variety of church and spiritual backgrounds. The school had three counselors and a director of college counseling to provide academic, spiritual, and social/emotional support to all students. LINK Crew students served as mentors, helping new students adjust to high school both socially and academically. 30% of students received some level of financial assistance. Enrollment was 400 in 2000, but fell to 281 in the 2010–2011 academic year.

In November 2010, Ursuline President Julie Carver sent out an email to all parents announcing that for financial reasons the school would close the following May. Cardinal Newman High School became coeducational in the following academic year, 2011–2012, and took on all continuing Ursuline students. The Ursuline campus became the site of Roseland Collegiate Prep, a charter high school, and was badly damaged in the Tubbs Fire in October 2017.

== Academics ==
Ursuline was a college-preparatory high school. In addition, the curriculum included community-based service learning, culminating in a senior project. Attendance at monthly liturgical services was required, as was four years of Religious Study courses. While the teachings of the Catholic Church were taught in each of the Religious Studies courses, in the Ursuline tradition and in the tradition of educational excellence, this teaching was done in an atmosphere of openness and respect for all beliefs and traditions.
