= Red Bluff High School =

Red Bluff Union High School

Location
- 1260 Union Street; Red Bluff, California, 96080; United States; 40.17689°N 122.25017°W

Information
- Type: Public School
- Principal: Rich Hassay
- Teaching staff: 80.14 (FTE)
- Grades: 9-12
- Enrollment: 1,584 (2023-2024)
- Student to teacher ratio: 19.77
- Campus: Rural
- Colors: Green and Gold
- Mascot: Spartans
- Newspaper: The Bluffer
- Website: rbhs.rbhsd.org

Red Bluff High School is a public school in Red Bluff, California. The institution offers courses from the ninth grade to the twelfth grade and is a member of the Red Bluff Joint Union High School District. The campus is located at 1260 Union Street in Red Bluff.

== Academics ==
In 2010, Red Bluff High School was one of 28 high schools around the country to receive a $2 million grant dubbed the Smaller Learning Communities Grant. The goal of the program is to increase student achievement and graduation rates, and encourage more students to strive for a post-secondary education.

=== Athletics ===
Red Bluff High School is a part of the Northern Section California Interscholastic Federation.

==== Sports teams ====
Interscholastic Athletic Teams
Sport	Level	Season	Gender
Baseball	V, JV	Spring	Boys'
Basketball	V, JV, F	Winter	Boys', Girls'
Cross-Country	V, JV	Fall	Girls', Boys'
Football	V, JV, F	Fall	Boys'
Golf	V	Spring	Coed
Soccer	V	Fall (Girls'), Spring (Boys')	Boys', Girls'
Skiing	V	Winter	Boys', Girls'
Softball	V, JV	Spring	Girls'
Swimming	V, JV	Winter	Boys', Girls'
Tennis	V, JV	Fall (Girls'), Spring (Boys')	Boys', Girls'
Track (outdoor)	V, JV	Spring	Boys', Girls'
Volleyball	V, JV	Fall	Girls'
Wrestling	V, JV	Winter	Coed

- V = Varsity, JV = Junior Varsity, F = Freshman

== Notable alumni ==
Famous graduates of Red Bluff High School include:

- Michael Chiarello, celebrity chef
- William John Cooper, United States Commissioner of Education
- Clair Engle, California State Senator 1934-43, United States Congressman 1943-59, United States Senator 1959-64. In April 1964, after two surgeries for brain tumors had paralyzed him and robbed him of his power of speech, he insisted on being wheeled onto the Senate floor to cast a crucial vote to stop a southern filibuster designed to block the landmark civil rights bill. When the secretary called, "Mr Engle." there was no response. From his wheelchair Engle slowly raised his hand and touched his eye, indicating an "aye" vote. The filibuster was blocked and the bill passed. Engle died a few weeks later.
- Gale Gilbert, QB University of California Golden Bears, Seattle Seahawks, Buffalo Bills, San Diego Chargers; only player in NFL history to play in five (5) consecutive NFL Championship (Super Bowl) games (four with Buffalo Bills and one with San Diego Chargers) and be on the losing end in all five(5) contests. Also played on the Red Bluff Little League team that won the national championship and played Taiwan in the 1974 World Series.
- Bob Grim, end on Oregon State's 1966 Rose Bowl team; drafted by the Minnesota Vikings in the 2nd round of the 1967 draft, played on their 1969 NFC championship team and in Super Bowl VI; traded to New York Giants, then to the Chicago Bears and finally back to the Vikings, where he played on their 1976 NFC championship team and in Super Bowl XI
- Marv Grissom, Pitcher on the 1954 New York Giants World Series champions, member of the 1954 National League All-Star Team
- James Servera Jr., Hair Department head for TV. Shows such as; Drunk History, The real O'Neals, You're the Worst, Agents of Shield and Raising Hope.

== Miscellaneous ==
Several films have been shot on the Red Bluff High School campus over the years. In 1997, Good Morning America filmed an introduction segment on the Red Bluff High School parking lot.

In the 1960s voters turned down a bond proposal designed to replace the old high school building. A short time later, in what was viewed by some as "an amazing coincidence," the high school burned to the ground. The new buildings were built and the footprint of the old one is now occupied by tennis courts.

== See also ==
- Education in California
