= San Domenico School =

Private, coeducational, school in San Anselmo, California, United States

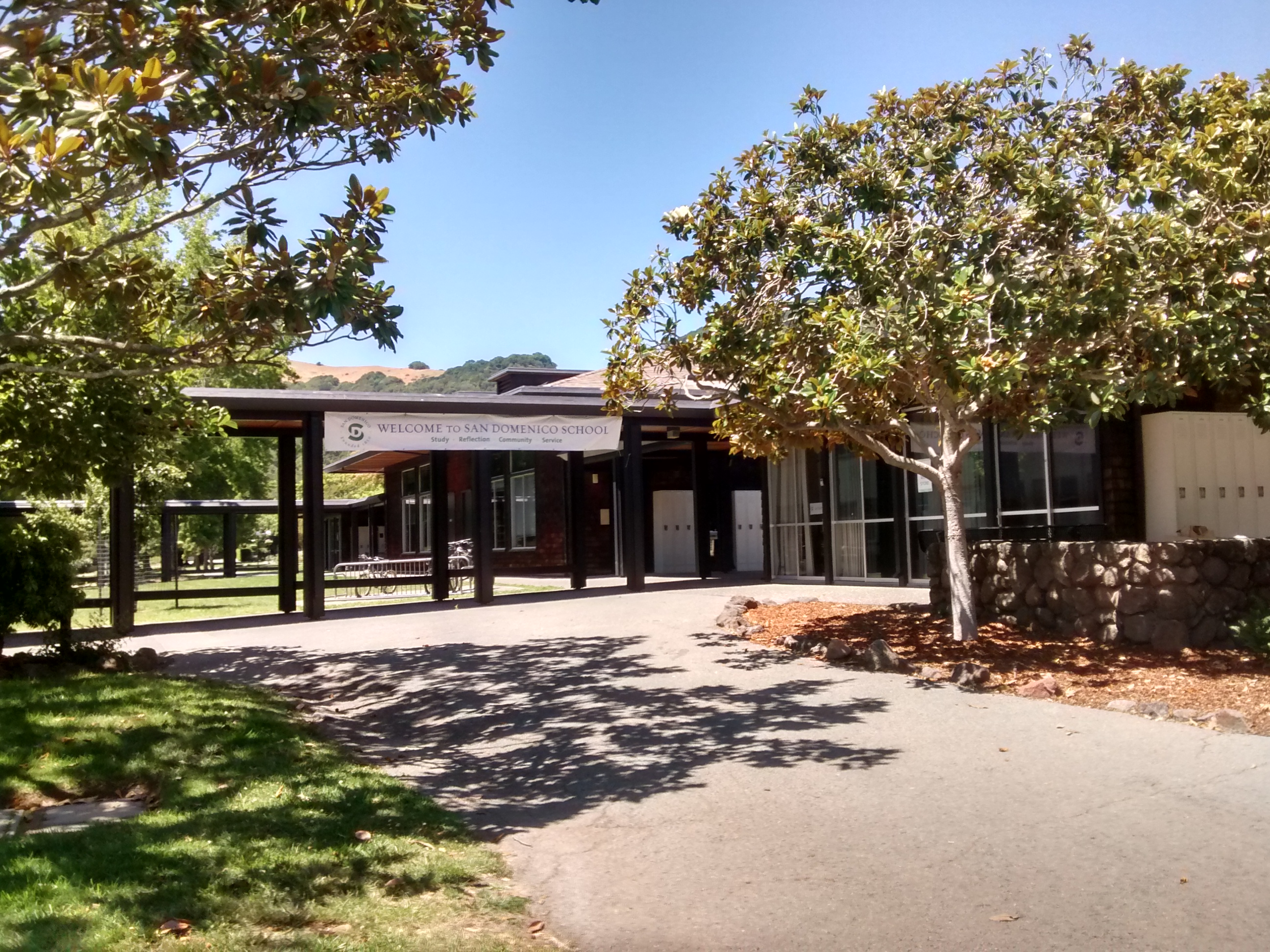
- San Domenico School in July 2016

Location
- 1500 Butterfield Road; San Anselmo, (Marin County), California 94960; United States; 38°1′8″N 122°35′23″W

Information
- Type: Private, Coeducational, Boarding school (9–12)
- Motto: Study, Reflection, Community, Service
- Established: 1850; 176 years ago
- NCES School ID: A0300549
- Head of school: Paul Sanders
- Teaching staff: 92.3 (FTE)
- Grades: K-12
- Enrollment: 680 (2024)
- Student to teacher ratio: 7.4
- Campus size: 515 acres (2.08 km^{2})
- Colors: Green and Blue
- Athletics: Mark Churchill (Director)
- Team name: Panthers
- Accreditation: Western Association of Schools and Colleges
- Publication: "School Ties"
- Yearbook: Veritas
- Tuition: 2034-25: $46,575 (K-5) $50,850 (6–8) $65,000 (9–12)
- Affiliation: National Association of Independent Schools
- Website: www.sandomenico.org

San Domenico School is the oldest independent, private, coed day and boarding school in California and the closest coed boarding school to San Francisco, California. The school currently enrolls 680 boys and girls in Grades Kindergarten through Twelfth Grade. It is a member of the National Association of Independent Schools. The mascot is a Panther. The school colors are blue and green.

== History ==
Founded in 1850 in Monterey by Mother Mary of the Cross Goemaere, O.P., of the Dominican Order, as St. Catherine Academy (not to be confused with St. Catherine's Academy), San Domenico is the oldest independent school in California. In 1965 the school moved to its present location in Sleepy Hollow, San Anselmo. In 2014, the school's high school became coed, and officially became non-religious in 2017.

== Campus ==
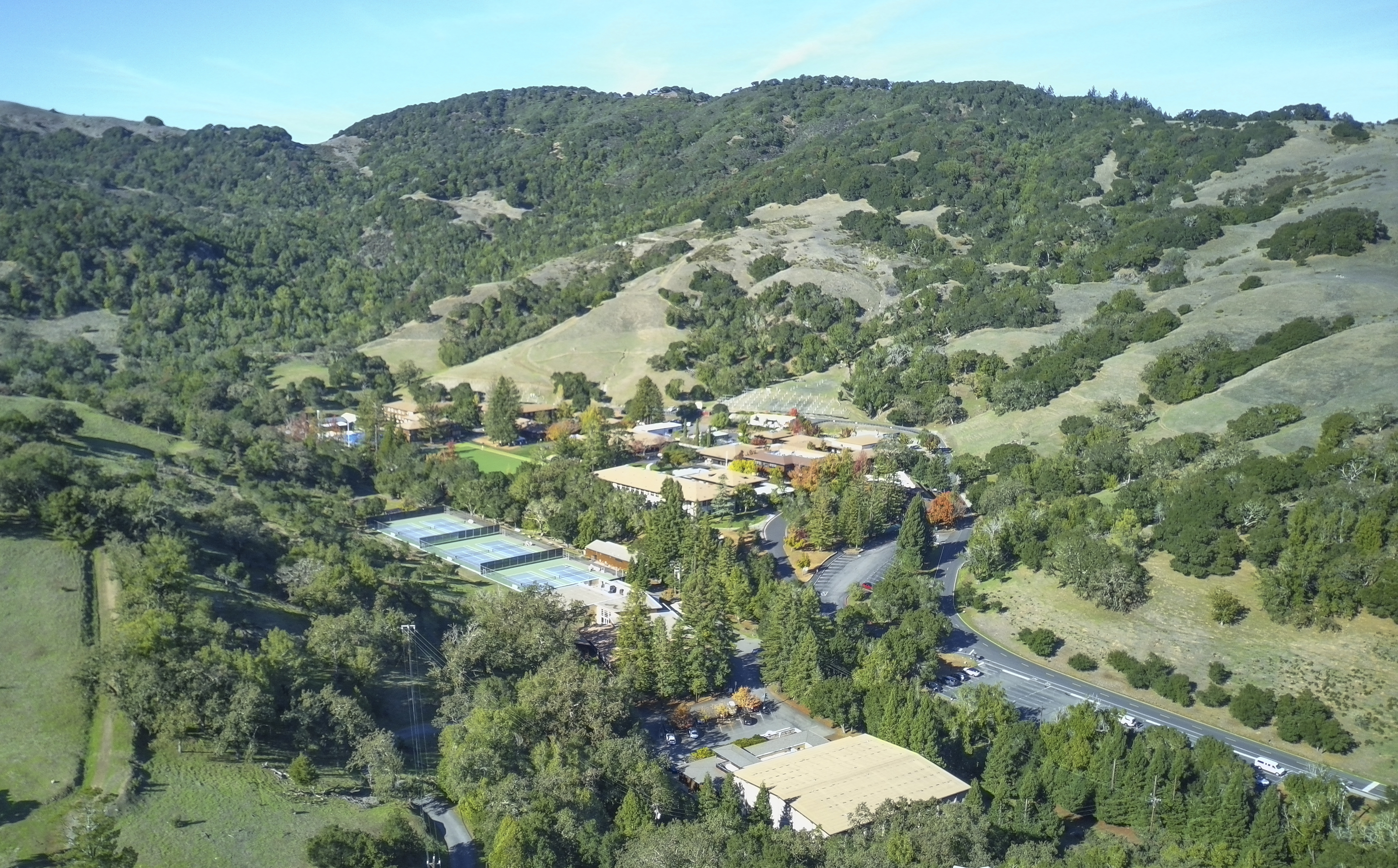
aerial view of the San Domenico School

The campus is situated on 515 acres (0.803 mi2) and includes a music conservatory, digital arts lab, riding stables, hiking and mountain biking trails, swimming center, gymnasium, one-acre organic garden, large field, 2,358 solar panels, and six tennis courts.

=== Boarding program ===
San Domenico High School is a coeducational day, boarding and flex-boarding school. Boarding students live on-campus during the school year while flex boarding students spend Monday through Friday on campus and then return home for weekends. The boarding program has a large number of international students, including students from Brazil, Canada, Czech Republic, mainland China, Germany, Hong Kong, Italy, Mexico, Poland, Russia, Serbia, South Africa, South Korea, Switzerland, Rwanda, Taiwan, Thailand, Uganda, Vietnam, and Zimbabwe.

=== Virtuoso Program ===
San Domenico’s internationally recognized Music Conservatory and Virtuoso Program (VP) is designed for high school students who are developing their potential as professional string musicians and wish to dedicate themselves to an intensive program of pre-college musical and academic studies. Day and boarding options are available for students from across the Bay Area and around the world.

=== Bus system ===
San Domenico administers one of the most extensive school bus route systems in the Bay Area. Grade levels K – 12 utilize the bus system, and service covers the Bay Area, including Oakland, San Francisco, and Novato.

== Organization ==
It is member of the National Association of Independent Schools (NAIS), California Association of Independent Schools (CAIS), and Western Association of Schools & Colleges (WASC).

== Academics ==
- Over 90% of the Class of 2020 were accepted into one of their top choice colleges.

=== Service Learning ===
All students are required to take the social justice course in their junior year, which helps students develop a systemic approach to understanding the social and environmental challenges of our day. Each student chooses a cause and initiates an independent action plan. The projects span from local initiatives within the school community and county to global initiatives around the world.

== Reputation ==
San Domenico School is a recognized Common Sense Media Signature School (Digital Citizenship Certified).

The San Domenico High School Theatre Arts Group was one of 50 school theatre groups in North America selected to perform in the Edinburgh Fringe Festival in 2007, 2010, and 2013.

San Domenico School received the Green Ribbon Schools Award from the US Department of Education for excellence in sustainability practices in 2014. San Domenico was the first school in Marin County to receive this honor.

San Domenico School’s Virtuoso Program Orchestra da Camera was the Festival Grand Champion and First Place String Orchestra at the National Orchestra Festival competition in 2010, 2008, and 2005.

== Athletics ==
The school offers cross country, soccer, tennis, golf, basketball, swimming, track, baseball, flag football, badminton, volleyball, lacrosse, and sailing.
