= View Park Preparatory High School =

View Park Preparatory Accelerated Charter High School

Location
- 5701 Crenshaw Blvd; Los Angeles, California 90043, United States; 33.9903°N 118.3313°W

Information
- Type: College preparatory charter school
- Motto: "Fight the fight, with View Park Knights"
- Established: October 2003
- School district: Los Angeles Unified School District
- Principal: Shuron Owens
- Faculty: 21.50 (FTE)
- Grades: 9-12
- Student to teacher ratio: 26.37
- Colors: Cardinal and Black
- Athletics: Rugby, Golf, Baseball, Football, Basketball
- Mascot: Knights
- Website: www.icefps.org/view-park-high-school.html

View Park Preparatory Accelerated Charter High School (known informally as View Park Prep) is a college preparatory high school in South region of Los Angeles, California, United States.

The school first opened in 2003 and currently enrolls about 700 students. The school is a part of the Inner City Education Foundation.

== History ==
View Park Preparatory High School opened in 2003. The school draws students from several affluent neighborhoods, including Baldwin Hills and View Park-Windsor Hills for which it got its name. The school's student body began with students from wealthier African-American communities. Most of the students who attended View Park Preparatory lived near this area of Los Angeles.

== Background ==
View Park Preparatory High School is a college preparatory high school in Los Angeles, California, serving students in the more affluent African-American neighborhoods. The school first opened its doors for the 2003–2004 school year, following the high demand for a new high school in the community that can cater to African American, Latin American and other students, offering them a college preparatory environment and preparing them for college and careers. The school followed the establishment of elementary and middle schools, which opened in 1999 and 2002, respectively. By 2008 it was reported that the school had some 6,000 students on its waiting list and that its students were scoring far above the students at the neighboring non-charter public schools on California's Academic Performance Index.

The school is a part of the Inner City Education Foundation and was the sister school to both Frederick Douglass Academy and Lou Dantzler Preparatory Schools. View Park Preparatory High School's mission is to ensure that all students achieve and excel academically in higher education.

=== Athletics ===
The school is well known for its small preparatory school environment as well as its athletics. The school houses three athletic programs including football, basketball, baseball, swimming and rugby.

== The Ellen DeGeneres Show ==
In 2015, the school was featured on the comedy talk show The Ellen DeGeneres Show, recognizing their athletics and academics department.

The school is accredited by the Western Association of Schools and Colleges and is a public charter school authorized by Los Angeles Unified School District. In 2015, the school was featured on "The Black List", as one of the "Eight Excellent High Schools For African Americans". The demographics of the campus include 95% of the students being African American with the remaining 5% Latin American. Many of the students come from the affluent View Park Estates neighborhood as well as the surrounding community of South Los Angeles, California.

=== Metro Rail ===
The Hyde Park light rail station via the Metro K Line serves the charter school.
