= Saint Francis Central Coast Catholic High School =

St. Francis High School Salesian College Preparatory

Location
- 2400 East Lake Avenue; Watsonville, Santa Cruz County, California 95076; United States; 36°56′20″N 121°44′28.5″W

Information
- Type: Private
- Motto: Reason, Religion, and Loving Kindness
- Religious affiliations: Catholic; Salesian
- Patron saint: St. John Bosco
- Established: 2001
- Principal: Art Walker
- Grades: 9-12
- Gender: Co-educational
- Colors: Burgundy and Gray
- Mascot: Sharks
- Team name: Sharks
- Accreditation: Western Association of Schools and Colleges
- Yearbook: The Wave
- Tuition: $17,890 (2026-2027)
- Website: www.stfrancishigh.net

Saint Francis Central Coast Catholic High School is a Catholic school in Watsonville, California. The school was named after Saint Francis of Assisi and Saint Francis de Sales, and is operated by an independent corporation that is a partnership between the Salesian Society and the Diocese of Monterey.

== History and early development ==
The origins of Saint Francis School go back to 1869. In that year the Catholic Diocese of Monterey-Los Angeles opened a boys' orphanage in the Pajaro Valley, on the outskirts of the farming community of Watsonville. The orphanage was placed under the patronage of the Virgin Mary as the Immaculate Conception. In 1871, a group of Franciscans (Order of Friars Minor) from Germany assumed responsibility for the orphanage.

Originally Saint Francis School and the Immaculate Conception Orphanage were set off on the northern side Hecker Pass Road and overlooked excellent farm land. As the program grew, the friars developed the agricultural program as a way to support the orphanage and the school. The presence of the school also attracted the support of local farmers, many of whom were Catholic immigrants from Ireland, Italy and Croatia. As farm families looked to St Francis as the local spiritual center (the parish church was several miles away), the Franciscan friars opened the school chapel for Sunday Services and daily Masses. The school chapel, dedicated to the Virgin Mary, became known simply as the 'Valley Church'.

The Franciscan friars remained at Saint Francis School through the remainder of the 19th century, enlarging the plant, developing the farm, and serving hundreds of needy boys. At the beginning of the 20th century, the friars launched a building program. It was time to move out of the wooden dwellings and build a modern plant. The friars planned to build a whole new style of residential program for the boys, with twelve group homes to be built on three sides of a central plaza, and a school building, dining facilities, and a new Valley Church on the fourth side. The building program was launched in 1913. Unfortunately, one year later World War I broke out in Europe. The fact that the Franciscan Community in the Pajaro Valley was largely made up of Germans created difficulties in the minds of local businessmen. The contractor that the friars had hired, a German-American, was boycotted by those in building supplies. As a result, he could only procure inferior materials for the building of the new school and residences.

In 1995 a movement for a new Catholic high school in the Diocese of Monterey took off with the support of Bishop Sylvester Ryan and the Salesians of Don Bosco. From 1998 to 2001, funds were raised, plans made, students recruited, teachers hired, and construction begun.

In 2001, the school opened with 35 freshmen and sophomores at a temporary location in Santa Cruz. Students, teachers, staff members, and administrators commuted to Holy Cross Parish Hall for classes, while construction was underway on the new classrooms being built at the Watsonville site.

During the summer months the school moved from Santa Cruz into the present facilities. The dedication service was held on August 25, 2002, and classes started the next day.

== Sports ==
Volleyball, Cross Country, Football, Tennis, Basketball, Soccer, Track and Field, Golf, Baseball, Softball, Wrestling.

== See also ==
- Santa Cruz County high schools
