= La Reina High School =

La Reina High School & Middle School

Location
- 106 West Janss Road; Thousand Oaks, (Ventura County), California 91360; United States; 34°12′11″N 118°52′35″W

Information
- Type: Private
- Motto: "Educating confident, capable and compassionate leaders since 1964"
- Religious affiliation: Roman Catholic
- Established: 1964
- Head of school: Principal Margaret Marschner, President Tony Guevara
- Grades: 6-12
- Gender: Girls
- Campus size: 40-acre (160,000 m^{2})
- Colors: Green and Gold
- Athletics: Volleyball, Beach Volleyball, Tennis, Basketball, Soccer, Equestrian, Swimming, Lacrosse, Softball, Cross Country, Track and Field
- Mascot: Regent
- Team name: Regents
- Accreditation: Western Association of Schools and Colleges
- Newspaper: "The Herald"
- Yearbook: "The Courier"
- Tuition: $20,950 (High School tuition 2022-2023 school year), $18,550 (Middle School tuition 2022-23 school year)
- Affiliation: Sisters of Notre Dame
- Website: https://www.lareina.com

La Reina High School was a Catholic college preparatory for middle and high school girls founded in 1964. La Reina was an independent, private school serving students in Los Angeles and Ventura County. Following drops in enrollment over the prior eight years, the school announced they were closing after the 2023–24 school year. However, in April, a support group of alumni and parents secured potential funds to purchase Pinecrest Schools to set up La Reina Academy. After many failed efforts to increase enrollment in the new La Reina Academy program, the project fell through and La Reina officially closed.
