= St. Bernard's High School (Eureka, California) =

St. Bernard's Academy

Location
- 222 Dollison Street; Eureka, California 95501; United States
- Coordinates: 40°47′2″N 124°10′4″W

Information
- Type: Private secondary school
- Religious affiliation: Roman Catholic
- Established: 1954
- Founder: Sisters of St. Joseph
- President: Paul Shanahan
- Teaching staff: 18.8 (on an FTE basis)
- Grades: 7–12
- Enrollment: 243 (2017–18)
- Student to teacher ratio: 12.9
- Colors: Green, black, and white
- Nickname: Crusaders
- Rival: Eureka High School, Ferndale High School
- Accreditation: Western Association of Schools and Colleges
- Yearbook: Crusader
- Website: saintbernards.us

St. Bernard's Academy is a private, Roman Catholic high school in Eureka, California. Located in the Roman Catholic Diocese of Santa Rosa in California, it is run independently by St. Bernard's Academy, Inc.

== Background ==
St. Bernard's was established as an elementary school in 1912 by the Sisters of St. Joseph. St. Bernard's High School was established in 1954. St. Bernard's currently offers a preschool, junior and senior high.

== Athletics ==
St. Bernard's is a member of the Humboldt-Del Norte Conference (Redwood Empire) of the North Coast Section of the California Interscholastic Federation of the National Federation of State High School Associations. The following sports are offered: Football, Football Cheer Team, Girls' Volleyball, Girls' Soccer, Cross country, Girls' Tennis, Boys' Basketball, Girls' Basketball, Basketball Cheerleading, Wrestling, Baseball, Girls' Softball, Boys' Tennis, Track and Golf.

== Notable alumni ==
- Greg Shanahan - former MLB pitcher for the Los Angeles Dodgers.
