= Healdsburg High School =

High School in Healdsburg, California, United States

Coordinates: 38.6226878°N 122.8672165°W

Healdsburg High School is a high school in Healdsburg, Sonoma County, California, United States.

== School information ==
Healdsburg High School is a comprehensive four-year school for grades nine through twelve, and was founded in 1880. Their mascot is the Greyhound, which celebrates Healdsburg's strong athletic legacy. The school colors are black and cardinal red. Healdsburg High School was recently awarded a six-year term of accreditation, the longest term possible, by the Western Association of Schools and Colleges. HHS is known for its strong academics, ability to gain students entrance into prestigious universities around the country, and strong community support. The current principal for HHS is Tait Danhausen, and the assistant principal is Jon Weller.

== Population ==
Currently, about 640 students are enrolled at Healdsburg High School. Just over half the students are of Latino descent, with the other half being predominantly Caucasian. Enrollment has diminished significantly over the last few years and the school's population is now nearly exclusively made up of Healdsburg residents. Windsor residents attended the school for decades until Windsor High School opened in the late 1990s.

== Test scores ==
While Healdsburg High School has retained a stable graduation rate of above 90% in recent years, its students consistently score lower in math and reading proficiency exams compared to other high schools in California. On the 2016 CAASPP written exam, a state benchmark test of reading and mathematic ability, only 20% and 38% of students met state expectations for math and reading proficiency, respectively. Similarly, in 2019, 63% of students received a score of "standard not met" on the mathematics portion of the CAASPP, and 30% failed to meet standards for language arts. However, students who took AP exams ranked in the 90th national percentile for AP test proficiency in the same year.

== Awards ==
Healdsburg High has been named a California Distinguished School twice: in 1988 and 1990.

== Clubs ==
Healdsburg High School offers many clubs, including:

- Mountain Biking Club:All ages, cross-country (competitive or not)
- American Sign Language Club: For students interested in learning American Sign Language
- Art: Promotes an interest in art
- Ballet Folklorico: Learn Mexican folk dancing
- CSF (California Scholarship Federation): Academic honor society
- FFA (Future Farmers of America): Promote leadership in agriculture
- French Club: Promotes French culture
- Key Club: Community service
- MAYO: Mexican American Youth Organization
- Peer Helpers: Provide peer support
- Progressive Club: To act environmentally and as human rights activists
- Rotary Interact: Perform services for the school and local communities
- Science Alliance: Science tutoring; arrange for speakers to give science-oriented presentations

== Sports ==
Fall Sports

- Cross Country
- Football
- Tennis (Girls)
- Volleyball (Girls)
- Soccer (Girls)
- Soccer (Boys)
- Golf (Girls)
- Cheerleading (Co-ed)

Winter Sports

- Basketball (Girls)
- Basketball (Boys)
- Wrestling
- Cheerleading (Co-ed)

Spring Sports

- Tennis (Boys)
- Track
- Baseball (Boys)
- Softball (Girls
- Golf (Boys)
- Swimming & Diving
