= Bret Harte Union High School =

Coordinates: 38°04′45″N 120°33′13″W

Location
- 323 South Main; Angels Camp, California 95221

Information
- Type: Public
- Established: 1904
- Principal: Jacob Holt
- Staff: 33.49 (FTE)
- Faculty: 45
- Enrollment: 566 (2023–2024)
- Student to teacher ratio: 16.90
- Campus: Small-Size City
- Color
- Mascot: Bullfrog
- Website: www.brethartebullfrogs.org

Bret Harte Union High School is a public high school serving Angels Camp, California, the only incorporated city in Calaveras County, California.

== History ==
The school was established in 1905 and is named after American poet Bret Harte.

== Location ==
The school's official address is 321 South Main, P.O. Box 7000, Angels Camp, CA, 95221. Some directories indicate that the school is located in the unincorporated community of Altaville, California, at 364 Murphys Grade Road, Altaville, CA, 95221,

== Notable alumni ==
- James Hecker — Lt. General, United States Air Force
- T.J. Dillashaw — Former two-time UFC Bantamweight Champion
- Kyle Rasmussen — World Cup ski champion
- Neriah Davis — Playboy playmate, March 1997
