= West Campus High School =

Location
- 5022 58th Street; Sacramento, California 95820; United States; 38.530929°N 121.43888°W

Information
- Former name: Hiram Johnson West Campus
- Type: Public secondary
- Established: 2002
- School district: Sacramento City Unified School District
- Principal: John McMeekin
- Teaching staff: 32.09 (on FTE basis)
- Grades: 9-12
- Enrollment: 881 (2023–24)
- Student to teacher ratio: 27.45
- Campus type: Suburban
- Colors: Cardinal and Grey
- Athletics conference: CIF Sac-Joaquin Section; Capital Valley Conference
- Mascot: Warriors
- Newspaper: West Campus Times
- Website: West Campus High School

West Campus High School is a public college preparatory magnet high school in Sacramento, California. The school serves around 800 students in grades 9–12 in the Sacramento City Unified School District. It was founded as a satellite high school of the nearby Hiram W. Johnson High School in 1983, under the name Hiram Johnson West Campus, and separated from Hiram Johnson in the year 2000. The high school officially opened on September 3, 2001. West Campus is known for sending the most graduates to college, and has been recognized for doing so by the Sacramento Bee in 2019.

== Academics ==
West Campus offers a total of 14 AP (Advanced Placement) courses currently including AP Government, AP Biology, AP US History, AP Art, AP Calculus AB, AP Calculus BC, AP Statistics, AP Spanish, AP French and more. Currently, West Campus offers one honors class, Honors English 10. Elective courses include Advanced Art, Yearbook, Band, and Engineering. West Campus provides courses that align with the "A-G requirements", which are mandatory for each student in order to graduate.

=== Ranking ===
In 2025 U.S. News evaluated West Campus at 98.9%, ranking it 197th in the nation (out of 17,655 ranked high schools), 22nd in California, and 1st in the Sacramento Metro Area. Compared to the previous year, the ranking has slightly declined.

=== Standardized Testing ===
West Campus offers free SAT, PSAT, and AP exams to its students. West Campus also places in the top 25% of all California high-schools in terms of standardized testing scores.

=== Engineering Program ===
West Campus is known for its 4-year engineering program, which is guided by Project Lead the Way The 4-year program consists of these courses: Year 1 – Introduction to Engineering Design, Year 2 – Principles of Engineering, Year 3 – Civil Engineering & Architecture, and Year 4 – Engineering Design & Development.

== Sports ==
There are a total of 18 sports that take place over the seasons of Fall, Winter, and Spring. A few sports at West Campus include cheer, golf, soccer, basketball, cross country, track, baseball, softball, volleyball, wrestling, swim, and tennis. The high school has four soccer teams, four basketball teams, two baseball teams, two softball teams, two golf teams (men's and women's) and several volleyball teams. During the COVID-19 pandemic, practices were limited to voluntary outside conditioning.

== Music ==
The West Campus music department consists of a music appreciation program, a marching band, a drumline, and color guard. These groups are affiliated with the Northern California Band Association.

== Admission ==
Enrollment is via application and transcripts of grades 7 and 8 marks. When the number of acceptable applicants exceeds the number of available spaces, students are chosen via lottery. In the year 2024, PSAT 8/9 scores were deprecated as means of evaluation.

== The Foundation for Excellence ==
The West Campus Foundation for Excellence (WCFE) is the school's parent-teacher organization that helps to provide for and improve the student community. They raise funds that go towards events, Yearbook, Drama, Band, athletics, college tours, classroom texts, and scholarships. They also coordinate with the Academic Student Body (ASB) with events such as staff appreciation lunch and senior breakfast. The organization does not require an application or a fee to join as of 2022. Membership is open to all, but the foundation encourages families to sign up for their newsletter.

== Notable alumni ==
- Ryan Guzman, actor (graduated 2005).
- Steven Silva, actor (graduated 2004).

== COVID-19 response ==
West Campus High School and other schools within the Sacramento City Unified School District shut down in-person classes as of March 2020, and adopted distance learning through Zoom, a video communications application.
