= Upper Lake High School =

Coordinates: 39.1660440°N 122.9017307°W

Location
- 675 Clover Valley Road; Upper Lake, California 95485; United States

Information
- Type: Public high school
- School district: Upper Lake Union High School District
- Principal: Pat Iaccino
- Teaching staff: 18.67 (FTE)
- Grades: 9-12
- Enrollment: 331 (2023-2024)
- Student to teacher ratio: 17.73
- Mascot: Cougars
- Website: http://www.ulhs.k12.ca.us/

Upper Lake High School is a small public high school located in Upper Lake, California. It is the only comprehensive high school in the Upper Lake Union High School District.

== Academics ==
Upper Lake High offers AP courses in English, U.S. history, art history, and environmental science. It offers ROP (vocational) courses in robotics, digital media, digital arts, agriculture and natural resources, and agricultural mechanics. In December 2011, the AESA (Alternative Energy and Sustainable Agriculture) California partnership academy was established, funded by a grant from the California Environmental Protection Agency. Through the academy, students have the option to study agricultural, earth, and environmental science.

Upper Lake has not meet California's Adequate Yearly Progress (AYP) for standardized testing for several years, and began to receive federal funding for program improvement (PI) in 2012.

== Extracurricular activities ==
Upper Lake's athletic teams include football, soccer, volleyball, cheerleading, cross country, basketball, wrestling, baseball, softball, and track.

== Demographics ==
Upper Lake's student body is 57% white, 26% Hispanic or Latino, 9% American Indian or Alaska Native, 4% Multiracial Americans, 3% Asian, 1% black or African American, and <1% Native Hawaiian or Pacific Islander.
