= Julian High School (California) =

Julian Union High School

Location
- 1656 Highway 78; Julian, California 92036; United States
- Coordinates: 33.0786°N 116.6011°W

Information
- School type: Public Secondary
- School district: Julian Union High School District
- Teaching staff: 9.45 (FTE)
- Grades: 9–12
- Gender: Coed
- Enrollment: 130 (2017–18)
- Student to teacher ratio: 13.76
- Colors: Maroon & White
- Team name: Eagles
- Website: www.juhsd.org

Julian Union High School (commonly known as Julian High School), is a public 4-year high school located in Julian, California. It is part of the Julian Union High School District.

The federal New Deal Works Projects Administration was involved in the construction of the school, athletic field, bleachers, and surrounding rubble wall according to a bronze plaque at the entrance of the campus and date stamps in the concrete of the bleachers. Year of construction was 1940.

== See also ==
- List of high schools in San Diego County, California
- List of school districts in San Diego County, California
