= Math and Science College Preparatory =

- Math and Science College Preparatory Crest

Location
- 3200 W. Adams Blvd; Los Angeles, CA 90018; United States; 34°01′53″N 118°19′08″W

Information
- Type: Public Charter
- Established: August 2013
- School district: LAUSD
- Principal: Bernice Avancena
- Grades: 9-12
- Campus size: 1.7 acres (0.69 ha)
- Campus type: Urban
- Colors: Red and black
- Team name: The Sharks
- Website: www.mscollegeprep.org

Math and Science College Preparatory (often shortened to "MSCP") is an independent public charter school located in the West Adams neighborhood of Los Angeles, California. MSCP offers students in grades nine through twelve opportunities to take classes that focus on an engineering curriculum in order to prepare students to enter STEM fields at four-year colleges.
