= Modoc High School (Alturas, California) =

Location
- 900 North Main Street; Alturas, California; United States; 41°29′32″N 120°32′32″W

Information
- Type: Public
- School district: Modoc Joint Unified School District
- NCES School ID: 062519003764
- Staff: 15.72 (on FTE basis)
- Grades: 9 to 12
- Enrollment: 237 (2023–2024)
- Student to teacher ratio: 15.08
- Colors: Purple and white
- Mascot: Braves

Modoc High School (MHS) is a small high school located in Alturas, California. It is one of two high schools located in Modoc County, California.

In 1994, Modoc High School was awarded the California Distinguished School award.

== Notable alumni ==
- Kayte Christensen, color commentator and former professional basketball player
