= American Conference (CIF) =

American Conference is one of the three conferences of the CIF Northern Section, a high school athletics governing body part of the California Interscholastic Federation. The conference is divided into several leagues.

== Members ==
Institution	Location	Colors	Established	Enrollment	Team name	Joined
Anderson New Technology High School	Anderson	-	2002	-	-	-
Biggs High School	Biggs		-	175	Wolverines	-
Burney Junior Senior High School	Burney		-	-	Raiders	-
Chester Junior-Senior High School	Chester		-	-	Volcanoes	-
Colusa High School	Colusa		-	375	Hawks	-
Durham High School	Durham		1922	285	Trojans	-
East Nicolaus High School	East Nicolaus		-	-	Spartans	-
Esparto High School	Esparto		-	-	Spartans	-
Etna High School	Etna		1891		Lions	-
Fall River High School	Fall River Mills		1911	-	Bulldogs	-
Hamilton Union High School	Hamilton City		1917	320	Braves	-
Liberty Christian School	Redding		1965	-	Patriots	-
Live Oak High School	Live Oak		-	-	Lions	-
Los Molinos High School	Los Molinos		-	-	Bulldogs	-
Maxwell High School	Maxwell		-	-	Panthers	-
Mercy High School	Red Bluff		1882	-	Warriors	-
Modoc High School	Alturas		-	285	Braves	-
Mt. Shasta High School	Mount Shasta		-	430	Bears	-
Pierce High School	Arbuckle		-	-	Bears	-
Portola Junior/Senior High School	Portola		-	-	Tigers	-
Quincy Junior-Senior High School	Quincy		-	-	Trojans	-
Redding Christian School	Palo Cedro		1990	530	Lions	-
Trinity High School	Weaverville		-	350	Wolves	-
Weed High School	Weed		-	200	Cougars	-
Williams Junior Senior High School	Williams		-	-	Yellowjackets	-
Willows High School	Willows		-	-	Honkers	-
Winters High School	Winters		1891	-	Warriors	-

== Leagues ==
- 5 Star League
- Feather River League (soccer only)
- Mid-Valley League
- Mountain Valley League
- Sacramento Valley League
- Shasta-Cascade League
