= Mill Fire (2022) =

2022 wildfire in Northern California

- Part of the 2022 California wildfires
- Date: September 2, 2022 –; September 13, 2022
- Location: Weed, Siskiyou County, Northern California
- Coordinates: 41.4303°N 122.3852°W

Statistics
- Burned area: 3,935 acres (1,592 ha)

Impacts
- Deaths: 2
- Injuries: 3
- Structures destroyed: 118 (26 damaged)

Ignition
- Cause: Possible equipment failure at lumber mill

Map
- Location in Northern California

Location of Mill Fire

The Mill Fire was a fast-moving, deadly and destructive wildfire that burned during the 2022 California wildfire season, destroying parts of the communities of Weed, Lake Shastina and Edgewood in Siskiyou County in the U.S. state of California. Igniting during hot, dry & windy conditions on September 2, 2022, amid a record-breaking heat wave that spanned much of the state, the Mill Fire moved rapidly to the north. Most of the fire's acreage burned and structures destroyed occurred on the first day, due to its predominantly wind-driven nature. The Mill Fire burned 3,935 acres (1,592 hectares), destroyed 118 structures, and damaged 26 more. The fire also caused 2 fatalities when two residents of Weed were unable to escape the quick-moving blaze in its first hours. The fire was fully contained on September 14, 2022.

== Background ==
In previous years, several significant wildfires had burned in Siskiyou County in the vicinity of the Mill Fire. In 2014, the Boles Fire started on the south side of Weed and, driven by wind, destroyed 158 structures in the town's downtown in a single day despite burning only about 500 acres, in a fashion similar to the Mill Fire. In 2021, the Lava Fire burned dozens of structures and 26,409 acres on the slopes of Mount Shasta, threatening Lake Shastina.

== Progression ==
The fire began at approximately 12:49 p.m. PDT during a red flag warning near Woodridge Court and Woodridge Way igniting a large warehouse on the property of Roseburg Forest Products, a lumber mill north of the town of Weed, before quickly igniting the nearby vegetation and rapidly beginning to burn through homes in the nearby neighborhood of Lincoln Heights. Propelled by southeast winds up to 24 MPH, with 36 MPH gusts, the fire aggressively exploded northward toward Lake Shastina where additional structures began to burn from spotting fires that regularly jumped natural firebreaks in the area. Within 2 hours, the fire had reportedly grown to 555 acres as evacuation orders went out to the entirety of the Weed and Lake Shastina communities. By 2:50 p.m., the fireline had jumped Jackson Ranch Road, several miles north of the ignition point, and had begun burning into the community of Lake Shastina. Within another hour, the fire would reportedly be 900 acres as firefighting personnel scrambled to establish resources in areas that immediately required them. Within several hours the fire perimeter had doubled to 2,580 acres with 0% containment, as a state of emergency was declared for Siskiyou County by Governor of California Gavin Newsom.

At 3:48 p.m., a second fire was reported on Gazelle-Callahan Road, east of Gazelle Mountain, southeast of Gazelle in Siskiyou County and dubbed the Mountain Fire. As the Mountain Fire rapidly grew in size, resources became strained—the two fires were now spreading quickly, parallel to one another. Within several hours, the Mountain Fire would grow to 300 acres, however, resources remained largely committed to the Mill Fire due to the immediate need for structure protection while the Mountain Fire remained burning in the remote wilderness with comparatively little structure threat. By 10:00 p.m. Friday evening, the Mill Fire had ballooned to a reported 3,921 acres and the Mountain Fire to an estimated 600 acres.

== Effects ==
Two civilians were injured by the fire, with their injuries ranging in severity from moderate to critical. One person in critical condition was airlifted to UC Davis Medical Center for treatment. Two elderly women ultimately died in the fire; their loss of life was not made public until two days later.

The Mill and Mountain fires knocked out power to a combined 9,775 Pacific Power customers throughout the Siskiyou area on September 2.

== Cause ==
CalFire officials determined that the cause of the fire was mill operations at Roseburg Forest Products. The Roseburg Forest Products veneer mill where the fire broke out produced its own electricity in a cogeneration facility that used wood remnants to provide fuel. The leftover ash was then ejected and sprayed with water by a third-party machine to cool it. On September 7, Roseburg issued a press release announcing that the company was investigating the possibility that the machine had failed to sufficiently cool the ash, allowing a fire to break out. The company also said that it "planned to proactively provide up to $50 million for a community restoration fund for the initial recovery needs of impacted residents." Siskiyou County sheriff’s records obtained by the San Francisco Chronicle found that at least seven fires had been reported at the lumber mill over the eight years prior to the Mill Fire.

Roseburg was sued by more than 100 plaintiffs over its alleged role in the Mill Fire. Roseburg resumed operations at the facility in Weed on November 9 after installing new ash-handling equipment and updating its emergency response processes. On December 13, the company announced that it had reached a tentative settlement agreement with four law firms, representing over 700 plaintiffs, over the Mill Fire. The settlement amount was confidential.

== Growth and containment table ==
Fire containment status Gray: contained; Red: active; %: percent contained;
Date	Area burned	Personnel	Containment
September 2	3,921 acres (1,587 ha; 15.87 km^{2})	—	
September 3	4,254 acres (1,722 ha; 17.22 km^{2})	—	
September 4	4,252 acres (1,721 ha; 17.21 km^{2})	827	
September 5	4,263 acres (1,725 ha; 17.25 km^{2})	723	
September 6	3,953 acres (1,600 ha; 16.00 km^{2})	608	
September 7	3,953 acres (1,600 ha; 16.00 km^{2})	585	
September 8	3,953 acres (1,600 ha; 16.00 km^{2})	373	
September 9	3,953 acres (1,600 ha; 16.00 km^{2})	182	
September 10	3,953 acres (1,600 ha; 16.00 km^{2})	101	
September 11	3,953 acres (1,600 ha; 16.00 km^{2})	92	
September 12	3,953 acres (1,600 ha; 16.00 km^{2})	92	
September 13	3,953 acres (1,600 ha; 16.00 km^{2})	92	

== See also ==
- 2022 California wildfires
- Boles Fire (a much-smaller destructive 2014 wildfire that burned in a similar footprint through Weed, California)
- Lava Fire
