= Edgewood, California =

- Unincorporated Community; Census Designated Place
- Location in Siskiyou County and the state of California

- Location in the United States
- Coordinates: 41°27′44″N 122°25′34″W
- Country: United States of America
- State: California
- County: Siskiyou

Area
  - Total: 1.021 sq mi (2.644 km^{2})
  - Land: 1.016 sq mi (2.632 km^{2})
  - Water: 0.0046 sq mi (0.012 km^{2}) 0.46%
- Elevation: 2,956 ft (901 m)

Population (2020)
  - Total: 72
  - Density: 71/sq mi (27/km^{2})
- Time zone: UTC-8 (Pacific (PST))
  - Summer (DST): UTC-7 (PDT)
- ZIP code: 96094
- Area code: 530
- FIPS code: 06-21530
- GNIS feature ID: 2408045

Edgewood is a census-designated place (CDP) in Siskiyou County, California, United States. Its population is 72 as of the 2020 census, up from 43 from the 2010 census. Edgewood is located three miles north of the town of Weed.

== Geography ==
According to the United States Census Bureau, the CDP has a total area of 1.0 square mile (2.6 km^{2}), of which 99.54% is land and 0.46% is water.

== Demographics ==
Historical population
Census	Pop.	Note	%±
2000	67		—
2010	43		−35.8%
2020	72		67.4%
U.S. Decennial Census; 1860–1870 1880-1890; 1900 1910 1920; 1930 1940 1950; 1960 1970 1980; 1990 2000 2010

Edgewood first appeared as a census designated place in the 2000 U.S. census.

=== 2010 ===
The 2010 United States census reported that Edgewood had a population of 43. The population density was 42.1 inhabitants per square mile (16.3/km^{2}). The racial makeup was 41 (95.3%) White, 0 (0.0%) African American, 0 (0.0%) Native American, 0 (0.0%) Asian, 0 (0.0%) Pacific Islander, 1 (2.3%) from other races, and 1 (2.3%) from two or more races. Hispanic or Latino of any race were 2 persons (4.7%).

The census reported that 43 people (100% of the population) lived in households, 0 (0%) lived in non-institutionalized group quarters and 0 (0%) were institutionalized.

There were 18 households, of which 5 (27.8%) had children under the age of 18 living in them, 15 (83.3%) were opposite-sex married couples living together, 0 (0%) had a female householder with no husband present, 0 (0%) had a male householder with no wife present. There were 0 (0%) unmarried opposite-sex partnerships, and 0 (0%) same-sex married couples or partnerships. 3 households (16.7%) were made up of individuals, and 2 (11.1%) had someone living alone who was 65 years of age or older. The average household size was 2.39. There were 15 families (83.3% of all households); the average family size was 2.67.

9 people (20.9%) were under the age of 18, 1 people (2.3%) aged 18 to 24, 5 people (11.6%) aged 25 to 44, 22 people (51.2%) aged 45 to 64, and 6 people (14.0%) who were 65 years of age or older. The median age was 54.8 years. For every 100 females, there were 79.2 males. For every 100 females age 18 and over, there were 78.9 males.

There were 19 housing units at an average density of 18.6 per square mile (7.2/km^{2}), of which 16 (88.9%) were owner-occupied, and 2 (11.1%) were occupied by renters. The homeowner vacancy rate was 0%; the rental vacancy rate was 0%. 37 people (86.0% of the population) lived in owner-occupied housing units and 6 people (14.0%) lived in rental housing units.

=== 2000 ===
At the 2000 census. of 2000, there were 67 people, 25 households and 19 families residing in the CDP. The population density was 69.9 inhabitants per square mile (27.0/km^{2}). There were 25 housing units at an average density of 26.1 per square mile (10.1/km^{2}). The racial makeup was 88.06% White, 4.48% African American, 1.49% Native American, 1.49% Asian, and 4.48% from two or more races. Hispanic or Latino of any race were 7.46% of the population.

There were 25 households, of which 24.0% had children under the age of 18 living with them, 64.0% were married couples living together, 4.0% had a female householder with no husband present, and 24.0% were non-families. 16.0% of all households were made up of individuals, and 8.0% had someone living alone who was 65 years of age or older. The average household size was 2.68 and the average family size was 3.05.

28.4% of the population were under the age of 18, 3.0% from 18 to 24, 19.4% from 25 to 44, 28.4% from 45 to 64, and 20.9% who were 65 years of age or older. The median age was 45 years. For every 100 females, there were 97.1 males. For every 100 females age 18 and over, there were 108.7 males.

The median household income was $50,750 and the median family income was $50,500. Males had a median income of $38,750 and females $35,000. The per capita income was $32,172. There were 11.1% of families and 10.9% of the population living below the poverty line, including 6.3% of under eighteens and none of those over 64.

== Education ==
Butteville Elementary School is located within Edgewood. The school provides education for pre-K to the 8th grade. Enrollment includes children from Lake Shastina and Weed, and totaled 210 students in fall 2012. Weed High School and College of the Siskiyous are a short distance away.

== Transportation ==
Weed Airport, at exit 753 just off Interstate 5, is located on the northern end of the Edgewood area.
