= Shasta Cascade League =

The Shasta Cascade League is a high school sports league based in Northern California. It serves schools in Modoc, Shasta, Siskiyou, and Trinity Counties, and its athletic teams are members of the Northern Section of the California Interscholastic Federation.

== Current league teams ==
- Etna High School (Lions)
- Fall River High School, McArthur (Bulldogs)
- Modoc High School, Alturas (Braves)
- Mt. Shasta High School (Bears)
- Trinity High School, Weaverville (Wolves)
- Weed High School (Cougars)
- Redding Christian High School (Lions)

=== Former league teams ===
- Hayfork High School (Timberjacks)
- Tulelake High School (Honkers)
- Burney High School (Raiders)
