= Christian Troubadours =

American Southern gospel quartet

The Christian Troubadours
- Also known as: The Troubadours
- Origin: California
- Genres: Christian, Southern gospel
- Years active: 1954 - 1975
- Labels: CT, Sacred, Audiodisc, Sundown, Vision, Leland, Scripture, Hymntone, Heart Warming, Jessup, Heritage
- Members: None
- Past members: Wayne Walters (Bass vocal, guitar); Harvey Yeoman (Lead vocal, mandolin); Bill Carter (Tenor vocal, upright bass, bass guitar); Frank Petty (Lead vocal, fiddle); Phillip Price (Banjo, lead guitar), Jack Boles (Guitar), Larry King (Tenor vocal, upright bass, bass guitar); LeRoy Blankenship (Piano, guitar); Noel Walters (Upright bass, bass guitar); Bruce Watkins (Banjo, lead guitar)
- Website: http://christiantroubadours.com//

The Christian Troubadours, also known as Christian Troubadours, were an American Southern gospel quartet, who performed from the mid-1950s through the mid-1970s.

== History ==
The Christian Troubadours were originally organized in Lakewood, California, by guitar player and bass singer Wayne Walters, a native of Belleville, Arkansas. After the Troubadours formed, Walters also became manager and songwriter for the group. In 1962, upright bass player and tenor singer Bill Carter traveled to California from Eagleton, Arkansas, to join the Troubadours. At this time, the group had relocated in Modesto, California. A year later, Phil Price joined the band to play banjo as well as sing baritone and as a musical arranger. In time, Leroy Blankenship became lead singer in addition to preaching at the revival meetings and services held in conjunction with concerts given by the group. Following the addition of Blankenship to the Troubadours, the group relocated to Nashville, Tennessee. Frank Petty of Weed, California, played the violin and one of the earliest members played mandolin; his name was Harvey Yeoman. Larry King also played bass and sang with the group for a short time.

== Discography ==
- Country Gospel Singing (Sundown Records, master tape at Sun Records Memphis, TN)
- Labor of Love (Vision Records)
- Time For Prayer
- Country Gospel Singing Volume 2
- Love Thy Neighbor
- The Inner Glow
- Gospel In Bluegrass
- I've Got A Song
- This Is Gospel Country (Scripture Records)
- Down Home Gospel (Scripture Records)
- Far East Tour (Hymntone Records)
- Authentic Country Gospel (Hymntone Records)
- Filled With Praise (Heart Warming Records)
- The Nashville Sound
- Extra, Tell The News
- Something For Everybody
- Down To Earth (Heritage Records)
- Versatility (Heritage Records)
- On The Right Track (Jessup Records)
- Now... Hear This! (Heritage Records)
