= Evergreen League =

The Evergreen League is a high school sports league based in Northern California. It serves schools in Lassen, Modoc, Shasta, Siskiyou and Trinity Counties and its athletic teams are members of the Northern Section of the California Interscholastic Federation.

== Current league teams ==
- Big Valley High School, Bieber, California (Cardinals)
- Butte Valley High School, Dorris (Bulldogs)
- Dunsmuir High School (Tigers)
- Hayfork High School (Timberjacks)
- Happy Camp High School (Indians)
- Surprise Valley High School, Cedarville (Hornets)
- Tulelake High School (Honkers)
- McCloud High School (Loggers)

=== Former/inactive league teams ===
- Fall River High School, McArthur (Bulldogs, football only)
- Weed High School (Cougars, football only)
