= Mount Shasta Brewing Company =

Brewery in Weed, California

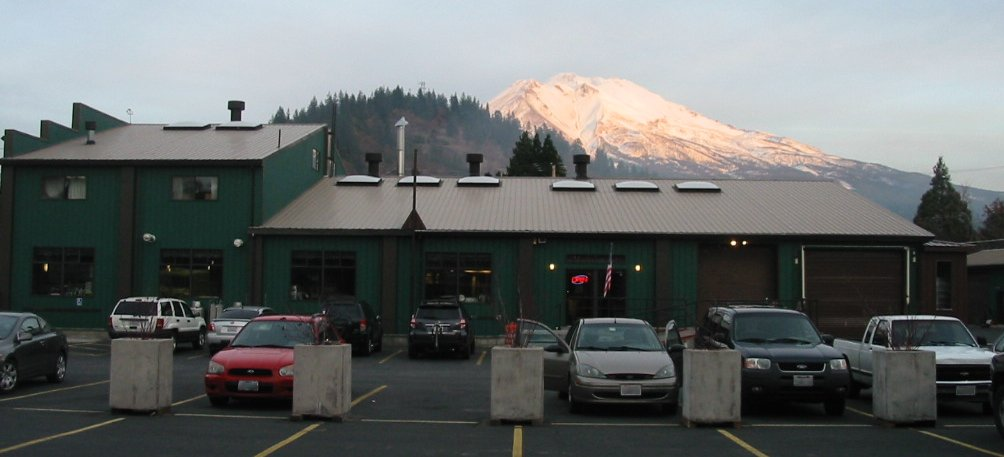
- Mount Shasta stands to the east of the brewery, as seen in 2011
- Location: Weed, California, U.S.
- Opened: 2003
- Key people: Founders: Vaune and Barbara Dillmann
- Owned by: Charles and Anne Kline
- Website: https://www.mountshastabrewingcompany.com

Mount Shasta Brewing Company, also known as Mt. Shasta Brewing Co. and Weed Ales, is a brewery in Weed, California, United States.

Founders Vaune and Barbara Dillmann began commercial production in 2003, and filed licenses to distribute its beers in the states of California, Oregon, and Washington. The brewery has won awards for its beers, for local community involvement and for its marketing success with the slogan "Try Legal Weed".

Charles and Anne Kline bought the brewery in June 2024, added a music stage, and changed the beer list.

== History ==
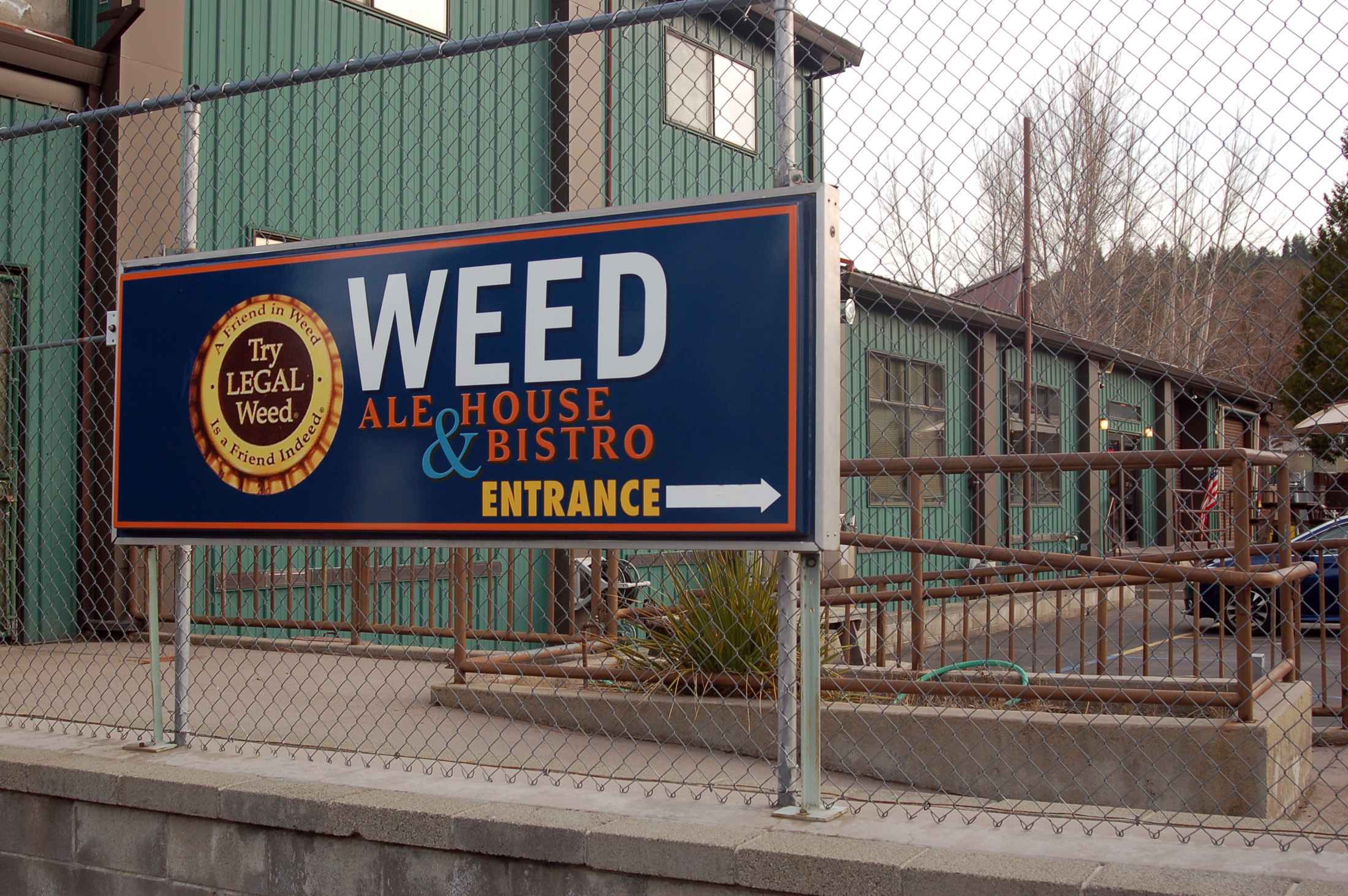
The brewery signage as seen in 2019

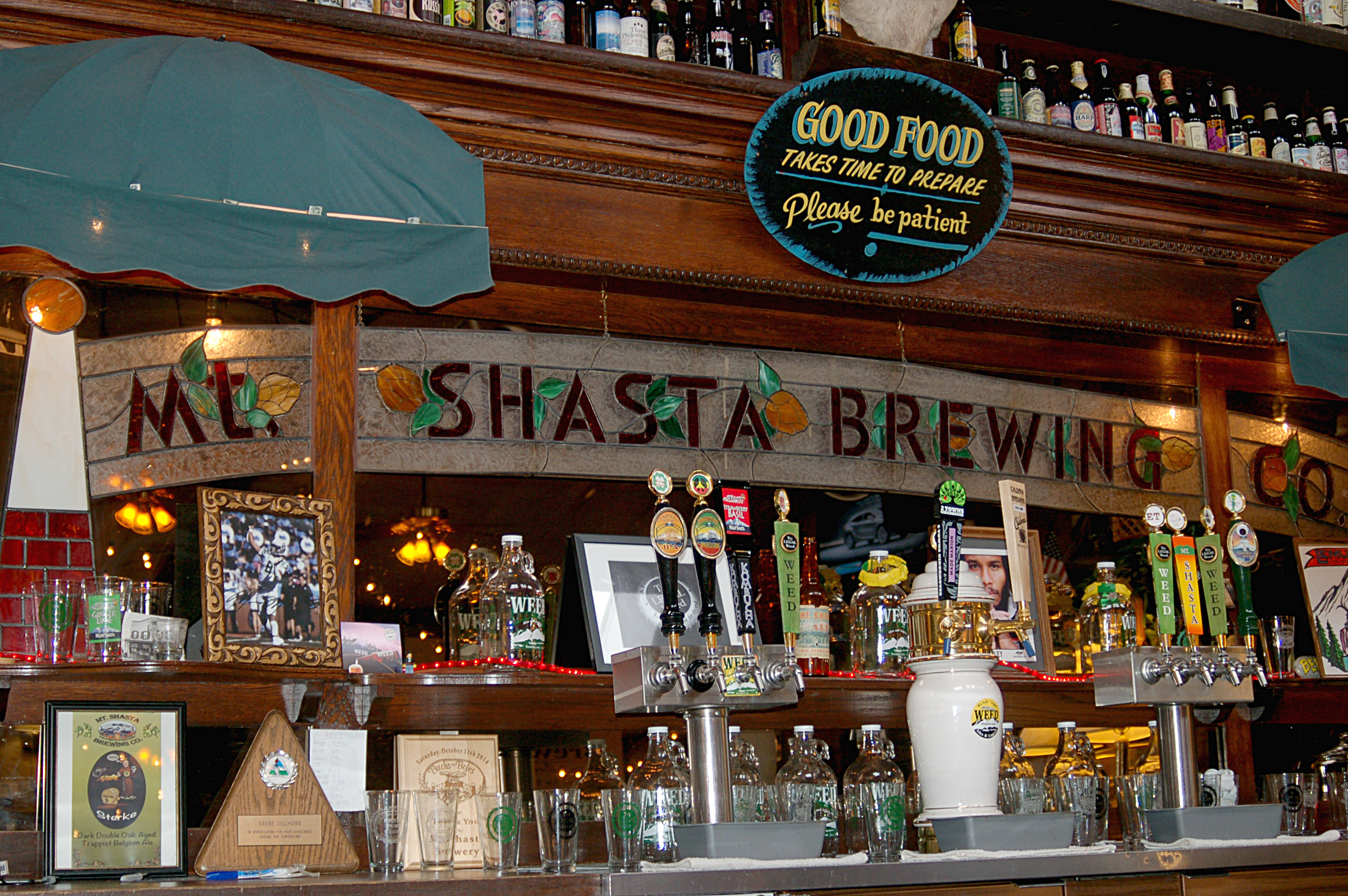
Interior bar in 2019

Oakland Police officer Vaune V. Dillmann left Oakland in 1974 with his new bride, Barbara. The newlyweds settled near Mount Shasta; her family had earlier ties to land in the area. Vaune Dillmann purchased the Black Butte Saloon in central Weed and operated it for 25 years. During this time Dillmann helped sponsor the rebuilding of a large sign welcoming visitors to Weed, the sign arching over the town's main street leading to the saloon. Barbara M. Dillmann served for a time as Siskiyou County Superintendent of Schools.

Dillmann long wished to brew beer in the tradition of his German ancestors who settled in Milwaukee. In 1992, he bought the 18,000-square-foot (1,700 m^{2}) Medo-Bel Creamery building in Weed three days before it was to be auctioned off. In renovating the 1952 building into a brewery, serious gasoline soil contamination was discovered, traced to leaking gasoline tanks and pump facilities used for decades to fuel Medo-Bel's fleet of trucks. Dillmann was granted $995,000 in state funds intended to remove contaminants from underground storage tanks, and the property was finally pronounced clean in May 1999.

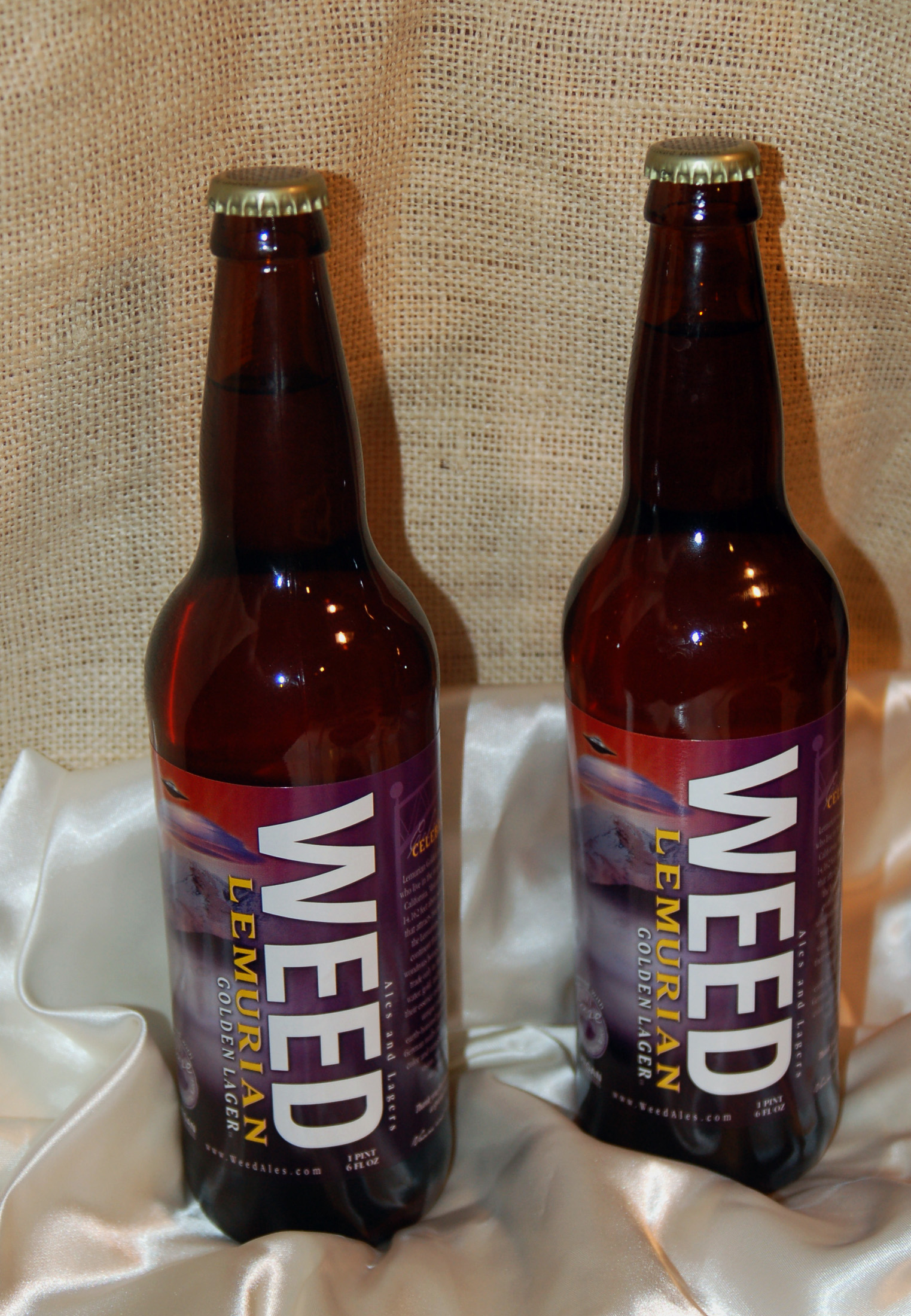
Lemurian Lager bottles in 2019

The building took further improvements before beer could be made. Skylights were cut in the roof and the interior ceiling was clad in insulated plastic. Brewing equipment was brought from St. Paul, Minnesota—a 1938 24-barrel (740 gal, 2,800 L) brew kitchen outgrown by Summit Brewing Company—and from Davis, California, where Dillmann bought a modern 15-barrel (465 gal, 1,755 L) PUB system. The first commercial keg beer was brewed by Mt. Shasta Brewing in 2003: Weed Golden Ale. In 2005, the first batch of bottled beer was produced. In 2007, the brewery's Shastafarian Porter placed first in the Porter category in Sacramento at the California Brewers Festival. The next year at the Festival, the brewery's Mountain High IPA scored top India Pale Ale honors (edging out Bear Republic's highly regarded Racer 5 IPA), and their sour cherry-infused summer seasonal brew, Mt. Shasta Kriek Ale, came in third in the Fruit Beers category. Also in 2009, Mt. Shasta Brewing Company was named "Business of the Year" by the Weed Chamber of Commerce.

In 2003, two months before Mt. Shasta Brewing Company released its first product, Butte Creek Brewery in Chico, California, came out with a brew they patented as Mt. Shasta Pale Ale. Butte Creek sued for control of the trademark of Mt. Shasta Brewing Company, but Dillmann won the suit after a significant effort in proving his claim.

The brewery distributed its bottled beers to retailers and also served beer in its tasting room and restaurant. The tasting room featured an oak bar saved from Rosie's Saloon in nearby Fort Jones. Occasional specialty brews are only available at the tasting room. Being near the College of the Siskiyous was a boost to business, according to Dillmann, as was being near Interstate 5.

In 2011, the brewery was reported as one of three in Siskiyou County, California. The other two were in Dunsmuir and Etna.

=== Change in ownership ===
In May 2022, the brewery hired Charles Kline as a brewer and assistant manager. Charles and Anne Kline bought the company in June 2024, making renovations including adding a stage for live music. The beer list was partially reworked.

=== Slogan controversy ===
Dillmann said he freely used the town's name in his marketing by permission of the descendants of lumber baron Abner Weed, the town's founder and a state senator. The website domain Dillmann used was www.weedales.com, and "Weed Ales" is trademarked. Dillmann says the brewery relied on tourists for 92% of its business, and he used the Weed name in double entendre, playfully, to promote the brand. Some of the company slogans were "Try Legal Weed", "A Friend in Weed Is a Friend Indeed" and "Weed – a flavor yet to be discovered."

Controversial slogans on the company's bottlecaps

The slogan "Try Legal Weed" appeared on the bottle caps of each product in the brewery's line from early 2008. In April 2008, the company was ordered to remove the slogan by the Alcohol and Tobacco Tax and Trade Bureau (ATTTB) because of the perceived endorsement of an illegal drug. The Dillmanns argued that they should be allowed to exercise their freedom of speech, and that the slogan refers to the town of Weed and advertises a legal product. Dillmann said he has never in his life tried marijuana (also known as "weed"). Dillmann was invited to speak about the issue on regional and national television programs, local radio shows, and he was interviewed by reporters from many countries. The American Civil Liberties Union (ACLU) expressed their intention to challenge the ruling on the basis of the First Amendment guaranteeing freedom of speech, but in October 2008 ATTTB reversed their decision after additional review.

Upon hearing the news, Dillmann said, "Weed fought the law, and Weed won." The following year, the Dillmanns were honored by the United States Commerce Association's Best of Local Business Award Program for positive contributions to the local community and their marketing success in the battle to retain the slogan.
