= Paul Keeler =

US rugby union player & coach

- Born: April 17, 1971 (age 55) Queens, New York
- University: Canisius College of Buffalo, New York

Rugby union career
- Position: Hooker
Amateur team(s)
Years	Team	Apps	(Points)
- Canisius College RFC
–	Buffalo Old Boys RFC		
–	Rockaway RFC		
–	Old Blue RFC		
Coaching career
- Years: Team
- 2006–07: Old Blue RFC
- 2007–12: San Francisco Golden Gate
- 2012–: Santa Clara University
- 2016: San Francisco Rush
- Correct as of June 7, 2016

Paul Keeler (born April 17, 1971) is an American rugby union coach and former player. Keeler has coached Old Blue RFC, San Francisco Golden Gate, and Santa Clara University. In 2016, Keeler was the head coach of PRO Rugby team San Francisco Rush.

== Playing career ==
Keeler began playing rugby for Canisius College in Buffalo, New York, before moving on to play with the Buffalo Old Boys RFC and Rockaway RFC men's clubs. Keeler moved on to play with Old Blue RFC of the Rugby Super League, reaching the playoffs four times including two RSL semifinals. Keeler was also a MetNY and NERFU select player during this period.

== Coaching ==
=== Club ===
Keeler moved into coaching as a player/coach and was assistant coach to the Australian coach Geoff Mould of Australian schoolboys fame. From 2003 through 2005 Keeler coached Old Blue's Division One side, securing consecutive playoff appearances. Keeler's rep side coaching experiences include being the MetNY select side coach since 2004, and the unbeaten Northeast Select Developmental XV known as The Beagles since 2005.

Keeler coached the Old Blue (New York) Super League side in 2006 and 2007. He guided them to the Super League semifinals in 2006, leading the club to re-sign him to a two-year contract. Keeler led the team to the RSL quarterfinals in 2007.

Keeler served as the director of rugby and head coach of San Francisco Golden Gate RFC from 2008 to 2012. During those five years, Keeler led SFGG to a 32–9 record in the Rugby Super League, including a 7–3 record in the playoffs and two national championships. In In 2008 he led SFGG to a playoff berth, losing a close match in the quarterfinals to eventual champions the New York Athletic Club. In 2009, with Keeler and the aid of assistant coaches and long time club stalwarts Grant Wells and Karl Thomson, the San Francisco club continued their winning ways with a 6–1 record, losing only to rival Belmont Shore. In the playoffs, the club routed the Dallas Harlequins in the quarterfinals, notched an injury-time win over the Denver Barbarians in the semifinals, and won its first championship by defeating Life 23–13 in the RSL final. In 2010, SFGG returned to the final but lost to NYAC. In 2011, SFGG reached the finals for the third consecutive year, this time defeating Life for the championship.

=== College ===
Keeler became the head coach of the Santa Clara University rugby team in 2012. In his first season as head coach, the Broncos posted a 6–1 record in the Northern California Conference of Division 1-AA. As league champions, they earned a berth to the D-1AA playoffs, a program first. Santa Clara accepted an invitation to Division 1-A, joining the California Conference for the 2012–13 season.

=== PRO Rugby ===
In December 2016, Keeler was announced as the head coach for San Francisco Rush in PRO Rugby.

=== National ===
Keeler applied for the vacant head coach position of the United States national rugby union team in 2012, but the post was given to Mike Tolkin.

== College coaching record ==
Year	Team	Overall	Conference	Standing
Santa Clara Broncos (California Conference) (2012–2015)
2012	Santa Clara	7–4	6–1	1st
2013	Santa Clara	6–6	2–5	4th
2014	Santa Clara	7–1	5–1	T-1st
2015	Santa Clara	4–7	1–3	
Total:		24–18		
National championship Conference title Conference division title or championship game berth
^{#}Rankings from final Coaches Poll.; ^{°}Rankings from final AP Poll.
