= California Conference =

California Conference is one of the three conferences of the CIF Northern Section, a high school athletics governing body part of the California Interscholastic Federation. The conference is divided into several leagues.

== Member Schools ==
- American Christian High School
- Big Valley High School
- Butte Valley High School
- Champion Christian High School
- Core Butte High School
- Downieville High School
- Dunsmuir High School
- Elk Creek High School
- Golden Eagle Charter High School
- Greenville Junior Senior High School
- Happy Camp High School
- Hayfork High School
- Herlong High School
- Loyalton High School
- Westwood High School
- Paradise Adventist High School
- Providence Christian High School
- Surprise Valley High School
- Tulelake High School
- Plumas Christian High School
- Princeton Junior Senior High School
