= Jason Sehorn =

American football player (born 1971)

No. 31, 42
- Position: Cornerback

Personal information
- Born: April 15, 1971 (age 55); Sacramento, California, U.S.
- Listed height: 6 ft 2 in (1.88 m)
- Listed weight: 213 lb (97 kg)

Career information
- High school: Mt. Shasta (Mount Shasta, California)
- College: Shasta (1990–1991); USC (1992–1993)
- NFL draft: 1994: 2nd round, 59th overall pick

Career history
- New York Giants (1994–2002); St. Louis Rams (2003)

Awards and highlights
- NFL forced fumbles co-leader (1996); 89th greatest New York Giant of all-time

Career NFL statistics
- Tackles: 443
- Interceptions: 19
- Touchdowns: 5
- Stats at Pro Football Reference

Jason Heath Sehorn (born April 15, 1971) is an American former professional football player who was a cornerback in the National Football League (NFL) for the New York Giants from 1994 to 2002 and St. Louis Rams in 2003. He played college football for the USC Trojans.

== Early life ==
Sehorn was born in Sacramento, California. He played only one year of high school football at Mount Shasta High School in Mount Shasta, California.

Sehorn was signed by the Chicago Cubs after just one season of playing American Legion Baseball following his senior year of high school. An outfielder, Sehorn failed to produce as a hitter, batting just .184 in 49 games in 1990 for the rookie league Huntington Cubs. Sehorn would then turn his focus to playing football.

== College career ==
Sehorn played his first two years of college football at Shasta College, a junior college in Redding, California, where he was a standout wide receiver, kick returner and punt returner. He then played two years at the University of Southern California, where he was moved to defense, playing safety and cornerback.

== Professional career ==
Pre-draft measurables
Height	Weight	Arm length	Hand span	40-yard dash	10-yard split	20-yard split	20-yard shuttle	Vertical jump
6 ft 1 3/4 in (1.87 m)	218 lb (99 kg)	31 in (0.79 m)	9 5/8 in (0.24 m)	4.37 s	1.61 s	2.66 s	4.25 s	35.0 in (0.89 m)
All values from NFL Combine

Sehorn was drafted in the second round of the 1994 NFL draft by the New York Giants with the 59th overall pick. He spent most of his career playing cornerback for them.

After back-to-back successful seasons in 1996–97, Sehorn suffered a debilitating knee injury, tearing his anterior cruciate (ACL) and medial collateral ligaments (MCL) while returning the opening kickoff in a 1998 preseason game against the New York Jets. Though Sehorn returned the next season, his speed was diminished. Still, he started 73 games for the Giants at cornerback in six seasons played from 1996 to 2002. He represented the Giants in Super Bowl XXXV.

The Giants released Sehorn on March 7, 2003, and in May of that year, he signed with the St. Louis Rams as a safety. He missed the first six games of the season with a broken foot, but played in the last ten. The next year, his contract with the Rams was terminated after he failed a physical examination before the start of the 2004 season.

== NFL career statistics ==
Legend
	Led the league
**Bold**	Career high

=== Regular season ===
Year	Team	Games		Tackles				Interceptions				Fumbles			
Year	Team	GP	GS	Comb	Solo	Ast	Sck	Int	Yds	TD	Lng	FF	FR	Yds	TD
1994	NYG	8	0	1	1	0	0.0	0	0	0	0	0	0	0	0
1995	NYG	14	0	6	4	2	0.0	0	0	0	0	1	0	0	0
1996	NYG	16	15	**97**	**83**	**14**	**3.0**	5	61	**1**	24	**5**	**1**	0	0
1997	NYG	16	16	86	75	11	1.5	**6**	**74**	**1**	**41**	2	**1**	2	0
1999	NYG	10	10	45	35	10	0.0	1	-4	0	-4	0	0	0	0
2000	NYG	14	14	73	60	13	0.0	2	32	0	32	1	**1**	8	0
2001	NYG	13	13	63	57	6	1.0	3	34	**1**	34	1	**1**	**35**	0
2002	NYG	16	5	47	43	4	0.0	2	31	**1**	31	0	0	0	0
2003	STL	10	3	25	19	6	0.0	0	0	0	0	0	0	0	0
		117	76	443	377	66	5.5	19	228	4	41	10	4	45	0

=== Playoffs ===
Year	Team	Games		Tackles				Interceptions				Fumbles			
Year	Team	GP	GS	Comb	Solo	Ast	Sck	Int	Yds	TD	Lng	FF	FR	Yds	TD
1997	NYG	1	1	4	4	0	0.0	1	**36**	0	**36**	0	0	0	0
2000	NYG	3	3	**12**	**12**	0	0.0	**2**	32	**1**	32	0	0	0	0
2002	NYG	1	1	1	1	0	0.0	1	0	0	0	0	0	0	0
2003	STL	1	1	4	4	0	0.0	0	0	0	0	0	0	0	0
		6	6	21	21	0	0.0	4	68	1	36	0	0	0	0

== In media ==
Sehorn participated in ABC's Superstars competition during the NFL offseason. As a testament to his athleticism, he won the competition three consecutive years from 1998 to 2000.

In 2005, Sehorn joined Fox Sports Net, where he was a panelist on their Sunday NFL pregame show.

Sehorn is also a college football analyst for ESPNU. He joined the network in 2011 as the in-studio analyst for Thursday and Saturday night games on ESPNU.

Sehorn is now the Director of Communications at the Hendrick Automotive Group in Charlotte, North Carolina, an automotive retailer in the United States.

== Personal life ==
Sehorn was briefly married to former CNN correspondent Whitney Casey from February 14, 1998, until their divorce in 1999. His marriage to actress Angie Harmon is well known due to his public proposal. During one of Harmon's appearances on The Tonight Show with Jay Leno, Sehorn (with the assistance of host Jay Leno) surprised Harmon by coming out, getting down on one knee in front of a live studio audience and millions more watching. Not only did he surprise her with the proposal, he also flew her father Larry there so he could properly ask him for her hand in marriage. They were married on June 9, 2001. They have three daughters: Finley, born October 14, 2003; Avery, born June 22, 2005; and Emery, born December 18, 2008. Both publicly support the Republican Party. The couple announced in November 2014 that they were separating after 13 years of marriage, and divorced in December 2015. Sehorn remarried, to fire equipment heiress Meghann Gunderman, in 2017. They have a daughter named Sage.

On January 19, 1999, Sehorn's high school jersey #1 was retired by his alma mater, Mt. Shasta High School, in a ceremony hosted by his longtime friend, mentor, and former coach, Joe Blevins. The ceremony aired on local cable television.
