= Summit Brewing Company =

Regional craft brewery in Saint Paul, Minnesota

Coordinates: 44°54′50″N 93°8′22″W

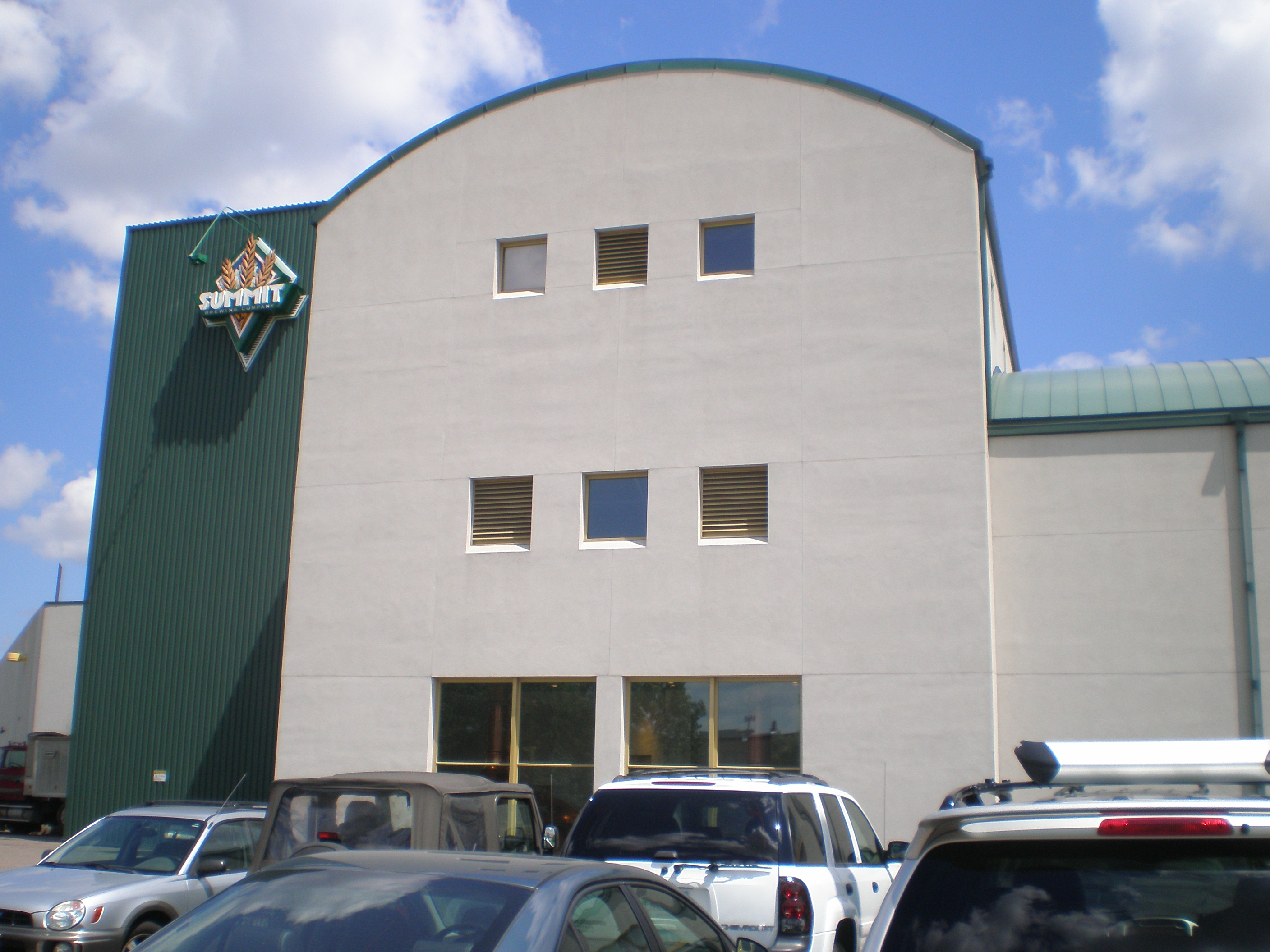
- The Summit Brewery in Saint Paul, Minnesota
- Location: St. Paul, Minnesota; United States
- Opened: 1986
- Annual production volume: 115,000 US beer barrels (135,000 hL) in 2017

Active beers
Name	Type
Summit Extra Pale Ale	English Pale Ale
Summit Dakota Soul	Pilsener
Summit Twins Pils	German Pilsner
Summit Great Northern Porter	American Porter
Summit Oatmeal Stout	Nitro Oatmeal Stout
Summit Saga IPA	American IPA

Seasonal beers
Name	Type
Summit Maibock (Spring)	Maibock / helles bock
Summit Summer Ale (Summer)	German-style Kölsch
Summit Oktoberfest (Fall)	Märzen
Summit Winter Ale (Winter)	Winter warmer
Summit Slugfest Juicy IPA	American IPA
Summit Cabin Crusher Kölsch with Lime	German-style Kölsch
Summit Cranky Woodsman Nut Brown Ale	Brown Ale
Summit Dark Infusion Coffee Milk Stout	Milk Stout

Other beers
Name	Type
Summit Beer Hall Exclusives (New styles released periodically)	varied
Summit Union Series	varied

Summit Brewing Company is a regional craft brewery in Saint Paul, Minnesota, United States, that brews a wide selection of beers. In 2017, Summit Brewing was the 25th largest craft brewer in the country and produced approximately 115,000 barrels of beer, with a capacity of 240,000 barrels per year. Their flagship beer has been an English Pale Ale branded as Summit Extra Pale Ale.

The brewery was founded in 1986 by local homebrewer Mark Stutrud and a group of his friends in an old auto parts warehouse on St. Paul's University Avenue. The company grew as the beers became popular locally. In 1987, the Great Northern Porter won a gold medal at the Great American Beer Festival and was featured on the cover of Michael Jackson's New World Guide to Beer (1988). By 1998 the company's beer production had exceeded the capacity of the original University Avenue brewery, and a new brewery, designed by architect Peter O'Brien, was built on the west end of St. Paul, overlooking the Mississippi River. Still in operation, it was the first new brewery built from the ground up in St. Paul since before Prohibition. Having outgrown its original brewing equipment, Summit sold its 1938-vintage brew house to Mt. Shasta Brewing Company in Northern California. They then purchased an all-copper, authentic German brew house built in 1971 from the Hürnerbräu Brewery in Ansbach Germany.

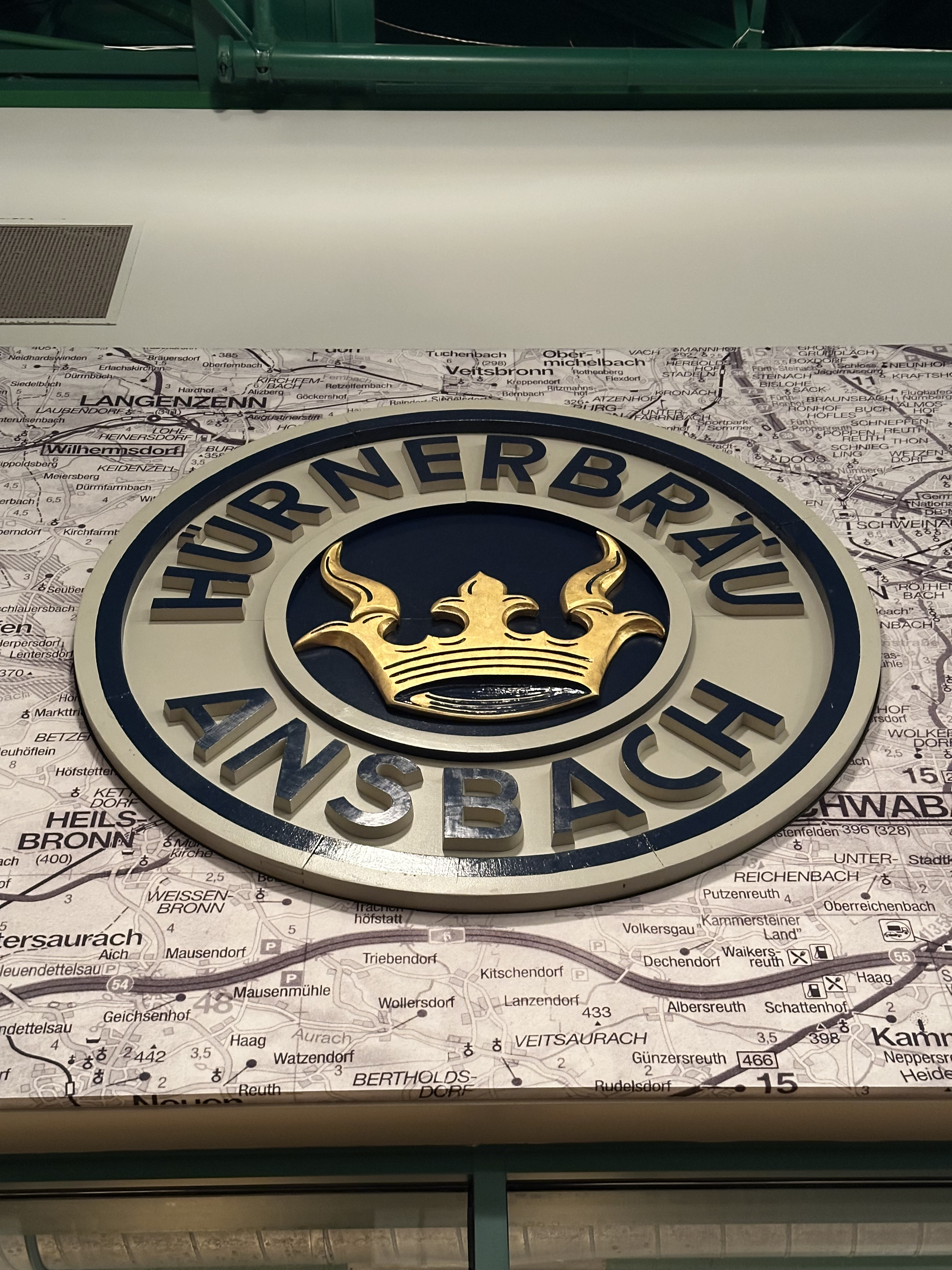
Hürnerbrau Ansbach logo at Summit Brewing Company as of December 2024

As of 2017, Summit beers are available from distributors in five U.S. states (Iowa, Minnesota, North Dakota, South Dakota, and Wisconsin). The brewery currently brews seven year-round styles, a variety of seasonal styles, and limited release beers. 2018 saw the launch of new year-round beers such as Summit Dakota Soul, a traditional Czech-style Pilsener; Summit Skip Rock, a white ale; and Summit Keller Pils, an award-winning, unfiltered German-style Pilsner.

In July 2018, Summit Brewing Company completed a renovation of the Summit Ratskeller, its public bar and patio area in St. Paul. The Summit Ratskeller features Summit's entire lineup of beers, plus exclusive beers served only on site. The Rathskeller also provides access to the Summit Brewing Co. Gift Shop as well as tours of the brewery.

As of 2018, Summit Brewing Company remains the second-largest brewery in Minnesota, after August Schell Brewing Company.

Summit reached an agreement with the Minnesota Twins baseball team in 2021, renaming their Keller Pils to Twins Pils. The distinctive Minnesota Twins bat-shaped tap handles are made by Pillbox Bat Company in Winona, Minnesota.

In 2023, Mark Stutrud announced that he was retiring as CEO of Summit Brewing Company after 37 years. He was replaced by Summit's former Chief Strategy Officer, Brandon Bland.

In September 2026, BMO Bank initiated foreclosure proceedings against Summit Brewing Company after the brewery defaulted on $8.2 million in loans taken out in 2024.
