= Mario Pastega =

American businessman

Mario Pastega (1916–2012) was an American businessman. A soft-drink bottler in the state of Oregon for nearly six decades, Pastega was elected to the Beverage World Hall of Fame in 2002. Pastega is best remembered as a patron of education and as the funder and namesake of the Mario Pastega House, a hostel in Corvallis, Oregon offering low cost or free accommodations to families of hospitalized patients in that town.

== Biography ==
=== Early years ===
Mario Pastega was born 12 December 1916 in Weed, California. He was the son of a cobbler named Romano Pastega and his wife, the former Giuseppina Cunial, who worked as a maid. His parents emigrated from a town in the Italian Alps to the United States in 1907, eventually making their way west to open up a shoe repair shop in Weed. Mario worked for his father in the shoe repair store from the age of 12.

Pastega grew up in the home speaking Italian as his first language, learning English only after being enrolled in school in Weed. Pastega was raised a Roman Catholic and remained an active member of the Catholic Church throughout his life.

Pastega trained as a legal transcriptionist, working variously as a court clerk and court reporter, taking trial transcriptions.

Pastega married the former Alma Solari (1917–2008) in April 1938. Together the couple raised five children. The couple's three sons each followed their father into the soda bottling business, each managing one of the company's three plants.

=== Career ===
In 1948 Pastega began his ultimate career path when he purchased a half share in the Pepsi-Cola bottling plant of Klamath Falls, Oregon from his wife's brother. The Pastega family remained in that Southern Oregon town until 1961, when the family's bottling empire was expanded through purchase of the Pepsi-Cola bottling plant in Corvallis, Oregon. Pastega and his family subsequently moved to Corvallis to manage that facility.

Pastega subsequently sold his share of the Klamath Falls bottling operation and used the proceeds to purchase additional Pepsi bottling plants in the Oregon towns of Tillamook and Medford.

In the early 1980s, Pastega launched a new business, the Mount Angel Beverage Company, in Mount Angel, Oregon.

Over the course of his life Pastega personally met every president in the history of the Pepsi-Cola Company. In December 2010 Pepsi CEO Donald M. Kendall flew to Oregon to attend Pastega's 94th birthday celebration.

In 2002 Pastega was honored by election to membership in the Beverage World Hall of Fame for his career efforts in the soft drink bottling industry.

=== Philanthropic efforts ===
Beginning in 1980 Pastega turned the Corvallis Pepsi bottling plant into a community landmark each winter through its extravagant decoration with Christmas lights. The display, which included a number of mechanized characters, was created by Ole Brensdal, a career employee at Pastega's Corvallis facility. The display has been an annual tradition for over three decades, save for one year when the plant was closed for construction.

Although Pastega sold the bottling company in the spring of 2011 to the Pepsi Beverages Co. of Westchester County, New York, continuation of the now-traditional Christmas display which Pastega launched was preserved. "That's part of the contract – thou shalt keep it open every year. That's a guarantee," Pastega said at the time of sale.

Pastega became a trustee of the Good Samaritan Hospital Foundation in 1981. In this capacity he headed several seven-figure fundraising drives for hospital expansion projects.

In 2004 Pastega became the major benefactor and chief fundraiser for the Mario Pastega House, an endowed 12-room guest hostel for out-of-town family members of patients receiving treatment at Good Samaritan Hospital. In addition to the rooms, 3 full service RV hook ups are available. Those needing use of the facility may stay at it for $20 per night, a fee waived for those in financial need. During the facility's first five years of operations it provided accommodations equivalent to 26,164 motel rooms. In addition to his leading role in ongoing fundraising campaigns on behalf of the project, Pastega and his wife personally gave between $500,000 and $600,000 to the project over the years.

Pastega was also a trustee of the Oregon State University Foundation as well as a founding trustee of the Corvallis Public Schools Foundation, established in 1996. As a donor he endowed the Golden Apple Awards, presented each year to three of the Corvallis School District's teachers and one member of the district's staff.

Pastega and his late wife Alma also created and endowed the Mario and Alma Pastega Awards, awards for exceptional scholarship granted each year to two deserving members of the faculty of Western Oregon University in Monmouth, Oregon.

Pastega also sponsored a student award program for students at Mount Angel Abbey.

=== Death and legacy ===
Mario Pastega died 20 January 2012 at Overlake Hospital in Bellevue, Washington following a month-long battle with pneumonia.

Pastega's philanthropic efforts were recognized in 2004 when Pastega received the Oregon Philanthropy Award and in 2009 when he received the Oregon Ethics in Business Award.

Pastega was remembered by Oregon State University President Ed Ray as a "tremendous friend of the university" who together with his wife served "as shining examples of what it means to live with respect and kindness for all."
