= McCloud High School =

Location
- 133 Campus Way; McCloud, Siskiyou County, California 96057; United States; 41.2542°N 122.13478°W

Information
- Type: Public
- School district: Siskiyou Union High School District
- Superintendent: Michael Wharton Jr.
- Principal: Yolanda Alves
- Teaching staff: 2.58 (FTE)
- Grades: 9-12
- Enrollment: 8 (2023-2024)
- Student to teacher ratio: 3.10
- Colors: Purple and Gold
- Athletics conference: CIF Northern Section Evergreen League
- Mascot: Logger
- Rival: Dunsmuir High School
- Newspaper: Mount Shasta Herald
- Website: http://www.mccloud-highschool.com

McCloud High School is a public high school located in McCloud, California. It is a member of the Siskiyou Union High School District. The school's mascot is known as the "Loggers".

== Athletics ==
The McCloud Loggers are members of the Evergreen League (except for football, which are members of the NorCal 8-Man Football League). The Loggers athletic programs have won numerous league titles between 1952 and 2000 and have won several Northern Section CIF championships until 2001. Most notably, the 1986 varsity boys basketball team, led by senior Joel DeBortoli, who won the school's only Division III title. They were one game away from a trip to the state championship, but lost to Vanden High School at the original ARCO Arena in Sacramento. It was the team's only loss that year.

The last team championship was the NSCIF Division VI softball title in 2001. The last individual championship was won in track and field by Andrew (Kruk) Mero in 2002.

Football games are played at Charles R. Green Athletic Complex, named for former principal Charles R. Green. Basketball and volleyball games were played in the Douglas M. DeBortoli Gymnasium, named for the former principal of the school and former SUHSD superintendent who died in 1994.

There were no athletics from 2003 until 2018. However, the school announced that football, volleyball and basketball would return starting in the fall of 2018.

=== Retired numbers ===
- #15 - Fawn Huckaba (basketball, died in 1995)

== Notable alumni ==
- Rolin Eslinger - 3-time World Champion Lumberjack from the Stihl Timbersports Series
