= Jefferson High School (Mt. Shasta, California) =

Location
- 720 Rockfellow Drive; Mount Shasta, Siskiyou County, California 96067; United States
- Coordinates: 41.32010°N 122.30321°W

Information
- Type: Continuation
- School district: Siskiyou Union High School District
- Superintendent: Michael Wharton Jr.
- Principal: Ed Stokes
- Grades: 9-12
- Enrollment: 23 (2016-17)
- Colors: Red and black
- Mascot: Panther
- Newspaper: Mount Shasta Herald
- Website: www.jeffersoncontinuation.com

Jefferson High School is a continuation high school located in Mt. Shasta, California. It is a member of the Siskiyou Union High School District.
