= Aaron Thomas (American football) =

American football player (1937–2024)

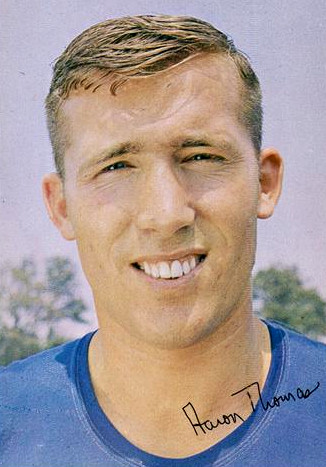
- Thomas in 1965

No. 89, 88
- Position: Tight end

Personal information
- Born: November 7, 1937; Dierks, Arkansas, U.S.
- Died: April 26, 2024 (aged 86); Corvallis, Oregon, U.S.
- Listed height: 6 ft 3 in (1.91 m)
- Listed weight: 210 lb (95 kg)

Career information
- High school: Weed
- College: Oregon State
- NFL draft: 1961: 4th round, 47th overall pick
- AFL draft: 1961: 16th round, 126th overall pick

Career history
- San Francisco 49ers (1961–1962); New York Giants (1962–1970)

Awards and highlights
- Pro Bowl (1964); 90th greatest New York Giant of all-time

Career NFL statistics
- Receptions: 262
- Receiving yards: 4,554
- Receiving touchdowns: 37
- Stats at Pro Football Reference

Aaron Norman Thomas (November 7, 1937 – April 26, 2024) was an American professional football player who was a tight end in the National Football League (NFL) for the San Francisco 49ers and New York Giants from 1961 to 1970. He played college football for the Oregon State Beavers.

== Early life ==
Thomas was born in Dierks, Arkansas, but moved in 1948 to Weed, California, where he played high school football. He graduated from Weed High School in 1957. Thomas was inducted into the school's inaugural Athletic Hall of Fame in 2008.

== College career ==
Thomas chose to continue his football career in college just up Interstate 5 for the Oregon State Beavers. Thomas played receiver at OSU from 1958-1960. He played in the East-West Shrine Game following his junior season, and the College All-Star Game, Coaches All-America Bowl, and the Senior Bowl following the 1960 season.

== Professional career ==
Upon his completion at Oregon State, Thomas was not only selected in the fourth round (47th overall) of the 1961 NFL draft by the San Francisco 49ers, but was also selected in the 16th round of the 1961 AFL draft by the Dallas Texans. He chose to play for the 49ers, where he played wide receiver. During the 1962 NFL season, after two games with the 49ers, Thomas was traded to the New York Giants where he played tight end for the remainder of his career until retirement in 1970. While with the Giants, Thomas was selected to the Pro Bowl following the 1964 season. In his 11-year career, Thomas only missed seven games.

== NFL career statistics ==
Legend
	Led the league
**Bold**	Career high

=== Regular season ===
Year	Team	Games		Receiving				
Year	Team	GP	GS	Rec	Yds	Avg	Lng	TD
1961	SFO	14	8	15	301	20.1	70	2
1962	SFO	2	0	0	0	0.0	0	0
1962	NYG	12	5	4	80	20.0	37	0
1963	NYG	14	5	22	469	21.3	55	3
1964	NYG	14	10	43	624	14.5	42	6
1965	NYG	13	11	27	631	**23.4**	**71**	5
1966	NYG	14	13	43	683	15.9	50	4
1967	NYG	14	13	**51**	**877**	17.2	48	**9**
1968	NYG	12	11	29	449	15.5	49	4
1969	NYG	10	10	22	348	15.8	37	3
1970	NYG	14	1	6	92	15.3	29	1
Career		133	87	262	4,554	17.4	71	37

=== Playoffs ===
Year	Team	Games		Receiving				
Year	Team	GP	GS	Rec	Yds	Avg	Lng	TD
1962	NYG	1	0	0	0	0.0	0	0
1963	NYG	1	0	**2**	**46**	**23.0**	**36**	0
Career		2	0	2	46	23.0	36	0

== Personal life and death ==
Thomas' son, Robb Thomas, followed in his father's path and played football at Oregon State before moving on to play wide receiver in the NFL for 10 seasons. Thomas died in Corvallis, Oregon on April 26, 2024, at the age of 86.
