= Weed, California =

City in California, United States

- City
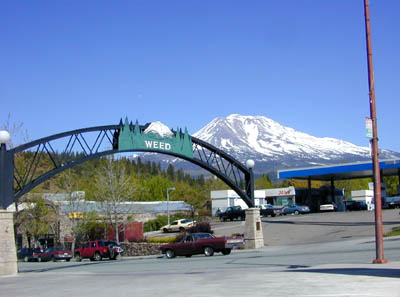
- Entrance to Weed in 2004, with Mount Shasta in the background
- Interactive map of Weed, California
- Location in the contiguous United States
- Coordinates: 41°25′27″N 122°23′4″W
- Country: United States
- State: California
- County: Siskiyou
- Incorporated: January 25, 1961

Government
  - Mayor: Darrell Parham
  - Mayor Pro Tem: Ken Palfini

Area
  - Total: 4.82 sq mi (12.49 km^{2})
  - Land: 4.82 sq mi (12.48 km^{2})
  - Water: 0.0039 sq mi (0.01 km^{2}) 0.11%
- Elevation: 3,425 ft (1,044 m)

Population (2020)
  - Total: 2,862
  - Density: 594.0/sq mi (229.3/km^{2})
- Time zone: UTC-8 (Pacific (PST))
  - Summer (DST): UTC-7 (PDT)
- ZIP Code: 96094
- Area code: 530
- FIPS code: 06-83850
- GNIS feature ID: 1652650
- Website: www.ci.weed.ca.us

Weed is a city in Siskiyou County, California, United States. As of the 2020 Census, the city had a total population of 2,862, down from 2,967 in 2010. There are several unincorporated communities adjacent to, or just outside of Weed, including Edgewood, Carrick, and Lake Shastina. These communities generally have mailing addresses that use Weed or its ZIP Code. Weed is about 10 miles (16 km) northwest of Mount Shasta, a prominent northern California landmark, and the second tallest volcano in the Cascade Range.

Weed's city motto is "Weed like to welcome you". Weed has frequently been noted on lists of unusual place names.

== History ==
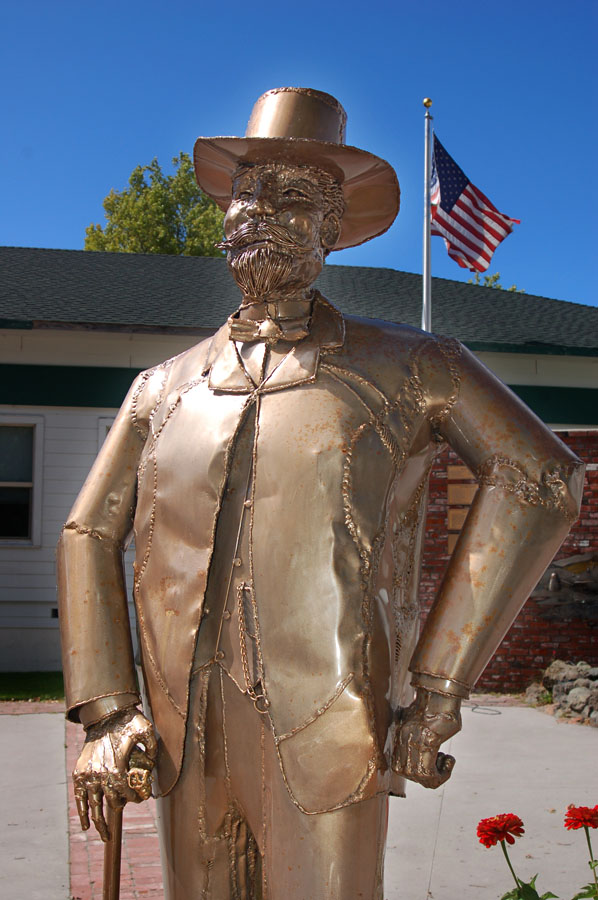
Statue of Abner Weed, founder and namesake of the city

The city of Weed derives its name from the founder of the local lumber mill and pioneer Abner Weed, who discovered that the area's strong winds were helpful in drying lumber. In 1897, Abner Weed bought the Siskiyou Lumber and Mercantile Mill and 280 acres (110 hectares) of land in what is now the city of Weed, for $400.

=== Boles Fire ===
On September 15, 2014, the Boles Fire spread through Weed, driven by 40-mph winds. The fire started behind the Boles Creek Apartments in the central part of Weed at approximately 1:30 p.m., and within four hours quickly spread to over 200 acres (80 hectares). Evacuations were immediately ordered, and a shelter was first set up at College of the Siskiyous, but as fire headed towards the college, the evacuation center was relocated first to the Siskiyou Golden Fairgrounds in Yreka, then to Yreka and Mount Shasta High Schools, then to the armory in Mt. Shasta.

Over 200 structures were damaged or destroyed, including two churches, the elementary school, high school, and Roseburg mill. The schools and mill sustained only minimal damage to outbuildings. About 7,678 Pacific Power customers in both Weed and Mt. Shasta lost power as a result of the fire.

=== Beaughan Spring ===
The city of Weed gets its water from the Beaughan Spring, with the water being piped directly to homes.

In September 2016, The New York Times reported that French billionaire Pierre Papillaud demanded that Weed give up its Beaughan Spring spring water source so that Papillaud's bottle water company could have more water to sell. Disconnecting from Beaughan Spring would leave Weed without public water. In March 2021, it was reported that the parties involved had reached a compromise which will allow Weed to continue to have access to water from Beaughan Spring in perpetuity.

=== Mill Fire ===
In early September 2022, the Mill Fire started in or near Weed, burning down the Lincoln Heights neighborhood.

== Geography ==
Weed is off Interstate 5, 49 miles (79 km) south of the California–Oregon border. The next large settlement to the north on I-5 is Yreka; to the south is the city of Mount Shasta. U.S. Route 97 runs to the northeast and Klamath Falls, Oregon.

According to the United States Census Bureau, the city has a total area of 4.8 square miles (12 km^{2}), of which 0.11% is water. The closest cities with a population greater than 50,000 are Redding (69 miles south) and Medford, Oregon (91 miles north).

=== Climate ===
Weed has a warm-summer Mediterranean climate (Csb according to the Köppen climate classification system), featuring cool, wet winters with occasional snowfall, and hot, dry summers. Its average annual precipitation is 23.64 in (600 mm). Its USDA hardiness zone is 7b.

Weed (1971–2000 normals)

Climate chart (precipitation, max. and min. temperature)
J	F	M	A	M	J	J	A	S	O	N	D
3.7 44 24	3.3 49 28	3.5 54 30	1.9 60 33	1.4 68 38	0.8 77 44	0.3 85 48	0.4 85 48	0.5 78 41	1.4 66 34	3.1 51 29	3.7 44 25
- █ Average max. and min. temperatures in °F
- █ Precipitation totals in inches
- Source: Western Regional Climate Center
Metric conversion
J	F	M	A	M	J	J	A	S	O	N	D
93 7 −5	84 9 −2	90 12 −1	48 16 1	35 20 3	21 25 7	8.1 29 9	11 29 9	12 25 5	35 19 1	79 10 −2	93 6 −4
- █ Average max. and min. temperatures in °C
- █ Precipitation totals in mm

== Transportation ==
Weed is at the intersection of Interstate 5 and U.S. Route 97. Interstate 5 is the primary north–south transportation corridor for the west coast of the United States running from the Mexico–US border to the Canada–US border. U.S. Route 97 is a major north-south U.S. highway continuing from Weed in a northeasterly direction toward Klamath Falls, Oregon, thence through Oregon and Washington to the Canada–US border. California State Route 265 also runs through the city of Weed, locally known as North Weed Boulevard. Only two blocks long, it is the second-shortest state highway in California.

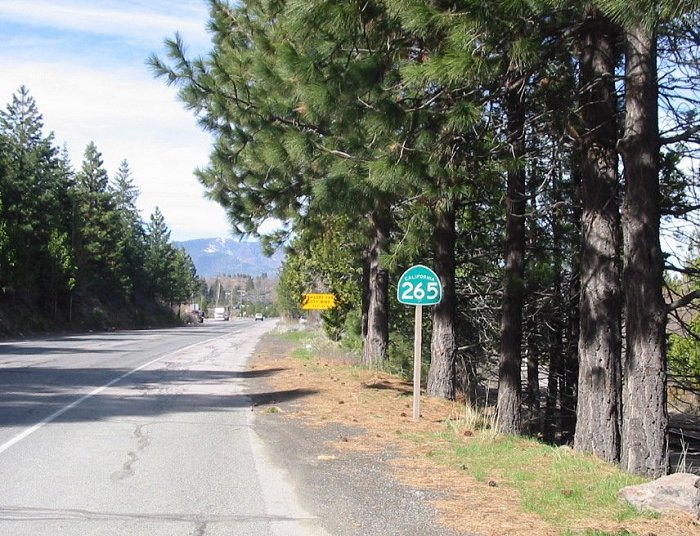
Route 265

Weed is served by Siskiyou County's public transportation bus lines, Siskiyou Transit and General Express, commonly called "The STAGE".

The closest airports for commercial air travel are Rogue Valley International-Medford Airport and Redding Municipal Airport. The Weed Airport serves general aviation and as a base of operations for search and rescue operations on Mount Shasta. Corporate visitors or geological researchers typically use this facility.

Amtrak trains pass through Weed, but do not stop there. The Amtrak bus/shuttle has one stop in South Weed. The nearest depot for Amtrak train travel is in Dunsmuir, approximately 15 miles (24 km) to the south.

Greyhound Bus Lines has a bus station, with both north and southbound buses making stops.

== Economy ==
From its founding in 1901, to as late as the 1980s, Weed was home to a thriving lumber industry. Roseburg Forest Products (plywood), International Paper Company, Morgan Products Ltd. (wooden door manufacturing), and J.H. Baxter (wood treatment) were all based in Weed. The historic industrial area at the northeast corner of Weed has been plagued with environmental concerns and clean-up efforts as a result of chemicals used for wood treatment, as well as chemical residue from glue used in the door factory.

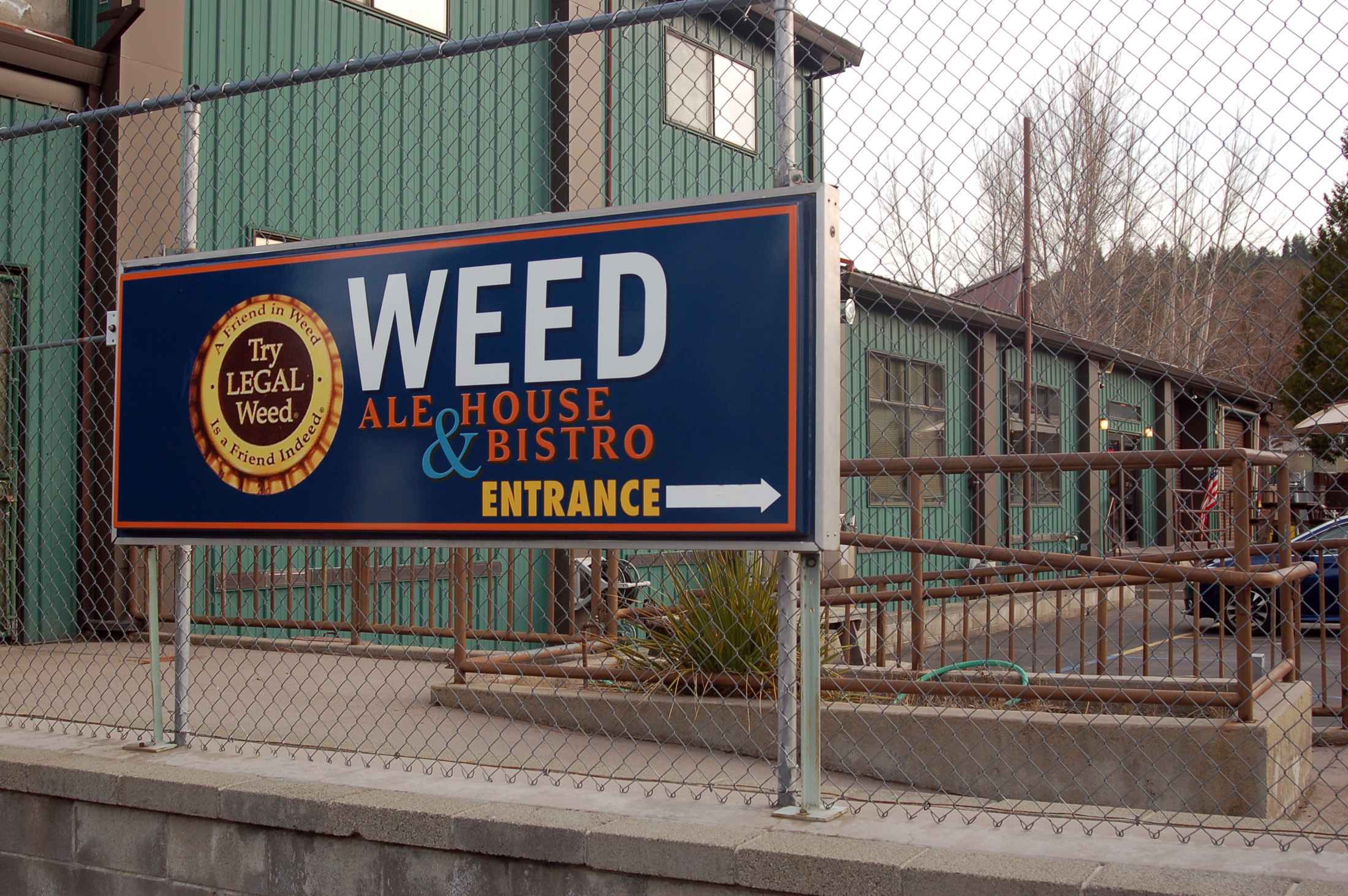
Mt. Shasta Brewing Company in Weed, California

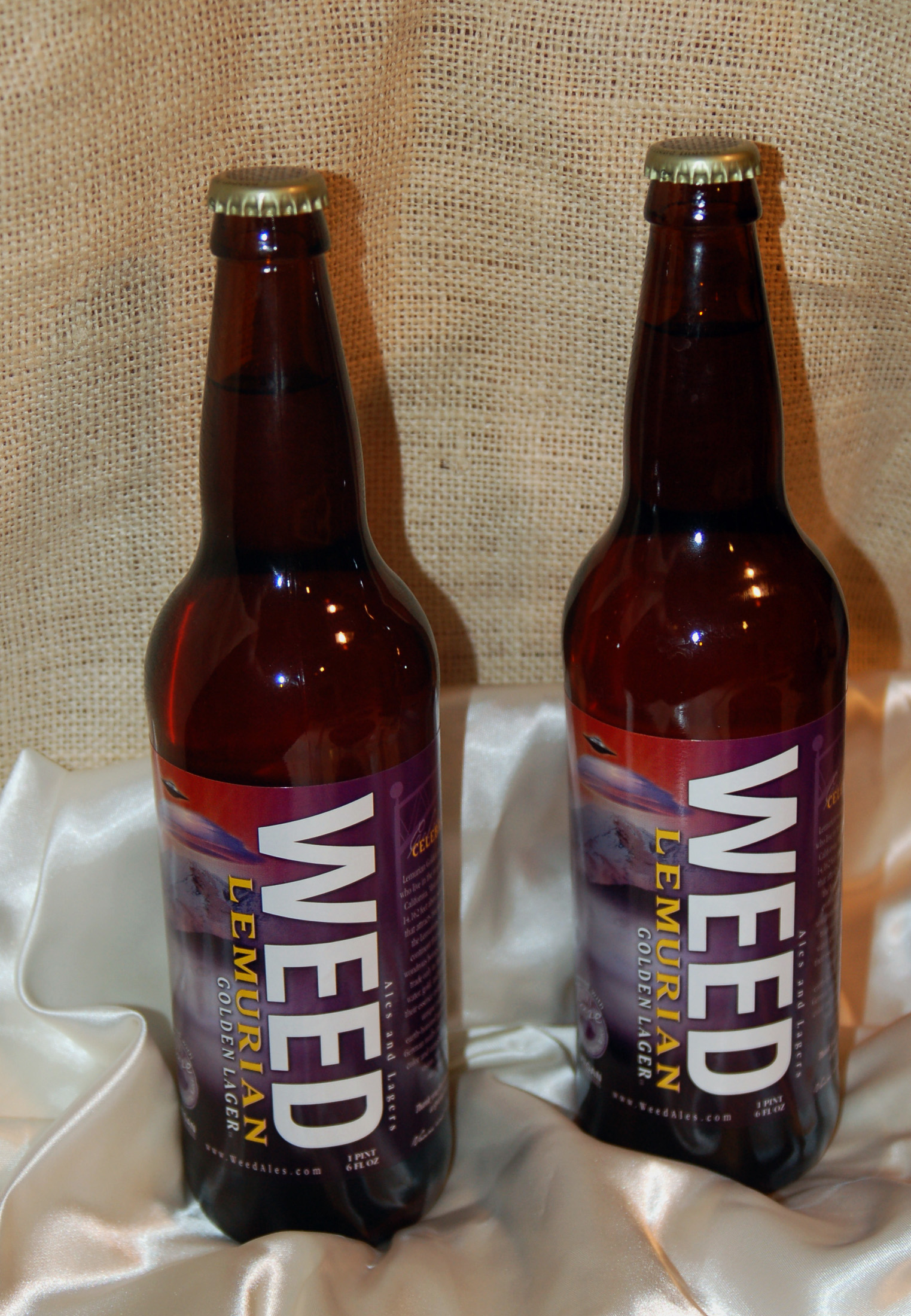
Lemurian Lager

Although historically reliant on logging, wood processing and forest-related products, Weed's economy has become more reliant on tourism as a source of economic activity. Weed's microbrewery, Mt. Shasta Brewing Company, relies on tourists for 92 percent of its business, according to co-owner Vaune Dillman.

Weed is part of the Shasta Valley Enterprise Zone which provides tax breaks, fee reductions, and permit fast-tracking for employers locating in the area.

As of 2007, the largest employers in Weed were:

- College of the Siskiyous (100–249 employees)
- Roseburg Forest Products (100–249 employees)
- Crystal Geyser CG Roxane (25–99 employees)
- Weed Union Elementary School District (25–99 employees)

As a small community with few retail outlets, taxable sales within the city are somewhat limited, totaling $89 million in 2012.

In the November 2014 general election, the voters of Weed passed Measure J, which raised the city's sales and use tax rate by 0.25 percent.

== Education ==
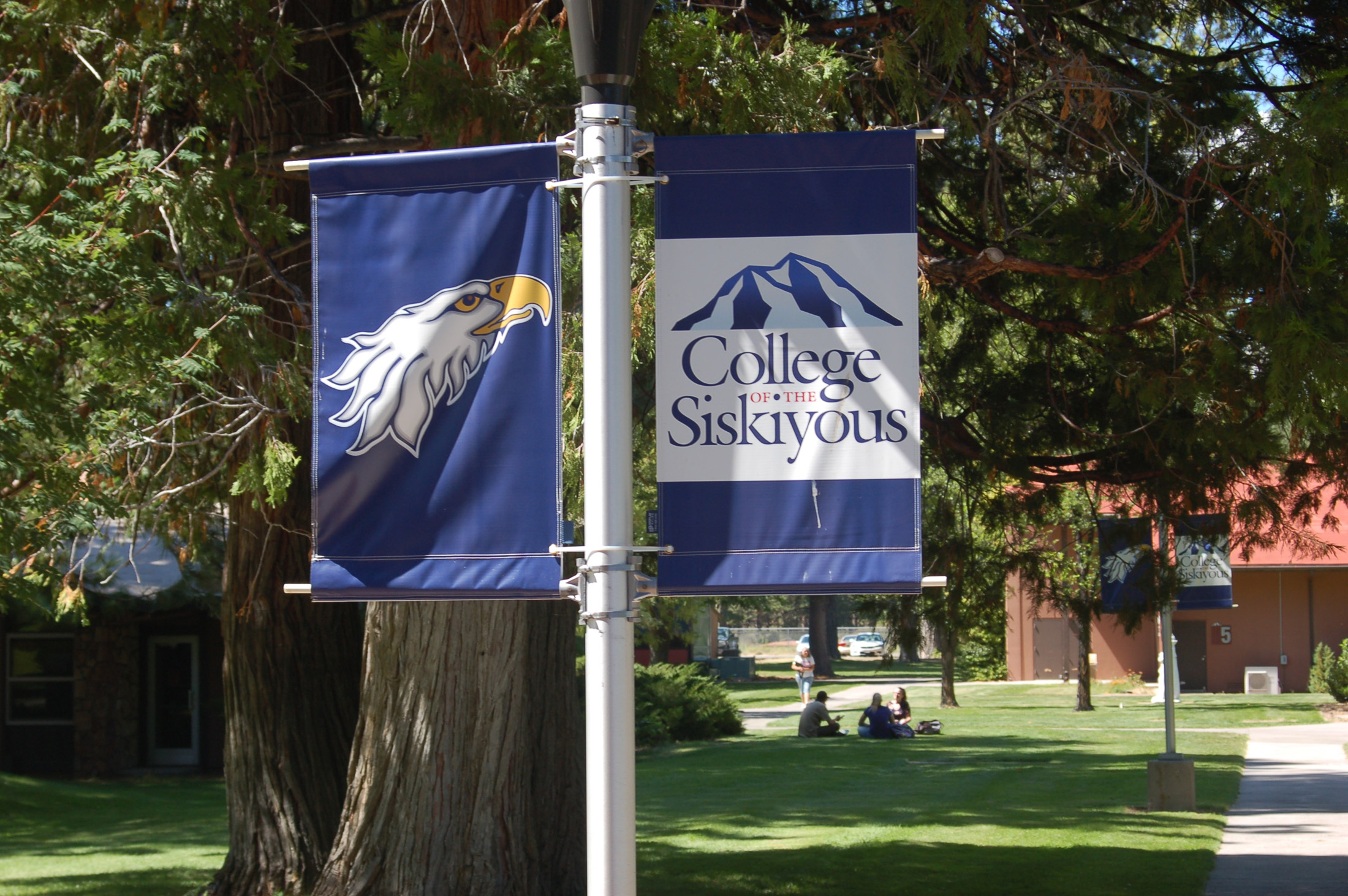
College of the Siskiyous, Weed, California

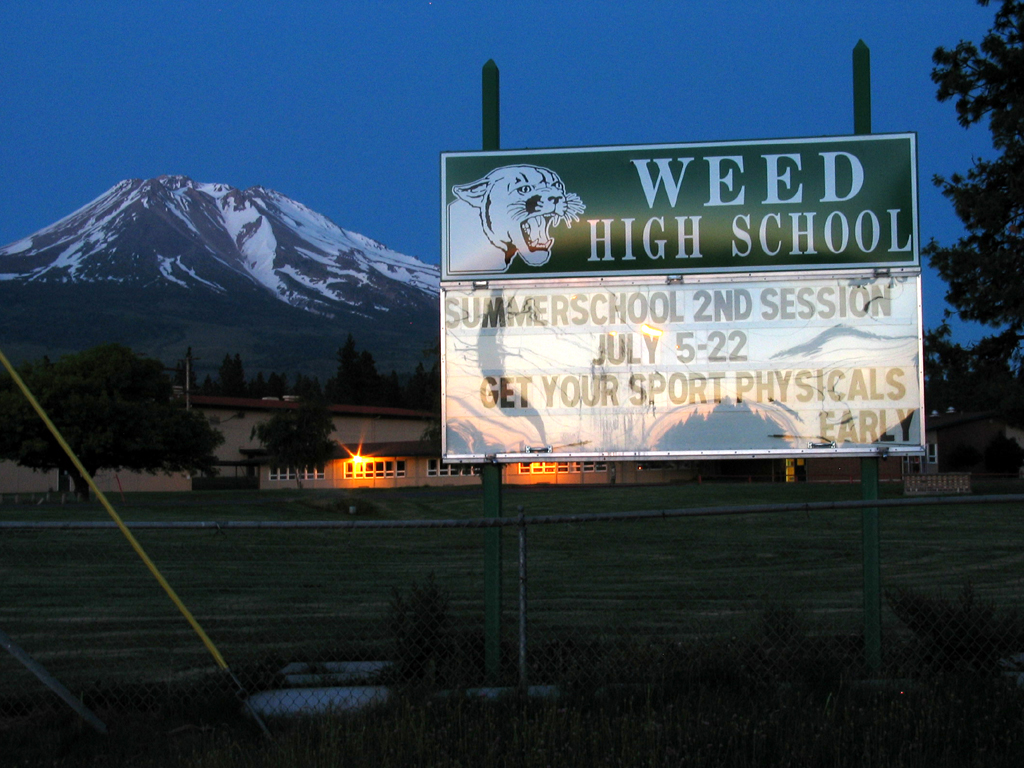
Mount Shasta is seen behind the sign for Weed High School.

Primary education in Weed is conducted at Weed Elementary School (K-8th grade). Butteville Elementary School (K-8th grade) is just outside the city of Weed, in the hamlet of Edgewood, and has an enrollment similar to Weed Elementary.

Secondary-level students are educated at Weed High School (grades 9–12), part of the Siskiyou Union High School District. The school is known for its picturesque campus and diverse student body.

The College of the Siskiyous, located in Weed, provides a steady source of employment for faculty and staff, a source of visitors for the local economy, and offers a two-year junior college education with various associate degree and vocational certificate programs.

== Recreation and tourism ==
Visitors use Weed as a base to engage in trout fishing in the nearby Klamath, Sacramento and McCloud Rivers, or come to see and climb Mount Shasta, Castle Crags or the Trinity Alps. Visitors also engage in nearby skiing (both alpine and cross-country) and biking, or hike to the waterfalls, streams and lakes in the area, including nearby Mossbrae Falls, Lake Siskiyou, Castle Lake and Shasta Lake.

The town's name, being the same as a slang term for cannabis, has caused it to gain a small notoriety. Many shops have popped up around town selling shirts and other trinkets that say "I Love Weed, California". Weed has struggled with sign theft, particularly with a sign that listed which way to turn for College of the Siskiyous or to downtown Weed, which simply listed "COLLEGE" with an arrow in one direction, and "WEED" with an arrow pointing the opposite direction. In 2025, it was reported that Caltrans changed the sign.

=== Recreation facilities and parks ===
Weed is near Castle Crags State Park, Lava Beds National Monument, and Lower Klamath National Wildlife Refuge. In addition to these state and federal parks, there are numerous local recreation opportunities.

- The Lake Shastina Golf Resort offers an 18-hole golf course, and a 9-hole Scottish links course in a scenic setting.
- Local parks managed by the Weed Parks and Recreation District include: Lincoln Park (renamed Charles Byrd Community Park in 2004) which is an 11-acre (4.5-hectare) park with restrooms, a playground, basketball courts, and is the home to the Weed Skatepark; as well as Bel Air Park, adjacent to College of the Siskiyous and home of the community swimming pool.
- Weed is on the Volcanic Legacy Scenic Byway, and is a short distance from the Pacific Crest Trail.
- Nearby Mount Shasta Ski Park offers alpine and Nordic skiing in winter, as well as summertime mountain biking, rock climbing, and a concert series.
- The same wind that prompted the founding of Weed, as it was used to dry wood products, makes nearby Lake Shastina a popular destination for short-board windsurfing.
- The Deer Mountain Snowmobile Park, is 18 miles (29 km) northeast of Weed on US Highway 97 and offers 250 miles (400 km) of groomed trails.

=== Historic sites and museums ===
- The Weed Historic Lumber Town Museum is a small, seasonal, local museum in the heart of Weed. It features sawmill machinery and artifacts from Weed's early days
- The Veterans' Living Memorial Sculpture Garden is 13 miles (21 km) northeast of Weed on US Highway 97, and consists of steel sculptures and other memorials honoring the service of U.S. veterans.

== Demographics ==
Historical population
Census	Pop.	Note	%±
1950	2,739		—
1960	3,223		17.7%
1970	2,983		−7.4%
1980	2,879		−3.5%
1990	3,062		6.4%
2000	2,978		−2.7%
2010	2,967		−0.4%
2020	2,862		−3.5%
2024 (est.)	2,633	▼	−8.0%
U.S. Decennial Census

=== 2020 census ===
As of the 2020 census, Weed had a population of 2,862 and a population density of 594.0 inhabitants per square mile (229.3/km^{2}). The median age was 35.7 years. The age distribution was 20.6% under the age of 18, 14.8% aged 18 to 24, 24.9% aged 25 to 44, 23.8% aged 45 to 64, and 15.9% who were 65 years of age or older. For every 100 females, there were 102.8 males, and for every 100 females age 18 and over there were 99.8 males age 18 and over.

The census reported that 94.3% of the population lived in households, 5.7% lived in non-institutionalized group quarters, and no one was institutionalized. 0.0% of residents lived in urban areas, while 100.0% lived in rural areas.

There were 1,131 households, out of which 30.4% included children under the age of 18, 32.5% were married-couple households, 11.6% were cohabiting couple households, 31.9% had a female householder with no spouse or partner present, and 24.0% had a male householder with no spouse or partner present. 30.2% of households were one person, and 12.3% were one person aged 65 or older. The average household size was 2.39. There were 673 families (59.5% of all households).

There were 1,281 housing units at an average density of 265.9 units per square mile (102.7 units/km^{2}), of which 1,131 (88.3%) were occupied. Of these, 45.9% were owner-occupied, and 54.1% were occupied by renters. 11.7% of housing units were vacant. The homeowner vacancy rate was 1.1% and the rental vacancy rate was 5.5%.

Racial composition as of the 2020 census
Race	Number	Percent
White	1,825	63.8%
Black or African American	173	6.0%
American Indian and Alaska Native	68	2.4%
Asian	158	5.5%
Native Hawaiian and Other Pacific Islander	3	0.1%
Some other race	219	7.7%
Two or more races	416	14.5%
Hispanic or Latino (of any race)	550	19.2%

=== 2010 census ===
The 2010 United States census reported that Weed had a population of 2,967. The population density was 618.9 inhabitants per square mile (239.0/km^{2}). The racial makeup of Weed was 2,221 (74.9 percent) white, 206 (6.9 percent) African-American, 70 (2.4 percent) Native American, 121 (4.1 percent) Asian, 27 (0.9 percent) Pacific Islander, 132 (4.4 percent) from other races, and 190 (6.4 percent) from two or more races. Hispanic or Latino of any race were 475 persons (16.0 percent).

The census reported that 2,820 people (95.0 percent of the population) lived in households, 101 (3.4 percent) lived in non-institutionalized group quarters, and 46 (1.6%) were institutionalized.

There were 1,131 households, out of which 385 (34 percent) had children under the age of 18 living in them, 447 (39.5 percent) were opposite-sex married couples living together, 188 (16.6 percent) had a female householder with no husband present, 81 (7.2 percent) had a male householder with no wife present. There were 103 (9.1 percent) unmarried opposite-sex partnerships, and 2 (0.2 percent) same-sex married couples or partnerships. Three hundred-eleven households (27.5 percent) were made up of individuals, and 125 (11.1 percent) had someone living alone who was 65 years of age or older. The average household size was 2.49. There were 716 families (63.3 percent of all households); the average family size was 3.02.

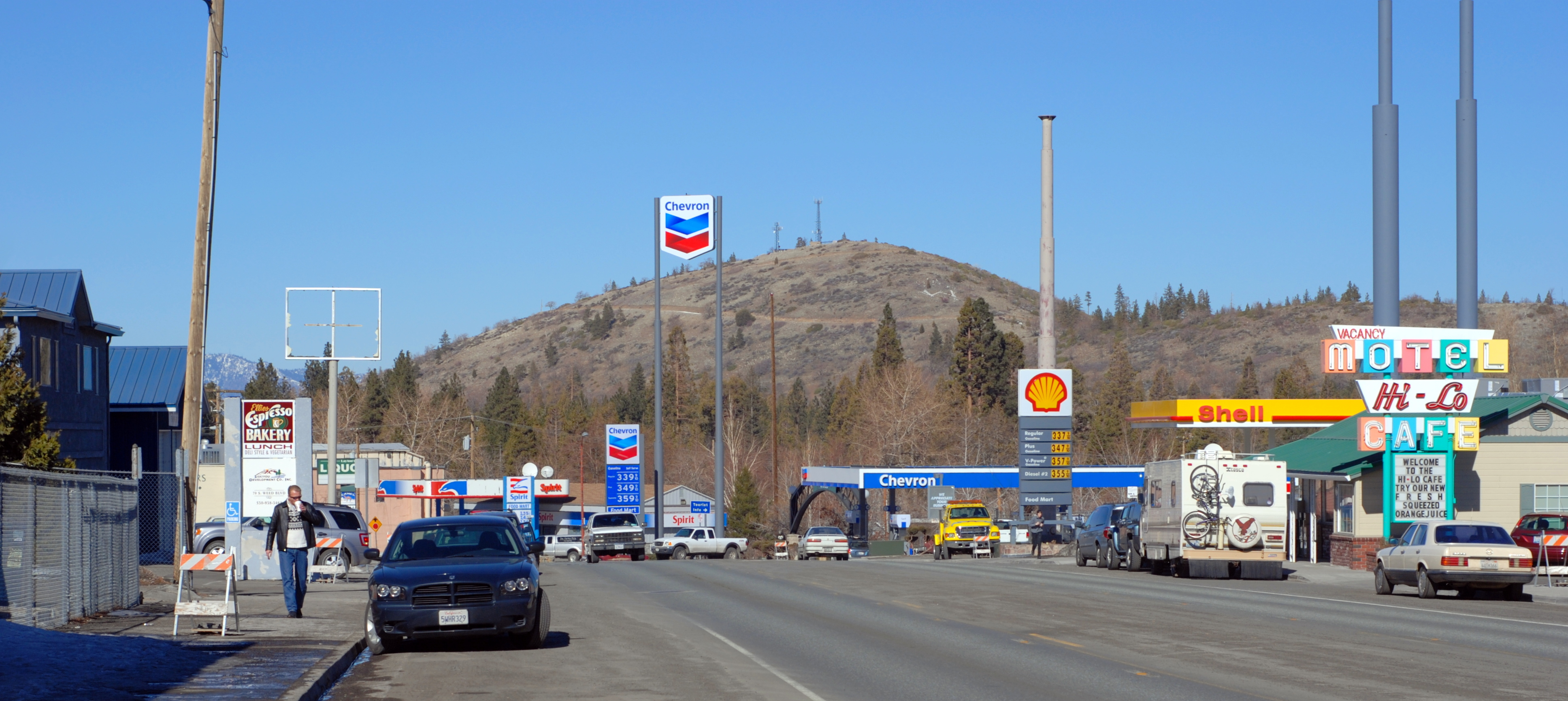
One of Weed's main streets

The population was spread out, with 735 people (24.8 percent) under the age of 18, 460 people (15.5 percent) aged 18 to 24, 660 people (22.2 percent) aged 25 to 44, 698 people (23.5 percent) aged 45 to 64, and 414 people (14 percent) who were 65 years of age or older. The median age was 32.7 years. For every 100 females, there were 100.7 males. For every 100 females age 18 and over, there were 100 males.

There were 1,273 housing units at an average density of 265.5 per square mile (102.5/km^{2}), of which 543 (48 percent) were owner-occupied, and 588 (52 percent) were occupied by renters. The homeowner vacancy rate was 3.3%; the rental vacancy rate was 8.8 percent. Forty-three percent of the population (1,275 persons) lived in owner-occupied housing units and 1,545 people (52.1 percent) lived in rental housing units.

=== Income and poverty ===
In 2023, the US Census Bureau estimated that the median household income was $38,966, and the per capita income was $31,136. About 19.4% of families and 28.4% of the population were below the poverty line.

=== Other statistics ===
The number of violent crimes recorded by the FBI in 2003 was 25. The number of murders and homicides was one. The violent crime rate was 8.5 per 1,000 people.

Traffic: The average commute time for Weed workers is 12 minutes, compared with 26 minutes nationwide.

Housing: Median rent in Weed, at the time of the 2000 Census, was $348. Monthly mortgages were $676. Average monthly rent in all of California is $1341.

Education: seven percent of Weed residents age 25 and older have a bachelor's or advanced college degree.

Of the population 84.97 percent spoke English as their primary language, while 15.02 percent did not; of those 9.87 percent speak Spanish, 2.90 speak Italian, and 2.23 percent speak Laotian. One hundred percent of the population speaks English.

=== Ethnic migration ===
Weed's historic lumber industry and manufacturing facilities made it a magnet for ethnic minority migration, that may not have otherwise been the case in this region of the country. A large number of Italian immigrants migrated to Weed, and other towns in southern Siskiyou County at the turn of the 20th century. While immigrants were a source of labor for the region, they were not always well treated, in fact in 1909 complaints from workers in the lumber industry reached the Italian consul. However, in time the Italian population came to be a cornerstone of Weed civic life. Many streets in the early Italian neighborhood bear names of Italian cities, such as Rome, Genoa, Como, and Venice. Annually since 1954, Weed has held the Weed Italian Carnevale in June or July, although recently dropping "Italian" from its name while maintaining the Italian spelling of carnival and the traditional bocce ball tournaments.

A large number of black-Americans migrated to Weed as well, to work in Long-Bell Lumber Company's Weed facility after the company closed two mills in Louisiana in 1922. The company promised to advance travel expenses and provide housing for workers relocating to Weed. Immigrants locating in Weed since the 1980s have come primarily from Mexico and Laos. As a result of these migrations, Weed has a much more ethnically diverse population than Siskiyou County as a whole. Netting the Hispanic or Latino population out of Census figures for white race, Weed's white population is 60.6 percent compared to Siskiyou County at 79.5 percent using the same metric.

== Politics ==
The city council of Weed is composed of five members who are elected at large and serve four-year terms. The mayor and mayor pro tem are elected each year from the five council members and serve a one-year term. As of 2025, Darrell Parham is currently serving as mayor of Weed, with Ken Palfini serving as mayor pro tem.

In the state legislature Weed is in the 1st senatorial district, represented by Republican Megan Dahle, and the 1st Assembly district, represented by Republican Heather Hadwick.

Federally, Weed is in California's 1st congressional district, represented by Republican James Gallagher.

In Siskiyou County Supervisoral District 3, in which Weed is the core community, voter registration was 39.6 percent Democrat, 39.1 percent Republican, 16.2 percent decline to state, with remainder split among other political parties such as Green and Libertarian as of 2006.

== Notable people ==
- Mario Pastega (1916–2012), businessman and philanthropist, born in Weed
- Pamela Courson (1946–1974), long-term companion of Jim Morrison, vocalist of The Doors, born in Weed
- Aaron Thomas (1937–2024), NFL player, tight end for San Francisco 49ers and New York Giants; grew up in Weed and graduated from Weed High School
- Maurice A. Preston (1912–1983), general

== Local media ==
- KHWA 99.3 Mount Shasta, 101.7 Yreka and 102.3 Weed
- KZRO-FM 100.1 "z100 FM" Mount Shasta
- KKLC 107.9 K-LOVE Fall River Mills
- Northland Communications
- MCTV 15 Mountain Community Television (at College of the Siskiyous)
- Weed Press is the official newspaper of Weed.

== In popular culture ==
John Steinbeck's novella-play Of Mice and Men begins with the protagonists, George and Lennie, fleeing a farm they worked at in Weed after Lennie got into trouble.

Weed is the setting of a large subplot in Harry Turtledove's alternate history The Hot War.

The song "Velvety" from the 2002 album Devil's Workshop by Frank Black and the Catholics mentions the town of Weed. "Out on the Eisenhower where I lost my speed just a little bit south of a town called Weed".
