= Mercy High School (Red Bluff, California) =

Private school in Red Bluff, California, United States

Location
- 233 Riverside Way; Red Bluff, (Tehama County), California 96080; United States; 40°10′27″N 122°13′50″W

Information
- Type: Private
- Religious affiliation: Roman Catholic
- Established: 1882
- Founder: Sisters of Mercy
- School district: (sacred heart school district)
- Oversight: Diocese of Sacramento
- President: Weber
- Grades: 9-12
- Gender: Coeducational
- Colors: Navy and White
- Team name: Warriors
- Accreditation: Western Association of Schools and Colleges
- Tuition: $8,100 (2009-2010)
- Website: http://www.mercy-high.org

Mercy High School is a private, Roman Catholic high school in Red Bluff, California. It is located in the Roman Catholic Diocese of Sacramento.

== Background ==
Mercy High School was established in 1882 as Our Lady of Mercy Academy by the Sisters of Mercy. It became Mercy High School when it moved to its present location in 1959.

Mercy has a long history of great sports and academics.

In 2020 it was scheduled to close; however a plan was proposed in which the school would remain as a distance learning school where students access courses via computer from their local parishes.
