= Mount Shasta High School =

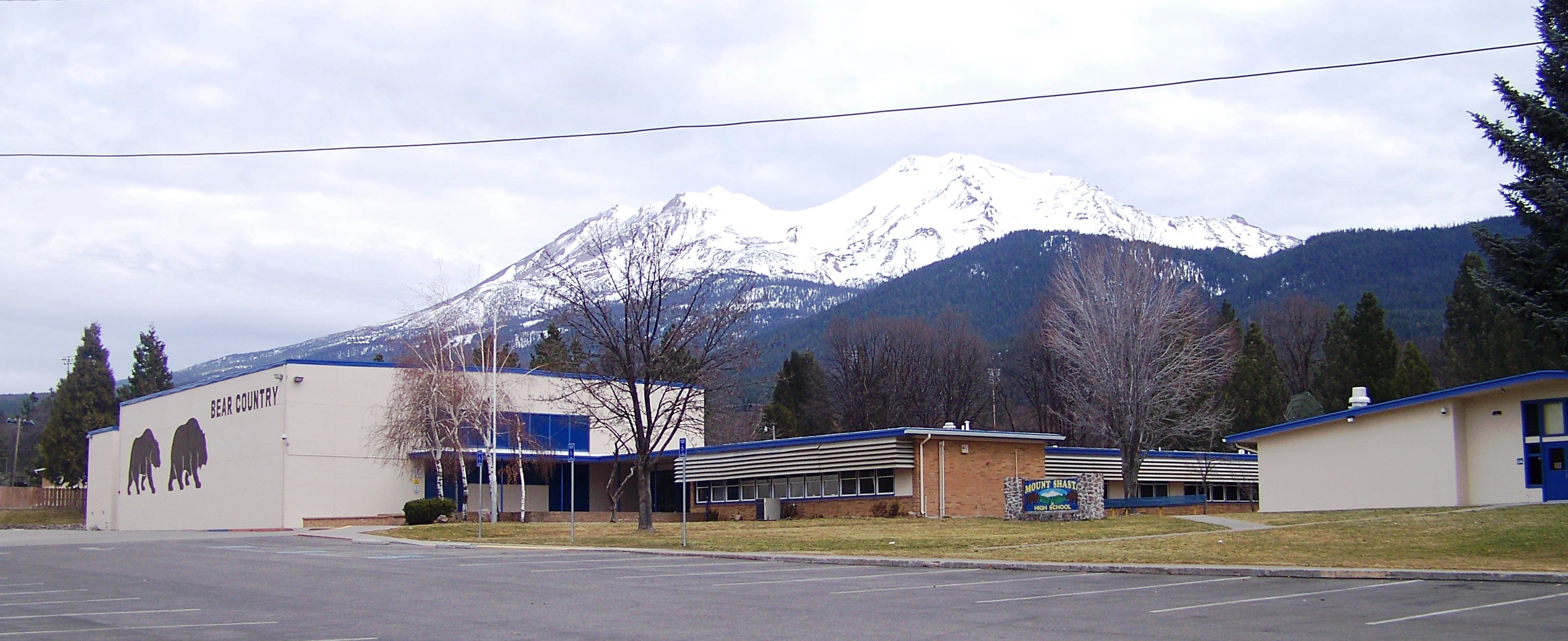
- Mount Shasta High School, the district's largest school

Location
- 710 Everett Memorial Highway; Mount Shasta, Siskiyou County, California 96067; United States
- Coordinates: 41°19′18″N 122°18′19″W

Information
- Type: Public
- School district: Siskiyou Union High School District
- Superintendent: Marie Caldwell
- Principal: Allison Blankenship
- Teaching staff: 16.28 (FTE)
- Grades: 9–12
- Enrollment: 262 (2023–2024)
- Student to teacher ratio: 16.09
- Colors: Blue and gold
- Athletics conference: CIF Northern Section Shasta Cascade League
- Mascot: Bear
- Rival: Weed High School
- Newspaper: Mount Shasta Herald
- Website: Mount Shasta High Scool

Mount Shasta High School is a public high school located in Mount Shasta, California in southern Siskiyou County. It is one of the five members of the Siskiyou Union High School District. The school's mascot is a bear.

== Overview ==
Mount Shasta High School was recognized as a California Distinguished High School in 2013. It also received a six year accreditation term during the 2009–10 school year. It operates on an eight period schedule from 8:00 a.m. to 3:05 p.m. with a break for on or off campus lunch. Students are required to have at least six scheduled classes out of the eight available periods.

=== Demographics ===
The student population of about 400 is:

- 84% Caucasian
- 9% Hispanic
- 4% Asian
- 2% Black
- 1% Hawaiian native/Pacific islander

== Academics ==
Mount Shasta High School offers all required core classes for grades 9–12, along with a variety of Advanced Placement classes. Advanced Placement classes offered include English, Spanish, biology, environmental science, psychology, statistics, calculus, and art. One or more of these Advanced Placement classes are taken by about 30% percent of students each year. Students can take vocational classes such as wood shop and manufacturing or general knowledge enhancement classes such as Microsoft Office. There are also several performing arts classes offered for students such as band, jazz band, choir and theater. Classes focusing on business and video production/technology are offered to select students pending the instructor's approval. In order for students to be eligible for participation in any athletic program, they must maintain a specific GPA, follow the athletic code of conduct, and attend all classes on days of athletic participation such as games and practices. Student athletes have the option to apply for up to one year of alternative physical education credit through their participation in athletic programs.

== Activities ==
Mount Shasta High School offers several campus organized clubs for student participation.

=== Student leadership ===
The student leadership program consists of a select group of students who organize on campus events. They are responsible for scheduling and planning organized activities such as school assemblies, spirit weeks, and dances.

=== Link crew ===
Link crew is a program supported by Mount Shasta High School that allows junior and senior level students to assist incoming freshmen and transfer students in their first year. The program helps provide new students with knowledge about the campus, information about high school rules and regulations, and a mentor that they can contact if they need continued assistance.

=== Virtual enterprise ===
This class is available to students as practice for creating and running a business. In order to be accepted into this class, students must submit an application and go through an interview process. The class creates a hypothetical business and students participate as members of financial, marketing, advertising, and human resource departments in an attempt to continue running the business.

== Athletics ==
The Mount Shasta High School athletic program, known as the "Bears", has several athletic programs available for students. Eligible students can participate in volleyball, football, cheerleading, cross country, wrestling, golf, basketball, track and field, softball, baseball, tennis, soccer or the ski and snowboard team. Students are generally allowed to participate in one athletic program per sports season, as long as they have met all of the school's requirements.

=== Athletic facilities ===
- Football – Jason Sehorn Field (see note below)
- Volleyball, basketball, wrestling – Robert E. Novo Gymnasium
- Softball – Skye MacKenzie Field
- Baseball – MSHS Baseball Field
- Skiing – Mt. Shasta Ski Park
- Soccer - Shastice Park

On 23 June 2012, a petition drive was started to name the school's football field in honor of former coach and athletic director Joe Blevins, who died on June 21, 2012.

=== Retired numbers and notable athletes ===
1 – Jason Sehorn (football, former NFL cornerback who played for the New York Giants and St. Louis Rams)
