= Siskiyou Union High School District =

School district in California

Address
- 624 Everett Memorial Highway Mount Shasta, Siskiyou County, California, 96067; United States

District information
- Type: Public
- Grades: 9–12
- Superintendent: Michael Wharton Jr.
- NCES District ID: 0636940

Students and staff
- Students: 537 (2020–2021)
- Teachers: 32.19 (FTE)
- Staff: 26.28 (FTE)
- Student–teacher ratio: 16.68:1
- Athletic conference: CIF Northern Section

Other information
- Website: www.sisuhsd.net

The Siskiyou Union High School District is a public secondary education school district in Siskiyou County, California. There are presently five small rural high schools within the district, four of which are traditional secondary education facilities: Mt. Shasta High School, Weed High School, Happy Camp High School, and McCloud High School; the fifth, Jefferson High School is the district's continuation school. District offices are located in Mount Shasta, California.

Enrollment at each of the district's schools is as follows:

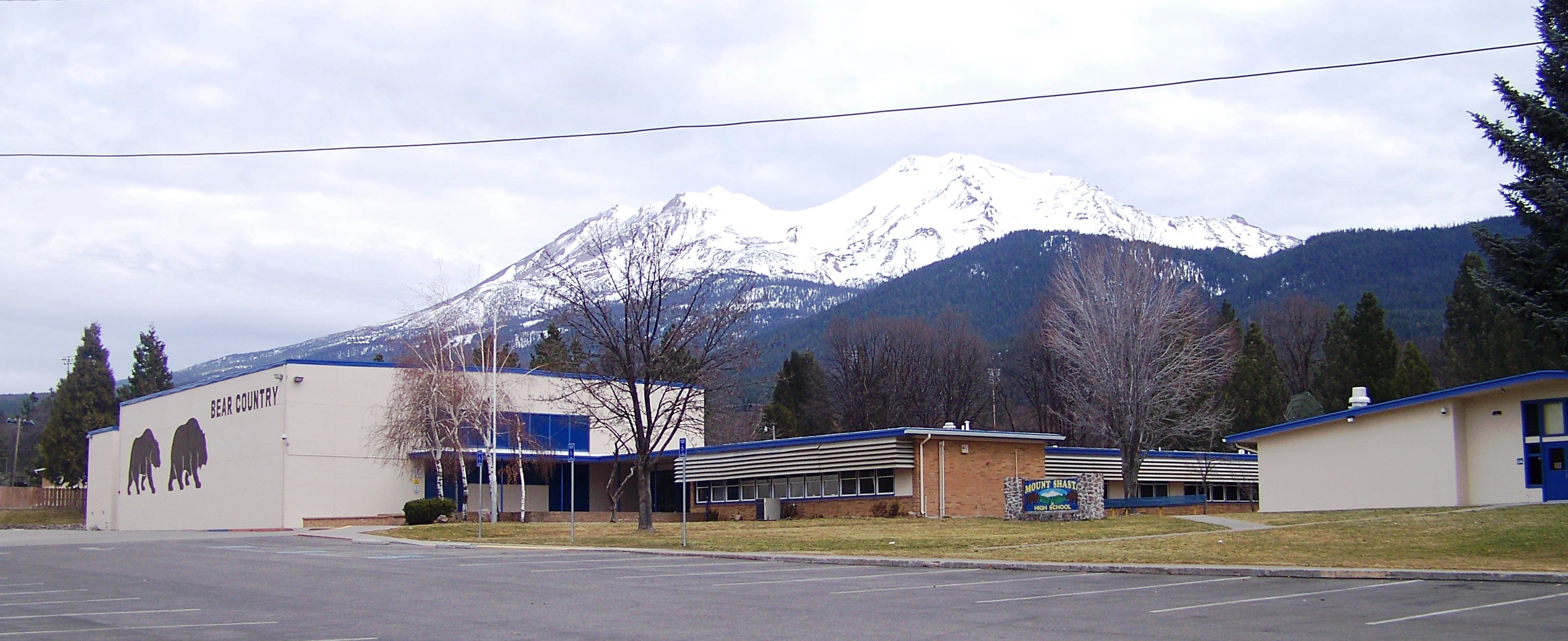
Mount Shasta High School, the district's largest school.

School	Community	Enrollment
Happy Camp High School	Happy Camp	84
Jefferson High School	Mt. Shasta	21
McCloud High School	McCloud	25
Mt. Shasta High School	Mt. Shasta	429
Weed High School	Weed	196
