= Abner Weed =

American politician

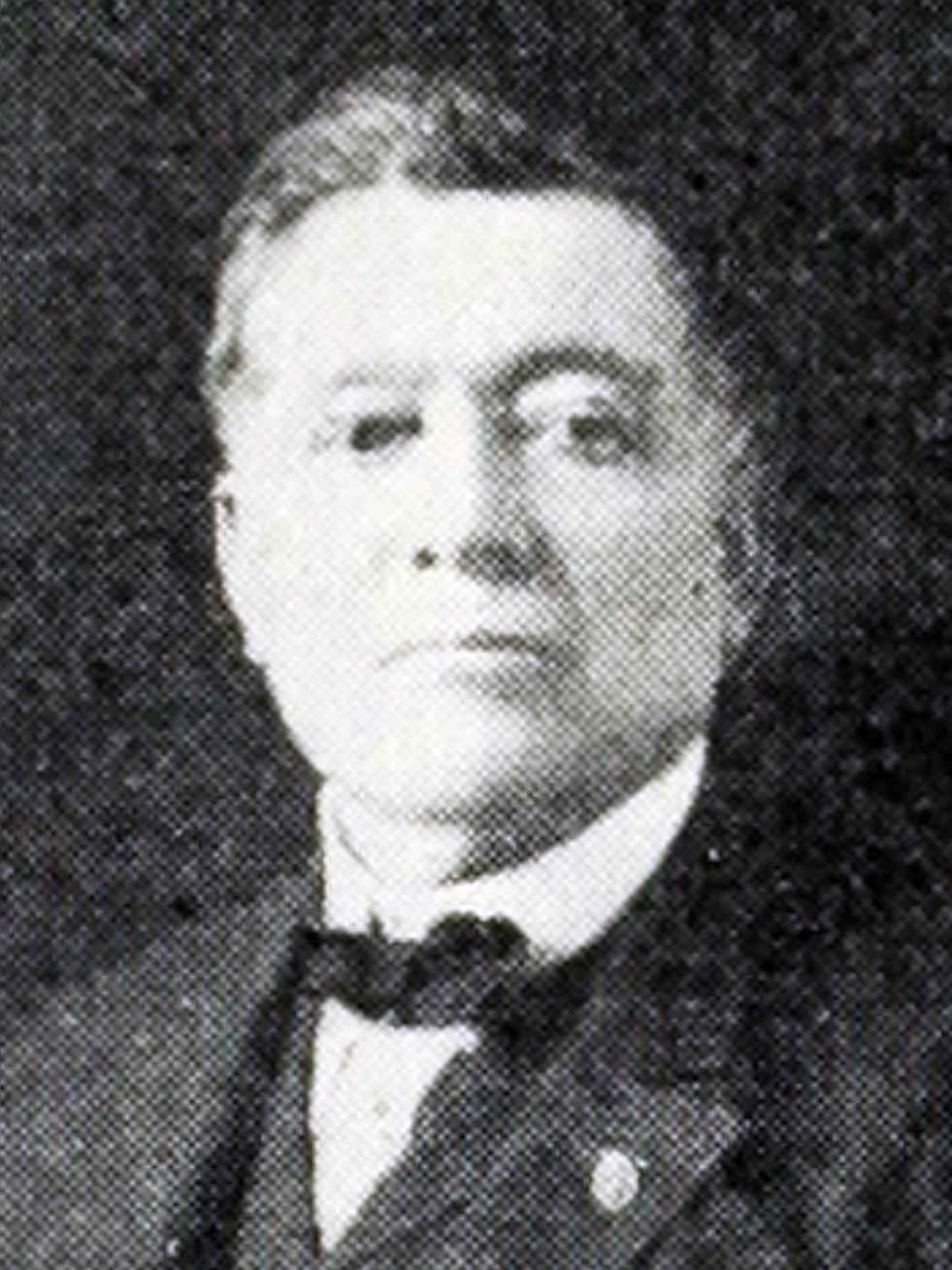

Member of the California Senate from the 2nd district
- In office January 7, 1907 – January 2, 1911
- Preceded by: Clifford Coggins
- Succeeded by: Thaddeus Wilton Huff Shanahan

Personal details
- Born: September 18, 1842 Dixmont, Maine, U.S.
- Died: June 14, 1917 (aged 75) Weed, California, U.S.
- Party: Republican
- Spouse: Rachael Cobb Cunningham (after 1866)
- Children: 4

Military service
- Allegiance: United States
- Branch/service: Union Army
- Rank: 8th Maine Infantry Regiment
- Battles/wars: American Civil War

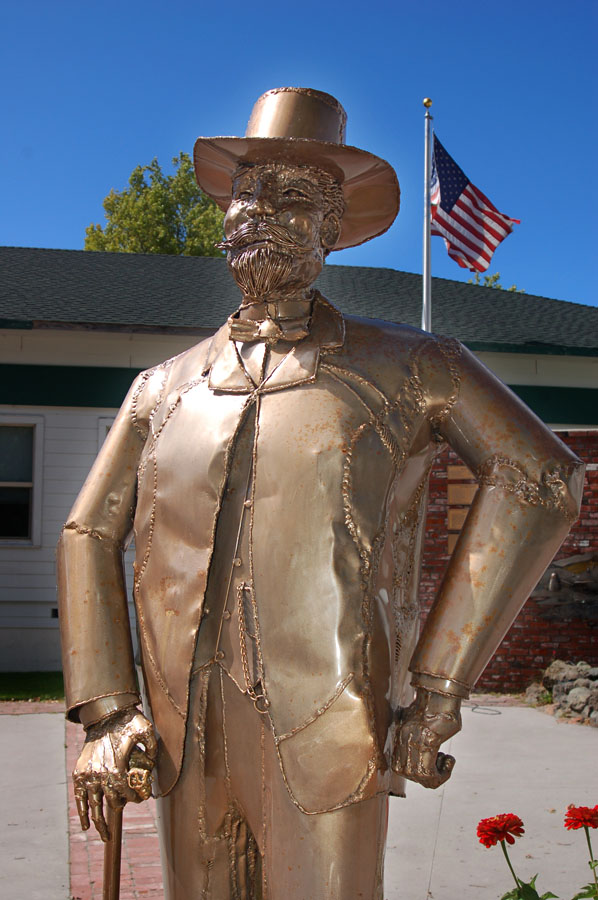
Statue of Abner Weed - founder of the City of Weed in northern California - located at 550 Main Street, Weed's Centennial Plaza was constructed with bricks salvaged from Abner Weed's old sawmill.

Abner Edward Weed (September 18, 1842 – June 14, 1917) was an American politician who served as a soldier in the American Civil War with Company C, 8th Maine Infantry Regiment, and was present at Appomattox, Virginia, to witness Lee's surrender to Grant. On September 18, 1866, he married Rachel C. Cunningham, and came to California in 1869, locating in Truckee. Between 1869 and 1889, he was actively engaged in the development of the country between Truckee and Sierraville. In 1889, he moved with his family to Mount Shasta where he was actively engaged in industry and important developments of Siskiyou County. He was the founder of the mammoth Weed holdings at Weed, and the builder of the Hotel Weed in Dunsmuir, California, which bears his name. He built and sold the S.P. Co. thirty miles of railroad from Weed to Grass Lake in 1902, and in 1904, sold his immense holdings at Weed to R.A. Long of Kansas City, Mo. Besides this he accumulated large property interests in Oregon, Scott Valley and near Stockton. He served this district as Senator during the years of 1907–1909 and was Siskiyou County supervisor for eight years.
