= Happy Camp High School =

Location
- 234 Indian Creek Road; Happy Camp, Siskiyou County, California 96039; United States
- Coordinates: 41.79540°N 123.37814°W

Information
- Type: Public
- School district: Siskiyou Union High School District
- Superintendent: Marie Caldwell
- Principal: Alfonso Garagarza
- Teaching staff: 3.62 (FTE)
- Grades: 9-12
- Enrollment: 56 (2023–2024)
- Student to teacher ratio: 15.47
- Colors: Blue and gold
- Athletics conference: CIF Northern Section Evergreen League
- Mascot: Indian
- Rival: Butte Valley High School
- Website: www.happycamp-highschool.com

Happy Camp High School is a public high school located in Happy Camp, California. It is a member of the Siskiyou Union High School District. The school's mascot is the Indians.
