= Weed Airport =

Airport in California, United States of America

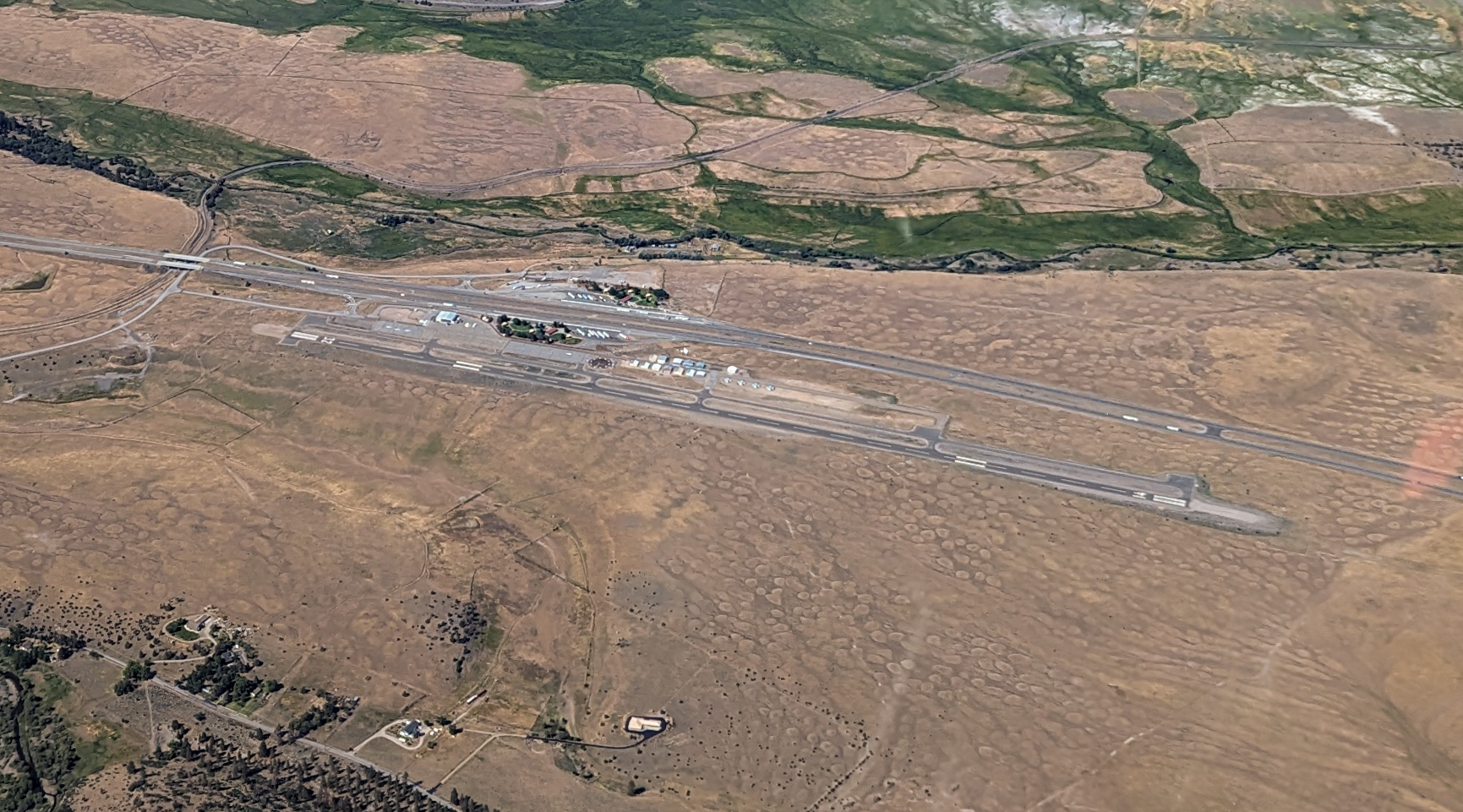
- Aerial view of Weed Airport
- IATA: none; ICAO: none; FAA LID: O46

Summary
- Airport type: Public
- Operator: County of Siskiyou
- Location: Weed, California
- Elevation AMSL: 2,943 ft / 897 m
- Coordinates: 41°28′30″N 122°27′11″W
- Interactive map of Weed Airport

Runways
Direction	Length		Surface
Direction	ft	m	Surface
14/32	5,000	1,524	Asphalt

Weed Airport (FAA LID: O46) is a public airport located four miles (6.4 km) northwest of Weed, serving Siskiyou County, California, USA. This general aviation airport covers 344 acres (139 ha) and has one runway.
