= CIF Northern Section =

High school athletic organization in California

- Abbreviation: CIF-NS
- Type: NPO
- Legal status: Association
- Purpose: Athletic
- Headquarters: Chico, California
- Region served: Northern California inland region
- Members: 73 schools
- Commissioner: Elizabeth Kyle
- Affiliations: California Interscholastic Federation
- Website: www.cifns.org

CIF Northern Section (NS) is a governing body of public and private high school athletics in California. Member schools are located in the inland northeastern portion of the state roughly encompassed by the I-5 corridor to the bottom of the Sacramento Valley. It is one of ten sections that compose the California Interscholastic Federation (CIF). Northern Section comprises three conferences National Conference, American Conference, and California Conference. These conferences in turn comprise three leagues. The organization's offices are located in Chico.

== Sports ==
- 8-man Football
- Alpine Skiing
- Badminton
- Baseball
- Basketball
- Cross Country
- Field Hockey
- Football
- Golf
- Soccer
- Softball
- Swimming
- Tennis
- Track and Field
- Volleyball
- Wrestling

== Conferences ==
- National Conference (20 schools)
- American Conference (27 schools)
- California Conference (26 schools)
