= Lake Shastina, California =

- Unincorporated community Census-designated place
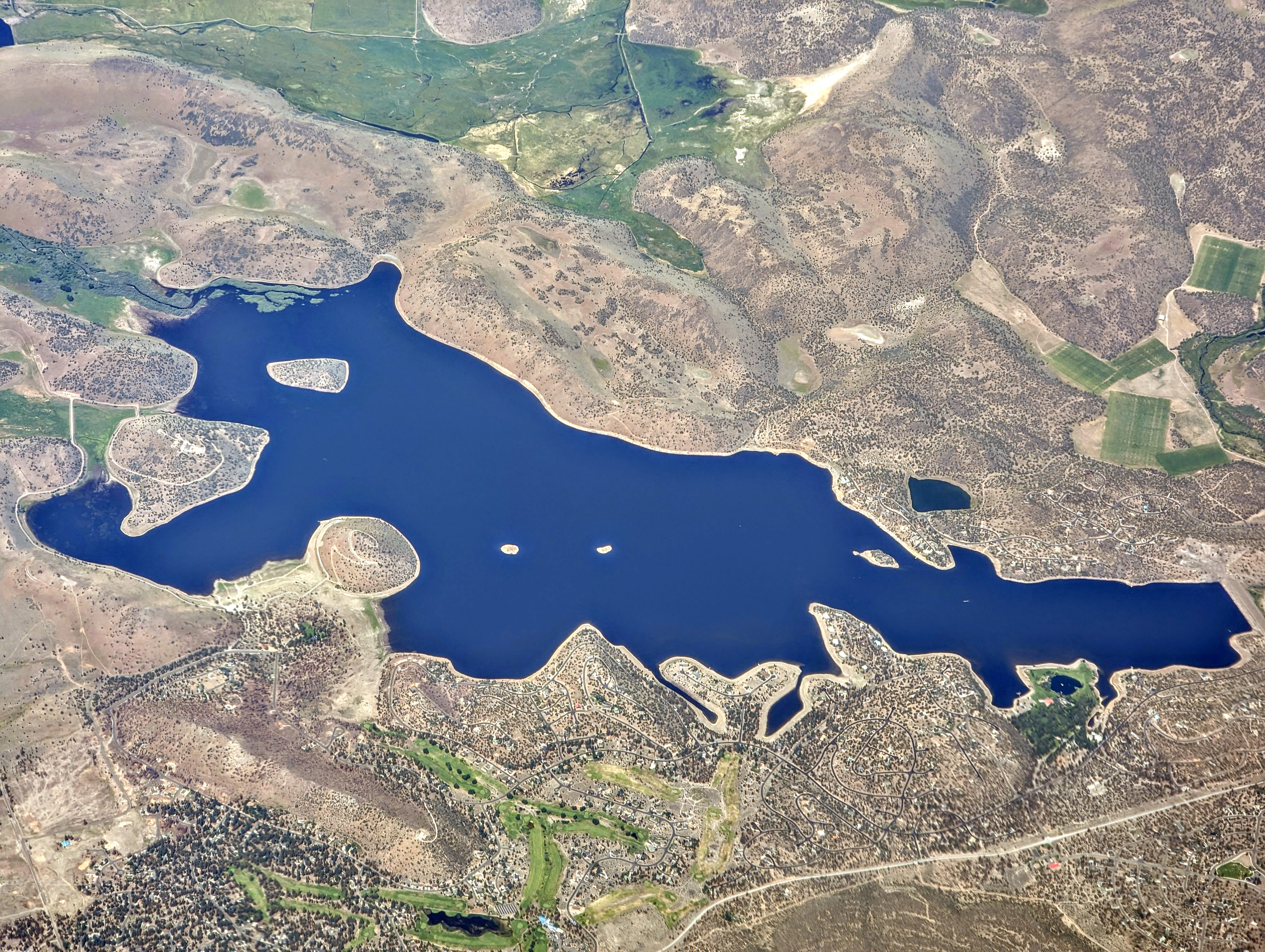

- Location within California Location within the United States
- Coordinates: 41°31′16″N 122°22′26″W
- Country: United States
- State: California
- County: Siskiyou

Area
  - Total: 5.00 sq mi (12.96 km^{2})
  - Land: 4.01 sq mi (10.39 km^{2})
  - Water: 0.99 sq mi (2.56 km^{2})
- Elevation: 2,818 ft (859 m)

Population (2020)
  - Total: 2,401
  - Density: 598.5/sq mi (231.1/km^{2})
- Time zone: UTC-8 (Pacific (PST))
  - Summer (DST): UTC-7 (PDT)
- ZIP Code: 96094 (Weed)
- Area code: 530
- FIPS code: 06-39728
- GNIS feature ID: 2805902

Lake Shastina is an unincorporated community and census-designated place (CDP) in Siskiyou County, California, United States. It is a residential community sited on the east side of the lake of the same name. The lake is a reservoir of the Shasta River. As of the 2020 census, Lake Shastina had a population of 2,401.

The community of Lake Shastina is 9 miles (14 km) north of Weed.

== Demographics ==
Historical population
Census	Pop.	Note	%±
2020	2,401		—
U.S. Decennial Census; 1850–1870 1880-1890; 1900 1910 1920; 1930 1940 1950; 1960 1970 1980; 1990 2000 2010; 2020

Lake Shastina first appeared as a census designated place in the 2020 U.S. census.

=== 2020 census ===
As of the 2020 census, Lake Shastina had a population of 2,401. The median age was 52.1 years. 18.4% of residents were under the age of 18 and 29.6% of residents were 65 years of age or older. For every 100 females there were 94.4 males, and for every 100 females age 18 and over there were 91.9 males age 18 and over.

0.0% of residents lived in urban areas, while 100.0% lived in rural areas.

There were 1,063 households in Lake Shastina, of which 19.7% had children under the age of 18 living in them. Of all households, 53.2% were married-couple households, 17.6% were households with a male householder and no spouse or partner present, and 22.8% were households with a female householder and no spouse or partner present. About 30.6% of all households were made up of individuals and 15.9% had someone living alone who was 65 years of age or older.

There were 1,264 housing units, of which 15.9% were vacant. The homeowner vacancy rate was 1.2% and the rental vacancy rate was 4.5%.

Lake Shastina CDP, California – Racial and ethnic composition Note: the US Census treats Hispanic/Latino as an ethnic category. This table excludes Latinos from the racial categories and assigns them to a separate category. Hispanics/Latinos may be of any race.
Race / Ethnicity (NH = Non-Hispanic)	Pop 2020	% 2020
White alone (NH)	1,858	77.38%
Black or African American alone (NH)	46	1.92%
Native American or Alaska Native alone (NH)	31	1.29%
Asian alone (NH)	73	3.04%
Pacific Islander alone (NH)	1	0.04%
Other race alone (NH)	17	0.71%
Mixed race or Multiracial (NH)	120	5.00%
Hispanic or Latino (any race)	255	10.62%
Total	2,401	100.00%
