= Etna High School =

Location
- 400 Howell Avenue; Etna, California 96027; United States; 41.4609°N 122.8987°W

Information
- School type: Public
- Established: 1891
- Principal: Joy Isbell
- Staff: 14.46 (FTE)
- Enrollment: 189 (2023–2024)
- Student to teacher ratio: 13.07
- Colours: Red, black, and white
- Slogan: "Lions are Lifelong Learners"
- Team name: Lions
- Communities served: Scott Valley, Quartz Valley Indian Community, Sawyers Bar, Cecilville
- Website: https://www.svusd.us/etna-high-school/

Etna High School (EHS) (also known as Etna Union High School) is a small public high school in Etna, California, United States.

== History ==
Etna High School was founded in 1891 in Etna, a community founded as a result of the California Gold Rush.

For the 2015-2016 school year, there are 24 members of the faculty and staff.

== Academics ==
Spanish is offered as a second language.

== Athletics ==
Etna High School's colors are red, white, and black, and the team names are the Lions. Mitch Thackery is the Athletic Director. The seasonal sports offered are as follows:

Fall	Winter	Spring
Cross country	Basketball	Baseball
Football	Wrestling	Softball
Soccer		Tennis
Volleyball		Track
