= Trinity High School (Weaverville, California) =

Location
- 321 Victory Lane; Weaverville, California 96093; United States
- Coordinates: 40°44′22″N 122°56′51″W

Information
- School type: Public secondary school
- School district: Trinity Alps Unified School District
- Superintendent: Jaime Green
- Principal: Corey Helgesen
- Teaching staff: 19.07 (on an FTE basis)
- Grades: 9-12
- Enrollment: 316 (2022-2023)
- Student to teacher ratio: 16.57
- Colors: Red and white
- Athletics conference: CIF Northern Section
- Nickname: Wolfpack
- Rival: Mount Shasta High School
- Website: www.trinitywolves.org

Trinity High School (THS) is a high school located in Weaverville, California, in Trinity County. The student population is 400, and the grades are 9–12.

Students travel from Coffee Creek, Salyer, Buckhorn Mountain, and Browns Creek to attend THS. The campus is on 23 acres (93,000 m^{2}), and contains twenty-six classrooms, a library, career center, gym, and cafeteria.

The school colors are Red, White and Grey, and the mascot is the Wolf. THS has many extracurricular activities including athletics, academic decathlon, drama, music, and a wide range of clubs.

== Classes ==
The school offers a variety of both standard and AP curriculum based classes.

== Athletics ==
Trinity High School is a part of the Northern Section California Interscholastic Federation.

=== Sports teams ===
Interscholastic Athletic Teams
Sport	Season	Gender
Baseball	Spring	Boys'
Basketball	Winter	Boys', Girls'
Cross-Country	Fall	Girls', Boys'
Football	Fall	Boys'
Soccer	Fall (Girls'), Spring (Boys')	Boys', Girls'
Softball	Spring	Girls'
Track (outdoor)	Spring	Boys', Girls'
Volleyball	Fall	Girls'
Wrestling	Winter	Coed

== Notable alumni ==
- Brian Johnson - musician
