= Weed High School =

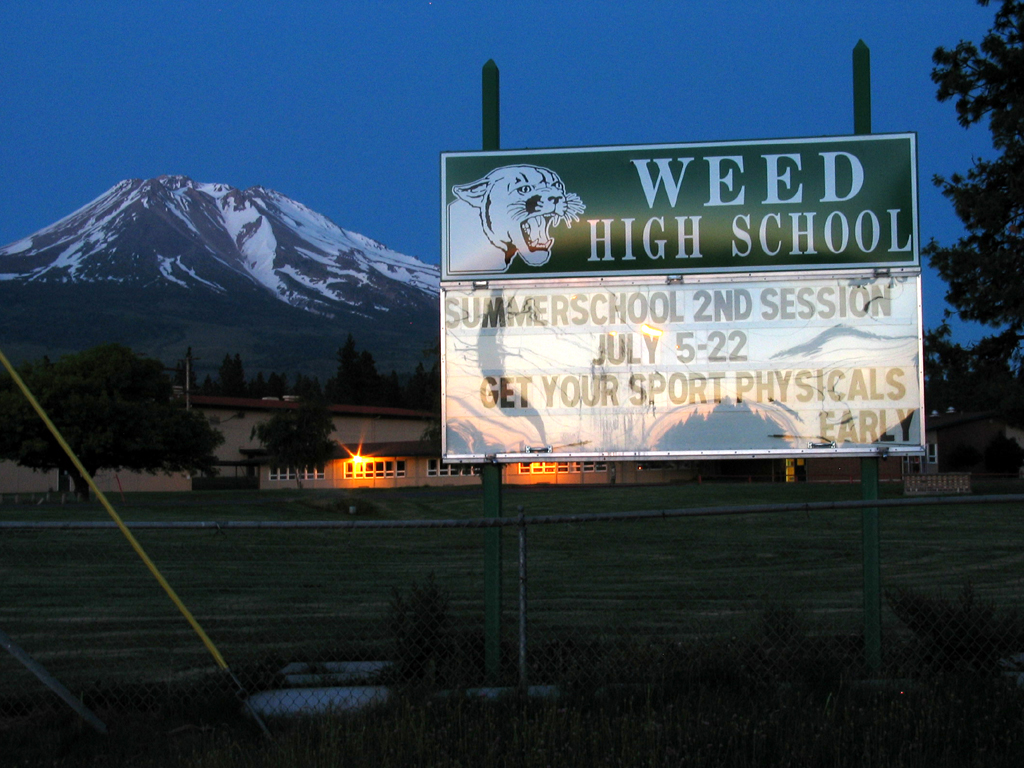
- Weed High School at dusk

Location
- 909 Hillside Drive; Weed, Siskiyou County, California 96094; United States
- Coordinates: 41°25′40″N 122°22′22″W

Information
- Type: Public
- School district: Siskiyou Union High School District
- Superintendent: Marie Caldwell
- Principal: Danielle Dewhurst
- Teaching staff: 13.42 (FTE)
- Grades: 9–12
- Enrollment: 189 (2023–2024)
- Student to teacher ratio: 14.08
- Colors: Green and white
- Athletics conference: CIF Northern Section Shasta Cascade League
- Mascot: Cougar
- Rival: Mt. Shasta High School
- Newspaper: Weed Press
- Website: Weed H.S.

Weed High School is a secondary school located in Weed, California and is part of the Siskiyou Union High School District.

For the 2006–07 school year, the school had student enrollment of 196, an Academic Performance Index (API) of 727 which is equal to the Siskiyou County average API for the same period, and above the CA state average API of 697. The student to teacher ratio was 30:1, and the student to computer ratio was 2:1. The school's racial/ethnic make-up was 40% white/Caucasian, 29% Latino/Hispanic, 31% black/African-American, which is considered quite diverse for a rural school in this geographic area.

== Sports history ==
From 1961 through 1964, the Weed Cougars went undefeated in football. The 1963 team was ranked #1 in northern California by the Sacramento Bee, and later was inducted into the Northern California Sports Hall of Fame.

== Notable people ==
- Charlie Byrd, California's first elected black sheriff
- Mort Kaer, famous athlete in both ventures of the Olympics (participant for the USA in the 1924 Summer games, in the pentathlon, in which he placed fifth) and American football (member of the College Football Hall of Fame for his collegiate career at USC), did not attend Weed as a student, but was head football coach for 28 years, winning 17 conference championships for Weed.
- Aaron Thomas, NFL tight end
