= Mud Creek Glacier =

Glacier in California, United States

- Location within California Location within the United States
- Type: Mountain glacier
- Location: Mount Shasta, Siskiyou County, California, United States
- Coordinates: 41°23′16″N 122°11′29″W
- Terminus: talus
- Status: retreating

The Mud Creek Glacier is the southernmost glacier on Mount Shasta in the U.S. state of California. It lies to the east of Sargents Ridge on Shastarama point near 10,915 feet (3,327 m) above sea level. The glacier is smaller than the northern ones on Mount Shasta such as Whitney, Hotlum, Bolam, and Wintun Glaciers. There are approximately 80 glaciers in California and unlike the glaciers in Alaska, Colorado and Montana. California’s existing glaciers are not remnants of the Pleistocene, but instead relatively young approximately 1,000 years in age. The Mud Creek Glacier is one of at least 7 recognized glaciers on Mt. Shasta by the United States Geological Survey (USGS) the rest being: Whitney, Hotlum, Bolam, Wintun, Konwakiton, and Watkins.

== History ==
In 1871, Clarence King first described the glaciers of Mt. Shasta in a scientific journal he wrote about the Pacific Northwest after summiting Mt. Shasta. In 1936 the USGS was mapping Mt. Shasta disregarding the Mud Creek Glacier along with other smaller glaciers because they were mainly focused on the more prominent glaciers at that time such as the Whitney, Hotlum and Watkins glaciers. There was not a lot of attention given to the smaller glaciers such as Mud Creek Glacier, until 1987. When the USGS was making topographic quads of the Pacific Northwest that it was added to a map of Mt. Shasta and formally recognized as one of Mt. Shasta prominent seven glaciers.

== Geologic features ==
Geomorphic features from glaciation can be observed on Mt. Shasta such as: Cirques, Crevasses, Icefall, Lateral and Terminal Moraines. Below the Mud Creek Glacier is Mud Creek Canyon. This geomorphic feature is a hanging valley carved out of Mt. Shasta's southeast flank as the glacier advanced during its formation approximately 1000 years ago. Here you can view lateral moraines indicating the glaciers advance down the mountain, as well as, terminal moraines that were created due to the glaciers retreat. At the end of the canyon is approximately a 150 foot cascading waterfall called Mud Creek Falls. Mud Creek Falls is one of three cascading waterfalls over geomorphic hanging valley features on Mt. Shasta. The others are Ash Creek Falls and Konwakiton Falls.

== Geologic hazards ==
There are several geological hazards associated with Mud Creek glacier as well as all of Mt. Shasta's glaciers. Because of the loose scree material and rapid melting of the glaciers due to a climatic rise in temperatures of the Pacific Northwest the glaciers are prone to mudflow and landslides. There are records of flood events that were devastating to the local towns as a result of the geologic hazards such as: Weed, McCloud, Dunsmuir, and Shasta. Some of the largest events recorded in history have come from the Mud Creek Glacier. In 2014 part of the Mud Creek Glacier melted causing a massive Mud Flow in Mud Creek moving several thousand tons of rock and debris downstream destroying roads and bridges in its path.

== Recreation ==
Mt. Shasta is also one of California’s most visited mountains for recreation and mountaineering due to it being 14,179 feet above sea level. In order to get to the summit of Mt. Shasta there are several routes mountaineers can take. One of these routes starts at the Crystal Creek trailhead, which leads up Sergeants Ridge where you can observe the Mud Creek Glacier on your trek to the summit crossing over lateral moraines and loose scree composed primarily of Intermediate volcanic igneous rock.

== See also ==
- List of glaciers
