= Watkins Glacier =

Glacier in California, United States

- Location within California Location within the United States
- Type: Mountain glacier
- Location: Siskiyou County, California, United States
- Coordinates: 41°23′57″N 122°10′38″W
- Area: .04 sq mi (0.10 km^{2})
- Length: .2 mi (0.32 km)
- Terminus: Moraine
- Status: Expanding

The Watkins Glacier is a glacier situated on the southeastern flank of Mount Shasta, in the U.S. state of California. It occupies a small cirque in the Clear Creek drainage. It is the smallest officially-named glacier on Mount Shasta, and it was not accorded that status until 1976, following a decades-long campaign by local resident R. Harry Watkins, Jr., to bring recognition to the previously-ignored glacier.

The Watkins is one of three small cirque glaciers on the southern side of Shasta, along with the Konwakiton and Mud Creek Glaciers located about 1 mi (1.6 km) west. It has the lowest average elevation of any of Shasta's glaciers, extending only between 10,400 and 11,000 ft (3,200 and 3,400 m).

In 2002, scientists made the first detailed survey of Mount Shasta's glaciers in 50 years. They found that seven of the glaciers (including the Watkins) have grown over the period 1951–2002, with the Hotlum and Wintun Glaciers nearly doubling, the Bolam Glacier increasing by half, and the Whitney and Konwakiton Glaciers growing by a third.

== See also ==
- List of glaciers
