= Konwakiton Glacier =

Glacier in California, United States

- Location within California
- Type: Mountain glacier
- Location: Siskiyou County, California, United States
- Coordinates: 41°23′59″N 122°11′43″W
- Area: .1 sq mi (0.26 km^{2})
- Length: .4 mi (0.64 km)
- Thickness: 63 ft (19 m) average
- Terminus: Cliffs
- Status: Expanding

The Konwakiton Glacier is a glacier situated on the southern flank of Mount Shasta, in the U.S. state of California. It occupies the head of a large cirque on the south side of Shasta's Misery Hill cone, just northeast of the prominent outcrop of Thumb Rock at about 11,500 ft (3,500 m). It is the fifth largest glacier on Mount Shasta, although less than one-third the size of any of the four larger ones (Whitney, Bolam, Hotlum, and Wintun). The Konwakiton is the most frequently visited of Shasta's glaciers, since the standard climbing route up Avalanche Gulch skirts along its western edge above Thumb Rock saddle, with the boot track often only a few feet (about a meter) from the bergschrund at the glacier's head.

In 2002, scientists made the first detailed survey of Mount Shasta's glaciers in 50 years. They found that seven of the glaciers have grown over the period 1951–2002, with the Hotlum and Wintun Glaciers nearly doubling, the Bolam Glacier increasing by half, and the Whitney and Konwakiton Glaciers growing by a third.

== See also ==
- List of glaciers in the United States
