= California Historical Landmarks in Siskiyou County =

This list includes properties and districts listed on the California Historical Landmark listing in Siskiyou County, California. Click the "Map of all coordinates" link to the right to view a Google map of all properties and districts with latitude and longitude coordinates in the table below.

Image		Landmark name	Location	City or town	Summary
Canby's Cross	110	Canby's Cross	Lava Beds National Monument; 41°49′18″N 121°30′18″W	Tulelake	Coordinates bring visitor to the marker not the actual cross (cross directions on marker)
Captain Jack's Stronghold	9	Captain Jack's Stronghold	Lava Beds National Monument; 41°52′47″N 121°21′56″W	Tulelake	
Emigrant Crossing of present highway	517	Emigrant Crossing of present highway	State Hwy 97 at Military Pass Rd. 41°33′30″N 122°12′35″W	Weed	
Fort Jones	317	Fort Jones	Fort Jones, California; 41°35′44″N 122°50′31″W	Fort Jones	
Guillem's Graveyard	13	Guillem's Graveyard	Lava Beds National Monument; 41°49′27″N 121°33′25″W	Tulelake	
Strawberry Valley Station	396	Strawberry Valley Station	W. Jessie St. and Old Stage Rd. 41°18′32″N 122°19′37″W	Mt. Shasta	
West Miner Street-Third Street Historic District	901	West Miner Street-Third Street Historic District	Historic district 41°43′36″N 122°38′15″W	Yreka	

== See also ==
- List of California Historical Landmarks
- National Register of Historic Places listings in Siskiyou County, California
