= Mount Shasta Union School District =

School district in California, United States

Location
- 595 East Alma St. Mt. Shasta, California 96067 United States

Other information
- Website: www.mountshastausd.com

Mount Shasta Union School District is a public school district in Siskiyou County, California, United States.
