= Guillem's Graveyard =

Historical place in Siskiyou County, United States

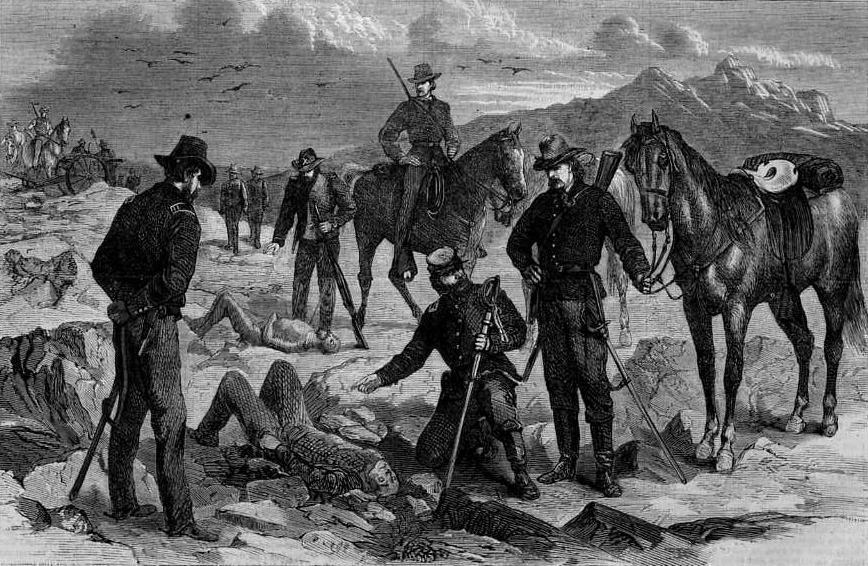
- The Modoc War, Soldiers Recovering the Bodies of the Slain

- Location within California Location within the United States
- 41.8240°N 121.5569°W
- Location: Lava Beds National Monument, Tulelake, California

History
- Built: 1872
- Built for: United States Army

Site notes
- Architect: United States Army
- Architectural style: log cabin
- Governing body: National Park Service

California Historical Landmark
- Designated: June 1, 1932
- Reference no.: 13

Guillem's Graveyard was a United States Army Graveyard built in 1872 for the US troop that were killed in the Modoc War. The Modoc War was fought from 1872 to 1873. Guillem's Graveyard is in Siskiyou County, California. The Guillem's Graveyard is a California Historical Landmark No. 13 listed on June 1, 1932, one of the first California Historical Landmarks. The Guillem's Graveyard was the Military Graveyard of Camp Guillem. Camp Guillem was the U.S. Army command post for the Modoc War around the camp. A small group of Modoc defended their land for almost two years. Knowing the land, they held off troops ten times their size. After six months of sporadic battles and surprise attacks the US Army won, but with about 100 Troops killed and buried at Guillem's Graveyard. At its peak, in spring of 1873, Gillems Camp had 600 troops stationed at the outpost. Many of the Troops were new immigrants. The remote out post was often low on food and medical supplies.

On January 17, 1873, the first two soldiers were buried at Guillem's Graveyard. In April 1873 Guillem's Graveyard official opened and 13 more men were buried that were killed at the battlefield at Hardin Butte. In November, 1875, 50 men bodies were re-interred in a cemetery at Fort Klamath. The other 50 were later re-interred in a cemetery at Fort Klamath or Presidio of San Francisco in 1885, the Graveyard now has no bodies.

A historical marker is at the site of the former Guillem's Graveyard on Hill Road, one mile South of Rim Road, in Lava Beds National Monument. The marker was placed there by National Park Service.

== See also ==
- California Historical Landmarks in Siskiyou County
