= Mount Shasta Ski Park =

Ski area in California, United States

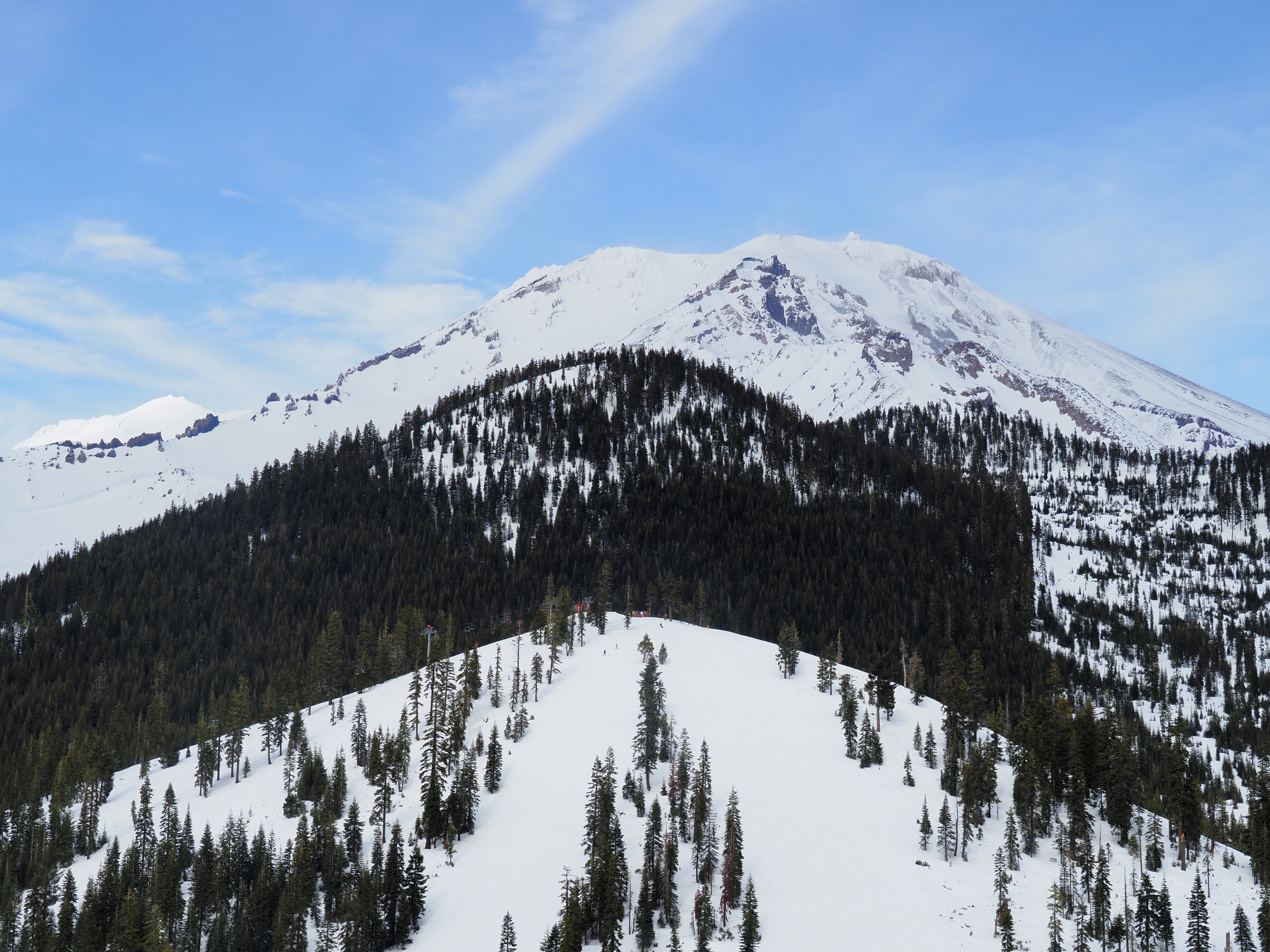
- View of Mount Shasta, from the top of Douglas Butte in Mount Shasta Ski Park.

- Location in California Mount Shasta Ski Park (the United States)
- Location: Mount Shasta, California
- Nearest city: Mount Shasta: 11 miles (18 km); Redding: 63 miles (101 km)
- Coordinates: 41°19′15″N 122°12′14″W
- Top elevation: 7,536 feet (2,297 m)
- Base elevation: 5,500 feet (1,700 m)
- Skiable area: 636 acres (257 ha)
- Trails: 38 total 20% beginner 55% intermediate 25% advanced
- Longest run: 1.25 miles (2.01 km)
- Lift system: 4 chairlifts, 2 moving carpets
- Terrain parks: 2
- Snowfall: 275 in (700 cm)
- Snowmaking: Yes
- Night skiing: Yes
- Website: SkiPark.com

Mount Shasta Ski Park is a ski resort located in northern California which has winter and summer operations. Winter operations include skiing & snowboarding, tubing, a backcountry cabin program, lessons, rentals, and events. In the summer they offer Scenic Chairlift Rides, Mountain Biking, and Disc Golf. They are located east of Interstate 5 along SR 89 between the City of Mount Shasta and the town of McCloud. The ski area lies about 6 mi (9.7 km) south of the summit of 14,179 ft (4,322 m) Mount Shasta, the second highest volcano in the Cascade Range behind Mount Rainier. It straddles several small volcanic buttes on the lower southern flanks of the massive stratovolcano, with 3 triple chairlifts running to the top of Coyote Butte- 6,880 ft (2,100 m), Douglas Butte- 6,600 ft (2,000 m), and Marmot Ridge- 6,150 ft (1,870 m) and 1 Quad chairlift on Grey Butte- 7,536 ft (2,297 m) Along with 2 magic carpets, one for tubing and one for learning to ski and snowboard. With a total skiable area of 636 acres and 38 conventional trails. The total skiable vertical is 1,435 ft (437 m), with 20% of the terrain rated beginner, 55% intermediate, and 25% advanced.

== History ==
The Ski Park was the second ski area constructed on Mount Shasta, but the only one which now survives. The old Mount Shasta Ski Bowl had been built in 1958 in a huge open cirque much higher up on the southern flank of the volcano, with a lodge at 7,800 ft (2,400 m) and lifts topping out above timberline at 9,200 ft (2,800 m). However, the ski area had often been in financial trouble over the next two decades, and a massive avalanche in January 1978 which destroyed the main chairlift was the finishing blow. The Ski Bowl closed permanently after that, and there was no more lift-served skiing on Mount Shasta until 1985, when local businessmen and developers finally began construction of a new ski area lower down on the mountain, in an area well below timberline and safe from avalanches. Starting with Marmot Ridge and Douglas Butte chairlifts. Then in 1996, the Coyote Butte lift was added. The Mt Shasta Ski Park opened on December 14, 1985, and has been successfully operating for 39 years since then. In December 2022 a brand new quad chairlift opened on Grey Butte expanding the park. Adding 7 new runs, including the parks first double diamond run. The ski area is located entirely on 2 sq mi (5.2 km^{2}) double section inholding of private land within the checkerboard pattern of the Shasta-Trinity National Forest, and road access is via Forest Route 88 across national forest land.
