= Shastina =

Satellite cone of Mount Shasta, California, United States

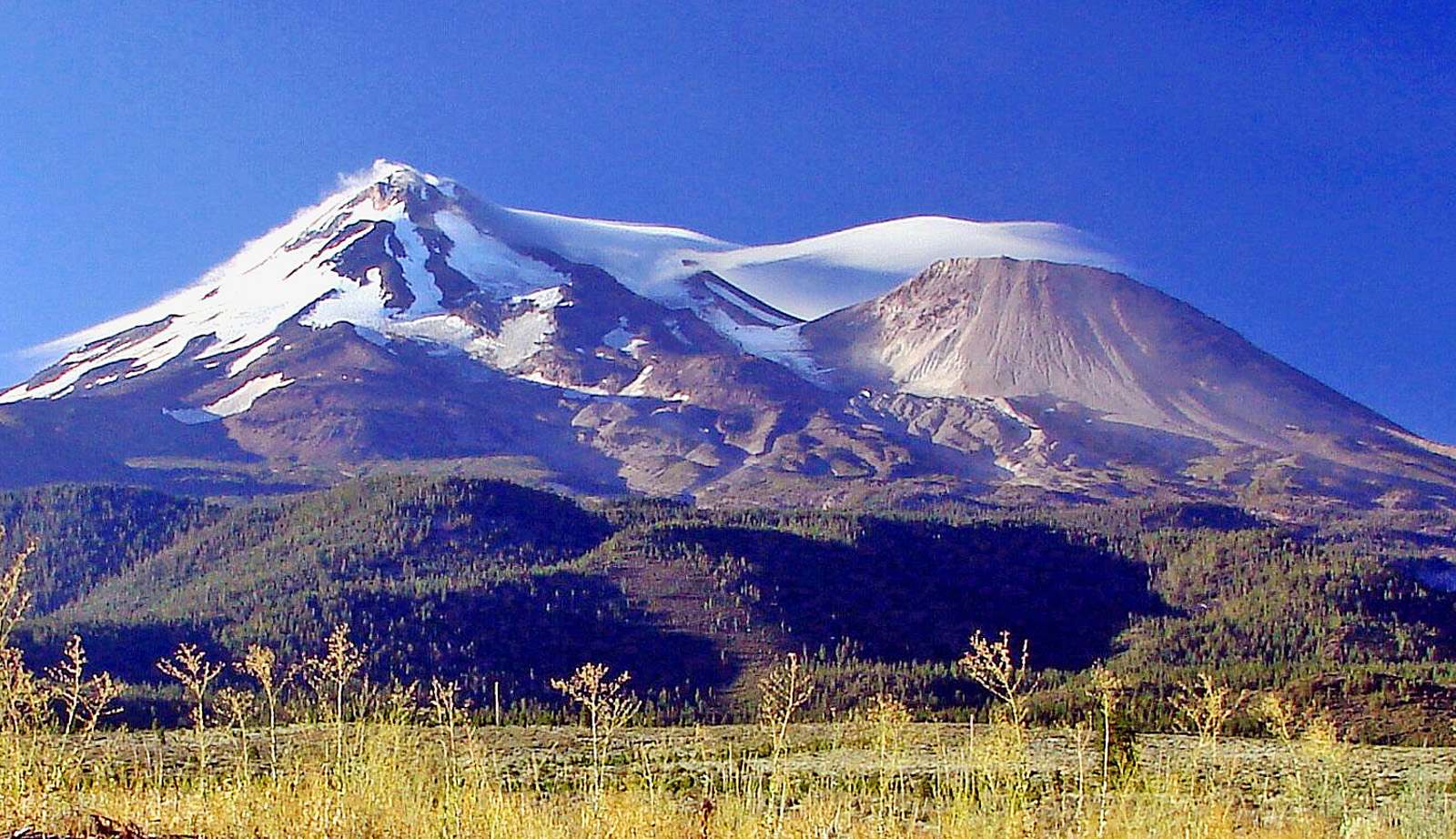
- Shastina is the satellite cone to the right of Mt. Shasta, seen here from the north

Highest point
- Elevation: 12,335 ft (3,760 m) NAVD 88
- Prominence: 450 ft (140 m)
- Coordinates: 41°24′33″N 122°13′25″W

Geography
- Location: Siskiyou County, California, U.S.
- Parent range: Cascade Range
- Topo map: USGS Mount Shasta

Geology
- Mountain type(s): Stratovolcano, satellite cone
- Volcanic arc: Cascade Volcanic Arc
- Last eruption: 7420 BCE ± 300 years

Climbing
- Easiest route: Rock and ice climb

Shastina is a satellite cone of Mount Shasta. It is the second youngest of four overlapping volcanic cones which together form the most voluminous stratovolcano in the Cascade Range. At 12,335 feet (3,760 m), Shastina is taller than Mount Adams and would rank as the third highest volcano in the Cascades behind Mount Rainier and Shasta were it not nestled on the western flank of its higher neighbor. Shastina has a topographic prominence of over 450 ft (137 m) above the saddle connecting it with Shasta and easily exceeds the typical mountaineering standard of 300 feet (91 m) for a peak to qualify as an independent summit, yet most lists of Cascade volcanoes omit it nonetheless. The name "Shastina" is a diminutive of Shasta.

Shastina was formed during a VEI-4 eruption around 7650 BC that also involved activity at the summit of Mount Shasta and the Red Banks on Shasta's south flank.

== Geological features ==
Shastina has the general form of a smooth-sided cone truncated by a one half-mile (0.8 km) diameter summit crater, but with several geological features which make it unique among other volcanoes in the Cascade Volcanic Arc. The most prominent feature when seen from lowland viewpoints is Diller Canyon, a large cleft carved into the western flank by pyroclastic flows and since expanded by erosion. It extends from the crater rim near 12,000 feet (3,660 m) down for over 7,000 vertical feet (2,100 m) towards the town of Weed in the valley below, and is by far the largest such feature found on any of the Cascade volcanoes. Unseen except by mountaineers and fliers are the three small crater lakes nestled among the cones and ridges of the summit crater, which rarely melt free of snow until late summer. Clarence King Lake at 11,755 ft (3,583 m) occupies the center of the crater, while Sisson Lake lies at 11,793 ft (3,595 m) on the eastern side. Highest of all is an unnamed lake at over 11,960 ft (3,645 m) on the south side of the cinder cone which forms Shastina's true summit. These lakes are the highest subaerial lakes in the entire Cascade Range, exceeded only by the subglacial lake beneath the ice of Mount Rainier's summit crater.

== Climate ==
Climate data for Shastina 41.4095 N, 122.2231 W, Elevation: 11,877 ft (3,620 m) (1991–2020 normals)
Month	Jan	Feb	Mar	Apr	May	Jun	Jul	Aug	Sep	Oct	Nov	Dec	Year
Mean daily maximum °F (°C)	25.2 (−3.8)	23.9 (−4.5)	25.1 (−3.8)	28.5 (−1.9)	36.8 (2.7)	45.7 (7.6)	55.7 (13.2)	55.5 (13.1)	50.7 (10.4)	41.3 (5.2)	30.0 (−1.1)	24.8 (−4.0)	36.9 (2.8)
Daily mean °F (°C)	17.3 (−8.2)	15.1 (−9.4)	15.8 (−9.0)	18.2 (−7.7)	25.4 (−3.7)	33.3 (0.7)	41.8 (5.4)	41.4 (5.2)	37.0 (2.8)	29.7 (−1.3)	21.8 (−5.7)	17.3 (−8.2)	26.2 (−3.3)
Mean daily minimum °F (°C)	9.5 (−12.5)	6.3 (−14.3)	6.5 (−14.2)	7.9 (−13.4)	13.9 (−10.1)	20.8 (−6.2)	27.8 (−2.3)	27.2 (−2.7)	23.4 (−4.8)	18.2 (−7.7)	13.6 (−10.2)	9.7 (−12.4)	15.4 (−9.2)
Average precipitation inches (mm)	14.38 (365)	13.45 (342)	13.66 (347)	7.69 (195)	5.74 (146)	2.77 (70)	0.36 (9.1)	0.39 (9.9)	1.33 (34)	5.94 (151)	12.03 (306)	20.07 (510)	97.81 (2,485)
Source: PRISM Climate Group

== Climbing and skiing ==
Shastina is most commonly and easily climbed via the Cascade Gulch route, which ascends from Hidden Valley diagonally up to the Shasta-Shastina saddle, and then continuing up the eastern flank of Shastina's cone to its summit. For most mountaineers, it represents only a quick side trip on the downclimb after summiting Shasta. But for ski mountaineers, Shastina presents a reasonable climb in its own right in return for several exceptional ski descents, including Diller Canyon, the North Face, and the South Face.
