= Mount Shasta City Park =

Park in Mount Shasta, California, US

Coordinates: 41.327°N 122.324°W

Mount Shasta City Park is an urban park located in the city of Mount Shasta, California, United States. It is one of two parks within the Mt. Shasta Recreation and Parks District and hosts the district's headquarters. The 26 acres (11 ha) park and offers a variety of opportunities for recreation such as hiking, picnicking and biking. Many community events occur within the park buildings and in the surrounding park land. The park is also home to the headwaters of the Upper Sacramento River.

== Recreation ==
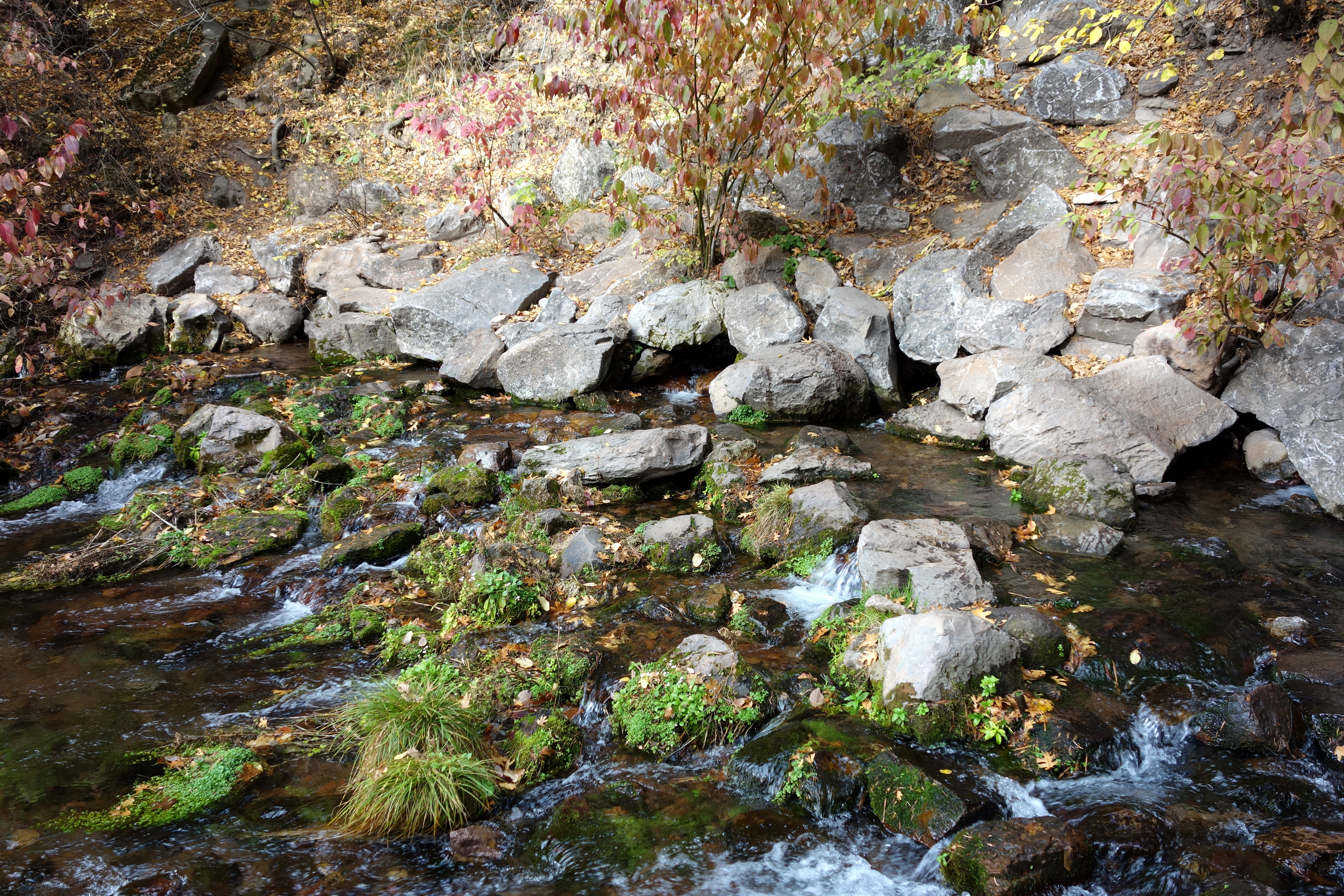
Mount Shasta "Big Springs", headwaters of the Sacramento River.

Mt. Shasta City Park is complete with picnic tables, benches, playground equipment, trails for viewing nature, the Headwaters Bridge, biking trails, a large field, community buildings and the Headwaters Spring. Many of the buildings onsite are available for rental and to host events throughout the year. Upper Lodge Recreation Center features a stage, commercial kitchen, and is capable of seating over 185 people. Overlooking the headwaters spring, Lower Lodge offers similar activities as the Upper Lodge Recreation Center on a smaller scale. The historic Rod and Gun Building is available for rental Spring through Fall, and The Dance Hall offers room for wedding receptions, dances, and is the former home of the Dudes and Daisies Square Dance Club.

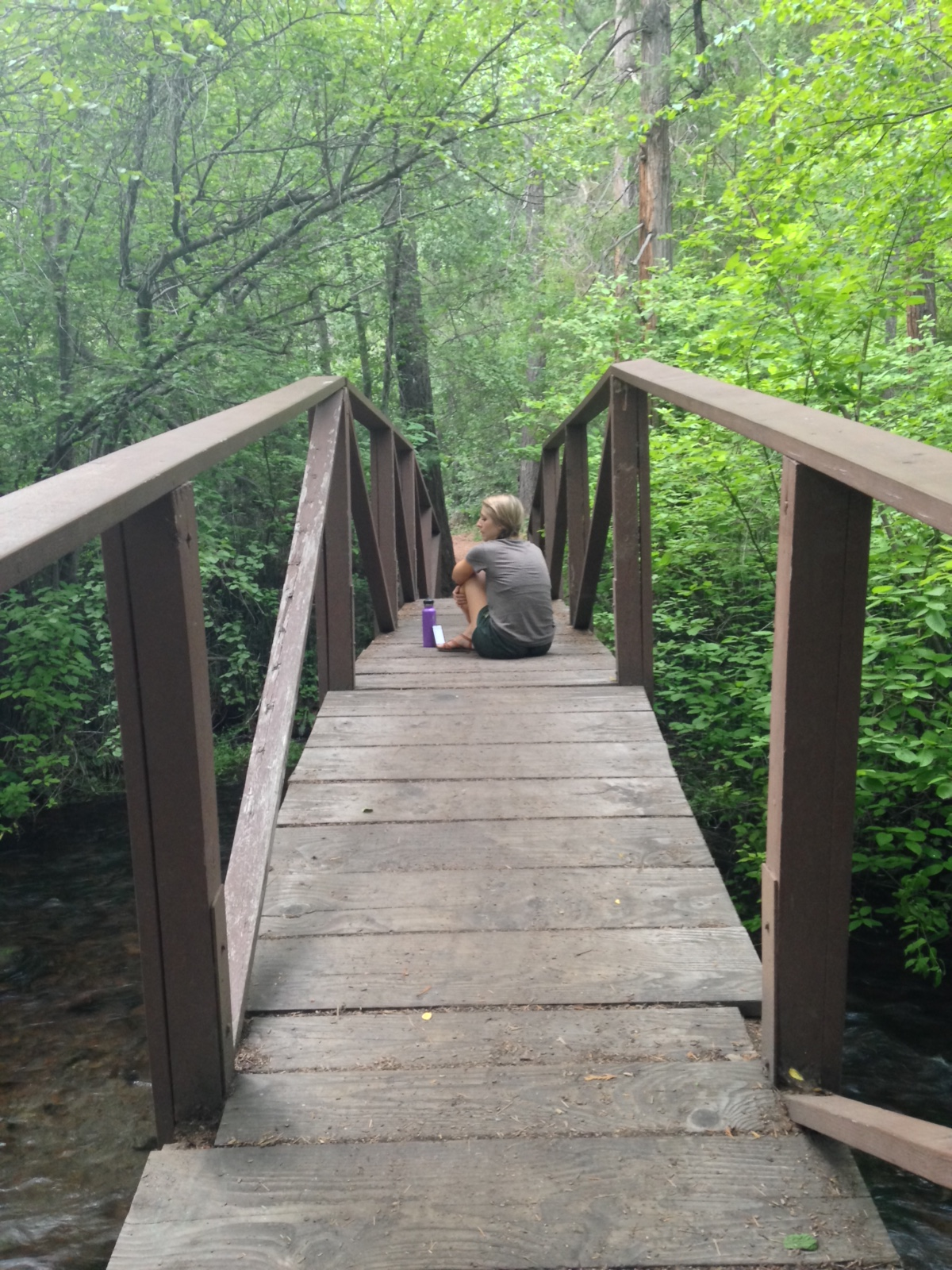
The bridge at Mount Shasta City Park separating the meadow from the hiking trails.

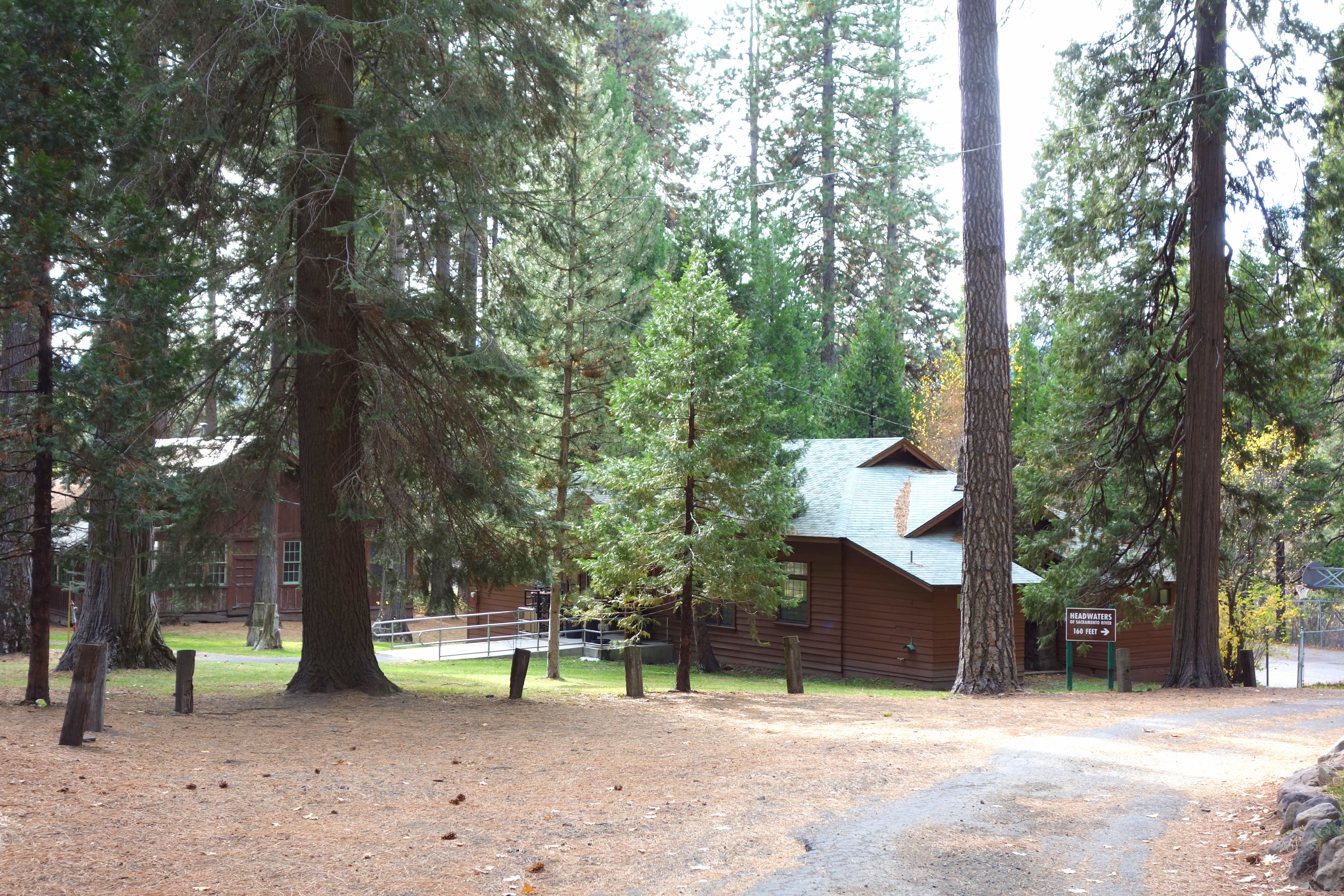
A park building present within Mount Shasta City Park.

Since 1974 the park has offered dinners for senior citizens every Tuesday to Friday as part of the Mt. Shasta Senior Nutrition Program.

== Headwaters of the Sacramento River ==
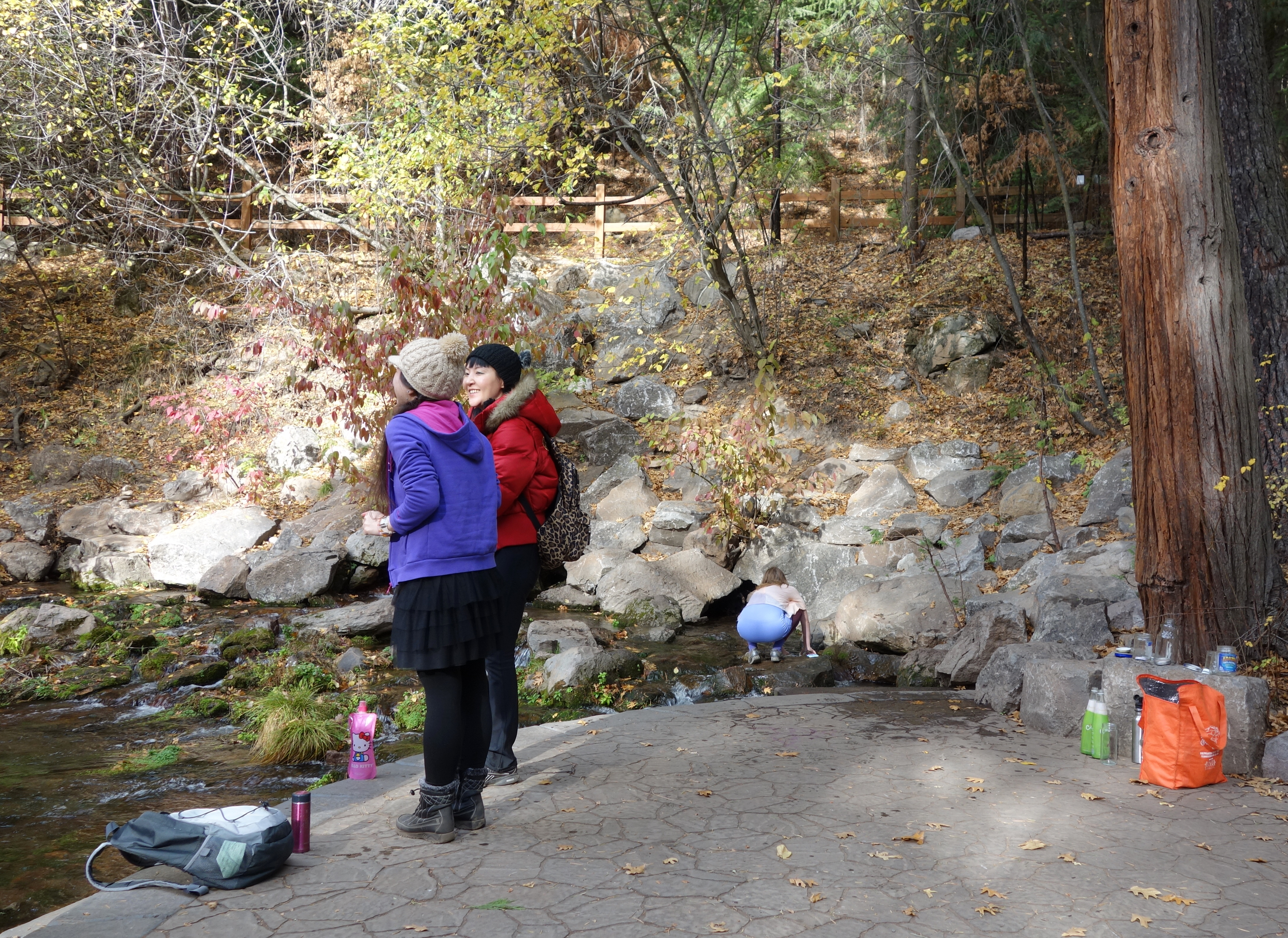
Locals or travelers filling up their water bottles with "Big Springs" water.

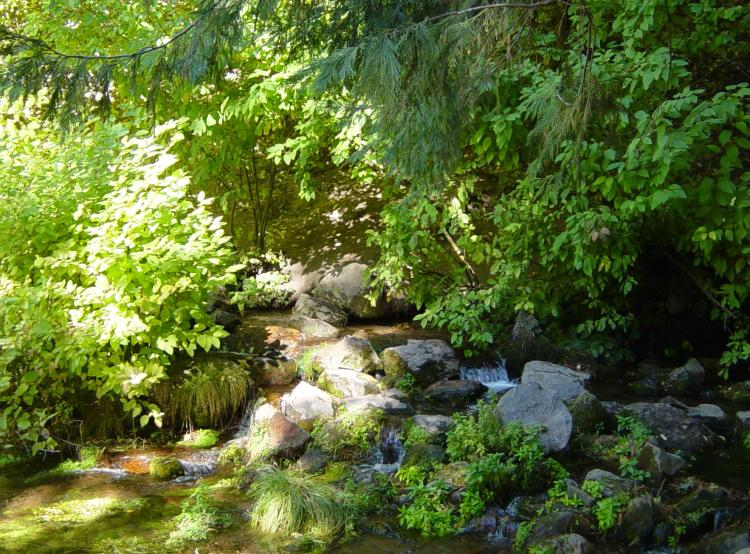
Vegetation and water present at Mount Shasta City Park.

Mount Shasta

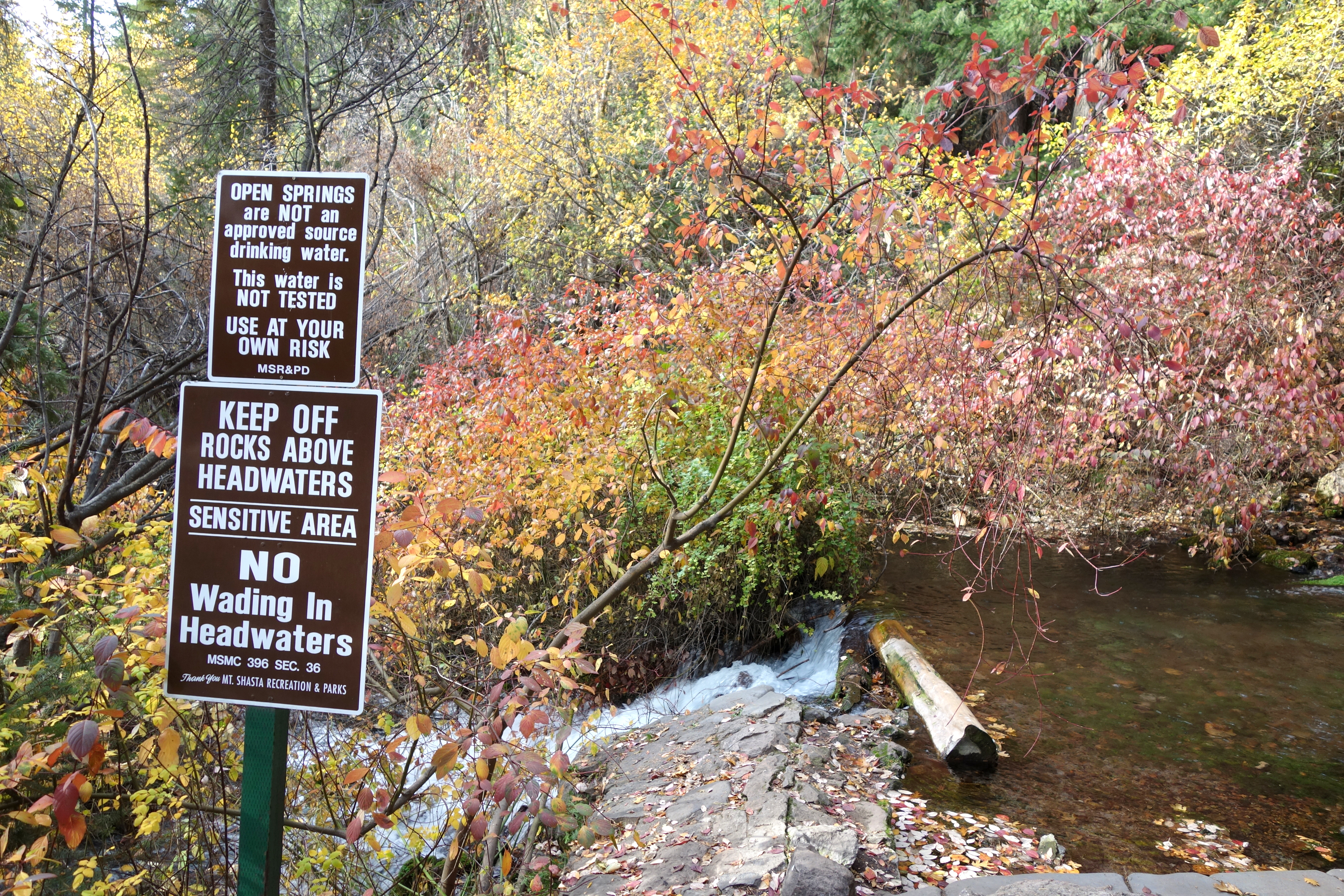
Despite this sign's presence, visitors continue to drink from the springs.

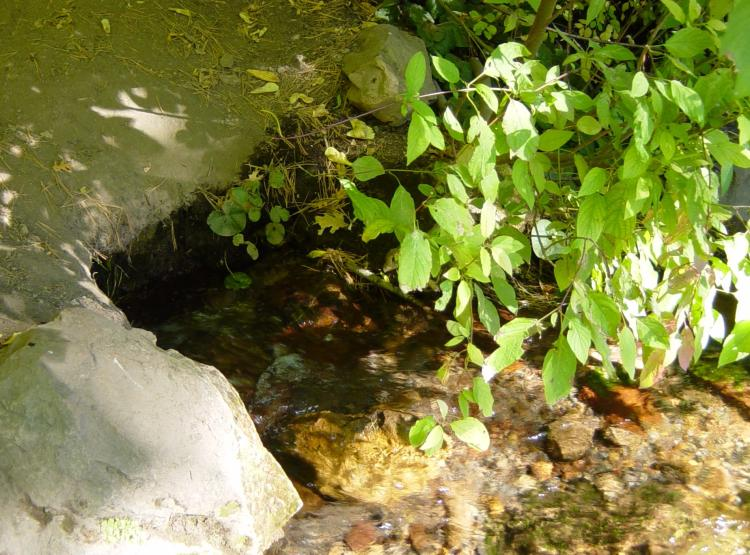
The headwaters of the Sacramento River emerge directly from the side of Big Springs Hill in Mount Shasta City Park.

City Park contains the Big Springs headwaters, a source of water for the Upper Sacramento River. Originally glacial melt, water from Big Springs headwaters emerges directly from the porous rocks in the side of Big Springs Hill after more than 50 years of filtration through volcanic rock. This water comes from Big Springs Aquifer, a volcanic aquifer below the Mount Shasta area. The spring water converges into a shallow pool before cascading downstream into Stream Creek and continuing its journey to the Sacramento River. The "Big Springs" draw both locals and travelers to partake in the virgin drinking water, providing a break from a long journey, a place to meet new people, and to admire the scenery. There is no swimming or wading allowed in the springs or stream.

=== Water Details ===
The Big Springs Aquifer produces about 38 acre-feet of water per day or 12,274,000 gallons per day into the Upper Sacramento River. The water exits from Big Springs Aquifer through the side of Big Springs Hill in Mount Shasta City Park, converges into Spring Creek and through Mount Shasta Fish Hatchery. After, it combines with Wagon Creek, flows into Lake Siskiyou and Box Canyon Dam before entering the Sacramento River. Next, it enters Shasta Lake and continues its journey through the Central Valley Water Project (CVP) systems.

The Upper Sacramento River supplies approximately 15 percent of inflow into Shasta Lake. This water eventually becomes part of the Central Valley Water Project (CVP) and is distributed throughout the Valley and provides habitat for aquatic life.

== History ==
Before Mt. Shasta City Park was developed, the land provided hunting grounds for the Wintun, Okwanuchu, and Maidu Native American tribes until 1841 when foreign explorers encountered the land. In 1901, "Big Springs" was fixed with a water wheel that provided Mt. Shasta City with its first source of energy. It supplied a small amount of electricity used for street lights. From 1920-1943 the park property was used by California State University, Chico, as the summer campus for the Teacher's College. The park buildings still in use today originated from this time. In 1947, California State University, Chico, deeded the park property to Mt. Shasta City and in 2005 the city gave the property to the Mt. Shasta Recreation and Parks District. Originally, the Recreation Center building served as the local National Guard Armory. Today the Recreation Center is used for a variety of community events and programs.

== Water health ==
The water emerging from the Big Springs headwaters emerges from the Big Springs aquifer. The aquifer has a flow rate of 420 L/s an average temperature of 6.8 °C, a pH of 6.71, a siO2 concentration of 53.4 mg/L, Calcium concentrations of 3.7 mg/L of water, and a Mg concentration of 3.18 mg/L.

Locals and travelers visit Mt. Shasta City Park for the "Big Springs" headwaters of the Sacramento River. The water was initially glacial melt that had filtered through volcanic rock slowly over time. Many locals treat the Headwaters as their local hangout spot where neighbors and friends convene to chat while filling up giant containers of water which they will use later for cooking and drinking. Some individuals prefer to use the water from the Headwaters over their own tap or well water. There is a sign on display directly next to the headwaters warning visitors that the water has not been tested and may not be safe to drink, and that no wading is allowed.

== Restoration projects and goals ==
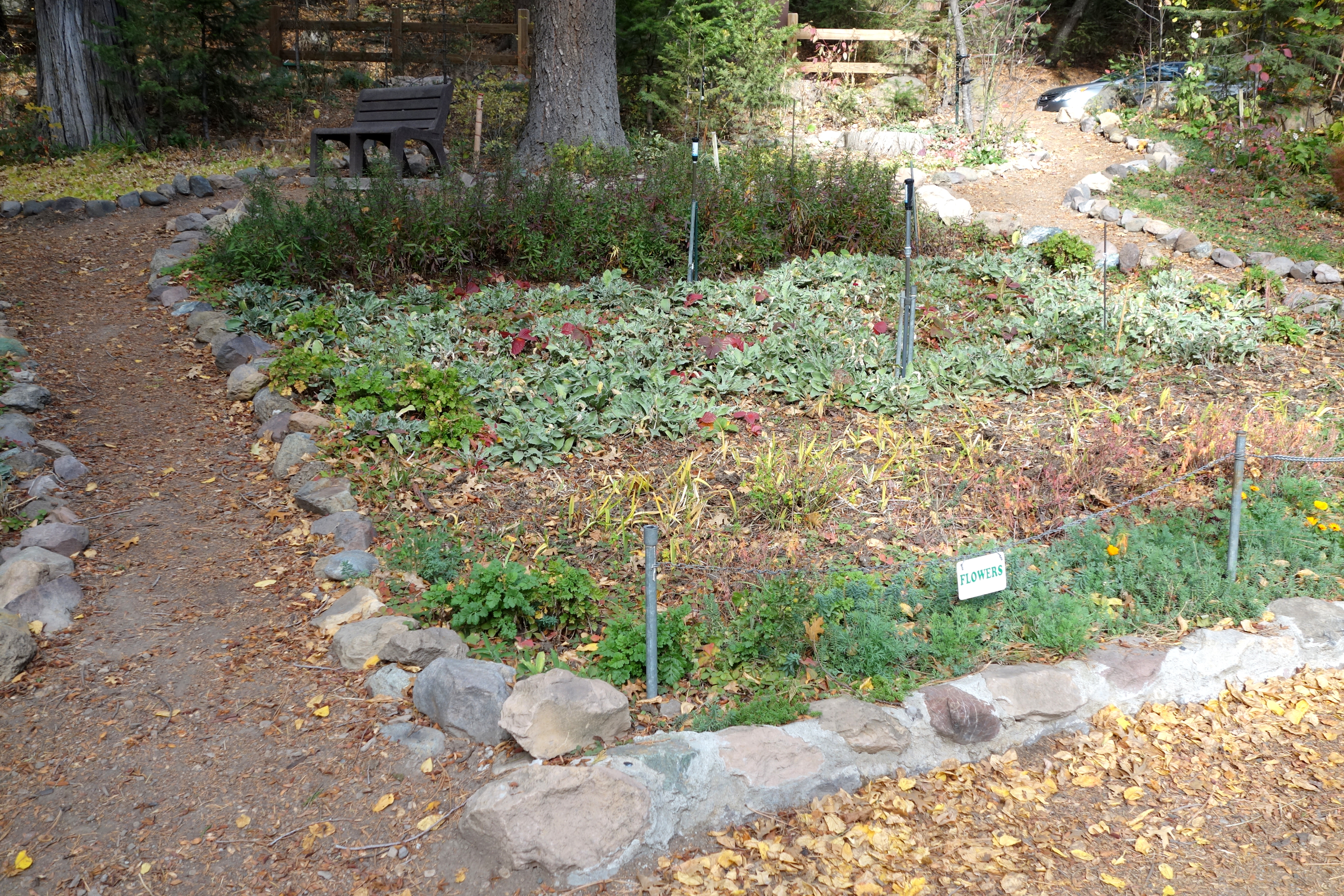
A restoration project occurring at Mount Shasta City Park.

Mt. Shasta Recreation and Parks District has worked to ensure Mt. Shasta City Park is healthy and bountiful. Many varieties of flowers and other vegetation are planted around the park and labeled. There are often flowers in bloom and during the warmer months pollinators like hummingbirds, butterflies, and bees frequent the area. Pedestrian traffic over time raised concerns for the health of the ecosystem around the spring and restoration projects began. In 2007, a non-profit organization known as The River Exchange began to work on Mt Shasta City Park. The addition of a concrete slab next to the spring allows for easier access to the water without having to travel on the rocks within the pool. This project also stabilized the base of Spring Hill to minimize erosion, add more pedestrian access to the park such as small trails that wind through the park, introduced benches and tables, and added more local native plants.

== Water bottling by Crystal Geyser ==
In 2013 Crystal Geyser purchased a water bottling plant across the street from Mount Shasta City Park. They intend to tap into water from the Big Springs aquifer for their water bottling facility. There is some opposition to the water bottling facility tapping into Big Springs Aquifer. The concern over losing this component of local daily lives has resulted in a push to study the water quality and chemistry within the Big Springs aquifer. These locals are hoping to stop the Crystal Geyser facility from using their water source for profit. Before the facility begins production, locals have pushed for an environmental impact report that is scheduled to begin in 2016 and be completed in January 2017. The Crystal Geyser facility intends to dispose of its waste wateronsitee via leeching pools. Citizens have shown concern over this waste water leeching into Big Springs Aquifer. The Crystal Geyser facility is estimated to employ approximately 60 people from the local community, and boost the economy by supplying roughly $40 million to the Siskiyou community annually. Crystal Geyser estimates that the water extracted from Big Springs Aquifer will be approximately 115,000 gallons per day (gpd), which is less than 1% of the aquifer's total output. Although the Sustainable Groundwater Management Act (SGMA) addresses potential groundwater overdraft in California, it only covers alluvial basins and does not include volcanic basins such as the Big Springs Aquifer.
