= Mount Shasta =

Stratovolcano in California, United States

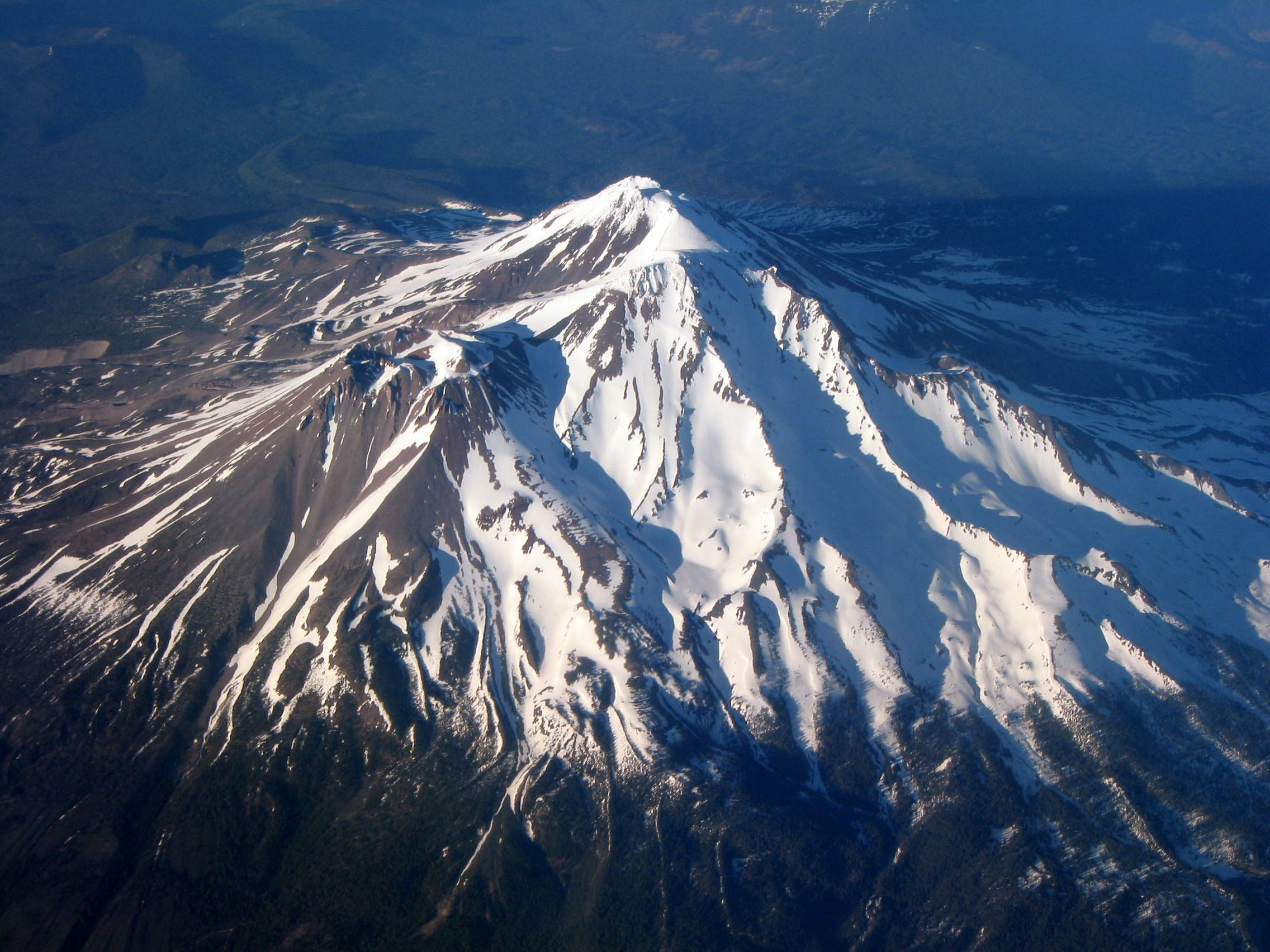
- Aerial view of Mount Shasta from the southwest

Highest point
- Elevation: 14,179 ft (4,322 m); NAVD88
- Prominence: 9,772 ft (2,979 m)
- Parent peak: North Palisade
- Isolation: 335 mi (539 km)
- Listing: World most prominent peaks 96th; North America highest peaks 48th; North America prominent peak 18th; US most prominent peaks 11th; North America isolated peaks 28th; US highest major peaks 34th; California highest major peaks 5th; California fourteeners 5th; California county high points 5th
- Coordinates: 41°24′33″N 122°11′42″W

Naming
- Native name: Waka-nunee-Tuki-wuki (Shasta); Úytaahkoo (Karok)

Geography
- Location within California Location within the United States
- Location: Shasta–Trinity National Forest, California, U.S.
- Parent range: Cascade Range
- Topo map: USGS Mount Shasta

Geology
- Formed by: Subduction zone volcanism
- Rock age: About 593,000 years
- Mountain type: Stratovolcano
- Volcanic arc: Cascade Volcanic Arc
- Last eruption: 1250

Climbing
- First ascent: 1854 by E. D. Pearce and party
- Easiest route: Avalanche Gulch ("John Muir") route: talus/snow climb

U.S. National Natural Landmark
- Designated: 1976

Mount Shasta (/ˈʃæstə/ SHASS-tə; Shasta: Waka-nunee-Tuki-wuki; Karuk: Úytaahkoo) is a potentially active stratovolcano at the southern end of the Cascade Range in Siskiyou County, California. At an elevation of 14,179 ft (4,322 m), it is the second-highest peak in the Cascades and the fifth-highest in the state. Mount Shasta has an estimated volume of 85 cubic miles (350 cubic kilometers), which makes it the most voluminous stratovolcano in the Cascade Volcanic Arc. The mountain and surrounding area are part of the Shasta–Trinity National Forest.

Shasta receives heavy winter snowfall, and hosts the Mount Shasta Ski Park. Seven glaciers ring the slopes. It holds cultural significance for the Klamath Tribes, and religious significance for the Wintu. The mountain was first summited in 1854. Shasta is close to Weed, California, Interstate 5, and the Central Oregon and Pacific Railroad.

Shasta's last major eruption was 3,000 years ago, but minor eruptions have occurred as recently as 200 years ago. At least 70 lahars have been recorded in the last 1,000 years. The volcano has a 3.5% chance of erupting by 2049. A modern eruption would create lahars, and likely damage key transportation and water infrastructure. The USGS considers Shasta a very high threat volcano.

== Description ==
Topographic 3D model of Mount Shasta and its prominent satellite cone Shastina, demonstrating the mountain's complex overlapping volcanic structure.

The origin of the name "Shasta" is vague, either derived from a people of a name like it or otherwise garbled by early Westerners. Mount Shasta is connected to its satellite cone of Shastina, and together they dominate the landscape. Shasta rises abruptly to tower nearly 9,761 feet (3,000 m) above its surroundings. On a clear winter day, the mountain can be seen from the floor of the Central Valley 140 miles (230 km) to the south. The mountain has attracted the attention of poets, authors, and presidents.

The mountain consists of four overlapping dormant volcanic cones that have built a complex shape, including the main summit and the prominent and visibly conical satellite cone of 12,330 ft (3,760 m) Shastina. If Shastina were a separate mountain, it would rank as the fourth-highest peak of the Cascade Range (after Mount Rainier, Rainier's Liberty Cap, and Mount Shasta itself).

Mount Shasta's surface is relatively free of deep glacial erosion except, paradoxically, for its south side where Sargents Ridge runs parallel to the U-shaped Avalanche Gulch. This is the largest glacial valley on the volcano, although it does not now have a glacier in it. There are seven named glaciers on Mount Shasta, with the four largest (Whitney, Bolam, Hotlum, and Wintun) radiating down from high on the main summit cone to below 10,000 ft (3,000 m) primarily on the north and east sides. The Whitney Glacier is the longest, and the Hotlum is the most voluminous glacier in the state of California. Three of the smaller named glaciers occupy cirques near and above 11,000 ft (3,400 m) on the south and southeast sides, including the Watkins, Konwakiton, and Mud Creek glaciers.

== History ==
The first written record and description was made on May 20, 1817, by Spaniard Narciso Durán, a member of the Luis Antonio Argüello expedition into the upper areas of the Sacramento River Valley, who wrote "At about ten leagues to the northwest of this place we saw the very high hill called by soldiers that went near its slope Jesus Maria, It is entirely covered with snow." Peter Skene Ogden (a leader of a Hudson's Bay Company trapping brigade) in 1826 recorded sighting the mountain, and in 1827, the name "Sasty" or "Sastise" was given to nearby Mount McLoughlin by Ogden. An 1839 map by David Burr lists the mountain as Rogers Peak. This name was apparently dropped, and the name Shasta was transferred to present-day Mount Shasta in 1841, partly as a result of work by the United States Exploring Expedition.

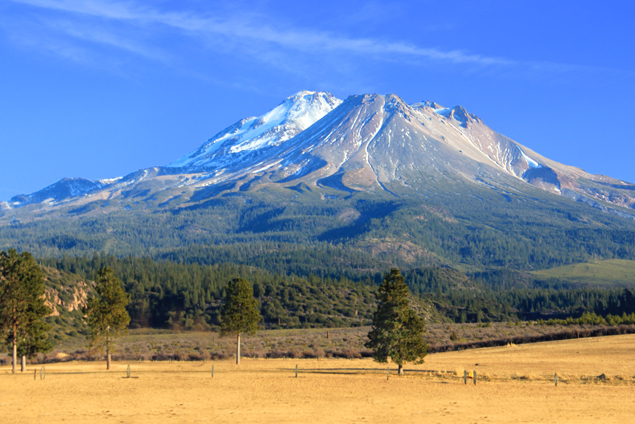
Mount Shasta seen from south of Weed, California

Beginning in the 1820s, Mount Shasta was a prominent landmark along what became known as the Siskiyou Trail, which runs at Mount Shasta's base. The Siskiyou Trail was on the track of an ancient trade and travel route of Native American footpaths between California's Central Valley and the Pacific Northwest.

The California Gold Rush brought the first Euro-American settlements into the area in the early 1850s, including at Yreka, California and Upper Soda Springs. The first recorded ascent of Mount Shasta occurred in 1854 (by Elias Pearce), after several earlier failed attempts. In 1856, the first women (Harriette Eddy, Mary Campbell McCloud, and their party) reached the summit.

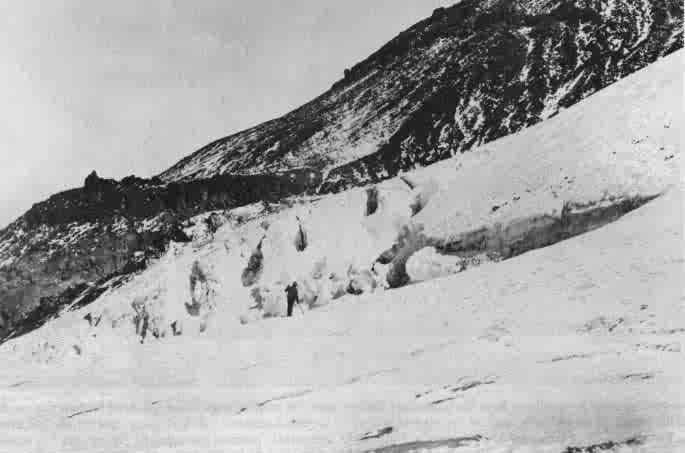
Clarence King exploring the Whitney Glacier in 1870

By the 1860s and 1870s, Mount Shasta was the subject of scientific and literary interest. In 1854 John Rollin Ridge titled a poem "Mount Shasta." A book by California pioneer and entrepreneur James Hutchings, titled Scenes of Wonder and Curiosity in California, contained an account of an early summit trip in 1855. The summit was achieved (or nearly so) by John Muir, Josiah Whitney, Clarence King, and John Wesley Powell. In 1877, Muir wrote a dramatic popular article about his surviving an overnight blizzard on Mount Shasta by lying in the hot sulfur springs near the summit. This experience was inspiration to Kim Stanley Robinson's short story "Muir on Shasta".

The 1887 completion of the Central Pacific Railroad, built along the line of the Siskiyou Trail between California and Oregon, brought a substantial increase in tourism, lumbering, and population into the area around Mount Shasta. Early resorts and hotels, such as Shasta Springs and Upper Soda Springs, grew up along the Siskiyou Trail around Mount Shasta, catering to these early adventuresome tourists and mountaineers.

In the early 20th century, the Pacific Highway followed the track of the Siskiyou Trail to the base of Mount Shasta, leading to still more access to the mountain. Today's version of the Siskiyou Trail, Interstate 5, brings thousands of people each year to Mount Shasta.

From February 13–19, 1959, the Mount Shasta Ski Bowl obtained the record for the most snowfall during one storm in the U.S., with a total of 15.75 feet (480 cm).

Mount Shasta was declared a National Natural Landmark in December 1976.

In January 1995, with the snow depth at a 20-year high, a snowstorm resulted in 2 feet of new snow in 24 hours, followed by rain, which caused a massive, heavy snow slab to release. The avalanche initiated at 11–12,000 feet, plunging south down Avalanche Gulch to 7500 feet, carving a 300-foot-wide, 40-foot-deep path destroying 300-year-old growth forest. It was described as a 300–500 year event. During the same time period other large avalanches occurred on the mountain including: a very large avalanche that scoured the slopes of Shastina, leaving six distinct paths through old growth forest; an avalanche that decimated a grove of large, old-growth Whitebark Pines at North Gate.

=== Legends ===
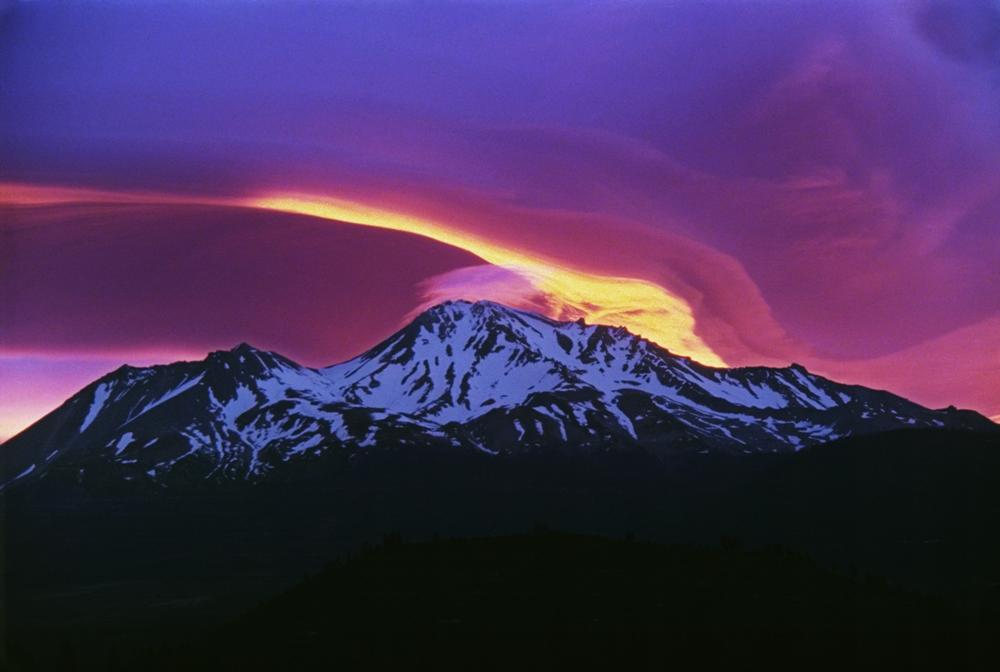
Sunrise over Mount Shasta

The lore of some of the Klamath Tribes in the area held that Mount Shasta is inhabited by the Spirit of the Above-World, Skell, who descended from heaven to the mountain's summit at the request of a Klamath chief. Skell fought with Spirit of the Below-World, Llao, who resided at Mount Mazama, by throwing hot rocks and lava, probably representing the volcanic eruptions at both mountains.

Italian settlers arrived in the early 1900s to work in the mills as stonemasons and established a strong Catholic presence in the area. There are many religious sites in the area; Mount Shasta City and Dunsmuir, California, small towns near Shasta's western base, are focal points for many of these, which range from a Buddhist monastery (Shasta Abbey, founded by Houn Jiyu-Kennett in 1971) to modern-day Native American rituals. A group of Wintu Native Americans from the McCloud River area practice rituals on the mountain.

Mount Shasta has also been a focus for non-Native American legends, centered on a hidden city of advanced beings from the lost continent of Lemuria. The legend grew from an offhand mention of Lemuria in the 1880s to a description of a hidden Lemurian village in 1925. In 1931 Harvey Spencer Lewis, using the pseudonym Wishar S[penle] Cerve, wrote Lemuria: The Lost Continent of the Pacific, published by AMORC, about the hidden Lemurians of Mount Shasta, which cemented the legend in many readers' minds. A 1941 novella by Robert A. Heinlein, Lost Legacy, drew on these legends and portrayed the mountain as the home of a community of peaceful and powerful "adepts" who had the goal of advancing the human race.

In 2024 a 20-foot bronze statue of the Virgin Mary was built in the Ski Park in memory of Ray Merlo, husband and business partner of the Ski Park's owner, Robin Merlo. Ray Merlo had died from cancer in 2020.

== Climate ==
While regular snowfall measurements are rare for the Mount Shasta's slopes, snowpack and water content records have been compiled regularly and it is estimated that around timberline it receives an average of 450-500 inches of snow each winter. Shasta usually does not receive as much snowfall as some other Cascade Volcanoes (such a Rainier, Baker and Lassen) due to its location in the rain shadow of the Klamath Mountains, which reach over 9000 ft and are directly to the west and southwest, right in the main storm track.

Climate data for Mount Shasta 41.4096 N, 122.2001 W, Elevation: 13,396 ft (4,083 m) (1991–2020 normals)
Month	Jan	Feb	Mar	Apr	May	Jun	Jul	Aug	Sep	Oct	Nov	Dec	Year
Mean daily maximum °F (°C)	9.5 (−12.5)	12.2 (−11.0)	16.5 (−8.6)	23.8 (−4.6)	32.1 (0.1)	41.0 (5.0)	49.6 (9.8)	49.4 (9.7)	43.9 (6.6)	30.8 (−0.7)	15.7 (−9.1)	8.4 (−13.1)	27.7 (−2.4)
Mean daily minimum °F (°C)	−10.2 (−23.4)	−8.0 (−22.2)	−6.3 (−21.3)	−2.4 (−19.1)	4.6 (−15.2)	11.5 (−11.4)	18.1 (−7.7)	16.5 (−8.6)	8.9 (−12.8)	1.9 (−16.7)	−4.7 (−20.4)	−9.6 (−23.1)	1.7 (−16.8)
Average precipitation inches (mm)	13.12 (333)	13.3 (340)	14.48 (368)	7.25 (184)	5.45 (138)	3.56 (90)	0.55 (14)	0.42 (11)	1.66 (42)	10.14 (258)	18.31 (465)	30.21 (767)	118.45 (3,010)
Source: PRISM Climate Group

== Geology ==
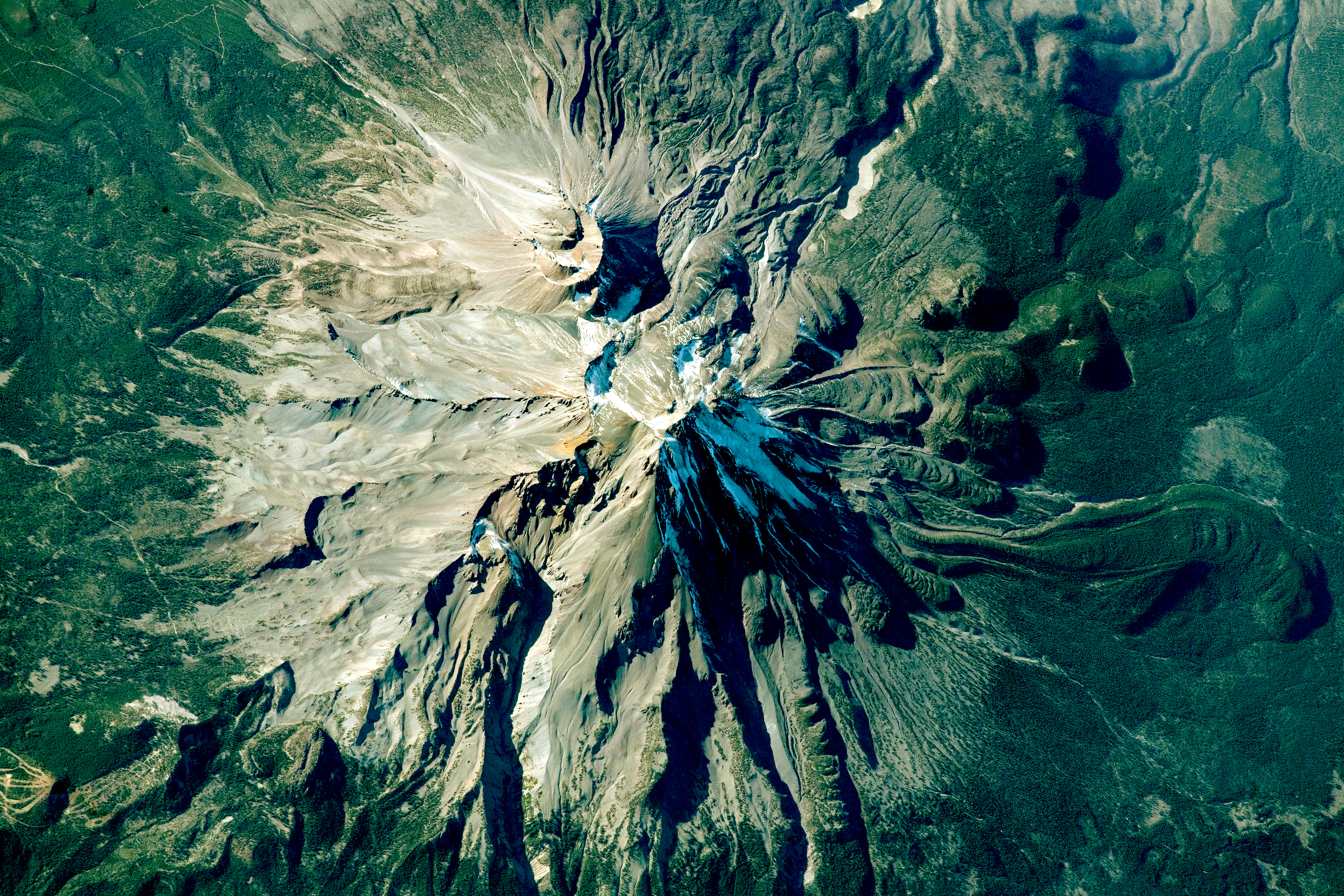
Mount Shasta photographed by a crew member during the International Space Station's 68th expedition, in October 2022

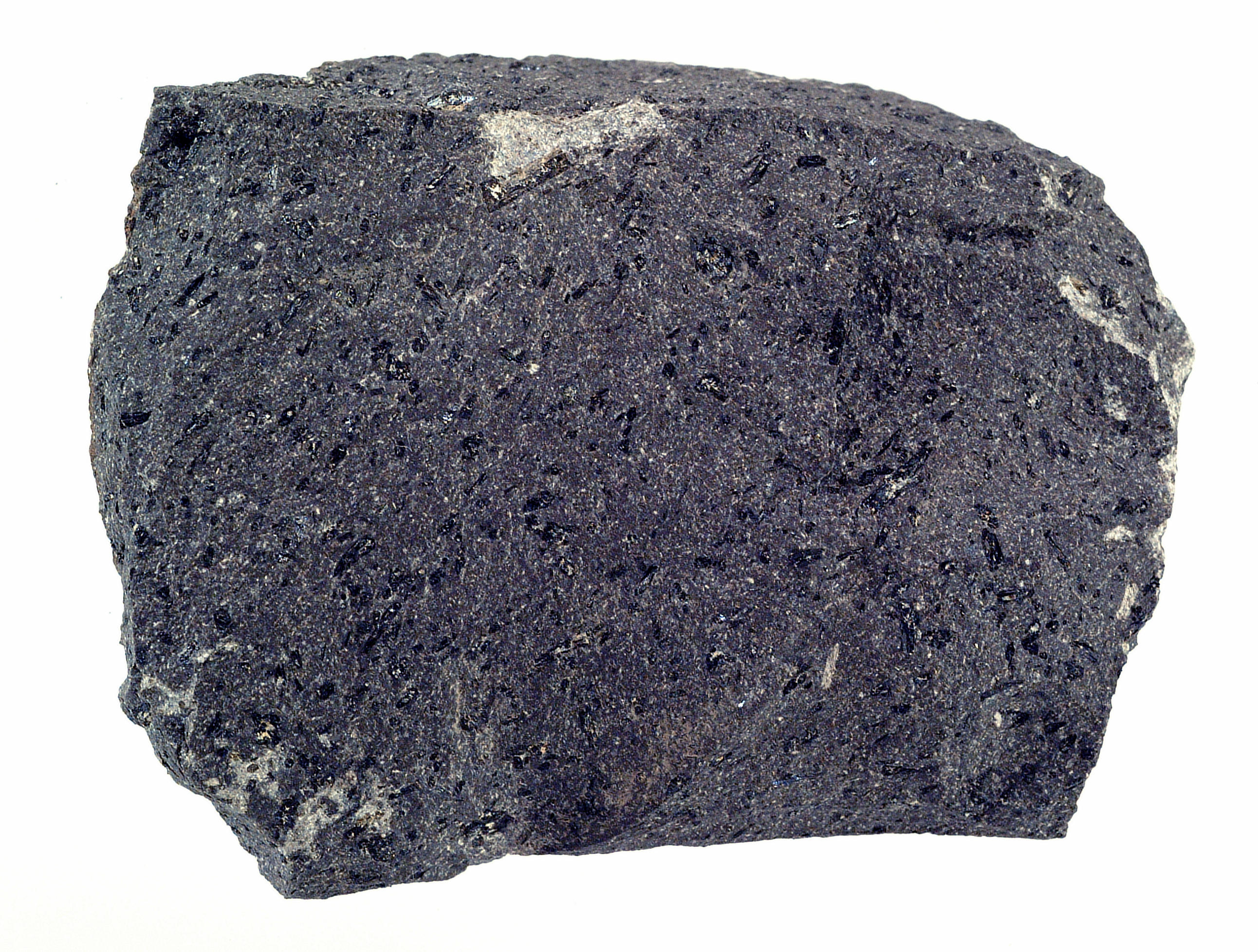
Andesite lava, about 4 in (10 cm) across, that was erupted at Mount Shasta

About 593,000 years ago, andesitic lavas erupted in what is now Mount Shasta's western flank near McBride Spring. Over time, an ancestral Mount Shasta stratovolcano was built to a large but unknown height; sometime between 300,000 and 360,000 years ago the entire north side of the volcano collapsed, creating an enormous landslide or debris avalanche, 6.5 mi^{3} (27 km^{3}) in volume. The slide flowed northwestward into Shasta Valley, where the Shasta River now cuts through the 28-mile-long (45 km) flow.

What remains of the oldest of Mount Shasta's four cones is exposed at Sargents Ridge on the south side of the mountain. Lavas from the Sargents Ridge vent cover the Everitt Hill shield at Mount Shasta's southern foot. The last lavas to erupt from the vent were hornblende-pyroxene andesites with a hornblende dacite dome at its summit. Glacial erosion has since modified its shape.

The next cone to form is exposed south of Mount Shasta's current summit and is called Misery Hill. It was formed 15,000 to 20,000 years ago from pyroxene andesite flows and has since been intruded by a hornblende dacite dome.

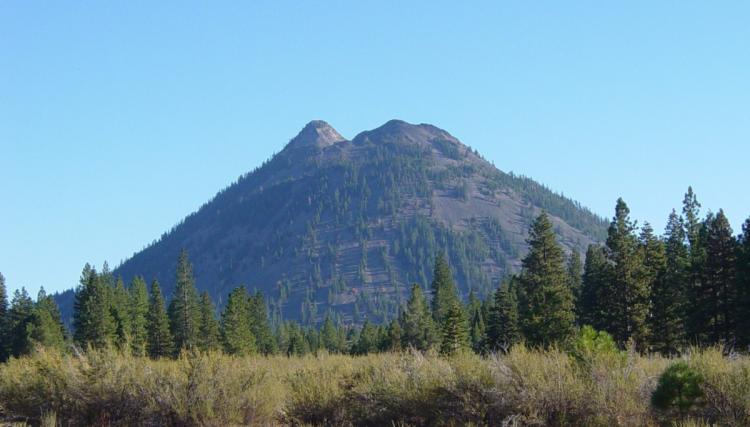
Nearby Black Butte, seen from Weed, California

There are many buried glacial scars on the mountain that were created in recent glacial periods ("ice ages") of the present Wisconsinian glaciation. Most have since been filled in with andesite lava, pyroclastic flows, and talus from lava domes. Shastina, by comparison, has a fully intact summit crater indicating Shastina developed after the last ice age. Shastina has been built by mostly pyroxene andesite lava flows. Some 9,500 years ago, these flows reached about 6.8 mi (10.9 km) south and 3 mi (4.8 km) north of the area now occupied by nearby Black Butte. The last eruptions formed Shastina's present summit about a hundred years later. But before that, Shastina, along with the then forming Black Butte dacite plug dome complex to the west, created numerous pyroclastic flows that covered 43 mi^{2} (110 km^{2}), including large parts of what is now Mount Shasta, California and Weed, California. Diller Canyon (400 ft or 120 m deep and 0.25 mi or 400 m wide) is an avalanche chute that was probably carved into Shastina's western face by these flows.

The last to form, and the highest cone, the Hotlum Cone, formed about 8,000 years ago. It is named after the Hotlum glacier on its northern face; its longest lava flow, the 500-foot-thick (150 m) Military Pass flow, extends 5.5 mi (8.9 km) down its northeast face. Since the creation of the Hotlum Cone, a dacite dome intruded the cone and now forms the summit. The rock at the 600-foot-wide (180 m) summit crater has been extensively hydrothermally altered by sulfurous hot springs and fumaroles there (only a few examples still remain).

In the last 8,000 years, the Hotlum Cone has erupted at least eight or nine times. The last major, well-document eruption, occurred 3,000 years ago, though periodic minor eruptions have occurred since. About 200 years ago, the last significant Mount Shasta eruption came from that cone and created a pyroclastic flow, a hot lahar (mudflow), and three cold lahars, which streamed 7.5 mi (12.1 km) down Mount Shasta's east flank via Ash Creek. A separate hot lahar went 12 mi (19 km) down Mud Creek. This eruption was thought to have been observed by the explorer La Pérouse, from his ship off the California coast, in 1786, but this has been disputed. At least 70 lahars occurred in the last thousand years.

=== Volcanic status ===
During the last 10,000 years, Mount Shasta has erupted an average of every 800 years, but in the past 4,500 years the volcano has erupted an average of every 600 years.

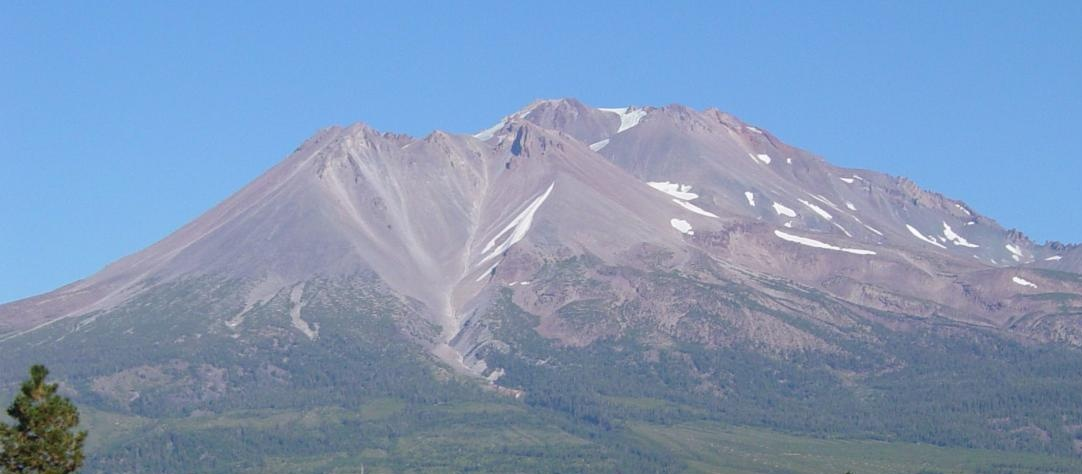
Diller Canyon on Shastina from Weed

USGS seismometers and GPS receivers operated by UNAVCO form the monitoring network for Mount Shasta. The volcano has been relatively quiet during the 21st century, with only a handful of small magnitude earthquakes and no demonstrable ground deformation. Although geophysically quiet, periodic geochemical surveys indicate that volcanic gas emanates from a fumarole at the summit of Mount Shasta from a deep-seated reservoir of partly molten rock.

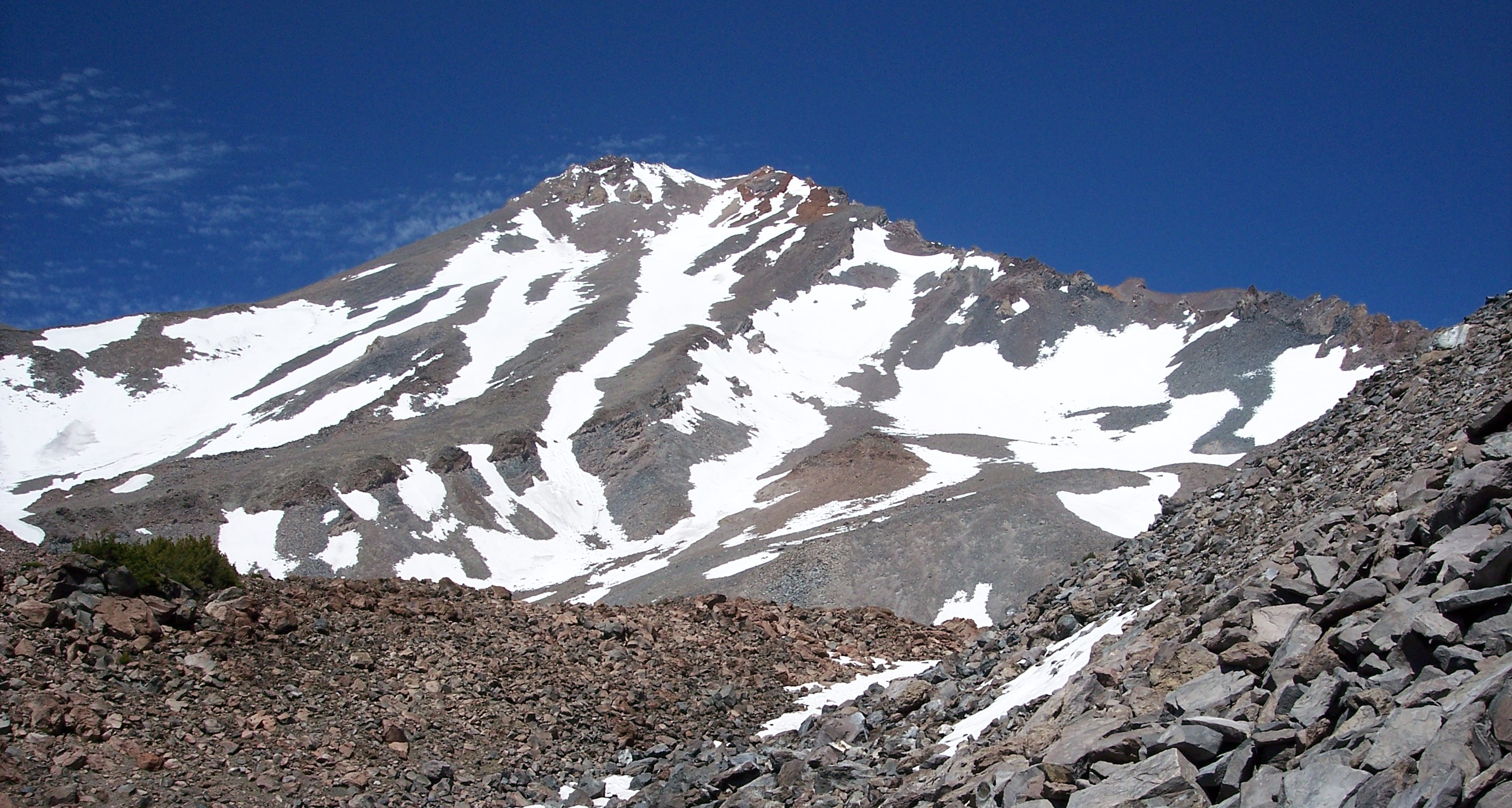
Mount Shasta's west face as seen from Hidden Valley high on the mountain. The west face gulley is an alternate climbing route to the summit.

Mount Shasta can release volcanic ash, pyroclastic flows or dacite and andesite lava. Its deposits can be detected under nearby small towns. Mount Shasta has an explosive, eruptive history. There are fumaroles on the mountain, which show Mount Shasta is still alive.

The worst-case scenario for an eruption is a large pyroclastic flow, similar to that which occurred in the 1980 eruption of Mount St. Helens. Since there is ice, such as Whitney Glacier and Mud Creek Glacier, lahars would also result. Lahars would pose a risk to the Sacramento River, McCloud River, and Shasta Lake, as well as in the direction of Yreka, California. Major highways, including Interstate 5, would be directly affected by a major eruption. Several railroads, including the McCloud Railway, and Union Pacific owned tracks, would be affected. Ash fall could divert up to 400 flights a day.

The United States Geological Survey monitors Mount Shasta and rates it as a very high-threat volcano. A 2019 report concluded there was a 3.5% chance of eruption by 2049.

== Climbing ==
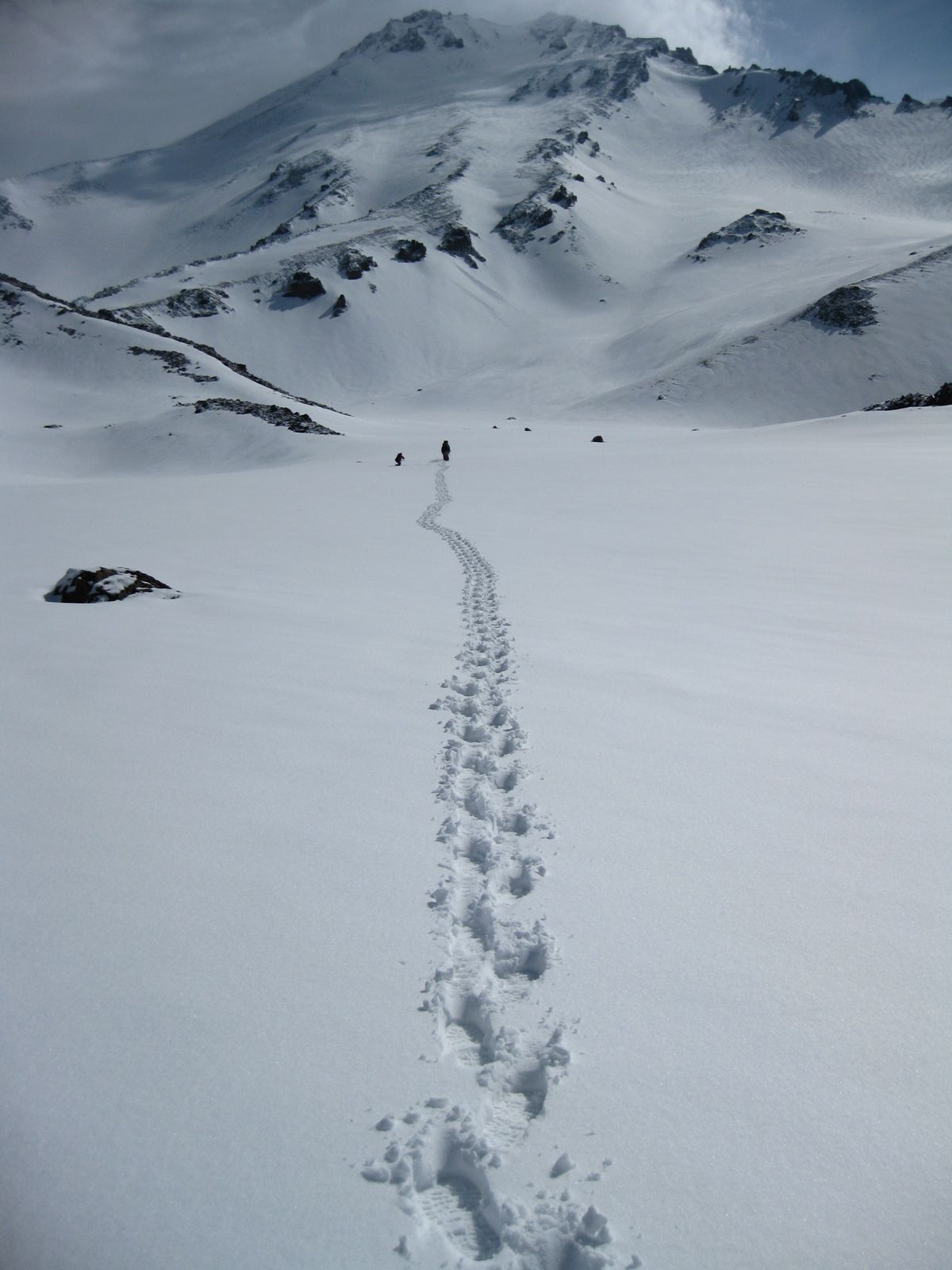
Mount Shasta's west face, June 2009

The summer climbing season runs from late April until October, although many attempts are made in the winter. Mount Shasta is also a popular destination for backcountry skiing. Many of the climbing routes can be descended by experienced skiers, and there are numerous lower-angled areas around the base of the mountain.

No quota system currently exists for climbing Mount Shasta, and reservations are not required. However, climbers must obtain a summit pass and a wilderness permit to climb the mountain.

In a typical season there are 1–3 climber deaths and a dozen rescues.

== See also ==
- List of mountain peaks of California
- List of California fourteeners
- List of California county high points
- List of Ultras of the United States
- List of volcanoes in the United States
- Volcanic Legacy Scenic Byway

== Sources ==
- Crandell, D. R.; C. D. Miller; H. X. Glicken; R. L. Christiansen; C. G. Newhall (March 1984). "Catastrophic debris avalanche from ancestral Mount Shasta volcano, California". Geology. 12 (3): 143–146. Bibcode:1984Geo....12..143C. doi:10.1130/0091-7613(1984)12<143:CDAFAM>2.0.CO;2. ISSN 0091-7613.
- Crandell, D.R.; Nichols, D.R. (1987). Volcanic hazards at Mount Shasta, California. Reston, VA: U.S. Department of the Interior, U.S. Geological Survey.
- Harris, Stephen L. (2005). Fire Mountains of the West: The Cascade and Mono Lake Volcanoes (3rd ed.). Mountain Press Publishing Company. ISBN 978-0-87842-511-2.
- Lamson, Berenice (1984). "Mount Shasta : a regional history". University of the Pacific Theses and Dissertations: 140.
- "Mount Shasta Collection". College of the Siskiyous Library.
- Miesse, William C. (June 17, 2005). "Mount Shasta Fact Sheet". College of the Siskiyous Library. Archived from the original on November 3, 2005.
- Miesse, William C. "The Name 'Shasta'". Mount Shasta Annotated Bibliography. College of the Siskiyous Library. Archived from the original on May 15, 2006.
- Peterson, Robyn; Miesse, William C. (2008). Sudden and solitary: Mount Shasta and its artistic legacy, 1841–2008. Redding: Turtle Bay Exploration Park. ISBN 978-1-59714-088-1.
- "Peninsula Geological Society and Stanford GES-052Q combined field trip, Mount Shasta–Klamathnorthern Coast Range area, NW California, 05/17–05/20/2001" (PDF). Peninsula Geological Society.
- Wood, Charles A.; Kienle, Jürgen, eds. (1990). Volcanoes of North America. Cambridge University Press. ISBN 978-0-521-43811-7.
- Zanger, Michael (1992). Mount Shasta: History, Legend, Lore. Celestial Arts. ISBN 978-0-89087-674-9.
