= Strawberry Valley Station =

Historical place in Siskiyou County, United States

Strawberry Valley Stage Station
- Strawberry Valley Stage Station in 1865

- Location within California Location within the United States
- 41.308°N 122.329°W
- Location: 3 North Old Stage Road Mt Shasta, California

History
- Built: 1857

California Historical Landmark
- Designated: March 9, 1948
- Reference no.: 396

Strawberry Valley Stage Station was Stagecoach station from 1857 to 1886. Strawberry Valley Stage Station is in Siskiyou County, California. Strawberry Valley Station is a California Historical Landmark No. 396 listed on March 9, 1948. At the Strawberry Valley Stage Station travelers could rest and eat. At the Strawberry Valley Stage Station the drivers could get fresh horses. The town that grew up around the station became known as Strawberry Valley.

Across the road from the Strawberry Valley Stage Station was the Berryvale United States Postal Service, opened in 1870 and closed in 1887, The Berryvale Post office first postmaster was Justin Hinckley Sisson (1826-1893). Near to the Strawberry Valley Stage Station was the Sisson Hotel. The Sisson Hotel was built by Sisson in 1865 and lost in a 1916 fire. Sisson also ran a trout hatchery, starting in 1887. Nearby was the Mount Shasta trout hatchery which was founded in 1888. Sisson was such as major part of the town, Strawberry Valley was renamed Sisson. Strawberry Valley Stage Station closed in 1886 when the railroad line was completed. In 1886, Sisson donated the land for the Central Pacific Railroad station. The center of town moved with the founding of the railroad line and the city of Sisson was renamed Mount Shasta City in 1923.

A historical marker is at the site of the former Strawberry Valley Stage Station on 3 North Old Stage Road Mt Shasta, California. The marker was placed there by Siskiyou County Historical Society in 1947.

Justin Hinckley Sisson (1826-1893) founder of Mount Shasta Ca.

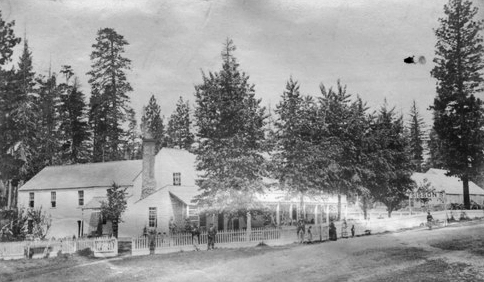
Sisson Hotel in Mount Shasta, California in 1879. Sisson Hotel was built by J. H. Sisson in 1865 and lost in a 1916 fire. Mount Shasta Ca. was called Strawberry Valley at the time and in 1887 called Sisson after J. H. Sisson

== See also ==
- California Historical Landmarks in Siskiyou County
