= Mount Shasta, California =

City in California, United States

- City
- Interactive map of Mount Shasta, California
- Location in the United States
- Coordinates: 41°18′52″N 122°18′41″W
- Country: United States
- State: California
- County: Siskiyou
- Incorporated: May 31, 1905

Government
  - Mayor: Casey Glaubman

Area
  - Total: 3.77 sq mi (9.76 km^{2})
  - Land: 3.76 sq mi (9.75 km^{2})
  - Water: 0.0039 sq mi (0.01 km^{2}) 0.10%
- Elevation: 3,586 ft (1,093 m)

Population (2020)
  - Total: 3,223
  - Density: 856/sq mi (331/km^{2})
- Time zone: UTC−8 (Pacific (PST))
  - Summer (DST): UTC−7 (PDT)
- ZIP Code: 96067
- Area code: 530
- FIPS code: 06-49852
- GNIS feature IDs: 277559, 2411181
- Website: mtshastaca.gov

Mount Shasta (also known as Mount Shasta City) is a city in Siskiyou County, California, United States, at approximately 3,600 feet (1,100 m) above sea level on the flanks of Mount Shasta, a prominent northern California landmark. The city is less than 9 miles (14 km) southwest of the summit of its namesake volcano.

Mount Shasta is the final community up the Sacramento River, located along Interstate Highway 5, approximately 14 kilometers (nine miles) south of Weed and approximately six kilometers (3.7 miles) north of Dunsmuir, and marks the river's northern terminus, approximately 2.5 kilometers (1.5 miles) downstream from the Sacramento River Forks.

Mount Shasta's population is 3,223 as of the 2020 census, a 5.04% decrease from the 3,394 recorded in the 2010 census.

== History ==
The site of the present-day city of Mount Shasta was within the range of the Okwanuchu tribe of Native Americans.

During the 1820s, early Euro-American trappers and hunters first passed through the area, following the path of the Siskiyou Trail. The Siskiyou Trail was based on a network of ancient Native American footpaths connecting California and the Pacific Northwest. The discovery of gold at nearby Yreka, California, in 1851 dramatically increased traffic along the Siskiyou Trail and through the site of present-day Mount Shasta. Pioneer Ross McCloud built one of the first lumber mills in the area, near the site of the present Sisson Museum. The completion of a stagecoach road between Yreka and Upper Soda Springs in the late 1850s led to the building of Sisson's Hotel, as a stop for weary travelers, and as a staging ground for adventuresome tourists intending to climb Mount Shasta.

The area where the town grew was known first as Strawberry Valley, and then as Berryvale. The post office opened in 1870 as Berryvale. After 1886 it was known as Sisson after a local businessman, Justin Hinckley Sisson who ran a stagecoach inn and tavern, Strawberry Valley Station, as well as donated the land for the town site and the Central Pacific Railroad station in 1886. Street names honor members of Sisson's family.

The 1887 completion of the Central Pacific Railroad, built along the line of the Siskiyou Trail, brought a dramatic increase in tourism, lumbering, and population into Mount Shasta. This early development continued to focus on tourism and lumbering. The early 1900s saw the influx of a large number of Italian immigrants to Mount Shasta and neighboring towns, most of whom were employed in the timber industry.

The city incorporated on May 31, 1905. The name of the city was finalized "City of Mount Shasta" on November 10, 1925, after a popular vote in 1922.

== Geography ==
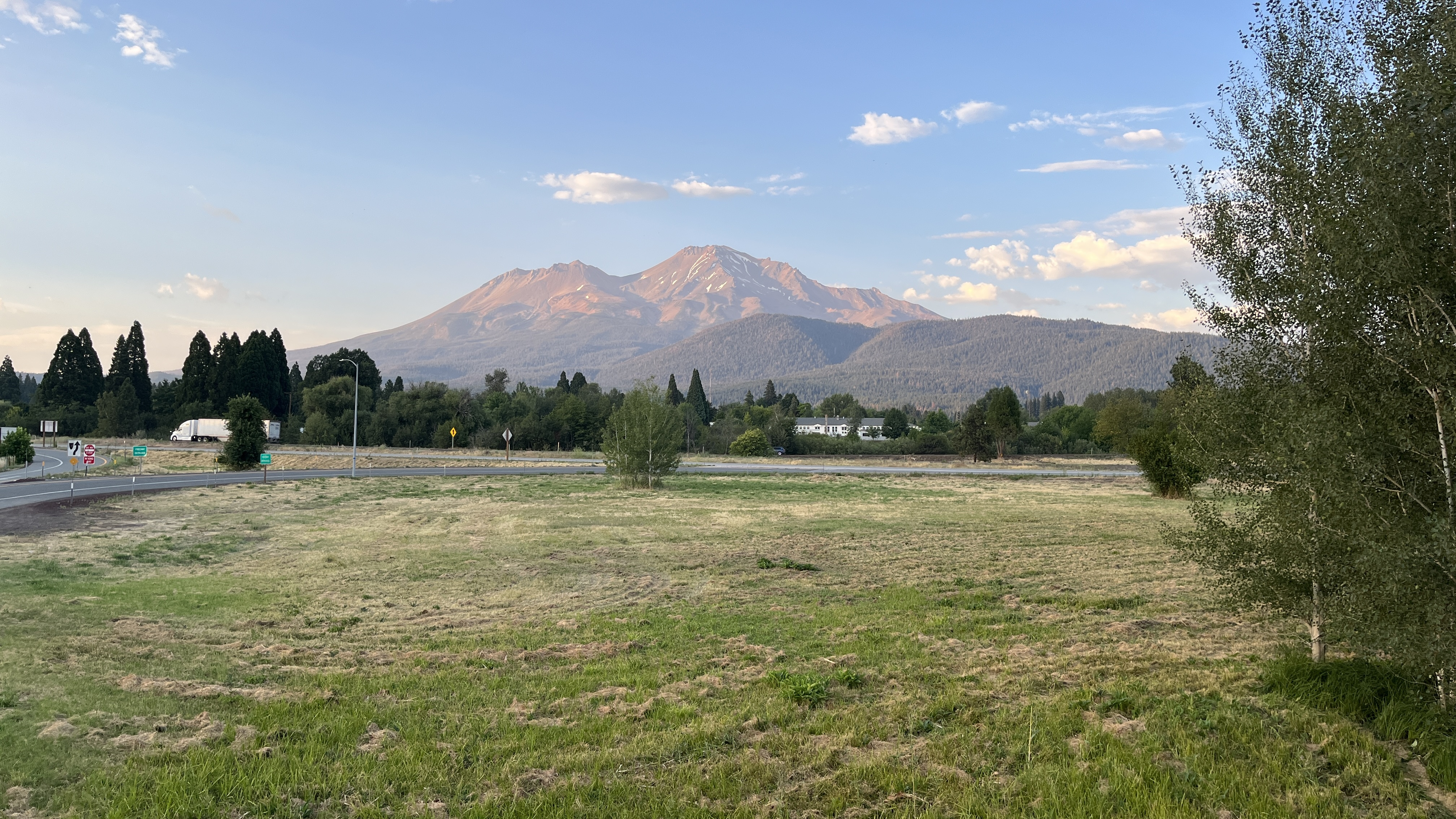
Mt. Shasta is visible from the I-5 onramp in Mount Shasta City

According to the United States Census Bureau, the city has a total area of 3.8 square miles (9.8 km^{2}), of which 3.8 square miles (9.8 km^{2}) is land and only 0.10% of it is covered by water.

The area hydrology consists of an unnamed stream in the south part of town which joins Big Springs Creek, which then flows south as Cold Creek to join the headwaters of the South Fork of the Sacramento River. The typical depth to groundwater is quite shallow in the predominant alluvium.

The settlement is on the distal gently sloping southwest flanks of Mount Shasta, with the chief surficial soils being Quaternary alluvium. This alluvium is adjacent to and probably underlain by volcanic clastic rock deposited by Mount Shasta in the course of its development. Groundwater elevation is approximately at the elevation of the underlying native black peat soil. Where it occurs this peat, of approximately two feet thickness, is underlain by stream deposit sands and gravels.

=== Climate ===
Mount Shasta to the east forces moisture out of the air as it rises and cools, and the dip in the Klamath Mountains allows more moisture to reach inland, so the city receives more precipitation than the semiarid region to the north. This means that in the winter, the city gets nearly 103 inches or 2.6 meters of snowfall despite its low 3,600 feet (1,100 m) elevation. Other towns in the region get much less snow, for example Yreka averages only 11.8 inches or 0.30 meters, and much cooler Klamath Falls only 35.9 inches or 0.91 meters. The Köppen climate classification is Csb, or warm-summer Mediterranean climate. It can be very warm and cold according to the Californian summer anex. The USDA hardiness zone is 7b.

The record high temperature was 106 °F (41.1 °C) on July 29, 2022, and the record low temperature was −13 °F (−25 °C) on December 22, 1990. The wettest "rain year" was from July 1997 to June 1998 with 76.24 inches (1,936.5 mm) and the driest from July 1976 to June 1977 with 13.06 inches (331.7 mm). The most rainfall in one month was 27.48 inches (698.0 mm) in January 1995, including 5.97 inches (151.6 mm) on January 9. The most snowfall in one year was 349.6 inches (8.9 m) in 1952, including 137.7 inches (3.5 m) in January 1952. The most snow on the ground was 52 inches or 1.3 meters on December 31, 1992.

Climate data for Mount Shasta, California, 1991–2020 normals, extremes 1948–present
Month	Jan	Feb	Mar	Apr	May	Jun	Jul	Aug	Sep	Oct	Nov	Dec	Year
Record high °F (°C)	68 (20)	71 (22)	80 (27)	87 (31)	96 (36)	103 (39)	106 (41)	105 (41)	103 (39)	93 (34)	80 (27)	72 (22)	106 (41)
Mean maximum °F (°C)	58.5 (14.7)	62.3 (16.8)	69.5 (20.8)	77.2 (25.1)	86.0 (30.0)	91.7 (33.2)	96.3 (35.7)	95.3 (35.2)	91.5 (33.1)	81.5 (27.5)	67.6 (19.8)	55.9 (13.3)	97.5 (36.4)
Mean daily maximum °F (°C)	44.4 (6.9)	47.6 (8.7)	52.7 (11.5)	59.0 (15.0)	68.1 (20.1)	76.0 (24.4)	85.2 (29.6)	84.3 (29.1)	77.9 (25.5)	64.3 (17.9)	50.1 (10.1)	42.7 (5.9)	62.7 (17.1)
Daily mean °F (°C)	35.8 (2.1)	37.9 (3.3)	41.9 (5.5)	46.5 (8.1)	54.2 (12.3)	61.1 (16.2)	68.1 (20.1)	66.8 (19.3)	61.0 (16.1)	50.9 (10.5)	40.5 (4.7)	34.8 (1.6)	50.0 (10.0)
Mean daily minimum °F (°C)	27.2 (−2.7)	28.1 (−2.2)	31.0 (−0.6)	34.1 (1.2)	40.4 (4.7)	46.2 (7.9)	51.0 (10.6)	49.4 (9.7)	44.2 (6.8)	37.5 (3.1)	30.9 (−0.6)	26.9 (−2.8)	37.2 (2.9)
Mean minimum °F (°C)	15.1 (−9.4)	17.1 (−8.3)	20.7 (−6.3)	24.6 (−4.1)	30.1 (−1.1)	36.5 (2.5)	42.5 (5.8)	41.5 (5.3)	34.4 (1.3)	26.3 (−3.2)	18.1 (−7.7)	13.7 (−10.2)	9.9 (−12.3)
Record low °F (°C)	−2 (−19)	−3 (−19)	13 (−11)	14 (−10)	21 (−6)	25 (−4)	32 (0)	34 (1)	25 (−4)	17 (−8)	6 (−14)	−13 (−25)	−13 (−25)
Average precipitation inches (mm)	7.11 (181)	7.44 (189)	6.18 (157)	3.23 (82)	2.23 (57)	1.23 (31)	0.23 (5.8)	0.21 (5.3)	0.53 (13)	2.18 (55)	4.28 (109)	7.78 (198)	42.63 (1,083.1)
Average snowfall inches (cm)	18.2 (46)	20.3 (52)	11.0 (28)	5.4 (14)	0.3 (0.76)	0.0 (0.0)	0.0 (0.0)	0.0 (0.0)	0.0 (0.0)	0.2 (0.51)	7.8 (20)	26.1 (66)	89.3 (227.27)
Average precipitation days (≥ 0.01 in)	13.2	12.8	13.2	11.2	9.0	4.9	1.8	1.5	2.7	6.1	10.8	13.9	101.1
Average snowy days (≥ 0.1 in)	6.3	5.4	4.3	2.9	0.2	0.0	0.0	0.0	0.0	0.3	2.9	6.9	29.2
Source 1: NOAA
Source 2: National Weather Service

== Demographics ==
Historical population
Census	Pop.	Note	%±
1890	556		—
1910	636		—
1920	542		−14.8%
1930	1,009		86.2%
1940	1,618		60.4%
1950	1,909		18.0%
1960	1,936		1.4%
1970	2,256		16.5%
1980	2,837		25.8%
1990	3,460		22.0%
2000	3,621		4.7%
2010	3,394		−6.3%
2020	3,223		−5.0%
U.S. Decennial Census

=== 2020 census ===
As of the 2020 census, Mount Shasta had a population of 3,223 and a population density of 855.8 inhabitants per square mile (330.4/km^{2}). The census reported that 99.6% of the population lived in households, 0.4% lived in non-institutionalized group quarters, and no one was institutionalized. Of residents, 96.4% lived in urban areas and 3.6% lived in rural areas.

There were 1,662 households, out of which 20.7% had children under the age of 18. Of all households, 31.6% were married-couple households, 7.8% were cohabiting couple households, 35.9% had a female householder with no spouse or partner present, and 24.7% had a male householder with no spouse or partner present. 44.9% of households were one person, and 25.3% were one person aged 65 or older. The average household size was 1.93, and there were 802 families (48.3% of all households).

The age distribution was 16.6% under age 18, 6.1% from age 18 to 24, 20.7% from age 25 to 44, 27.4% from age 45 to 64, and 29.2% age 65 or older. The median age was 50.3 years. For every 100 females, there were 91.0 males, and for every 100 females age 18 and over, there were 87.8 males age 18 and over.

There were 1,906 housing units at an average density of 506.1 units per square mile (195.4 units/km^{2}), of which 12.8% were vacant. Of occupied housing units, 50.2% were owner-occupied and 49.8% were occupied by renters. The homeowner vacancy rate was 2.3%, and the rental vacancy rate was 5.2%.

Racial composition as of the 2020 census
Race	Number	Percent
White	2,669	82.8%
Black or African American	48	1.5%
American Indian and Alaska Native	28	0.9%
Asian	52	1.6%
Native Hawaiian and Other Pacific Islander	4	0.1%
Some other race	77	2.4%
Two or more races	345	10.7%
Hispanic or Latino (of any race)	284	8.8%

=== Income and poverty ===
In 2023, the US Census Bureau estimated that the median household income was $48,157, and the per capita income was $32,291. About 6.8% of families and 16.0% of the population were below the poverty line.

=== 2010 census ===
The 2010 United States census reported that Mount Shasta had a population of 3,394. The population density was 900.3 inhabitants per square mile (347.6/km^{2}). The racial makeup of Mount Shasta was 3,041 (89.6%) White, 61 (1.8%) African American, 19 (0.6%) Native American, 56 (1.6%) Asian, 2 (0.1%) Pacific Islander, 51 (1.5%) from other races, and 164 (4.8%) from two or more races. Hispanic or Latino of any race were 277 persons (8.2%).

The Census reported that 3,358 people (98.9% of the population) lived in households, 6 (0.2%) lived in non-institutionalized group quarters, and 30 (0.9%) were institutionalized.

There were 1,664 households, out of which 401 (24.1%) had children under the age of 18 living in them, 537 (32.3%) were married couples, 190 (11.4%) had a female householder with no husband present, 84 (5.0%) had a male householder with no wife present. There were 113 (6.8%) unmarried couples, and only 9 (0.5%) same-sex couples. 719 households (43.2%) were made up of individuals, and 285 (17.1%) had someone living alone who was 65 years of age or older. The average household size was 2.02. There were 811 families (48.7% of all households); the average family size was 2.79.

The population was spread out, with 692 people (20.4%) under the age of 18, 242 people (7.1%) aged 18 to 24, 732 people (21.6%) aged 25 to 44, 1,109 people (32.7%) aged 45 to 64, and 619 people (18.2%) who were 65 years of age or older. The median age was 45.7 years. For every 100 females, there were 84.7 males. For every 100 females age 18 and over, there were 80.6 males.

There were 1,895 housing units at an average density of 502.7 units per square mile (194.1 units/km^{2}), of which 781 (46.9%) were owner-occupied, and 883 (53.1%) were occupied by renters. The homeowner vacancy rate was 2.5%; the rental vacancy rate was 5.8%. 1,699 people (50.1% of the population) lived in owner-occupied housing units and 1,659 people (48.9%) lived in rental housing units.

== Economy ==
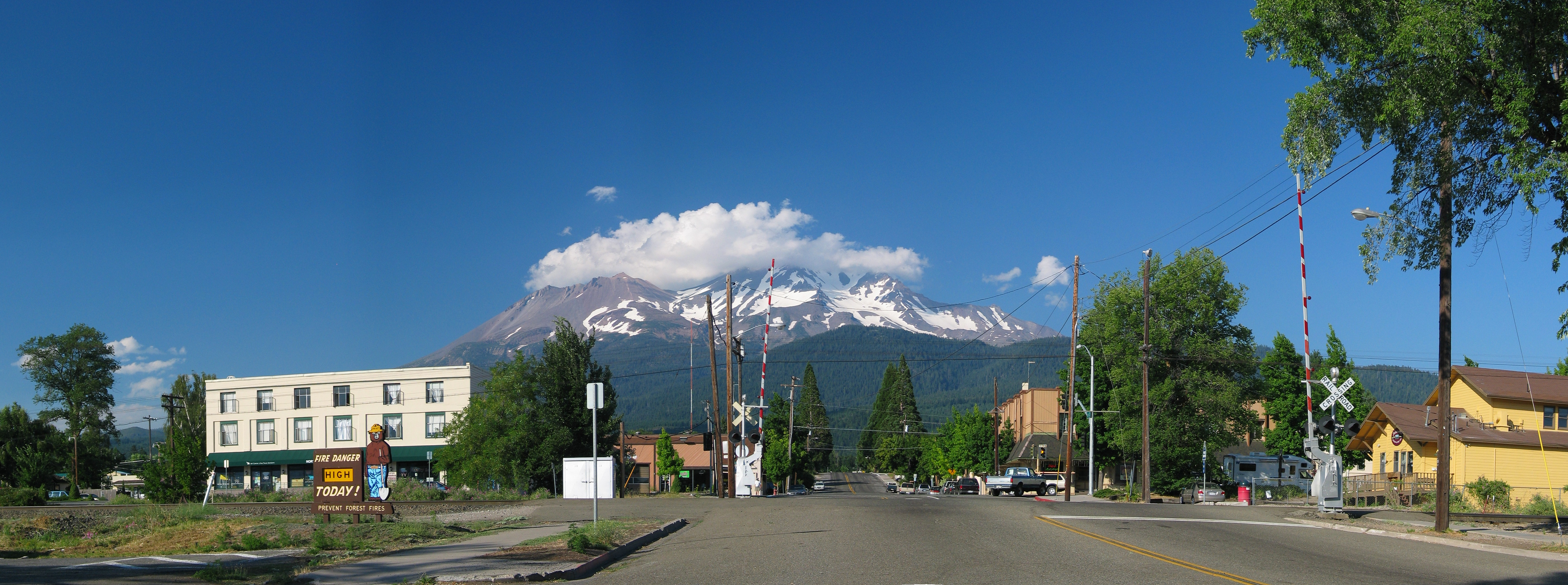
Downtown Mount Shasta, California with the eponymous mountain visible in the background.

The city of Mount Shasta is located in the Shasta Cascade area of Northern California. Visitors use the city as a base for trout fishing in the nearby Sacramento, McCloud and Klamath rivers, for climbing at Mount Shasta, Castle Crags or the Trinity Alps, or to view scenery. Both alpine and cross-country skiing runs are available nearby as well as biking or hiking to waterfalls, streams and lakes in the area, including nearby Mossbrae Falls, Lake Siskiyou, Castle Lake and Shasta Lake.

== Government ==
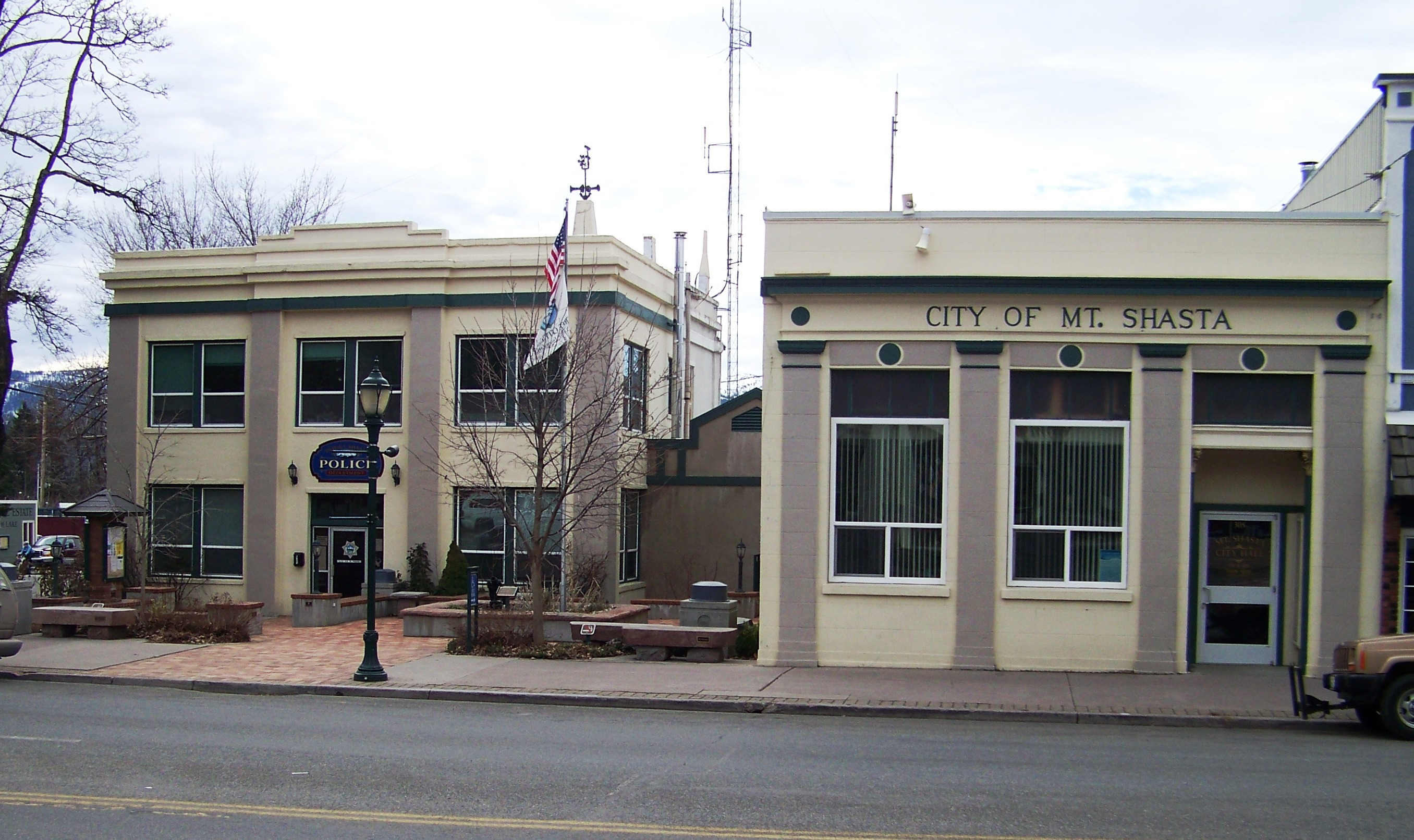
Mount Shasta Police Department and City Hall

The city council of Mount Shasta is composed of seven officials: five city council members, a city treasurer and a city clerk who are elected at large and serve a four-year term. The mayor and mayor pro tempore are elected each year from the five council members and serve a one-year term. John Redmond servec as mayor of Mount Shasta until November 2025, with Jeffrey Collings serving as mayor pro tem.

In the state legislature Mount Shasta is in the 1st senatorial district, represented by Republican Megan Dahle, and the 1st Assembly district, represented by Republican Heather Hadwick.

Federally, Mount Shasta is in California's 1st congressional district, represented by Republican James Gallagher.

== Media ==
- KHWA 99.3/102.3 FM Jefferson Public Radio, Mount Shasta
- KZRO-FM 100.1 Mount Shasta
- KKLC 107.9 K-LOVE, Fall River Mills
- KNSQ-FM 88.1 Jefferson Public Radio, Mount Shasta
- KLDD-FM 91.9 Jefferson Public Radio, Mount Shasta
- KMJC-AM 620 Jefferson Public Radio, Mount Shasta
- Siskiyou Country Radio (Internet Radio), Yreka
- KSQU Mount Shasta/KEDY Fort Jones/KYRE Yreka, Internet Radio (Siskiyou Broadcast Group)
- Mount Shasta Herald
- Vyve Broadband
- MCTV 15 Mountain Community Television/Siskiyou Media Council
- KSQU-TV Channel 8Y (Internet Television) Yreka/Mount Shasta/Siskiyou Broadcast Group

== Notable people ==
- Terry Huntingdon – Miss California USA 1959, Miss USA 1959
- Ann Little – silent-film actress
- Anita Loos – writer and author of the screenplay Gentlemen Prefer Blondes was born in Sisson (now Mount Shasta) in 1888
- Tony Olmos – film director and screenwriter
- Jason Sehorn – former NFL cornerback, graduated Mount Shasta High School in 1989
- D. J. Wilson – basketball player, first-round selection in 2017 NBA draft; born in Mount Shasta

== See also ==
- McCloud Railway
- Mount Shasta City Park
- Mount Shasta Ski Park
- Shasta Abbey
