= Wintun Glacier =

Glacier in California, United States

- Location within California Location within the United States
- Type: Mountain glacier
- Location: Siskiyou County, California, United States
- Coordinates: 41°24′28″N 122°10′56″W
- Area: .5 sq mi (1.3 km^{2})
- Length: 1.3 mi (2.1 km)
- Thickness: 68 ft (21 m) average
- Terminus: Moraine
- Status: Expanding

The Wintun Glacier is a glacier situated on the eastern flank of Mount Shasta, in the U.S. state of California. It is both the third largest and third most voluminous glacier in California after the neighboring Hotlum Glacier and the Whitney Glacier. The Wintun Glacier starts on the east side of Mount Shasta's main summit, and it has the highest permanent snow and ice on the mountain, reaching above 14,100 ft (4,300 m) to within a few dozen feet (~8–15 m) of the true summit. The glacier flows east down a steep slope and terminates in two lobes, the longer of which extends down near 9,800 ft (3,000 m).

In 2002, scientists made the first detailed survey of Mount Shasta's glaciers in 50 years. They found that seven of the glaciers have grown over the period 1951–2002, with the Hotlum and Wintun Glaciers nearly doubling, the Bolam Glacier increasing by half, and the Whitney and Konwakiton Glaciers growing by a third.

== See also ==
- List of glaciers
