= Bolam Glacier =

Glacier in California, United States

- Location within California
- Type: Mountain glacier
- Location: Siskiyou County, California, U.S.
- Coordinates: 41°24′55″N 122°12′02″W
- Area: 2 sq mi (5.2 km^{2})
- Length: 1.4 mi (2.3 km)
- Thickness: 70 ft (21 m) average
- Terminus: Moraine
- Status: Expanding

The Bolam Glacier is a glacier situated on the northern flank of Mount Shasta, in the U.S. state of California. It is the second longest glacier in California behind the nearby Whitney Glacier, and the fourth largest and most voluminous after the neighboring Hotlum Glacier, Whitney Glacier, and Wintun Glacier. The Bolam Glacier flows from a cirque on the north side of Mount Shasta's main summit, with the moving ice starting below a large bergschrund which spans the glacier at 12,600 ft (3,800 m). Above that, permanent snow and ice extends towards the summit to about 13,500 ft (4,100 m). The glacier flows north down a steep slope and terminates near 9,800 ft (3,000 m). It has a contributing drainage area of 1.03 km^{2}.

In 2002, scientists made the first detailed survey of Mount Shasta's glaciers in 50 years. They found that seven of the glaciers have grown over the period 1951–2002, with the Hotlum and Wintun nearly doubling, the Bolam increasing by half, and the Whitney and Konwakiton Glaciers growing by a third. Due to rising global temperatures, as of 2007, alpine glaciers and rock glaciers are shrinking across the western United States.

== See also ==
- List of glaciers in the United States
