= Hotlum Glacier =

Glacier in California, United States

- Location within California
- Type: Mountain glacier
- Location: Siskiyou County, California, US
- Coordinates: 41°25′13″N 122°11′16″W
- Area: .7 sq mi (1.8 km^{2})
- Length: 1.3 mi (2.1 km)
- Thickness: 67 ft (20 m) average
- Terminus: Moraine
- Status: Expanding

The Hotlum Glacier is a glacier situated on the northeast flank of Mount Shasta, in the US state of California. It is the largest and most voluminous glacier in California, although not as thick or long as the nearby Whitney Glacier. The Hotlum Glacier flows from a large cirque on the northeast side of Mount Shasta's main summit below the Hotlum Headwall at roughly 13,600 ft (4,100 m). It flows northeastward down the steep slope, forming three lobes which terminate near 10,400 ft (3,200 m).

In 2002, scientists made the first detailed survey of Mount Shasta's glaciers in 50 years. They found that seven of the glaciers have grown over the period 1951–2002, with the Hotlum and Wintun Glaciers nearly doubling, the Bolam Glacier increasing by half, and the Whitney and Konwakiton Glaciers growing by a third.

== See also ==
- List of glaciers in the United States
