= Whitney Glacier =

Glacier in California, United States

Whitney
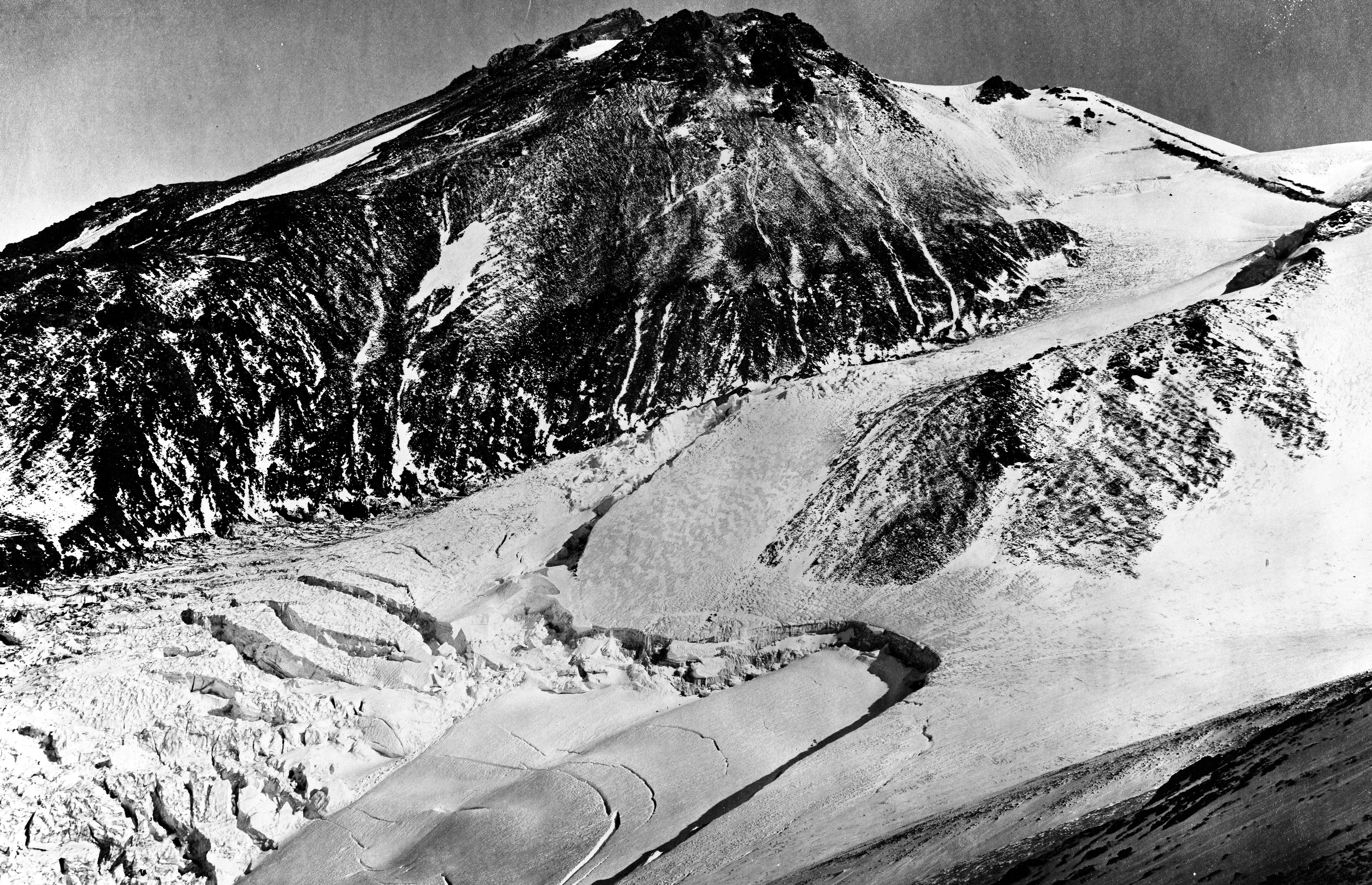

- Location within California Location within the United States
- Type: Mountain glacier
- Location: Mount Shasta, Siskiyou County, California, United States
- Coordinates: 41°24′50″N 122°12′41″W
- Area: .5 sq mi (1.3 km^{2})
- Length: 2 mi (3.2 km)
- Thickness: 126 ft (38 m) in 1986
- Terminus: Moraine
- Status: Expanding

The Whitney Glacier is a glacier situated on Mount Shasta, in the U.S. state of California. The Whitney Glacier is the longest glacier and the only valley glacier in California. In area and volume, it ranks second in the state behind the nearby Hotlum Glacier. In 1986, the glacier was measured to be 126 ft (38 m) deep and over three km in length. The glacier starts on Mount Shasta's Misery Hill at 13,700 ft (4,200 m) and flows northwestward down to the saddle between Mount Shasta and Shastina, where uneven ground causes a major icefall at 11,800 ft (3,600 m). It then flows down the valley between the two peaks, reaching its terminus at 9,500 to 9,800 ft (2,900 to 3,000 m).

== Advance ==
In 2002, scientists made the first detailed survey of Mount Shasta's glaciers in 50 years. They found that seven of the glaciers have grown over the period 1951–2002, with the Hotlum and Wintun Glaciers nearly doubling, the Bolam Glacier increasing by half, and the Whitney and Konwakiton Glaciers growing by a third. The study concluded that though there has been a two to three degree Celsius temperature rise in the region, there has also been a corresponding increase in the amount of snowfall. Increased temperatures have tapped Pacific Ocean moisture, leading to snowfalls that supply the accumulation zone of the glacier with 40 percent more snowfall than is melted in the ablation zone. Over the past 50 years, the glacier has actually expanded 30 percent, which is the opposite of what is being observed in most areas of the world. Researchers have also stated that if the global warming forecast for the upcoming next 100 years are accurate, the increased snowfall will not be enough to offset the increased melting, and the glacier is then likely to retreat.

Whitney Glacier, along with the Hubbard Glacier in Alaska, are larger now than in 1890. However, Hubbard Glacier, along with a few other notable glaciers whose termini are at sea level, are calving glaciers.

Glaciologists often point out that glaciers are sensitive indicators of climate. This paradigm should not be applied to calving glaciers. During most of the calving glacier cycle, the slow advances and relatively rapid retreats are not very sensitive to climate. For example, the calving glaciers that are currently growing and advancing in the face of global warming, were retreating throughout the little ice age. Calving glaciers become sensitive to climate only late in the advancing phase, when the mass flux out of the accumulation area approaches the mass lost by melting in the ablation area and losses due to calving can no longer be replaced. No reasonable change in climate will change this imbalance and stop the advances of these few glaciers.

== See also ==
- List of glaciers
