= KZRO =

Coordinates: 41°17′30″N 122°14′21″W

- Dunsmuir, California; United States
- Broadcast area: Dunsmuir / Redding / Mount Shasta / Yreka
- Frequency: 100.1 MHz
- Branding: Z100fm; The Z-Channel

Programming
- Format: Oldies/classic hits/classic rock
- Affiliations: Compass Media Networks; United Stations Radio Networks

Ownership
- Owner: Z-Channel Radio LLC

History
- First air date: December 8, 1992
- Former call signs: KRKD (1992–1994, CP)
- Call sign meaning: Z-Rockin' Oldies

Technical information
- Licensing authority: FCC
- Facility ID: 21223
- Class: C3
- ERP: 12,500 watts
- HAAT: 71 meters

Links
- Public license information: Public file; LMS
- Webcast: Listen Live
- Website: zchannelradio.com

KZRO (100.1 FM) (also known as Z100fm or The Z-Channel) is an oldies/classic hits/classic rock formatted radio station based in Mount Shasta, California (city of license is Dunsmuir, California). The owner, general manager, program director and lead on-air talent is Dennis Michael Crepps, known by his radio name "Dennis Michaels".

== History ==
The station first signed on the air as KRKD on the FM dial on December 8, 1992. Not much else is known about the ownership of the station at the time or what format was played before Big Tree Communications took over ownership in 1997. During that time, the station's call letters were changed to the current KZRO-FM at 100.1 with the city of license being out of Dunsmuir, California. The format for the station was changed to "rockin' oldies", predominantly a rock station to compete with other Siskiyou County radio stations such as KMJC-AM, KMJC-FM, KSYC-AM, KSYC-FM and KWHO-FM.

In 2021, KZRO became the only locally-run radio station in operation as their competing stations either went silent, became satellite radio affiliates or signed off for good within the next decade. KSYC-FM Yreka and KHWA Weed went silent in 2019 but returned to the air in 2022 as Jefferson Public Radio-owned stations joining KSYC-AM Yreka and KMJC-AM Mount Shasta that were already JPR stations; KMJC-FM Mount Shasta became a K-LOVE radio affiliate and changed call letters to KKLC in 2008; local church-owned station KMSJ-LP Mount Shasta signed off for good in 2022 and KSYC-AM Yreka signed off for good in 2024. KZRO continues to serve the Northern California region as Siskiyou County's only local station to this day.

Michaels would acquire the station under his own banner Z-Channel Radio LLC sometime in the 2010s.

The station, with the slogan "We're in it for the music, not the money," features only two commercial breaks per hour 24/7 on weekdays plus 30 hours of weekend syndicated programming (see below).

KZRO has been granted a construction permit by the U.S. Federal Communications Commission (FCC) to upgrade to Class C1 at a new transmitter site. The effective radiated power will increase to 13,500 watts, and the antenna height above average terrain will increase to 635 meters. This will cover nearly 225,000 persons in the Redding, California Nielson metro radio market. The station currently covers 195,000 persons in five counties throughout its 24,000-square-mile (62,000 km^{2}) coverage area.

== Past/present local talent ==
- Michele Cloutier (1997–present, part-time account executive and commercial talent)
- Rick Martin (2008-2009, formerly of KWSD/KMJC, KSYC/KYRE, KEDY, KNTK/KCWH/KSIZ)
- Kevin Sponsler (2024, formerly of KSYC-AM & FM, now of Siskiyou Country Radio)
