= KSYC =

KSYC may refer to:

- KSYC (AM), a radio station (1490 AM) licensed to Yreka, California, United States
- KSYC-FM, a radio station (103.9 FM) licensed to Yreka, California, United States
