= KAGI =

Radio station in Grants Pass, Oregon

- Grants Pass, Oregon; United States
- Frequency: 930 kHz
- Branding: Jefferson Public Radio

Programming
- Format: Public radio; news/talk
- Affiliations: NPR; American Public Media; Public Radio Exchange

Ownership
- Owner: Southern Oregon University

History
- First air date: December 16, 1939 (as KUIN at 1310)
- Former call signs: KUIN (1939–1958)
- Former frequencies: 1310 kHz (1939–1941); 1340 kHz (1941–1958)

Technical information
- Licensing authority: FCC
- Facility ID: 61334
- Class: D
- Power: 5,000 watts day 123 watts night
- Transmitter coordinates: 42°26′15.4″N 123°21′31.2″W
- Translator: 97.9 K250BZ (Grants Pass)

Links
- Public license information: Public file; LMS
- Webcast: Listen live
- Website: www.ijpr.org

KAGI (930 AM) is a radio station in Grants Pass, Oregon, United States. The station is owned by Southern Oregon University and is part of its Jefferson Public Radio (JPR) network; it airs JPR's "News & Information" service, consisting of news and talk programming. While it principally broadcasts at 930 kHz on the AM band, a translator, K250BZ (97.9 FM), rebroadcasts its programming on the FM band in the Grants Pass area.

KAGI is the oldest station in Grants Pass, starting as KUIN on December 16, 1939. It became KAGI in 1958, coinciding with a power increase. The Smullin family was involved in the station for its first 52 years of existence until donating the station to Southern Oregon University in 1991. The donations of KAGI and KSJK in Talent allowed JPR to begin providing a separate news and information station.

== History ==
The station was put on the air as KUIN by Southern Oregon Broadcasting Company—a group formed by Bill Smullin, founder of California Oregon Broadcasting, Inc., and Grants Pass Daily Courier publisher Amos Voorhies—on December 16, 1939. It was the first radio station in Grants Pass. The call letters were taken from the former name of station manager John Bauriedel's wife, Quinn.

The station broadcast at 1310 kHz from its start until March 29, 1941, when all stations on 1310 moved to 1340 kHz as part of the radio reallocations of NARBA; it operated with 100 watts until being approved for 250 watts on June 4, 1940. KUIN joined the Mutual Broadcasting System and Don Lee Network in 1943. In 1958, KUIN was approved to change its frequency from 1340 to 930 kHz and operate with 1,000 watts; it changed its call letters to KAGI on December 5, 1958. A previous attempt to move to 1480 kHz with 5,000 watts was denied in 1956 on interference grounds.

In 1961, a sale of the station was made to a group of stockholders known as KAGI, Inc., in which Southern Oregon Broadcasting Company was also an owner. The sale came a year after Voorhies died; by his death, he had also owned part of three Oregon television stations in association with Smullin.

The adult contemporary-formatted station was donated to Southern Oregon State College, now Southern Oregon University, by the Smullin family in 1991, a donation valued at $300,000. It was the second donation of an AM station to the network after KSJK in Talent, Oregon, in 1990. The donations of the two AM stations allowed the college's Jefferson Public Radio network to begin broadcasting a separate news and information service on the transmitters.
