= KMJC (disambiguation) =

KMJC may mean:

- KMJC 620 in Mount Shasta, California
- previously KECR AM 910 El Cajon, California
- now KMXG FM 96.1 Clinton, Iowa, formerly KMJC-FM starting 1989 November 24 or 1990 May 14
- now KKLC FM 107.9 in Mount Shasta, California, former KMJC-FM starting 1995 November 1
- Koninklijke Marine Jachtclub (Royal Navy Yacht Club) of the Royal Netherlands Navy
