= KCWH =

KCWH may refer to:

- KCWH-LD, a low-power television station (channel 18) licensed to serve Lincoln, Nebraska, United States
- KHWA, a radio station (102.3 FM) licensed to serve Weed, California, United States, which held the call sign KCWH from 2008 to 2012
