= KSYC-FM =

Coordinates: 41.610°N 122.625°W

- Yreka, California; United States
- Frequency: 103.9 MHz
- Branding: JPR News and Information

Programming
- Format: Public radio; news/talk
- Network: Jefferson Public Radio

Ownership
- Owner: Southern Oregon University

History
- First air date: June 1, 1983 (as KYRE at 97.7)
- Former call signs: KYRE (1983–1995)
- Former frequencies: 97.7 MHz (1983–1995)
- Call sign meaning: Siskiyou County

Technical information
- Licensing authority: FCC
- Facility ID: 15314
- Class: C1
- ERP: 10,000 watts
- HAAT: 719 meters (2,359 ft)
- Translators: 92.1 K221BK (Etna); 98.9 K255AK (Happy Camp)

Links
- Public license information: Public file; LMS
- Webcast: Listen live
- Website: www.ijpr.org

KSYC-FM (103.9 FM) is a public radio station based in Yreka, California, owned by Southern Oregon University and operated by Jefferson Public Radio.

== History ==
The station was founded in the 1970s by Dalmatian Enterprises, Inc., which also owned KSYC (1490 AM), the original country music station in Siskiyou County. The new station was given the call sign KYRE and licensed to operate at frequency 97.7 FM. It signed on the air on June 1, 1983, and played the pop/rock format with George Calvin Booth as the station's program director and main on-air talent. In the latter years of KYRE, it was promoted as "Hot Hits Y98". Y98 later became an affiliate of AT40 with Casey Kasem on August 24, 1985.

The station was purchased in 1995 by Siskiyou Radio Partners, Inc., and the call sign was changed to KSYC-FM as a way of moving the country music format over to the FM band and make way for the fast-growing news/talk format on the AM station. The frequency was also moved from FM 97.7 to FM 103.9 that same year. The station's program director became Kevin Sponsler, who was PD of the AM station before the switch. KSYC-FM quickly replaced rival KWHO-FM as the county's only country music station when that station was sold to Huth Broadcasting in 1997 and KWHO's music format changed from country to hot adult contemporary.

KSYC-FM was sold to Four Rivers Broadcasting in 2000, as were KSYC, KMJC, and KMJC-FM and later KWHO (from Huth Broadcasting) in 2001. It was then sold to Jamison-Wolf Broadcasting in 2008 along with sister station KNTK (now KHWA). The station's general manager was Lee Jamison and program director was once again Kevin Sponsler, who served that position previously from 1995 to 2003. Local news was featured hourly in the mornings with news director longtime news veteran Corky Small anchoring.

The station was nearly sold to Jefferson Public Radio in the fall of 2010 in hopes of improving its signal in the Yreka area. When rumors of the pending purchase were confirmed, the Siskiyou County Board of Supervisors voted against the sale and JPR withdrew its offer. The station was then acquired on March 1, 2011, by local and longtime residents of Siskiyou County, Mark and Cyndi Baird. The company is known as Buffalo Broadcasting, LLC.

On October 1, 2021, KSYC-FM went silent. The station's license was up for renewal and was to expire on December 1, 2021.

Effective July 19, 2022, KSYC-FM was officially purchased by Southern Oregon University and now broadcasts programming from Jefferson Public Radio.

== Local sports ==
KSYC-FM had been the flagship station for Yreka High School football and basketball since the very beginning. They featured 30-plus-year veteran announcer Mark McAllister on the play-by-play and Al Reichenbach on the color commentary during the early 2000s. McAllister and Reichenbach have since retired.

== Alumni ==
- George Calvin Booth (afternoon talent, 1995–2000) (formerly of KYRE-FM 97.7 "Hot Hits Y98")
- Joe Kesterson (deejay from 6 p.m.-9 p.m., 2011–2017) (died of esophageal cancer on September 28, 2017)
- Mark McAllister (voice of Yreka High School football and basketball)
- Al Reichenbach (color analyst for Yreka High School football and basketball, now deceased)
- Kevin Sponsler (morning on-air talent)
- Susanna Fox (afternoon 12 noon-6 p.m., now of KZRO)

Adam Sizemore (mornings 7am-10am, 2019–2021)

- Chris Stevens 2005-2021

Production manager/ air talent

== Translators ==
KSYC-FM also broadcasts on the following translators:

Broadcast translators for KSYC-FM
Call sign	Frequency	City of license	FID	ERP (W)	Class	FCC info
K221BK	92.1 FM	Etna, California	43920	37	D	LMS
K255AK	98.9 FM	Happy Camp, California	84116	47	D	LMS

== See also ==
- KSYC (AM)
