= Shasta River =

River in California, United States

Shasta River Sastise River, Sasty River
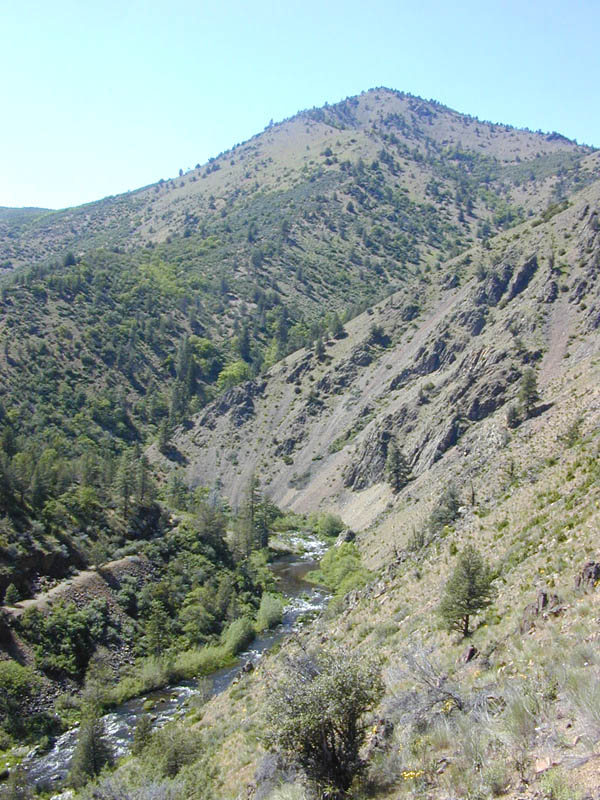
- Shasta River from State Route 263

- Location of the mouth of Shasta River in California
- Native name: Riviere Des Sastes (French)

Location
- Country: United States
- State: California
- Region: Siskiyou County
- City: Yreka

Physical characteristics
- Source: Mount Eddy
  - location: 10 miles (16 km) south of Weed, Siskiyou County
  - coordinates: 41°24′12″N 122°26′06″W
- Mouth: Klamath River
  - location: Junction of California SR's 263 and 96
  - coordinates: 41°49′51″N 122°35′39″W
  - elevation: 2,037 ft (621 m)
- Length: 58 mi (93 km)
- Basin size: 800 sq mi (2,100 km^{2})
- Discharge
  - location: Yreka
  - average: 182 cu ft/s (5.2 m^{3}/s)
  - minimum: 1.5 cu ft/s (0.042 m^{3}/s)
  - maximum: 21,500 cu ft/s (610 m^{3}/s)

The Shasta River is a tributary of the Klamath River, approximately 58 miles (93 km) long, in northern California in the United States. It drains the Shasta Valley on the west and north sides of Mount Shasta in the Cascade Range.

The river rises in southern Siskiyou County on the edge of the Shasta-Trinity National Forest, approximately 10 miles (16 km) southwest of Weed. It flows generally northwest through the Shasta Valley, past Weed, through Lake Shastina, and past Montague. It joins the Klamath from the south approximately 8 miles (13 km) north-northeast of Yreka.

The Shasta Valley is dominated by nearby Mount Shasta and underlain with volcanic basalt from eruptions of the mountain in recent geologic time. Pluto's Cave is an example of voids remaining after highly fluid lava drained from underground conduits which were fed by volcanic vents to the east. The Shasta Valley is covered with small hillocks extending from the base of Mt. Shasta north to just beyond the city of Montague, that are the debris from the liquefication of the ancestral Mount Shasta sometime within the past 400,000 years.

== Course ==
Rising on the east slope of Mount Eddy several miles west of Mount Shasta and about 25 miles (40 km) northwest of Shasta Lake, the Shasta River immediately proceeds to flow through a wide agricultural valley. Running north, parallel to Interstate 5, for the next few miles, the Shasta receives its first important tributary, Eddy Creek, from the left, 37 miles (60 km) from the mouth. It then crosses under the interstate, winds past a ridge, and passes the town of Weed. It then turns northeast into Lake Shastina, an artificial lake formed by a dam at its north end, and turns northwest.

Bypassing Big Springs 30 miles (48 km) from the mouth, the river picks up more agricultural runoff as it meanders north between irrigated fields. The river then passes between Yreka and Montague, 10 miles (16 km) from the mouth, crossed by California State Route 3 and Interstate 5 for the final time. It then enters a canyon in the Klamath Mountains, 3 miles (4.8 km) from the mouth, and begins to parallel California State Route 263. Its mouth is on the left bank of the Klamath River, at the junction of State Route 263 and State Route 96.

== Watershed ==
The roughly 800-square-mile (2,100 km^{2}) watershed of the Shasta River consists of a semi-arid farming valley entirely in Siskiyou County. It is adjacent to the Scott River on the west, Butte Creek on the east, and the main Klamath River on the north. The watershed is located east of the Klamath Mountains and northwest of Mount Shasta. Some towns in the watershed include Weed, Edgewood, Gazelle, Big Springs, Grenada, Montague, and Yreka. Major bodies of water include Lake Shastina (Dwinnell Reservoir) and Trout Lake.

Receiving just 14 inches (36 cm) of rain yearly on average, the 30-mile (48 km)-wide Shasta River Valley receives most of its surface water flow from groundwater, and now, agricultural return flows. It also receives some water from snow runoff at Mount Shasta - which flows out of lava tubes as springs and feeds east-side Shasta River tributaries such as Big Springs Creek.

== Natural history ==
The Shasta River is spawning site for a run of endangered Chinook salmon. Estimates suggest that 80,000 adults fish once returned to the river every year, the largest returning population of any tributary in the Klamath watershed besides the Trinity River

Today, less than 10% of this population still returns, and recent droughts have severely hampered survival rates of juvenile fish.

The river also supports coho salmon and steelhead.

== Tributaries ==
- Beaughton Creek
