= KNHT =

Coordinates: 40.501°N 124.287°W

- Rio Dell, California; United States
- Broadcast area: Eureka, California
- Frequency: 102.5 MHz
- Branding: Jefferson Public Radio

Programming
- Format: Public radio; news, classical music
- Affiliations: National Public Radio; American Public Media; Public Radio Exchange

Ownership
- Owner: Southern Oregon University

History
- First air date: 1999 (at 107.3)
- Former frequencies: 107.3 MHz (1999–2017)

Technical information
- Licensing authority: FCC
- Facility ID: 17412
- Class: C2
- ERP: 3,400 watts
- HAAT: 509 meters (1,670 ft)
- Translator: 101.9 K270AV (Mendocino)

Links
- Public license information: Public file; LMS
- Webcast: Listen live
- Website: www.ijpr.org

KNHT (102.5 FM) is a radio station licensed to Rio Dell, California. The station is owned by Southern Oregon University, and is an affiliate of Jefferson Public Radio, airing JPR's "Classics & News" service, consisting of news and classical music programming.
