= KPMO =

- Mendocino, California; United States
- Frequency: 1300 kHz (HD Radio)
- Branding: Jefferson Public Radio

Programming
- Format: News/Talk (Public)
- Affiliations: National Public Radio; American Public Media; Public Radio International

Ownership
- Owner: Southern Oregon University

History
- First air date: 1967
- Former call signs: KMFB (1966–1979)
- Former frequencies: 1520 kHz (1967–1968)

Technical information
- Licensing authority: FCC
- Facility ID: 31596
- Class: D
- Power: 5,000 watts (day); 77 watts (night)
- Transmitter coordinates: 39°20′32.6″N 123°46′55″W

Links
- Public license information: Public file; LMS
- Webcast: Listen live
- Website: ijpr.org

KPMO (1300 AM) is a radio station licensed to Mendocino, California. The station is owned by Southern Oregon University, and is an affiliate of Jefferson Public Radio, airing JPR's "News & Information" service, consisting of news and talk programming.
