= KWCA =

KWCA may refer to:

- KWCA (TV), the fictional callsign of a television station in San Luis Obispo, California, United States
- KWCA (FM), a radio station (101.1 FM) licensed to Palo Cedro, California, United States
