= KSKF =

KSKF may refer to:

- KSKF (FM), a radio station (90.9 FM) licensed to Klamath Falls, Oregon, United States
- Lackland Air Force Base (ICAO code KSKF)
- Kelly Field Annex (ICAO code KSKF)
