= KNHM =

Coordinates: 40.727°N 123.974°W

- Bayside, California; United States
- Broadcast area: Eureka, California
- Frequency: 91.5 MHz (HD Radio)
- Branding: Jefferson Public Radio

Programming
- Format: News/Talk (Public)
- Affiliations: National Public Radio; American Public Media; Public Radio International

Ownership
- Owner: Southern Oregon University

Technical information
- Licensing authority: FCC
- Facility ID: 12486
- Class: C3
- ERP: 500 watts
- HAAT: 525 meters (1,722 ft)

Links
- Public license information: Public file; LMS
- Webcast: Listen live
- Website: www.ijpr.org

KNHM (91.5 FM) is a radio station licensed to Bayside, California. The station is owned by Southern Oregon University, and is an affiliate of Jefferson Public Radio, airing JPR's "News & Information" service, consisting of news and talk programming.
