= KSYC (AM) =

- Yreka, California; United States
- Frequency: 1490 kHz

Ownership
- Owner: Southern Oregon University

History
- First air date: July 27, 1947
- Last air date: July 19, 2022
- Call sign meaning: Siskiyou County

Technical information
- Facility ID: 15313
- Class: C
- Power: 1,000 watts
- Transmitter coordinates: 41°43′20.0″N 122°38′36.5″W
- Translator: 97.9 K250BX (Yreka)

KSYC (1490 AM) was a Jefferson Public Radio affiliate radio station based in Yreka, California. It was an affiliate of Jefferson Public Radio's "News & Information" service.

== History ==
The station was founded and licensed on September 2, 1947, by the Siskiyou County Broadcasting Company and signed on the air as a country music station, which had been Yreka's radio staple for many years. On August 15, 1960, the station was sold to Northern Broadcasting Company and its format slowly evolved to one of "middle of the road", with polkas being heard regularly in the mid 1960s through early 1970s. From the mid-1960s until the mid-1970s, KSYC would play top 40 music during evening hours. The studio was located at the transmitter site, several blocks from downtown Yreka.

On February 28, 1974, it was sold to Gary Hawk from the Los Angeles, California, area, d.b.a. Dalmatian Enterprises, Inc., and sometime later Gary added the FM station KYRE-FM.

KSYC was one of the stations sold to Siskiyou Radio Partners, Inc. in 1995, owned by Tom Huth and Bob Darling. The call letters remained the same, but the format was moved to the FM band at 103.9 MHz, now known as "The Country Station". The station was then sold to Four Rivers Broadcasting, who also purchased KMJC, KMJC-FM, KSYC-FM and then KWHO in 2001. Two years later, Jefferson Public Radio acquired both KMJC and KSYC from Four Rivers.

Effective June 10, 2016, the licenses for KSYC and six other stations in California and Oregon were transferred by JPR Foundation to Southern Oregon University.

KSYC left the air July 19, 2022. The Federal Communications Commission cancelled the station’s license on April 29, 2024.
