= Beaughton Creek =

Stream in California, United States

Coordinates: 41°27′35″N 122°26′17″W

Beaughton Creek is a stream located in the U.S. state of California. A tributary of the Shasta River, it is located in Siskiyou County.
