= Siskiyou County Superior Court =

California superior court with jurisdiction over Siskiyou County

Superior Court of California, County of Siskiyou
- Interactive map of Superior Court of California, County of Siskiyou
- 41.73021°N 122.63835°W
- Established: 1853
- Jurisdiction: Siskiyou County, California
- Location: Yreka
- Coordinates: 41.73021°N 122.63835°W
- Appeals to: California Court of Appeal for the Third District
- Website: siskiyou.courts.ca.gov

Presiding Judge
- Currently: Hon. John W. Lawrence

Assistant Presiding Judge
- Currently: Hon. Thomas John Linville II

Court Executive Officer
- Currently: Reneé McCanna-Crane

The Superior Court of California, County of Siskiyou, informally known as the Siskiyou County Superior Court, is the California superior court with jurisdiction over Siskiyou County.

== History ==
Siskiyou County was partitioned from Shasta and Klamath Counties in 1852; the county seat was Yreka City, then called Shasta Butte City.

After its formation, Siskiyou County was assumed to be part of the Ninth District, where its parent county (Shasta) remained; however, court was not convened in Siskiyou until 1853, when it was moved to the Eighth District, held by Hon. Joseph Montgomery Peters. Peters was succeeded by Judges William P. Daingerfield (1858–64), E. Garter (1864–70), A.M. Rosborough (1870–80), and Elijah Steele (1880+).

The first temporary courtroom was rented on the upper floor of a building in Yreka on Miner Street, near Main, with the county offices on the ground floor. In 1854, a fire destroyed the sheriff's office and a brick structure was built to replace it; at around the same time, a new building was built on Fourth, and court operations moved there. The county board of supervisors advertised for bids in early 1856 to build a brick courthouse, and awarded the contract to A. Witherall on April 1 for $15,479. The courthouse was built "in the center of the public square ... at equal distances from the outsides, the ends or fronts of said building to face Fourth and Oregon streets". It was formally accepted on April 18, 1857, at a final cost of $16,779.

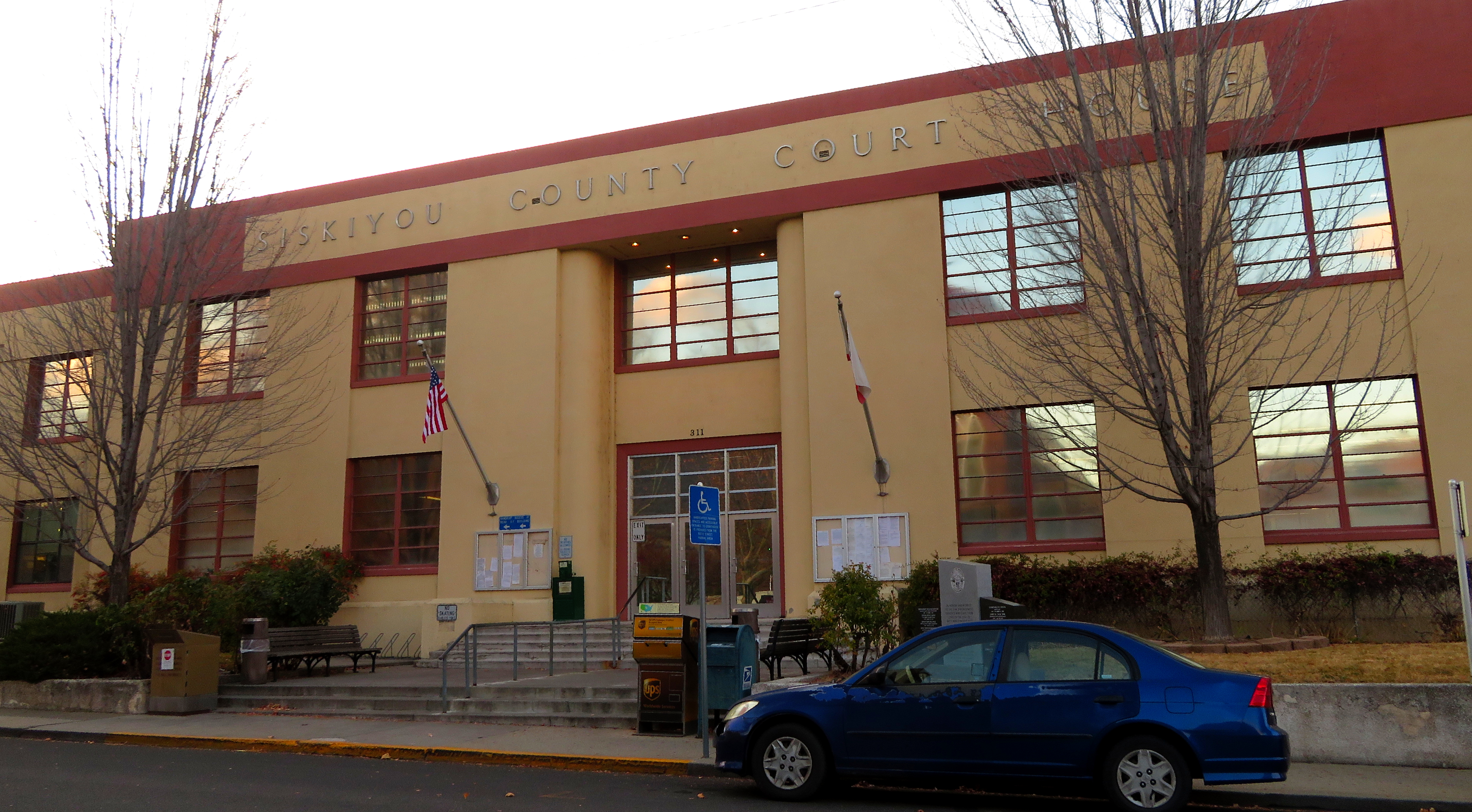
1954 eastern addition, 311 Fourth

The original building from 1857 remained in service until 2021, albeit with expansions and wings added in 1885 and 1896–97; a large concrete addition was built from 1953 to 1954 on the east side facing Fourth. The original building was designed by R.L. Westbrook and H.T. Shepherd; the later 19th century additions were designed by W.J. Bennet, and the 1954 concrete addition was designed by Robert J. Keeney. Its setback from the street was credited with saving it from fires. The 1857 courthouse also was noted for having "significant security deficiencies" and routinely flooded during heavy rains. Construction of a new Siskiyou Superior Courthouse began in March 2019, with funding from SB 1407 (Sep 2008), and was completed in June 2021, next to the prior courthouse complex. The first date of occupancy for the new building, with 67,459 ft^{2} (6,267.1 m^{2}) of space on 2.4 acres (0.97 ha) of land, was June 14.
