= KWCA (FM) =

Coordinates: 40.6540°N 122.5211°W

- Palo Cedro, California; United States
- Broadcast area: Redding, California
- Frequency: 101.1 MHz
- Branding: Jefferson Public Radio

Programming
- Format: Classical music

Ownership
- Owner: Southern Oregon University

History
- First air date: September 30, 2009

Technical information
- Licensing authority: FCC
- Facility ID: 86670
- Class: C2
- ERP: 4,900 watts
- HAAT: 450 meters (1,480 ft)

Links
- Public license information: Public file; LMS
- Webcast: Listen live
- Website: www.ijpr.org

KWCA (101.1 FM) is a radio station licensed to Palo Cedro, California. The station is owned by the Southern Oregon University, and is an affiliate of Jefferson Public Radio, airing JPR's "Classics & News" service, consisting of news and classical music programming.
