= Siskiyou Daily News =

Newspaper in Yreka, California

- Type: Daily newspaper
- Format: Broadsheet
- Owner: USA Today Co.
- Founder: B.H. Evans
- Publisher: Amy Lanier
- Editor: Skye Kinkade
- Founded: 1878 (as Scott Valley News)
- Language: English
- Headquarters: 309 South Broadway, Yreka, California 96097, United States
- ISSN: 1094-9763
- OCLC number: 28683624
- Website: www.siskiyoudaily.com

The Siskiyou Daily News is a daily newspaper serving Yreka, California, United States. It is owned by USA Today Co. Former owner GateHouse Media acquired the paper from Hollinger in 1997. The paper was founded in 1878 as the Scott Valley News by B.H. Evans.

== History ==
In August 1878, B. H. Evans published the first issue of the Scott Valley News in Fort Jones, California. At some point Frank Norcross became an owner and sold his stake to his partner Samuel P. Curtis in September 1879. A year later Ed. S. Culver bought a half-interest. Culver retired and was succeeded by Frank Markey on Jan. 1, 1883. In May 1886, Curtis skipped town. He left for Ukiah, taking all the business' available funds and leaving it $500 in debt. Markey struggled to run the paper on his own and decided to close it that August due to financial problems.

About four months later, L.D. Clark, founder of the Oroville Mercury, relaunched the News. Clark continued to operate the paper in Fort Jones and invented an automatic hand-press frisket to improve production. He got it patented it in December 1891. The Scientific American published an article on Clark's device a year later. In May, 1894, Clark sold the paper to E. H. Ellsworth. In June 1895, J. N. Bohen joined Ellsworth as a co-owner and the two moved the Scott Valley News to Yreka and changed its name to the Siskiyou News. In 1897, their partnership dissolved and Bohen exited. In 1898, W. J. Balfrey bought the News for $2,150.

Ten days after selling the paper Ellsworth was stopped by Constable E. E. Dixon while attempting to board a train in Montague with his family to San Francisco. At the time Ellsworth was being sued for libel by local citizens and for unpaid wages from an employee. He posted bail but another warrant for his arrest was issued stemming from another libel case. Ellsworth refused to be detained and shot Dixon, who later died from his injuries. Ellsworth was later found guilty of second-degree murder and sentenced to 21 years imprisonment.

In 1900, W. S. O'Brien paid Balfrey $2,850 for the business. A year later W. D. Crow bought the paper from O'Brien. Crow sold it in 1905 to brothers Frank E. and Horace Holbrook, former owners of the Times-Index. Horace sold out to his brother two years later. In 1923, Frank Holbrook sold the News to Herbert G. Moody, who had been editor The Searchlight in Redding. At that time the News had a 2,000 circulation and 17 paid correspondents. The Redding paper was owned by Moody's father, which he sold to his son in 1925. In 1929, H. G. Moody sold the News to his father H.L. Moody. A year later business was acquired by the Siskiyou Publishing Company for $18,000.

On Oct. 2, 1941, the Siskiyou News, owned by Albert Wedin, and the Yreka Journal, owned by Walter B. Stafford and William G. Bailey, were merged to form a daily called the Siskiyou Daily News. In 1948, Wedin sold the Daily News to E. Glenn Drake, who was succeeded as publisher in 1951 by Edgar J. Foss. At that time business operations were moved to Turlock. In 1979, the chain Thomson Newspapers Inc. bought the paper from Foss. The company owned more than 100 papers by 1993 when it sold the Daily News and four others to Hollinger.

In 1997, the Daily News was among the 167 papers acquired by Leonard Green & Partners from Hollinger for $310 million. A year later the investment firm formed Liberty Group Publishing to manage its publications. In June 2005, Fortress Investment Group bought Liberty for $527 million. The company was then renamed to GateHouse Media. In 2019, GateHouse merged with Gannett.
