= KHEC =

- Crescent City, California; United States
- Frequency: 91.1 MHz
- Branding: Jefferson Public Radio

Programming
- Format: Classical music

Ownership
- Owner: Southern Oregon University

History
- First air date: 2011

Technical information
- Licensing authority: FCC
- Facility ID: 176094
- Class: A
- ERP: 125 watts
- HAAT: 54 meters (177 ft)
- Transmitter coordinates: 41°45′26″N 124°12′02″W

Links
- Public license information: Public file; LMS
- Webcast: Listen live
- Website: www.ijpr.org

KHEC (91.1 FM) is a radio station licensed to Crescent City, California, United States. The station is currently owned by Southern Oregon University.
