= Grant Brisbee =

American sports writer and editor

Grant Brisbee (born October 31, 1977) is an American sports writer and editor. He is the founder of McCovey Chronicles, a San Francisco Giants-focused site, and served as its lead writer from 2005 until 2018. From 2011–19, he served as a national baseball writer for SB Nation. Since 2019, he is a staff writer covering the Giants for The Athletic. He graduated from San José State University with a B.A. in English/Career Writing in 2009.

== Career ==
Brisbee grew up in Burlingame, California and started his writing career at Southern Oregon University, where he wrote for the Siskiyou, the university's newspaper.

Brisbee began writing about the San Francisco Giants in the alt.sports.baseball.sf-giants Usenet group in the late 1990s. He started his first Giants blog, "Waiting for Boof", in January 2003. He launched McCovey Chronicles in January 2005 as the second blog under the SB Nation umbrella, which now maintains over 300 sports-related blogs. Brisbee started writing nationally for SB Nation in 2011. In 2018, he stepped back from day-to-day operations of McCovey Chronicles to focus on national baseball writing. In 2019, he left SB Nation to resume writing about the Giants for The Athletic.

Brisbee has been featured multiple times as a Giants correspondent for MLB Now on MLB Network. He is an occasional guest on KNBR radio. In 2015, Brisbee was awarded the SABR Analytics Conference Research Award in the "Contemporary Baseball Commentary" category for his article "Rumors, rumors, every where, nor any drop to drink" about his experience at the 2014 Baseball Winter Meetings. From 2017 through 2018, Brisbee co-hosted Giants Outsiders on NBC Sports Bay Area, a live 30-minute Giants post-game show.

In 2012, Brisbee correctly predicted a four-game sweep by the San Francisco Giants in the 2012 World Series, in contrast to the other writers polled by SB Nation, who all predicted a Detroit Tigers victory.
