= KSJK =

- Talent, Oregon; United States
- Broadcast area: Medford, Oregon
- Frequency: 1230 kHz

Programming
- Format: Public radio and talk
- Network: Jefferson Public Radio
- Affiliations: NPR; APM; PRX

Ownership
- Owner: Southern Oregon University

History
- First air date: October 23, 1960
- Former call signs: KRVC (1960–1973); KDOV (1973–1989)
- Former frequencies: 1350 kHz (1960–1983)

Technical information
- Licensing authority: FCC
- Facility ID: 62157
- Class: C
- Power: 1,000 watts (unlimited)
- Transmitter coordinates: 42°13′41.3″N 122°44′47.3″W

Links
- Public license information: Public file; LMS
- Webcast: Listen live
- Website: www.ijpr.org

KSJK (1230 AM) is a non-commercial educational radio station licensed to Talent, Oregon, United States. The station is owned by Southern Oregon University, and is an affiliate of Jefferson Public Radio. It is the flagship of JPR's "News & Information" service, consisting of news and talk programming.

KSJK signed on as KRVC in 1961 as a 1,000-watt, daytime-only outlet on 1350 kHz, licensed to Ashland, Oregon. It was owned by Faith Tabernacle, Inc. In 1973, the station became KDOV. In 1983 it was authorized to move to 1230 kHz and to change the city of license to Talent. In 1989, the current KSJK call letters were put in place.

The station's broadcast equipment was destroyed in the Almeda Drive Fire on September 8, 2020, forcing the signal off the air for a while.
