= KMJC =

Radio station in Mount Shasta, California

Currently silent
- Mount Shasta, California; United States
- Broadcast area: Serves Siskiyou County and Redding Metro Area
- Frequency: 620 kHz (HD Radio)
- Branding: Jefferson Public Radio

Programming
- Format: Public radio; News/Talk
- Affiliations: National Public Radio, Public Radio International

Ownership
- Owner: Southern Oregon University

History
- First air date: 1947 (as KWSD at 1340)
- Former call signs: KWSD (1947–1995)
- Former frequencies: 1340 kHz (1947–1958)

Technical information
- Licensing authority: FCC
- Facility ID: 60024
- Class: D
- Power: 1,000 watts (day); 29 watts (night)
- Transmitter coordinates: 41°19′8.6″N 122°18′39″W
- Translator: 93.1 K226CO (Mount Shasta)

Links
- Public license information: Public file; LMS
- Webcast: Listen live
- Website: ijpr.org

KMJC (620 AM) is a radio station broadcasting a public radio format. Licensed to Mount Shasta, California, United States, the station is currently owned by Southern Oregon University.

== History ==
The station, founded in 1947 by David Rees, Sr. of the Shasta Cascade Broadcasting Corporation, signed on the air June 12, 1947, as KWSD, broadcasting on 1340 kHz with 250 W of power. After the "K", the call letters originally stood for W (Weed) S (Shasta) D (Dunsmuir). The station aired various formats over the years, including rock, country and news talk. Rees had previously spent two decades with KMED in Medford, Oregon.

KWSD was the only station in the Mt. Shasta market until 1976, when a companion FM station, KEDY, went on the air. Station personalities through the years included Rees, his sons Dave Jr. and Jon, Dave Niles, Stephen Rizzo, Michael Killian, Jim Mourgos, Paul Whitney, Perry Sims, John Hart, Fred Gerding Jr., Timothy Harris, Mark Hickenbotham, Bill Craig, Dave Jr.'s son Dennis Rees, Brian Hembling and Robin Von. Programming varied from middle-of-the-road, to country, to rock, to various network and satellite programming. The AM station operated during daylight hours only at 1,000 non-directional watts with 500 pre-sunrise watts. By the 1990s, the AM station was allowed to broadcast after sundown at 29 watts.

KWSD was one of the stations sold to Siskiyou Radio Partners, Inc. in 1995, owned by Tom Huth and Bob Darling. The call letters were changed to KMJC, as was KEDY. KMJC's format was changed to news/talk. The station was then sold to Four Rivers Broadcasting, who also purchased KMJC-FM, KSYC, KSYC-FM and then KWHO in 2001. Two years later, Jefferson Public Radio, in association with Southern Oregon University, acquired both KMJC (AM) and KSYC (AM) from Four Rivers. Jefferson Public Radio and its programming covers far Northern California and Southern Oregon with an affiliation of small local stations.

Effective June 10, 2016, the licenses for KMJC and six other stations in California and Oregon were transferred by JPR Foundation to Southern Oregon University.
