= KHWA =

Coordinates: 41°13′20.2″N 122°17′54.5″W

- Weed, California; United States
- Broadcast area: Weed/Mount Shasta, California
- Frequency: 102.3 MHz
- Branding: JPR News and Information

Programming
- Format: Public radio; News/Talk
- Network: Jefferson Public Radio

Ownership
- Owner: Southern Oregon University
- Sister stations: KSYC-FM

History
- First air date: 1983 (as KSQU-FM)
- Former call signs: KSQU (1981–1984); KWHO (1984–2003); KNTK (2003–2008); KCWH (2008–2012); KSIZ (2012–2019)

Technical information
- Licensing authority: FCC
- Facility ID: 68152
- Class: C1
- Power: 15,500 watts
- HAAT: 592 meters
- Translators: 99.3 K257CA (Mount Shasta); 101.7 K269AT (Grenada)

Links
- Public license information: Public file; LMS
- Webcast: Listen live
- Website: www.ijpr.org

KHWA (102.3 FM) is a non-commercial radio station based in Mount Shasta, California (city of license is Weed, California), owned by Southern Oregon University and operated by Jefferson Public Radio, which also owns KSYC-FM in Yreka. KHWA broadcasts to the Siskiyou County and Redding markets, and has one of the largest geographical reaches of any FM station Northern California. The station last played an adult hits format as a commercial station.

== History ==
The station first signed on the air in 1983 as KSQU, in Weed, California. It was later purchased in 1984 by Tom Erickson of Lake Havasu City, Arizona, moved to Mount Shasta and renamed KWHO. The station was one of two country music radio stations in Siskiyou County and the first to broadcast country music on the FM band in the market.

KWHO was sold to Huth Broadcasting in 1997 and the format was changed to adult contemporary. Then the station was flipped to Four Rivers Broadcasting, which already owned KSYC-AM, KSYC-FM, KMJC, and KMJC-FM. The format remained until 2003 when the news talk format moved from the AM stations to KWHO. The call sign was changed to KNTK in 2004.

On August 1, 2008, KNTK — along with sister station KSYC-FM in Yreka — was sold to Jamison-Wolf Broadcasting. The new owners changed the station's format from news/talk to classic hits. In December 2008, the call sign was again changed, this time to KCWH.

On August 1, 2009, Jamison-Wolf entered into an LMA (Local Marketing Agreement) with TRC Enterprises, LLC, a company owned and operated by long-time morning show host and Program Director Rick Martin. The LMA was a precursor to an outright purchase of the station pending FCC approval. The sale became official in late August 2009. Rick Martin had been on the air in the market for 20 straight years, longer than any other local personality.

Martin sold the station and translators K257CA and K269AT to Buffalo Broadcasting, LLC, owned by Mark and Cindy Baird, and on July 24, 2012, KCWH went silent (off the air). The sale to Buffalo Broadcasting was consummated on December 26, 2012, at a purchase price of $295,000. The station would return to the air as a classic rock station under the new call sign KSIZ at the same frequencies with Joe Kesterson as lead deejay and the new program director. Kesterson also hosted the evening show on KSYC from 2013 to 2017 before leaving the station to battle esophageal cancer.

On March 23, 2017, the broadcast tower collapsed, knocking the station off the air once again. The station went silent as of March 23, 2017, but returned to the air on November 1, 2017. On September 28, 2017, Joe Kesterson died after a lengthy battle with esophageal cancer.

On April 29, 2019, the station changed its call sign to KHWA. In 2021, the station once again went silent with no timetable for a return to the air. Sister station KSYC-FM was the lone Buffalo Broadcasting station to remain on the air until October 1, 2021.

Effective July 19, 2022, KHWA was officially purchased by Southern Oregon University and began broadcasting programming from Jefferson Public Radio.

== Translators ==
KHWA's signal is transmitted up and down the Interstate 5 corridor from Weed to Orland at 102.3, to Yreka at 101.7, and locally in Mount Shasta at 99.3, all on the FM band.

Call sign	Frequency	City of license	FID	ERP (W)	Class	FCC info
K257CA	99.3 FM	Mount Shasta, California	46742	52	D	LMS
K269AT	101.7 FM	Grenada, California	21748	7	D	LMS

== Local sports ==
KHWA was a longtime affiliate of the Oakland A's, and was the flagship station for Mount Shasta High School football with Rick Martin and the late Al Blackmore. It was also the flagship station for Mount Shasta High School basketball with Martin calling the action on a solo basis. It occasionally included Weed and Dunsmuir High School, and College of the Siskiyous games. The station was also home to Oregon State Beavers football games, as well as Sunday Night and Monday Night NFL Football games broadcast on Westwood One. However, due to the previous ownership change, it was uncertain whether or not local sports would return to the station. Due to the station's sale to JPR, no local sports will ever air.

== Past program directors ==
- Tom Erickson (1980s-1997 as KWHO)
- Mike Summers (1997-1999 as KWHO; now owner of Siskiyou Broadcast Group/SBG Radio and consultant for the AIF)
- Cal Hunter/Tom Huth (1997-2002 as KWHO; Hunter is now of KBLF-AM in Red Bluff, California)
- Rick Martin (2002-2008 as KNTK, 2009–2012 as KCWH)
- Lee Jamison (2008-2009 as KCWH)
- Joe Kesterson (2012–2017; died of esophageal cancer on September 28, 2017)

Chris Stevens 2019-2023 KHWA(Highway 102.3 FM)
