= Marco Grifantini =

American baseball player (born 1985)

- Pitcher
- Born: September 17, 1985 (age 41); Yreka, California, U.S.
- Bats: Right Throws: Right
- Stats at Baseball Reference
Medals
Men's baseball
Representing Italy
European Baseball Championship
Gold medal – first place	2010 Germany	National team

Marco M. Grifantini (born September 17, 1985) is an American professional baseball pitcher.

Grifantini attended Enterprise High School in Redding, California, and the University of California, Davis. He played for Cariparma Parma of the Italian Baseball League and the Italian national team in the 2013 World Baseball Classic. In the 2013 season, he plays for the Dunedin Blue Jays of the Class A-Advanced Florida State League.

== Baseball career ==
Grifantini began his baseball career at Enterprise High School in Redding, California. After attending Feather River College, where he received several league awards, he transferred to the University of California, Davis. During his tenure there, he played in the College World Series preliminary rounds held at Stanford University.

Following his graduation, Grifantini joined the Italian Baseball League. During his four-year stint in the Italian league, he was once able to win the titles of the Best Pitcher. During his career stay in Italy, he had the opportunity to represent the Italian National Baseball Team in international competitions played outside Italy.

Grifantini's latest entry was into the Italian team Cinderella that outplayed Mexico and Canada to advance to the second round of the World Baseball Classic. This victory by Cinderella triggered an offer for him from the Dunedin Blue Jays, the Class A-Advanced affiliate of the Toronto Blue Jays major league baseball club.
