= Pluto's Cave =

Cave in California, United States

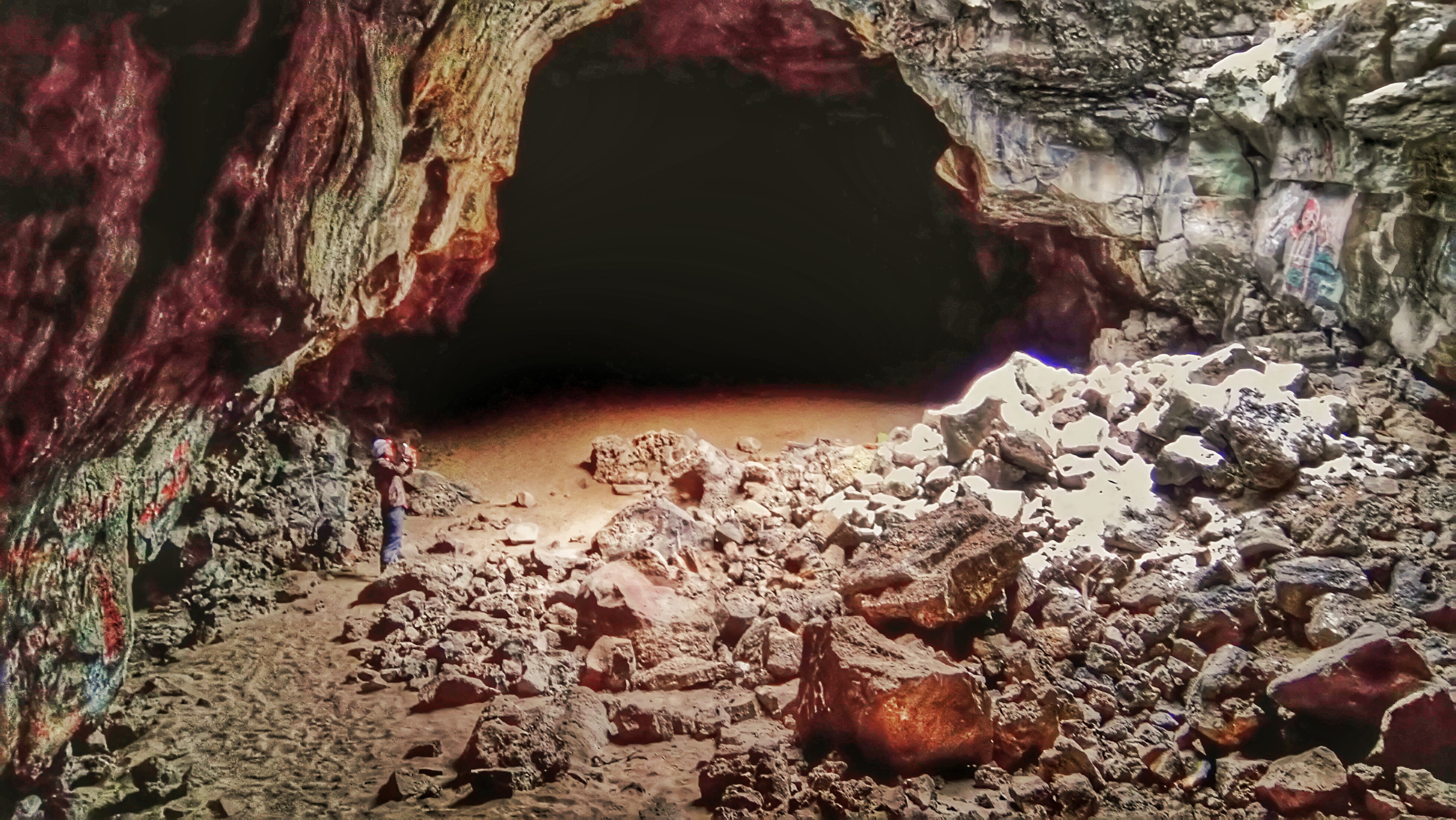
- Entrance to the cave

- Location within the United States
- Location: Klamath National Forest; Siskiyou County, California, United States
- Coordinates: 41.568012°N 122.282632°W
- Length: 0.5 to 1 mile (0.80 to 1.61 km)
- Discovery: 1863
- Geology: Lava tube

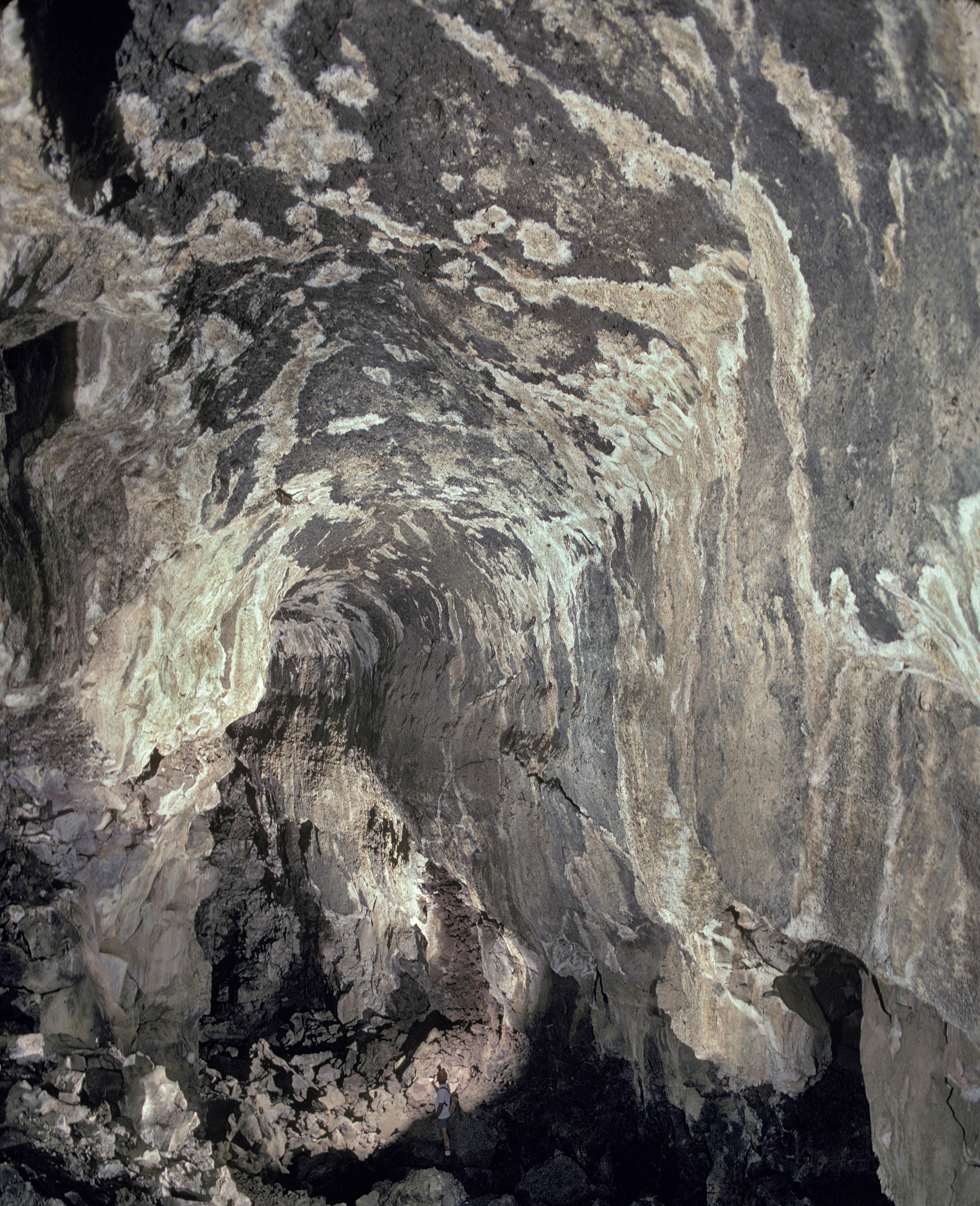
Plutos cave interior

Pluto's Cave (or Pluto Cave) is a partially collapsed lava tube on the northern outskirts of Mount Shasta in the Klamath National Forest. Its main entrance is located close to the 99-97 Cutoff c. 12 miles (19 km) North-east of Weed and c. 14 miles (23 km) East-southeast of Grenada. The tube is roughly 190,000 years old, which is quite old for a lava tube, as they normally collapse quickly (in geological terms), having ceilings only a few metres thick. However, Pluto's Cave is located in a semi-arid climate, where erosion is restricted, which contributes to its survival.

The cave was discovered in the spring of 1863 by Nelson Cash, who came upon it while looking for stray cattle. It was further explored in April 1863, and named "Pluto's Cave" after Pluto, the Greek God of the underworld.

William Henry Brewer assisted by Clarence King on a field trip for the California Division of Mines and Geology (predecessor of today's California Geological Survey), visited the cave on October 10, 1863. Brewer writes about it a month later on November 11:

October 10 in the morning we went to visit a cave about three-quarters of a mile distant, just discovered, and of which extraordinary stories were told. It was, indeed, quite a curiosity. It is called Pluto’s Cave. The surface of the country is a gentle lava slope, very rocky, with but little soil and with stunted cedars and bushes, the lava rising into innumerable hummocks a few feet high. Under this the cave extends. It looks as if the surface of the great lava flow had cooled, but that the crust had broken somewhere lower down and a long stream of the fluid had run out, leaving a long, empty channel or gallery. The roof of this gallery is beautifully arched—in places it is at least fifty feet high and as many broad. The bottom is of broken blocks of lava, and the sides are occasionally ornamented with fantastic shapes of stone, where the melted or viscous fluid has oozed through cracks, sometimes in a thick, black stream, like tar, then cooled, in others like froth on the surface of the molten mass—but all now cool enough, hard, rough, black rock. We went in near a mile, to the end, or at least to where the fallen fragments blocked up the way. Multitudes of bats lived in it, even to the very end. Near the entrance the roof had broken in in several places, and there were many skulls of mountain sheep that had got in and perished. These are the chamois of the Rocky Mountains and Sierra. They are nearer a goat than sheep, and have enormous horns, hence some hunters call them the "big horn." On one of these skulls the horns were 14 1/2 inches in circumference at the base and 33 inches between the tips.

— William Henry Brewer, "Book 4, Chapter 7", Up and Down California in 1860–1864 (1930)

King in 1870, now a director of the Geological Exploration of the Fortieth Parallel, returned to Mount Shasta, and with a fellow explorer revisited the cave, which King recounts in his 1872 book Mountaineering in the Sierra Nevada:

In 1863, in company with Professor Brewer, I visited this very region, and we were then shown an interesting tubular cavern lying directly under the surface of a lava plain.

Mr. Palmer and I revisited the spot, and, having tied our mules, descended through a circular hole to the cavern's mouth. An archway of black lava sixty feet wide by eighty high, with a floor of lava sand and rough boulders, led under the basalt in a northerly direction, preserving an incline not more than the gentle slope of the country. Our roof overhead could hardly have been more than twenty or thirty feet thick. We followed the cavern, which was a comparatively regular tube, for half or three quarters of a mile. Now and then the roof would open up in larger chambers, and the floor be cumbered with huge piles of lava, over which we scrambled, sometimes nearly reaching the ceiling. Fresh lava-froth and smooth blister-holes lined the sides. Innumerable bats and owls on silent wing floated by our candles, fanning an air singularly still and dense.

After a cautious scramble over a long pile of immense basalt blocks, we came to the end of the cave, and sat down upon piles of debris. We then repeated an experiment, formerly made by Brewer and myself, of blowing out our candle to observe the intense darkness, then firing a pistol that we might hear its dull, muffled explosion.

The formation of this cave, as explained in Professor Whitney's Geological Report, is this: A basalt stream, flowing down from Shasta, cooled and hardened upon the surface, while within the mass remained molten and fluid. From simple pressure the lava burst out at the lower end, and flowing forth left an empty tube. Wonderfully fresh and recent the whole confused rock-walls appeared, and we felt, as we walked and climbed back to the opening and to daylight, as if we had been allowed to travel back into the volcano age.

— Clarence King, "Shasta Flanks", Mountaineering in the Sierra Nevada (1872)

John Muir explored the Mount Shasta area in the winter of 1874–75, and includes the cave on his Shasta circumnavigation guide:

Regaining the low ground at the base of the mountain and holding on in your grand orbit, you pass through a belt of juniper woods, called "The Cedars," to Sheep Rock at the foot of the Shasta Pass. Here you strike the old emigrant road, which leads over the low divide to the eastern slopes of the mountain. In a north-northwesterly direction from the foot of the pass you may chance to find Pluto's Cave, already mentioned; but it is not easily found, since its several mouths are on a level with the general surface of the ground, and have been made simply by the falling-in of portions of the roof. Far the most beautiful and richly furnished of the mountain caves of California occur in a thick belt of metamorphic limestone that is pretty generally developed along the western flank of the Sierra from the McCloud River to the Kaweah, a distance of nearly four hundred miles. These volcanic caves are not wanting in interest, and it is well to light a pitch pine torch and take a walk in these dark ways of the underworld whenever opportunity offers, if for no other reason to see with new appreciation on returning to the sunshine the beauties that lie so thick about us.

— John Muir, "Shasta Rambles and Modoc Memories", Picturesque California and the Region West of the Rocky Mountains, from Alaska to Mexico (1888)

Evidence was found of its use by Pre-Columbian peoples. Visitors can safely hike into the cave about 1,200 feet (370 m).
