= Yreka, California =

City in California, United States

- City
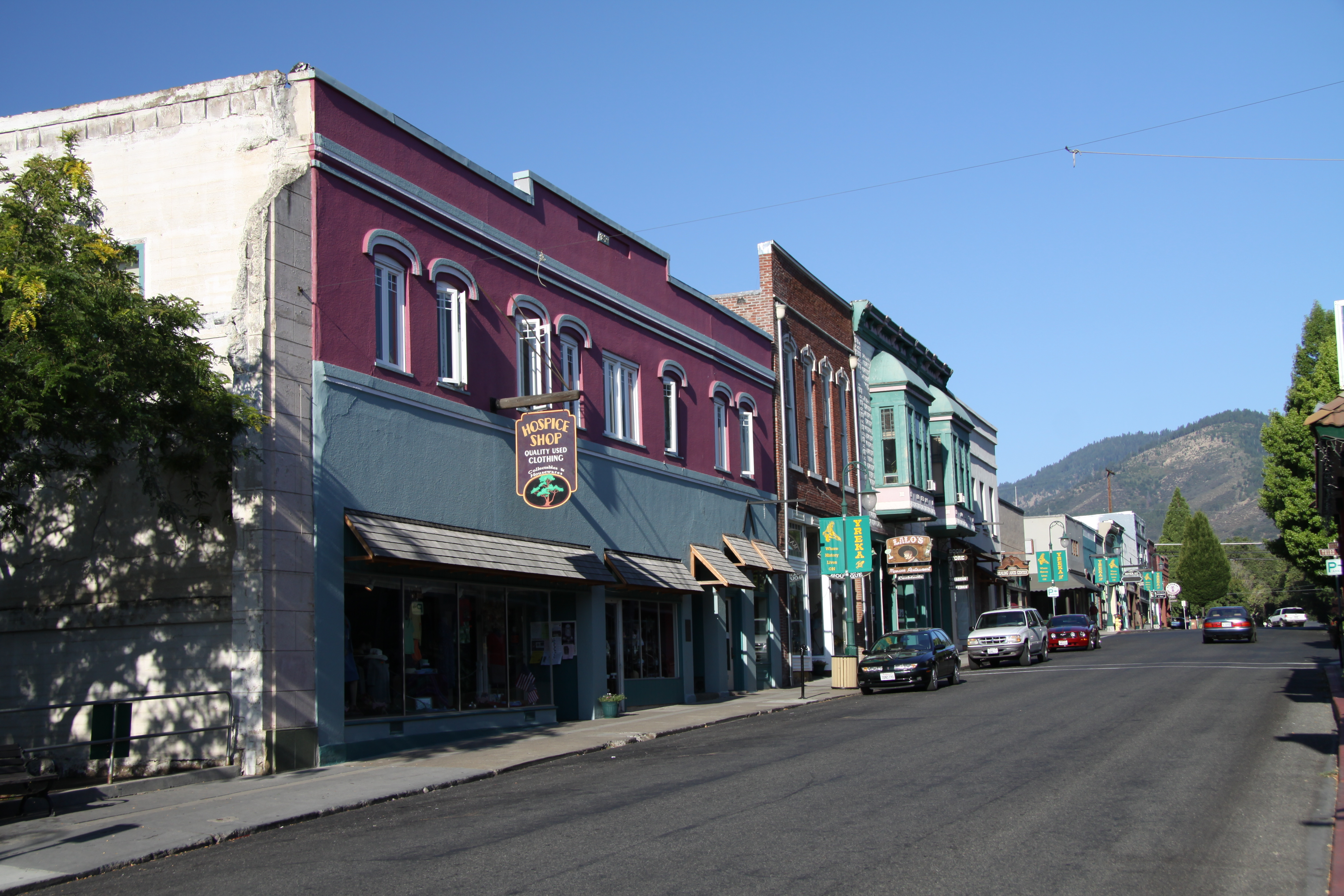
- Downtown Yreka in 2011
- Interactive map of Yreka, California
- Location in the United States Yreka (the United States)
- Coordinates: 41°43′36″N 122°38′15″W
- Country: United States
- State: California
- County: Siskiyou
- Incorporated: April 21, 1857

Government
  - Type: Council–manager

Area
  - Total: 10.06 sq mi (26.05 km^{2})
  - Land: 9.98 sq mi (25.86 km^{2})
  - Water: 0.073 sq mi (0.19 km^{2}) 0.72%
- Elevation: 2,589 ft (789 m)

Population (2020)
  - Total: 7,807
  - Density: 753/sq mi (290.7/km^{2})
- Time zone: UTC−8 (Pacific)
  - Summer (DST): UTC−7 (PDT)
- ZIP code: 96097
- Area code: 530
- FIPS code: 06-86944
- GNIS feature ID: 1652661
- Website: ci.yreka.ca.us

Yreka (/waɪˈriːkə/ wy-REE-kə) is a city in and the county seat of Siskiyou County, California, United States, near the Shasta River and about 22 miles south of the state border with Oregon. The city has an area of about 10 square miles (26 km^{2}), most of it land. As of the 2020 census, its population was 7,807, reflecting an increase from 7,765 in the 2010 census. Yreka is home to the College of the Siskiyous, Klamath National Forest Interpretive Museum, and the Siskiyou County Museum. It was incorporated on April 21, 1857.

== History ==
In March 1851, Abraham Thompson, a mule train packer, discovered gold near Rocky Gulch while traveling along the Siskiyou Trail from southern Oregon. By April 1851, 2,000 miners had arrived in "Thompson's Dry Diggings" to test their luck, and by June 1851, a gold rush "boomtown" of tents, shanties, and a few rough cabins had sprung up. Several name changes occurred until the city was called Yreka. The name comes from wáik'a, a word meaning "north mountain" or "white mountain", the name of nearby Mount Shasta in the Shasta language.

Mark Twain tells a different story:

[Twain's mentor Bret] Harte had arrived in California in the [eighteen-]fifties, twenty-three or twenty-four years old, and had wandered up into the surface diggings of the camp at Yreka, a place which had acquired its mysterious name – when in its first days it much needed a name – through an accident. There was a bakeshop with a canvas sign which had not yet been put up but had been painted and stretched to dry in such a way that the word BAKERY, all but the B, showed through and was reversed. A stranger read it wrong end first, YREKA, and supposed that that was the name of the camp. The campers were satisfied with it and adopted it.

In 1853–54, poet Joaquin Miller described Yreka as a bustling place with "a tide of people up and down and across other streets, as strong as if a city on the East Coast". Incorporation proceedings were completed on April 21, 1857.

=== Lynchings ===
Two lynchings have been documented in Yreka. The first took place on August 26, 1895, when four men—William Null, Garland Stemler, Luis Moreno, and Lawrence Johnson—awaiting trial for various charges of murder and robbery, were simultaneously hanged by a lynch mob from a railroad tie suspended from two adjacent trees.

The second lynching occurred on July 28, 1935. Clyde Johnson and Robert Miller Barr robbed a local business and its patrons in Castella, California. They then stole a car from a patron and drove north to Dunsmuir, California, where they planned to abandon the car and make a getaway by train. Soon after they abandoned the car north of Dunsmuir, they were stopped by California Highway Patrolman George "Molly" Malone and Dunsmuir's 38-year-old honorary Chief of Police Frank R. "Jack" Daw. Johnson pulled out a Luger pistol and wounded both policemen. Malone recovered, but Daw died the next day. Johnson was caught a few hours later by a dragnet and taken into custody. Barr, who was holding the $35 that they obtained from the robbery, panicked during the shootout and ran off into the woods, then escaped on a freight train. Daw was a beloved figure in Dunsmuir. His title of chief of police was given to him because of his cool head and experience as a World War I veteran. The night of Daw's funeral, a dozen cars from Dunsmuir, carrying roughly 50 masked men, drove north to Yreka to lynch Johnson. On August 3, 1935, at 1:30 am, the vigilante mob reached the Yreka jail and lightly knocked on the door. Deputy Marin Lange, the only guard on duty at the jail, opened the door slightly and was quickly overtaken. He was driven 9 miles east of Yreka, where he was released, barefoot. The mob searched the jail, found Johnson, drove him away in one of the cars, and hanged him from a pine tree. Barr was arrested over a year later, on September 4, 1936, in Los Angeles on a burglary charge. During his time on the run, he secured a part as an extra in the Nelson Eddy and Jeanette MacDonald film Rose Marie, scenes of which were filmed near Lake Tahoe. He is credited in the film under his real name.

=== Yreka rebellion ===
On November 27, 1941, a group of young men gained national media attention when, brandishing hunting rifles for dramatic effect, they stopped traffic on U.S. Route 99 south of Yreka, and handed out copies of a Proclamation of Independence, stating that the State of Jefferson was in "patriotic rebellion against the States of California and Oregon" and would continue to "secede every Thursday until further notice."

The secession movement ended quickly, though not before Del Norte County District Attorney John Leon Childs of Crescent City was inaugurated as governor of the State of Jefferson on December 4, 1941.

The first blow was the death of Mayor Gable on December 2, followed by the attack on Pearl Harbor on December 7. Those in favor of secession focused their efforts on the war effort, which crippled the movement.

== Geography ==
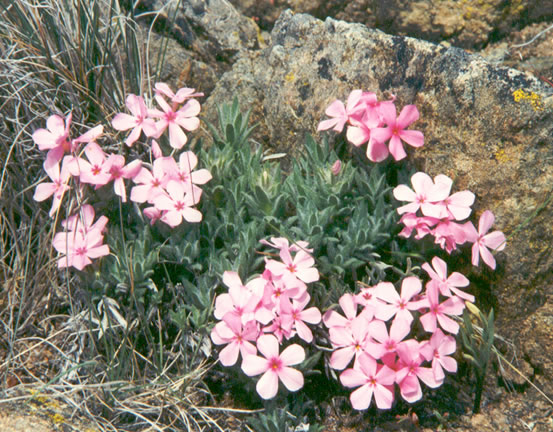
The Yreka phlox (Phlox hirsuta) is the city's official flower.

Yreka is about 2,500 feet (760 m) above sea level in the Shasta Valley, south of the Siskiyou Mountains and north of Mount Shasta, a 14,000 ft (4,300 m) dormant volcano that towers over the valley.

According to the United States Census Bureau, the city has an area of 10.1 sq mi (26 km^{2}), of which 0.1 sq mi (0.26 km^{2}) (0.72%) is covered by water.

=== Natural history ===
The official city flower of Yreka is the Yreka phlox (Phlox hirsuta).

The only known specimen of Calochortus monanthus, the single-flowered mariposa lily, was collected near Yreka along the banks of the Shasta River by botanist Edward Lee Greene in June 1876.

=== Nearby settlements ===
Nearby places include:

- Montague: 6.4 miles (10.3 km) east
- Grenada: 11.5 miles (18.5 km) southeast
- Fort Jones: 17.2 miles (27.7 km) southwest
- Klamath River: 24.3 miles (39.1 km) northwest
- Hornbrook: 15.1 miles (24.3 km) north

== Climate ==
Climate chart for Yreka

According to the Köppen climate classification, Yreka has a hot-summer Mediterranean climate (Csa), but almost qualifies as a warm-summer Mediterranean climate (Csb). The area features hot, dry summers and cool winters with regular snowfall. A high degree of diurnal temperature variation exists, especially in the summer.

The annual average temperature of Yreka is 53.5 °F (11.9 °C). July is the hottest month with 84.2 °F (29.0 °C), and December is the coldest month with 26.0 °F (−3.3 °C). The average annual precipitation is 18.92 inches (481 mm), and the precipitation in winter (December–February) accounts for almost 48% of the whole year. The wettest "rain year" was from July 2005 to June 2006 with 32.28 inches (819.9 mm), and the driest was from July 1954 to June 1955 with 7.08 inches (179.8 mm). The annual snowfall is 11.6 inches (0.29 m), which is basically concentrated from November to February of the next year.

The annual extreme temperature ranged from −11 °F (−23.9 °C) on January 20, 1937, January 22, 1937, February 2, 1950, and December 9, 1972, to 112 °F (44.4 °C) on July 16, 1925, July 17, 1925, and July 27, 1939; the record cold daily maximum is 11 °F (−11.7 °C), set on January 22, 1962, while, conversely, the record warm daily minimum is 80 °F (26.7 °C) on July 22 and 23, 1915. There are 66.6 afternoons each year with the highest temperature over 90 °F (32.2 °C), 11.4 afternoons with the highest temperature over 100 °F (37.8 °C), and 142.2 mornings with the lowest temperature below 32 °F (0 °C).

Climate data for Yreka, California (1991–2020 normals, extremes 1893–present)
Month	Jan	Feb	Mar	Apr	May	Jun	Jul	Aug	Sep	Oct	Nov	Dec	Year
Record high °F (°C)	66 (19)	74 (23)	81 (27)	96 (36)	103 (39)	109 (43)	112 (44)	110 (43)	107 (42)	95 (35)	79 (26)	66 (19)	112 (44)
Mean maximum °F (°C)	57.6 (14.2)	64.1 (17.8)	72.8 (22.7)	81.8 (27.7)	90.8 (32.7)	97.8 (36.6)	103.4 (39.7)	102.1 (38.9)	96.8 (36.0)	84.9 (29.4)	69.9 (21.1)	57.6 (14.2)	104.7 (40.4)
Mean daily maximum °F (°C)	46.1 (7.8)	51.7 (10.9)	58.1 (14.5)	64.3 (17.9)	73.9 (23.3)	82.9 (28.3)	93.0 (33.9)	92.2 (33.4)	84.4 (29.1)	69.7 (20.9)	53.9 (12.2)	44.9 (7.2)	67.9 (19.9)
Daily mean °F (°C)	36.7 (2.6)	40.4 (4.7)	45.2 (7.3)	50.4 (10.2)	58.6 (14.8)	65.8 (18.8)	74.2 (23.4)	73.0 (22.8)	65.7 (18.7)	53.7 (12.1)	42.5 (5.8)	36.0 (2.2)	53.5 (11.9)
Mean daily minimum °F (°C)	27.3 (−2.6)	29.0 (−1.7)	32.3 (0.2)	36.5 (2.5)	43.4 (6.3)	48.6 (9.2)	55.4 (13.0)	53.8 (12.1)	46.9 (8.3)	37.7 (3.2)	31.2 (−0.4)	27.1 (−2.7)	39.1 (3.9)
Mean minimum °F (°C)	14.6 (−9.7)	18.2 (−7.7)	21.5 (−5.8)	24.2 (−4.3)	29.4 (−1.4)	35.7 (2.1)	43.4 (6.3)	43.1 (6.2)	35.2 (1.8)	26.0 (−3.3)	19.0 (−7.2)	14.0 (−10.0)	10.6 (−11.9)
Record low °F (°C)	−11 (−24)	−11 (−24)	12 (−11)	17 (−8)	20 (−7)	26 (−3)	34 (1)	33 (1)	20 (−7)	7 (−14)	1 (−17)	−11 (−24)	−11 (−24)
Average precipitation inches (mm)	3.28 (83)	2.17 (55)	1.84 (47)	1.30 (33)	1.32 (34)	0.74 (19)	0.51 (13)	0.31 (7.9)	0.41 (10)	1.14 (29)	2.19 (56)	3.71 (94)	18.92 (481)
Average snowfall inches (cm)	4.3 (11)	2.6 (6.6)	0.4 (1.0)	0.2 (0.51)	0.0 (0.0)	0.0 (0.0)	0.0 (0.0)	0.0 (0.0)	0.0 (0.0)	0.0 (0.0)	1.5 (3.8)	2.6 (6.6)	11.6 (29)
Average precipitation days (≥ 0.01 inch)	13.2	9.9	11.1	8.8	8.0	4.3	2.9	2.0	2.0	5.0	10.6	12.8	90.6
Average snowy days (≥ 0.1 inch)	1.9	1.7	0.4	0.2	0.4	0.0	0.0	0.0	0.0	0.0	0.8	1.6	6.6
Source: NOAA

== Demographics ==
Historical population
Census	Pop.	Note	%±
1860	1,327		—
1870	1,063		−19.9%
1880	1,059		−0.4%
1890	1,100		3.9%
1900	1,254		14.0%
1910	1,134		−9.6%
1920	1,277		12.6%
1930	2,126		66.5%
1940	2,485		16.9%
1950	3,227		29.9%
1960	4,759		47.5%
1970	5,394		13.3%
1980	5,916		9.7%
1990	6,948		17.4%
2000	7,290		4.9%
2010	7,765		6.5%
2020	7,807		0.5%
2024 (est.)	7,686	▼	−1.5%
U.S. Decennial Census

=== 2020 census ===
As of the 2020 census, Yreka had a population of 7,807 and a population density of 781.9 inhabitants per square mile (301.9/km^{2}). The median age was 41.1 years. The age distribution was 22.9% under 18, 7.2% from 18 to 24, 23.3% from 25 to 44, 23.9% from 45 to 64, and 22.7% were 65 or older. For every 100 females, there were 89.9 males, and for every 100 females 18 and over, there were 86.1 males 18 and over.

The census reported that 97.9% of the population lived in households, 0.9% lived in noninstitutionalized group quarters, and 1.2% were institutionalized. Of the 3,368 households, 27.3% had children under 18, 35.3% were married-couple households, 8.5% were cohabiting-couple households, 19.9% had a male householder with no spouse or partner present, and 36.3% had a female householder with no spouse or partner present. About 36.8% of households were made up of individuals, and 19.5% had someone living alone who was 65 or older. The average household size was 2.27, and 1,881 families represented 55.8% of all households.

The 3,668 housing units had an average density of 367.4 units per square mile (141.9 units/km^{2}), of which 8.2% were vacant and 91.8% were occupied. Of occupied units, 50.8% were owner-occupied, and 49.2% were occupied by renters. The homeowner vacancy rate was 2.4%, and the rental vacancy rate was 6.7%; 94.0% of residents lived in urban areas, while 6.0% lived in rural areas.

Racial composition as of the 2020 census
Race	Number	Percentage
White	5,643	72.3%
Black or African American	73	0.9%
American Indian and Alaska Native	700	9.0%
Asian	149	1.9%
Native Hawaiian and other Pacific Islander	10	0.1%
Some other race	257	3.3%
Two or more races	975	12.5%
Hispanic or Latino (of any race)	958	12.3%

=== 2023 estimates ===
In 2023, the US Census Bureau estimated that 1.7% of the population were foreign-born. Of all people aged 5 or older, 92.4% spoke only English at home, 6.5% spoke Spanish, 0.7% spoke other Indo-European languages, 0.2% spoke Asian or Pacific Islander languages, and 0.3% spoke other languages. Of those 25 or older, 89.0% were high-school graduates and 19.4% had a bachelor's degree.

The median household income was $42,664, and the per capita income was $29,389. About 17.4% of families and 22.0% of the population were below the poverty line.

== Economy ==
- West Miner Street-Third Street District
- U.S. National Register of Historic Places
- U.S. Historic district
- California Historical Landmark
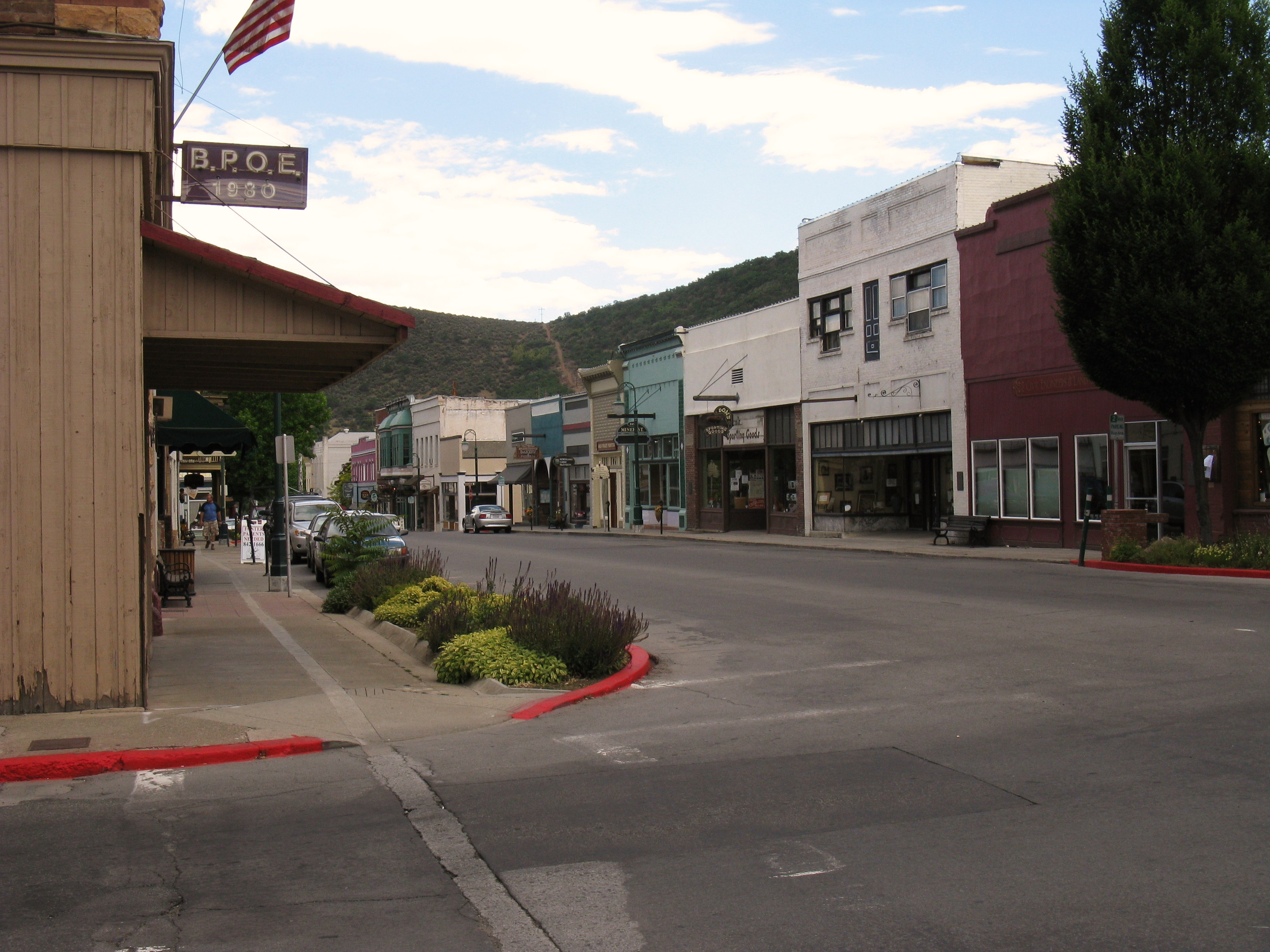
- West Miner Street in Yreka
- Built: 1854–1900
- NRHP reference No.: 72000258
- CHISL No.: 901

Significant dates
- Added to NRHP: December 11, 1972
- Designated CHISL: 1976

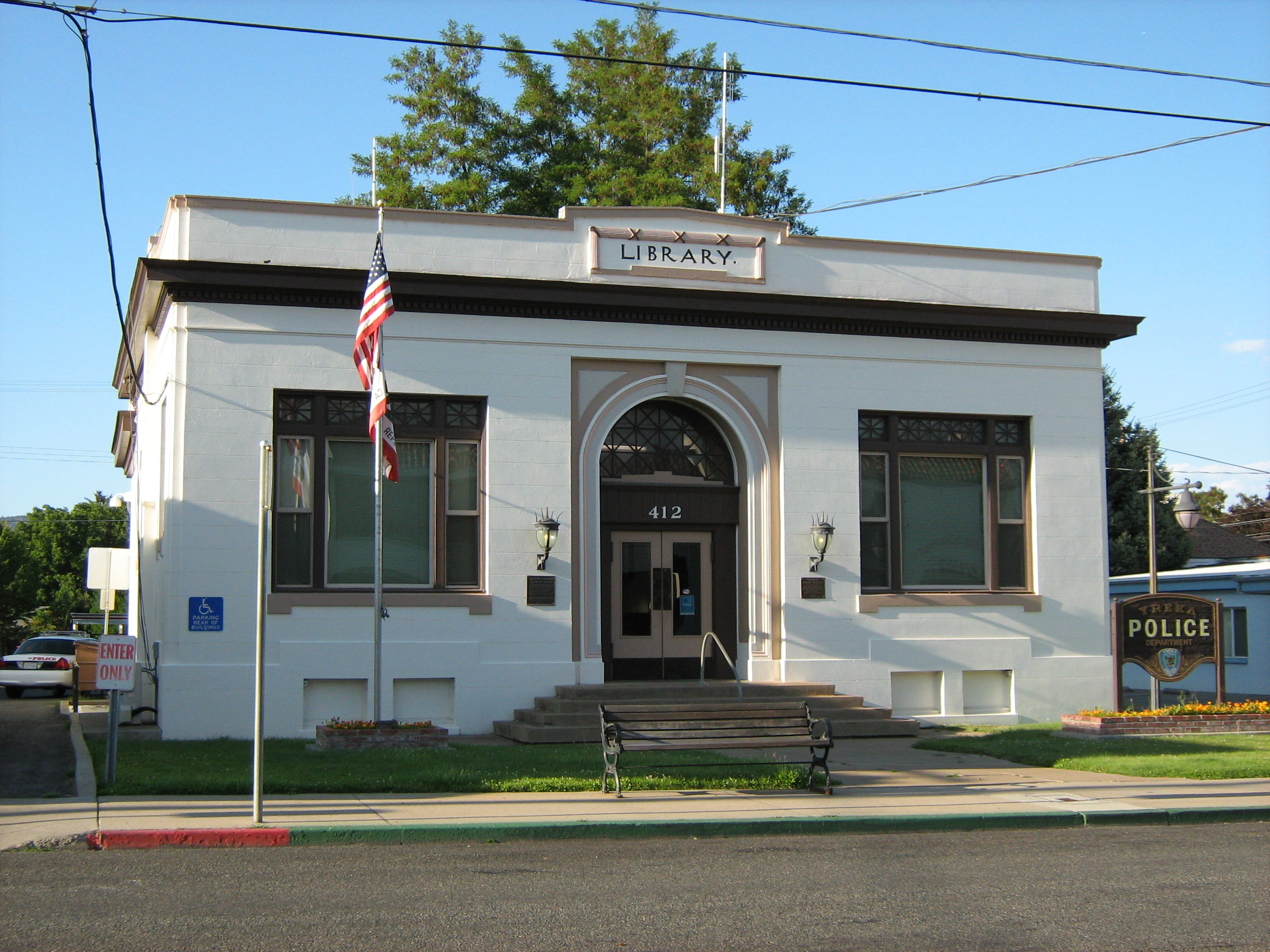
Yreka's Carnegie Library, designed by W. H. Weeks, is currently used as the city's police department.

Tourists visit Yreka because it is at the northern edge of the Shasta Cascade area of Northern California. The core of the historic downtown, along West Miner Street, is listed as a historic district on the National Register of Historic Places, as well as a California Historical Landmark. Yreka is home to the Siskiyou County Museum and a number of Gold Rush-era monuments and parks. Visitors also come to enjoy trout fishing in the nearby Klamath, Sacramento and McCloud Rivers, or to see and climb Mount Shasta, Castle Crags or the Trinity Alps. Visitors also ski (both alpine and cross-country), or bike or hike to the waterfalls, streams, and lakes in the area, including nearby Falls of the McCloud River, Burney Falls, Mossbrae Falls, Lake Siskiyou, Castle Lake, and Shasta Lake.

The town hosts Gold Rush Days every year in June.

In addition, because it is the county seat of Siskiyou County, a number of businesses related to the county courts, county recorder, and other official county functions are in the city. Butte Valley National Grassland is in northern Siskiyou County, near the Oregon border, but is administered from Yreka offices.

== Government ==
In the state legislature Yreka is in the 1st senatorial district, represented by Republican Megan Dahle, and the 1st Assembly district, represented by Republican Heather Hadwick.

Federally, Yreka is in California's 1st congressional district, represented by Republican James Gallagher.

== Education ==
Yreka is home to a branch campus of the College of the Siskiyous which hosts the Rural Health Science Institute and Administration of Justice programs. The college is one of 10 California community colleges to offer on-campus housing. High-school buses carry students from towns that would not otherwise be able to fund a secondary education.

In Yreka, the gold-mining era is commemorated with a gold museum, as well as with a remnant of a silver-mining operation in Greenhorn Park. The Yreka Union High School District sports mascot is a gold miner. School colors are red and gold. Yreka High School was the first high school in the county, founded in 1894. It has 11 feeder districts that serve the approximately 1,200 square miles (3,100 km^{2}) county area.

The Yreka elementary school district is composed of Evergreen Elementary and the Jackson Street Middle School.

== Local media ==
- KSYC-AM 1490 Jefferson Public Radio, Yreka (silent as of 2022)
- KSYC-FM 103.9 Jefferson Public Radio, Yreka
- KZRO-FM 100.1 Mount Shasta
- KKLC 107.9 K-LOVE, Fall River Mills
- KSQU Mount Shasta/KEDY Fort Jones/KYRE Yreka, Internet Radio (Siskiyou Broadcast Group)
- Siskiyou Country Radio (Internet Radio), Yreka
- Siskiyou Daily News
- Vyve Broadband
- YCTV 4 Yreka Community Television/Siskiyou Media Council
- KSQU-TV Channel 8Y (Internet Television) Yreka/Mount Shasta (Siskiyou Broadcast Group)

== Infrastructure ==
=== Transportation ===
Interstate 5 is the primary north–south route through Yreka, connecting Redding and Sacramento to the south and the Oregon border to the north. Interstate 5 through the city follows the former path of the Siskiyou Trail, which stretched from California's Central Valley to Oregon's Willamette Valley.

California State Route 3 runs east to Montague, and west to Fort Jones and Weaverville. California State Route 263 serves as a business loop of Interstate 5 through the northern part of the city.

General aviation uses the Montague Airport in Montague, 6 miles (9.7 km) to the east.

== Public transportation ==
Siskiyou transit (STAGE), Route 1 – Cascade Flyer (Express), services Yreka three times daily going thru Mt Shasta and Dunsmuir.

== Notable people ==
- Erik Bennett, Major League Baseball player, was born in Yreka.
- Charles Earl Bowles, a.k.a. Black Bart, robbed a number of stagecoaches on the trails leading to or from Yreka in the 1880s.
- Leander Clark, an Iowa state legislator and Union Army officer, prospected for gold in the Yreka area, returning home to the east coast via the Isthmus of Panama in 1852, $3,000 to $4,000 richer.
- Edward Silsby Farrington, United States federal judge, was born in Yreka.
- Marco Grifantini, baseball player, was born in Yreka.
- William Irwin, Siskiyou representative and later governor of California.
- Ross McCloud was Siskiyou County surveyor in the middle 1850s and laid out for improvement many of the trails and road courses still in use today.
- Patrick F. McManus was a sutler killed in the Yreka area while hauling mail.
- Tim Meamber, American football player, was born in Yreka.
- Richie Myers, baseball player, was a resident of Yreka when he died there.
- John Otto was the first park custodian at Colorado National Monument and was a key advocate for its creation and its later inclusion in the National Park System. He spent his final 20 years on his mining claim near Yreka and was buried in a pauper's grave.
- Eric Pianka, biologist, grew up in Yreka and experienced injuries related to a unfired bazooka round.
- Elijah Steele, an early Northern California pioneer, state legislator, and Indian agent who tried to prevent the Modoc War, lived in Yreka when he was Superior Court Judge for Siskiyou County from 1879 to 1883.

== Palindromes ==
"Yreka Bakery" is a palindrome. The loss of the "B" in a bakery sign read from the reverse is mentioned as a possible source of the name Yreka in Mark Twain's autobiography. The original Yreka Bakery was founded in 1856 by baker Frederick Deng. The palindrome was recognized early on: "spell Yreka Bakery backwards and you will know where to get a good loaf of bread" is quoted as an ad in the May 23, 1863, Yreka Semi-Weekly Journal and states that 12 loaves cost $1 (~$26.00 in 2025). The Yreka Bakery moved eventually to its longtime location, 322 West Miner Street, where it remained under several ownerships until it closed in 1965 on retirement of the baker "Martin", and clerk Alta Hudson. Another Yreka Bakery opened in a different location in 1974, but is no longer in business. Author Martin Gardner mentioned that Yreka Bakery was in business on West Miner Street in Yreka, but it was pointed out by readers "the Yreka Bakery no longer existed. In 1970 the original premises were occupied by the art store Yrella Gallery, also a palindrome". The historic Brown-Nickell-Authenrieth Building, 322–324 West Miner Street, houses a restaurant.

== See also ==
- Yreka Western Railroad
