= Jefferson Public Radio =

Radio network in California and Oregon, United States

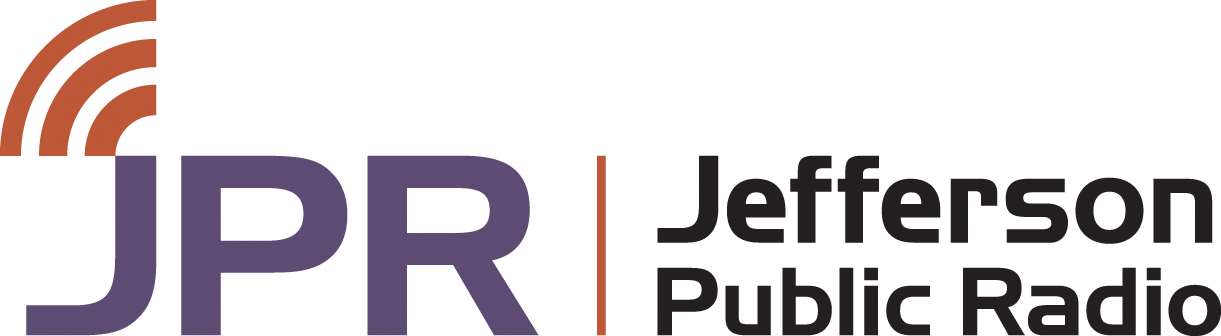
- Type: Public Radio Network
- Country: United States
- Broadcast area: Oregon; California

Programming
- Affiliations: National Public Radio; Public Radio Exchange; American Public Media

Ownership
- Owner: Southern Oregon University

History
- Launch date: 1969

Links
- Website: www.ijpr.org

Jefferson Public Radio (JPR) is a regional public radio broadcasting network serving over a million potential listeners in Southern Oregon and the Shasta Cascade region of northern California. Owned by Southern Oregon University, the network is headquartered in the JPR Broadcast Center at the Oregon Center for the Arts complex on the SOU campus at 470 South Mountain Avenue in southeast Ashland, near Medford. It is named after the proposed State of Jefferson, an area which roughly corresponds to its vast and mostly mountainous coverage area of 60,000 square miles (160,000 km^{2}).

JPR's flagship station, KSOR in Ashland, signed on in April 1969 as a 10-watt station operated by students at what was then Southern Oregon College. It began moving away from its college radio roots during the 1970s, becoming a full NPR member by the end of the decade. In the early 1980s, it began building a massive system of translators covering large portions of Oregon and California, and now claims one of the largest translator network of any public radio station in the country.

At first, KSOR was not familiar with the history of Jefferson. However, by the time KSOR began to build full-power satellites later in the decade, it realized that its service area was virtually coextensive with the State of Jefferson. It rebranded itself as "Jefferson Public Radio" in 1989, feeling that name was more than appropriate for its growing network and the area it served.

== Programming ==
The network broadcasts local programming as well as programs from National Public Radio, Public Radio Exchange, American Public Media, and the BBC World Service among other sources.

Its programming is organized into three broadcasting services. Most listeners in the JPR service area can choose between all three services, giving them a programming choice comparable to those in far larger markets.

=== Classics & News ===
"Classics & News" was KSOR/JPR's original radio service and can be heard throughout the JPR broadcast area. The service has the most translators and the most powerful signals. On weekdays the service plays NPR's news programs Morning Edition, and All Things Considered, and local classical music programming during the midday. In the evenings, the service runs WFMT's Beethoven Network hosted by Peter van de Graff, branded as State Farm Music Hall. For many years, it signed off from 2-5 a.m., but now airs 24 hours a day.

11 FM stations and 28 translators make up JPR's "Classics & News Service". Outside the JPR area, C & N broadcasts in Mendocino on a translator.

Call sign	Frequency	City of license	State	Class	ERP (W)	Height (m (ft))	FCC info
KHEC	91.1 FM	Crescent City	California	A	125	54 m (177 ft)	FCC (KHEC)
KLDD	91.9 FM	McCloud	California	C3	1,100	447 m (1,467 ft)	FCC (KLDD)
KWCA	101.1 FM	Palo Cedro	California	C2	4,900	450 m (1,480 ft)	FCC (KWCA)
KNHT	102.5 FM	Rio Dell	California	C1	4,500	509 m (1,670 ft)	FCC (KNHT)
KNYR	91.3 FM	Yreka	California	C2	400	721 m (2,365 ft)	FCC (KNYR)
KSOR	90.1 FM	Ashland	Oregon	C	38,000	810 m (2,660 ft)	FCC (KSOR)
KSRG	88.3 FM	Ashland	Oregon	A	230	410 m (1,350 ft)	FCC (KSRG)
KZBY	90.5 FM	Coos Bay	Oregon	A	880	150 m (490 ft)	FCC (KZBY)
KLMF	88.5 FM	Klamath Falls	Oregon	A	95	659 m (2,162 ft)	FCC (KLMF)
KOOZ	94.1 FM	Myrtle Point	Oregon	C1	9,000	451 m (1,480 ft)	FCC (KOOZ)
KSRS	91.5 FM	Roseburg	Oregon	A	2,000	93 m (305 ft)	FCC (KSRS)

=== Rhythm & News ===
"Rhythm & News" is JPR's second oldest service, designed to complement C&N while running Morning Edition and All Things Considered for a longer period. During the middle of the day, local hosts program a show called "Open Air" that features a unique blend of indie rock/pop, AAA, and Americana music. The evening features adult album alternative programming from World Cafe and "UnderCurrents". Like "Classics & News", "Rhythm & News" also signed off the air from 2-5 a.m. for many years before adopting a 24-hour schedule.

There are five FM stations and six translators broadcasting the "Rhythm & News" service.

Call sign	Frequency	City of license	State	Class	ERP (W)	Height (m (ft))	FCC info
KNCA	89.7 FM	Burney	California	C0	30,000	629 m (2,064 ft)	FCC (KNCA)
KNSQ	88.1 FM	Mount Shasta	California	C2	1,200	475.6 m (1,560 ft)	FCC (KNSQ)
KSMF	89.1 FM	Ashland	Oregon	C2	2,300	412 m (1,352 ft)	FCC (KSMF)
KSBA	88.5 FM	Coos Bay	Oregon	C3	2,700	184 m (604 ft)	FCC (KSBA)
KSKF	90.9 FM	Klamath Falls	Oregon	C1	6,500 horizontal 2,000 vertical	687 m (2,254 ft)	FCC (KSKF)

=== News & Information ===
"News & Information" is JPR's extended news service offering JPR's only local talk show, The Jefferson Exchange, as well as the NPR talk shows 1A, Here & Now and Fresh Air. It airs the BBC World Service overnights.

Eight AM stations and three FM stations carry the "News & Information Service".

Call sign	Frequency	City of license	State	Power (W)	ERP (W)
KNHM	91.5 FM	Eureka	California	—	500
KPMO	1300 AM	Mendocino	California	5,000 day 77 night	—
KMJC	620 AM	Mount Shasta	California	1,000 day 29 night	—
KUEK	560 AM	Orland	California	3,000 day 53 night	—
KJPR	1330 AM	Shasta Lake City	California	1,000	—
KHWA	102.3 FM	Weed	California	—	15,500
KSYC-FM	103.9 FM	Yreka	California	—	10,000
KRVM	1280 AM	Eugene	Oregon	5,000 day 1,500 night	—
KAGI	930 AM	Grants Pass	Oregon	5,000 day 123 night	—
KTBR	950 AM	Roseburg	Oregon	3,400 day 20 night	—
KSJK	1230 AM	Talent	Oregon	1,000	—

== Expansion & Funding ==
In 2004, as a response to a perceived lack of public radio programming in other cities, Jefferson Public Radio began expanding its service outside of the traditional State of Jefferson. Stations in Eugene and Mendocino were purchased for the news and information format, and the news and information station in Eureka was purchased by JPR from an owner who had programmed it with the BBC World Service 24 hours a day. The purchase of the station in Eureka was particularly controversial as it was thought that it would compete directly with Humboldt State University's KHSU.

In 2026, Southern Oregon University began to implement major budget cuts in response to a $12 million deficit. Part of that plan included JPR moving to a self-sustaining model. This happened shortly after JPR, like other public radio stations, lost all federal funding. The final plan adopted by the university outlined how the relationship would change. New employees would be hired under the JPR Foundation instead of the university, and the university will fund a small portion of JPR's executive director's salary to support legal obligations by the FCC. The university will continue to hold onto the FCC licenses and JPR continues to operate from the university campus. Based on the university projection, JPR will be 99.3% self-supported by the 2027 fiscal year.

== See also ==
- List of radio stations in Oregon
- List of radio stations in California
- Oregon Public Broadcasting
- Southern Oregon Public Television
- Jefferson (Pacific state)
