= KKLC =

- Fall River Mills, California; United States
- Broadcast area: Redding; Red Bluff
- Frequency: 107.9 MHz

Programming
- Format: Contemporary Christian
- Network: K-Love

Ownership
- Owner: Educational Media Foundation

History
- First air date: November 26, 1977
- Former call signs: KEDY (1977–1995); KMJC-FM (1995–2006)
- Former frequencies: 95.3 MHz (1977–1995)

Technical information
- Licensing authority: FCC
- Facility ID: 60022
- Class: C1
- ERP: 13,000 watts
- HAAT: 650 meters (2,130 ft)
- Transmitter coordinates: 40°54′23″N 121°49′39″W
- Translator: See § Translators

Links
- Public license information: Public file; LMS
- Webcast: Listen live
- Website: klove.com

KKLC (107.9 FM) is a radio station broadcasting a Contemporary Christian format. Licensed to Fall River Mills, California, United States, the station is currently owned by Educational Media Foundation.

== History ==
The station signed on the air in November 1977 as KEDY 95.3 in Mount Shasta, California, owned and operated by the Shasta Cascade Broadcasting Corporation, run by David Rees Sr. It came on the heels of the success of its sister station KWSD/620. The station was taken over by David's son, David Rees Jr. in the 1980s and had played various formats from adult standards to rock and was home to many great radio talents such as Fred "The Big Guy" Gerding Jr., Timothy "T. Martin" Harris and Rick Martin (former owner/talent of what is now KHWA). David Jr's sons and daughter, Dennis, Chris, and Tricia also served as on-air talent.

The frequency was moved up to 107.9 FM as the station was sold to Dalmatian Enterprises, Inc., owners of KSYC-AM-FM. KEDY was then sold to Siskiyou Radio Partners, Inc. in 1995 (owned by Tom Huth and Bob Darling), then had the call letters changed to KMJC-FM (MJC stood for "Magic") and the format was changed to oldies as the station was branded "Magic 108".

KMJC-FM was then sold to Four Rivers Broadcasting in 2001, which also purchased sister stations KMJC, KSYC, and KSYC-FM. The station was then branded "The Mountain" and played eclectic (or adult album alternative) music. Then, finally the station was picked up by Educational Media Foundation, which operates K-LOVE Radio, in 2004 as Four Rivers also sold its AM stations to Jefferson Public Radio of Ashland, Oregon.

In 2006, the station's call letters were again changed to the current KKLC and the station's service area has since moved to the Redding, California market. The Siskiyou County K-LOVE service area is now served by translators K240EJ licensed to Yreka and K253AX licensed to Shasta and serving Mount Shasta.

== Translators ==
KKLC broadcasts on the following translators:

Call sign	Frequency	City of license	FID	ERP (W)	Class	FCC info
K221EV	95.5 FM	Hayfork, California	138679	250	D	LMS
K270AA	101.9 FM	Redding, California	18802	90	D	LMS
K253AX	98.5 FM	Shasta, California	138912	139	D	LMS
K240EJ	95.9 FM	Yreka, CA	155431	10	D	LMS
