= Southern Oregon University =

Public university in Ashland, Oregon, US

Coordinates: 42°11′10″N 122°41′38″W

- Former name: List: Ashland Academy (1872–1878); Ashland Academy and Commercial College (1878–1882); Ashland College and Normal School (1882–1886); Ashland State Normal School (1886–1895); Southern Oregon State Normal School (1895–1909; 1925–1932); Southern Oregon Normal School (1932–1939); Southern Oregon College of Education (1939–1956) Southern Oregon College (1956–1975); Southern Oregon State College (1975–1997)
- Type: Public university
- Established: 1872; 154 years ago
- Accreditation: NWCCU
- Academic affiliations: HECC; Space-grant
- Endowment: $38 million (2021)
- President: Rick Bailey
- Provost: Casey R. Shillam
- Faculty: 320
- Administrative staff: 474
- Students: 5,113 (fall 2024)
- Undergraduates: 4,235 (fall 2024)
- Postgraduates: 878 (fall 2024)
- Location: Ashland, Oregon, United States
- Campus: 175 acres (71 ha); Midsize suburb
- Newspaper: The Siskiyou
- Colors: Red and black
- Nickname: Raiders
- Sporting affiliations: NAIA — Cascade; Frontier
- Mascot: Red-tailed hawk
- Website: sou.edu
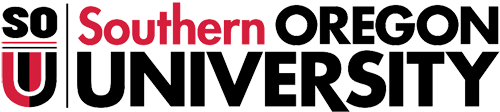

Southern Oregon University (SOU) is a public university in Ashland, Oregon, United States. It was founded in 1872 as the Ashland Academy, has been in its current location since 1926, and was known by nine other names before assuming its current name in 1997. Its Ashland campus, located 14 miles (23 km) from Oregon's border with California, encompasses 175 acres (71 ha). Five of SOU's newest facilities have achieved LEED certification from the U.S. Green Building Council. SOU is headquarters for Jefferson Public Radio and public access station Rogue Valley Community Television. The university has been governed since 2015 by the SOU Board of Trustees.

Southern Oregon University is organized into four schools and colleges: Business, Education, Arts & Humanities, and Natural & Social Sciences. About 60 bachelor's degree, graduate, and certificate programs are offered. Most of SOU's academic programs are on the 10-week quarter system. The university's Oregon Center for the Arts enjoys a collaborative relationship with the Oregon Shakespeare Festival, located in downtown Ashland.

== History ==
Southern Oregon University began as "Ashland Academy" in 1872, founded by Ashland's Methodist Episcopal Church. The Rev. Joseph Henry Skidmore served as its first president. In 1878, the school was renamed the "Ashland Academy and Commercial College", and then renamed "Ashland College and Normal School" in 1882, "Ashland State Normal School" in 1886 and "Southern Oregon State Normal School" in 1895. While Oregon lawmakers designated the institution in 1882 as an official state normal school — a teachers’ college — the state provided no funding. It closed in 1890 and reopened five years later, still relying on tuition and donations for revenue. The Oregon legislature finally recognized the institution's needs in 1897 and approved a first-time appropriation of $7,500. The school flourished, but the legislature reversed course in 1909 and eliminated funding for Oregon's normal schools.

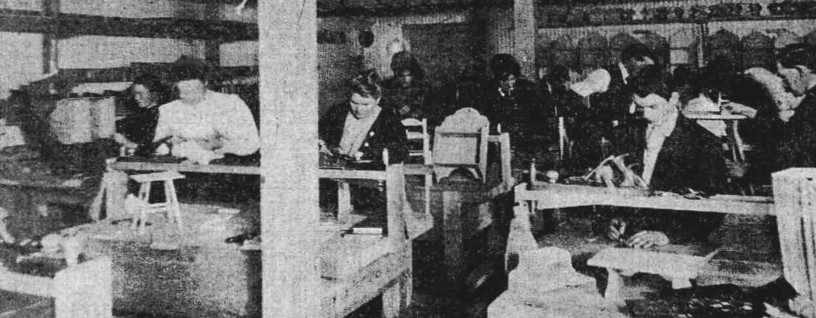
Students in the manual training program at Ashland Normal School in 1908

"Southern Oregon State Normal School" closed at the end of the school year and remained shuttered until state funding was reestablished in 1925. The state restarted Southern Oregon State Normal School in Ashland on 24 acres (9.7 ha) at its current location in 1926. The first building on the new campus was Churchill Hall, named for the college's president, Julius A. Churchill. Ashland residents passed the "Normal School Site Bonds" to purchase the campus property and the legislature approved $175,000 to build the new facility, which now serves as SOU's administrative building. Inlow Hall at Eastern Oregon University was built from a copy of the building plans for Churchill Hall, designed by architect John Bennes in the Renaissance style. In 1932, the Oregon State Board of Higher Education renamed the institute Southern Oregon Normal School (SONS).

The school's speech and drama professor, Angus Bowmer, staged a Fourth of July production of Shakespeare's "Merchant of Venice" in 1935, launching what would become the Oregon Shakespeare Festival.

The college received full accreditation from the American Association of Teachers Colleges in 1939, and Oregon Governor Charles A. Sprague signed a bill changing the institution's name to Southern Oregon College of Education (SOCE).

Elmo N. Stevenson, for whom the Stevenson Union was later named, took over as president in 1946, and rebuilt the school's enrollment from a low of 45 at the close of World War II to nearly 800 less than three years after his arrival. He became the institution's longest-serving president to date, retiring in 1969 from what had been renamed Southern Oregon College (SOC) in 1956, reflecting more diverse course offerings.

The institution was renamed Southern Oregon State College (SOSC) in 1975 and became "Southern Oregon University" in 1997. The campus now includes 175 acres (71 ha) with modern facilities, enrollment of more than 6,000 students and more than 1,100 degrees conferred annually.

== Academics ==
Southern Oregon University consists of four schools and colleges: Business, Education, Arts & Humanities, and Natural & Social Sciences. The Oregon Health & Science University also maintains a school of nursing program at the SOU main campus.

Southern Oregon University is the first university in the United States to offer a Transgender Studies Certificate.

Computing Science Building (2026)

Britt Hall (2026)

Marion Ady Building (2026)

== Rogue Community College and Southern Oregon University Higher Education Center ==
Southern Oregon University and Rogue Community College worked together to implement the guidelines of the white paper "Annexation of Jackson County to the District of Rogue Community College," signed on March 6, 1996. During the 1997–99 biennium, Rogue Community College and Southern Oregon University received regional partnership funding from the legislature to jointly launch several new initiatives to provide additional access for a larger number of residents in southern Oregon. Construction on the downtown Medford center broke ground March 2007 and was completed September 2008. The three-story, 68,700-square-foot (6,380 m^{2}) center includes classrooms, science labs, computer labs, a Prometric Testing Center and the Business Center. The Higher Education Center offers lower- and upper-division level courses, as well as three master's degree programs: Master in Business Administration (offered in a cohort format with classes held on Saturdays), Master in Management (courses offered online and at night), and the Master of Arts in Teaching (a two-year, part-time version of the Southern Oregon University one-year Master of Arts in Teaching program).

The presidents of SOU, RCC, Oregon Institute of Technology and Klamath Community College jointly announced in November 2018 their creation of the Southern Oregon Higher Education Consortium. The alliance is intended to streamline students’ educational pathways and address the region's specific workforce needs. Separate meetings of academic officers and enrollment leaders from the four institutions are held regularly to discuss complementary academic programs, transfer agreements and other issues of mutual interest.

== Hannon Library ==
The library was named after Oregon state senator Lenn Hannon after he secured $20 million in government bonds and $3.5 million in private support. The Hannon Library finished construction in 2005. The Oregon State Board of Higher Education initially named the library The Lenn and Dixie Hannon Library, but the facility's name was later changed to The Hannon Library. The project almost doubled the size of the existing library and created much-needed room to expand publications and collections. The library also received many technological advancements that provide long-term value for the community.

== Publications ==
The Siskiyou, a student-edited university paper staffed by student reporters and photographers, is published online periodically during the academic year. The print edition of The Siskiyou began in 1926, and its editorial staff pioneered the shift to an entirely online student newspaper in January 2012. The Siskiyou received top honors in the Oregon Newspaper Publishers Association's Collegiate Newspaper Contest in 2009 and 2018.

SOU News, an online "news portal" managed by the university's Marketing and Communications office, launched in September 2018. It publishes several staff-written stories each week about SOU news and events, and provides daily links to stories about SOU from external media.

== Student life ==
Undergraduate demographics as of fall 2023
Race and ethnicity	Total
White	55%
Hispanic	14%
Unknown	13%
Two or more races	10%
Asian	2%
Black	2%
Native Hawaiian/Pacific Islander	2%
American Indian/Alaska Native	1%
International student	1%
Economic diversity
Low-income (Note: The percentage of students who received an income-based federal Pell Grant intended for low-income students.)	39%
Affluent (Note: The percentage of students who are a part of the American middle class at the bare minimum.)	61%

Many of the majors offered at the university have associated clubs. There are clubs for hobbies, sports, and music, and for support for multiculturalism. Southern Oregon University students are involved in community arts. Outside magazine rated Southern Oregon University one of the top 20 schools in the U.S. where students can hit the books and the backcountry.

The Princeton Review named SOU one of the most environmentally responsible colleges in the U.S. and Canada in 2016. SOU became the original Bee Campus USA in 2015 and in 2018 it was named the nation's top pollinator-friendly college by the Sierra Club, as part of its annual "Cool Schools" rankings. The university was recognized by the American Association of State Colleges and Universities as the 2019 recipient of AASCU's Excellence and Innovation Award for comprehensive sustainability and sustainable development.

Student activities and support are supplemented by a number of resource centers on campus. The Women's Resource Center, Student Sustainability Center, Commuter Resource Center, and Queer Resource Center all provide services, resources, and events for their respective communities. The university is represented on the board of directors of the Oregon Student Association, and SOU's 15-member board of trustees includes one student member.

There are several residence halls on campus, as well as family housing complexes.

- The newest residence hall complex on campus is Raider Village, which includes Shasta and McLoughlin Halls and The Hawk dining commons. The state-of-the-art facility, which was completed in 2013, achieved LEED Gold certification for sustainability.
- The adjacent Greensprings Complex consists of four halls: Applegate, Bear Creek, Crater Lake and Deschutes. The four halls, built in the 1970s, are centered around a large lounge. Greensprings residents share The Hawk dining commons with residents from Shasta and McLoughlin halls.
- Madrone Hall consists of 24 four-bedroom suites, each with two bathrooms, a common kitchen and furnished living room. The Madrone Apartments opened in September 2005.
- Student Apartments and Family Housing is located two blocks from campus and houses more than 200 students, faculty, staff, and their families. Units in the Quincy Apartments and Wightman Apartments range from 450-square-foot studios to 1,518-square-foot, four-bedroom units. The university also has houses that are available to qualified students.
- The oldest residence hall on campus that is still in regular use is Madrone Hall.
- Susanne Homes (Suzy) is now home to the Honors College, Community of Recovery in Education (CORE) program and SOU's McNair Scholars Program. The main area of the building, called "the Fishbowl," is used by all four groups.
- The Cascade Complex, a cluster of nine residence halls and a cafeteria constructed in the early 1960s has not been occupied since 2013 and was demolished in 2025.

== Athletics ==
The Southern Oregon athletic teams are called the Raiders. The school has the red-tailed hawk as their mascot. The university is a member of the National Association of Intercollegiate Athletics (NAIA), primarily competing in the Cascade Collegiate Conference (CCC) for most of its sports since the 1993–94 academic year, while its football team competes in the Frontier Conference.

Southern Oregon competes in 20 intercollegiate varsity sports. Men's sports include basketball, cross country, football, golf, soccer, track & field, and wrestling. Women's sports include basketball, beach volleyball, cheerleading, cross country, golf, soccer, softball, track & field, volleyball, and wrestling. Past club sports included baseball, crew, judo, lacrosse, rugby, skiing, and ultimate Frisbee.

Southern Oregon's football team won the NAIA Football Championship in 2014, and its wrestling team won the National Wrestling Championship four times: in 1978, 1983, 1994, and 2001. The Raiders men's cross country team won the NAIA men's cross country championship in 2010 and 2016; the men's and women's teams won the NAIA Cross Country Championship Combined Title in 2018; and the women's softball team won the NAIA softball championship in 2019, 2021, 2023 and 2025.

== Notable people ==
- Ted Adams, publisher
- Karl Backus, actor and art director
- Grant Brisbee, sports writer
- Berk Brown, college football player and coach
- Ty Burrell, actor
- D'Arcy Carden, actor
- Devin Cole, college wrestler, wrestling coach, and professional mixed martial artist
- Todd Field, Oscar-nominated filmmaker
- Lenn Hannon, politician and namesake of the Hannon Library
- Mark Helfrich, college and professional football coach
- Juan Carlos Romero Hicks, politician
- Lawson Fusao Inada, poet
- Betty LaDuke, artist
- Virginia Linder, judge
- Jörn Maier, professional gridiron football coach
- Danny Miles, Hall of Fame coach
- Joel Moore, actor
- Fred Mossler, business executive
- Julie Parrish, politician
- Agnes Baker Pilgrim, spiritual elder of the Takelma tribe
- Kim Rhodes, actor
- Aldrick Rosas, professional football player
- Rick Story, college wrestler and professional mixed martial artist
- Andrae Thurman, professional football player
- Mike Whitehead, professional mixed martial artist
- Robin Zasio, clinical psychologist
