= Northern California =

American geographic and cultural region

- Region
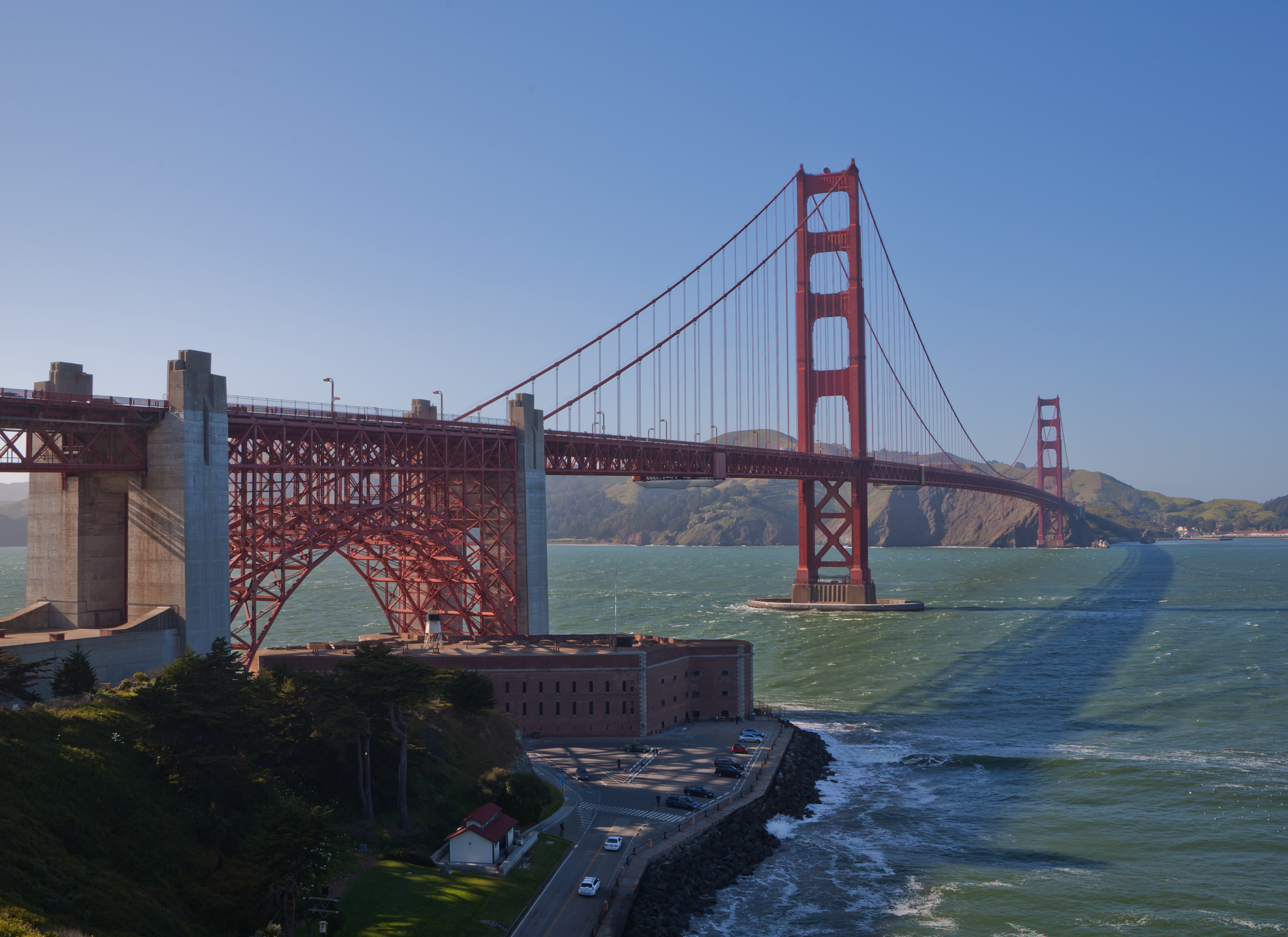
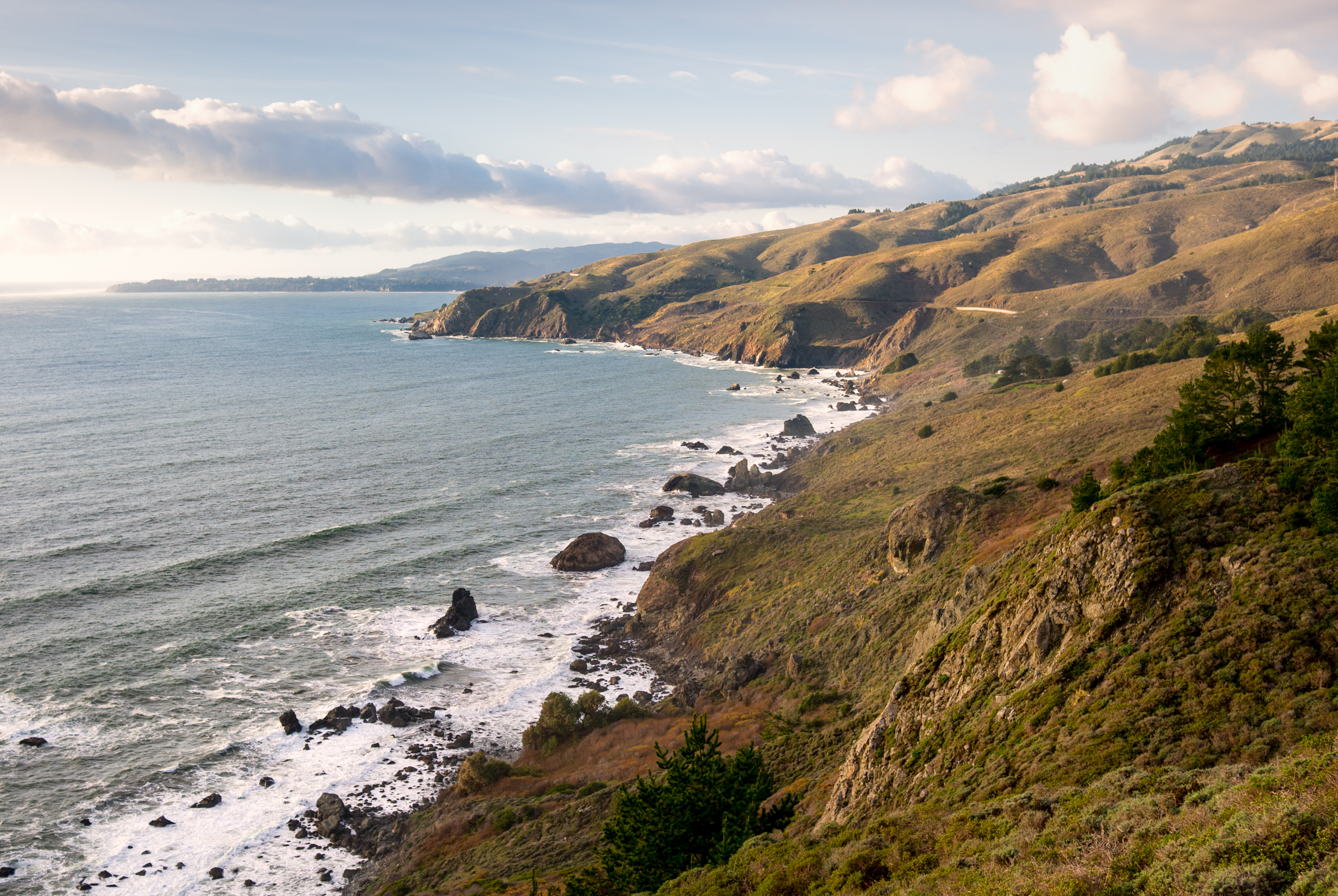
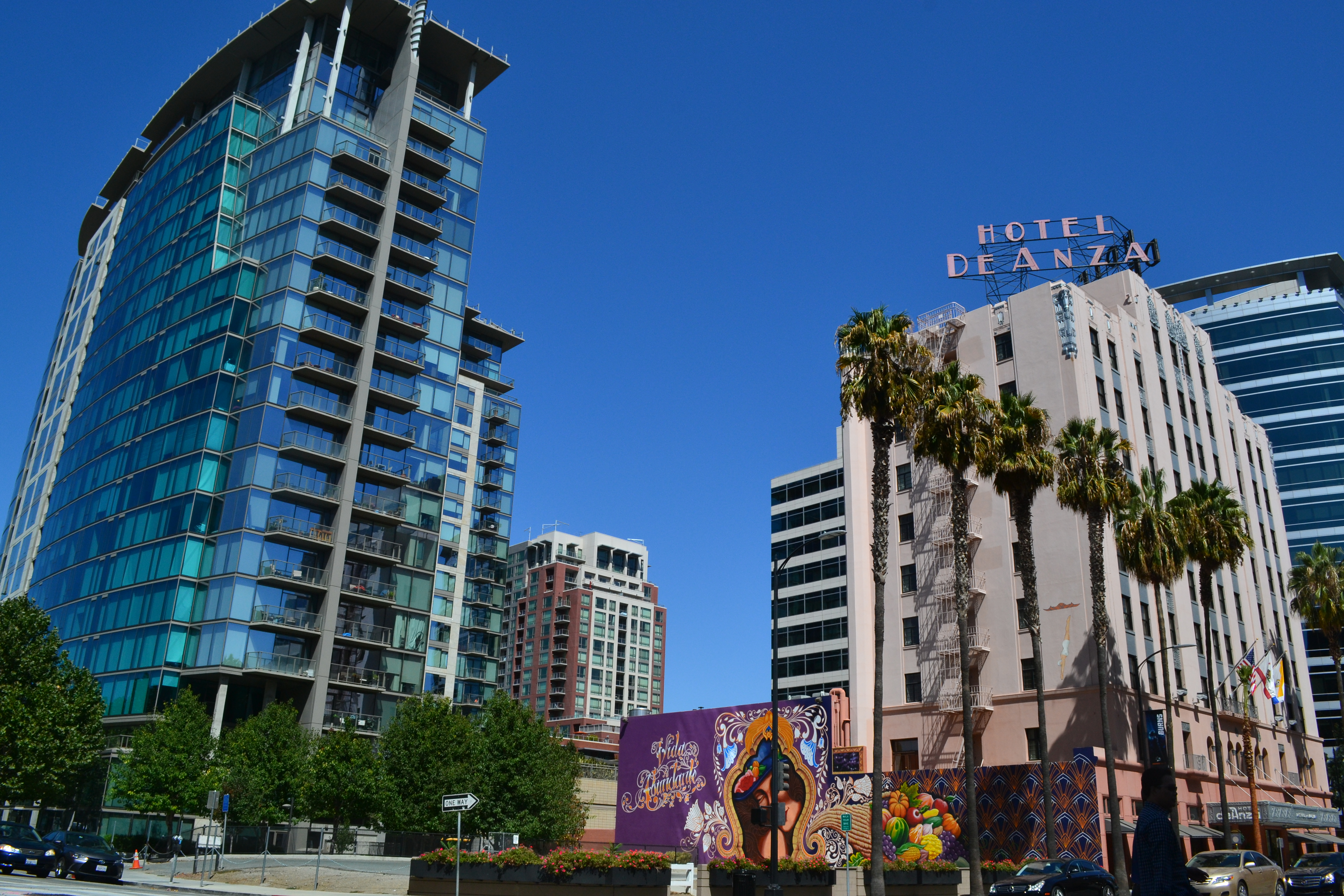
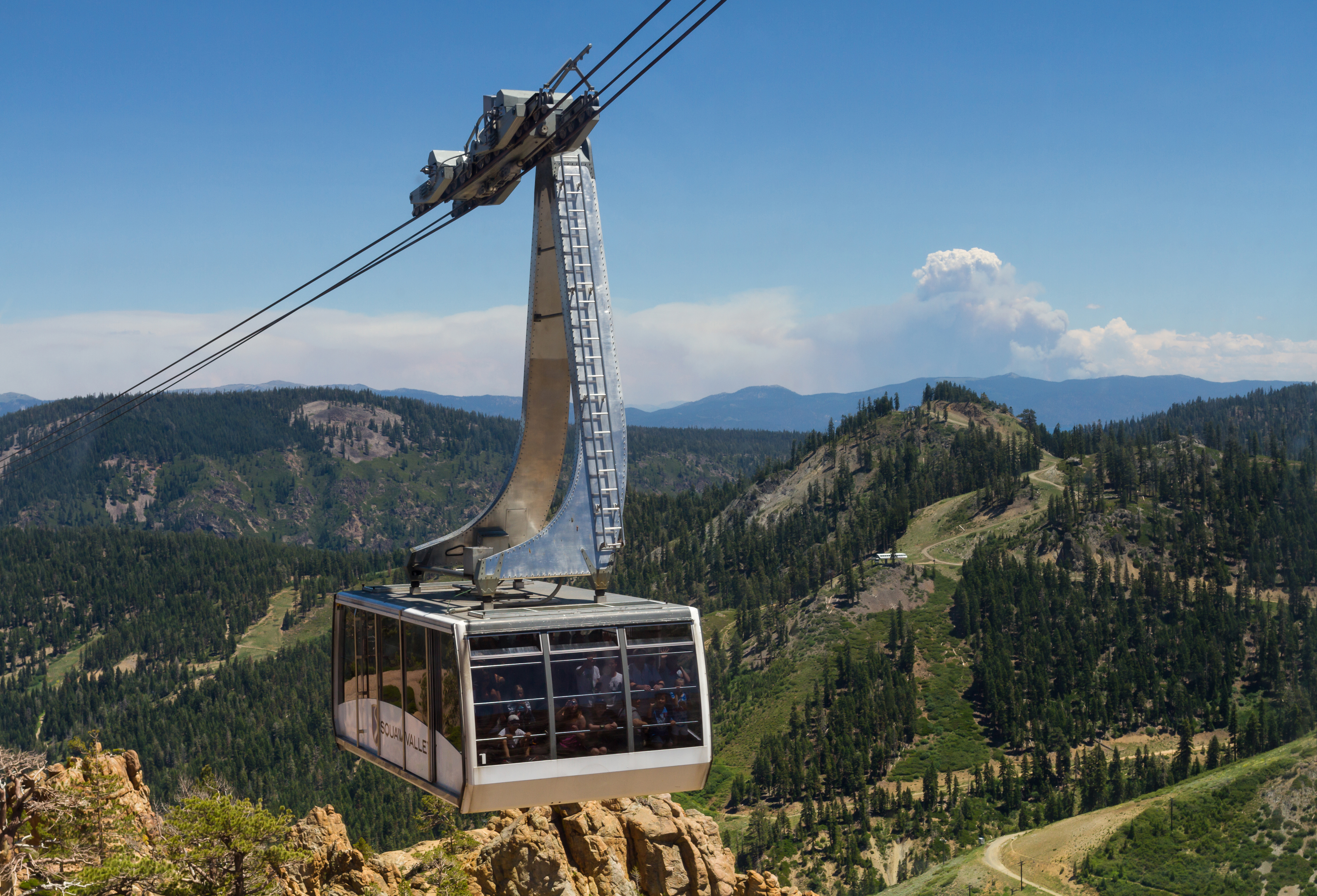
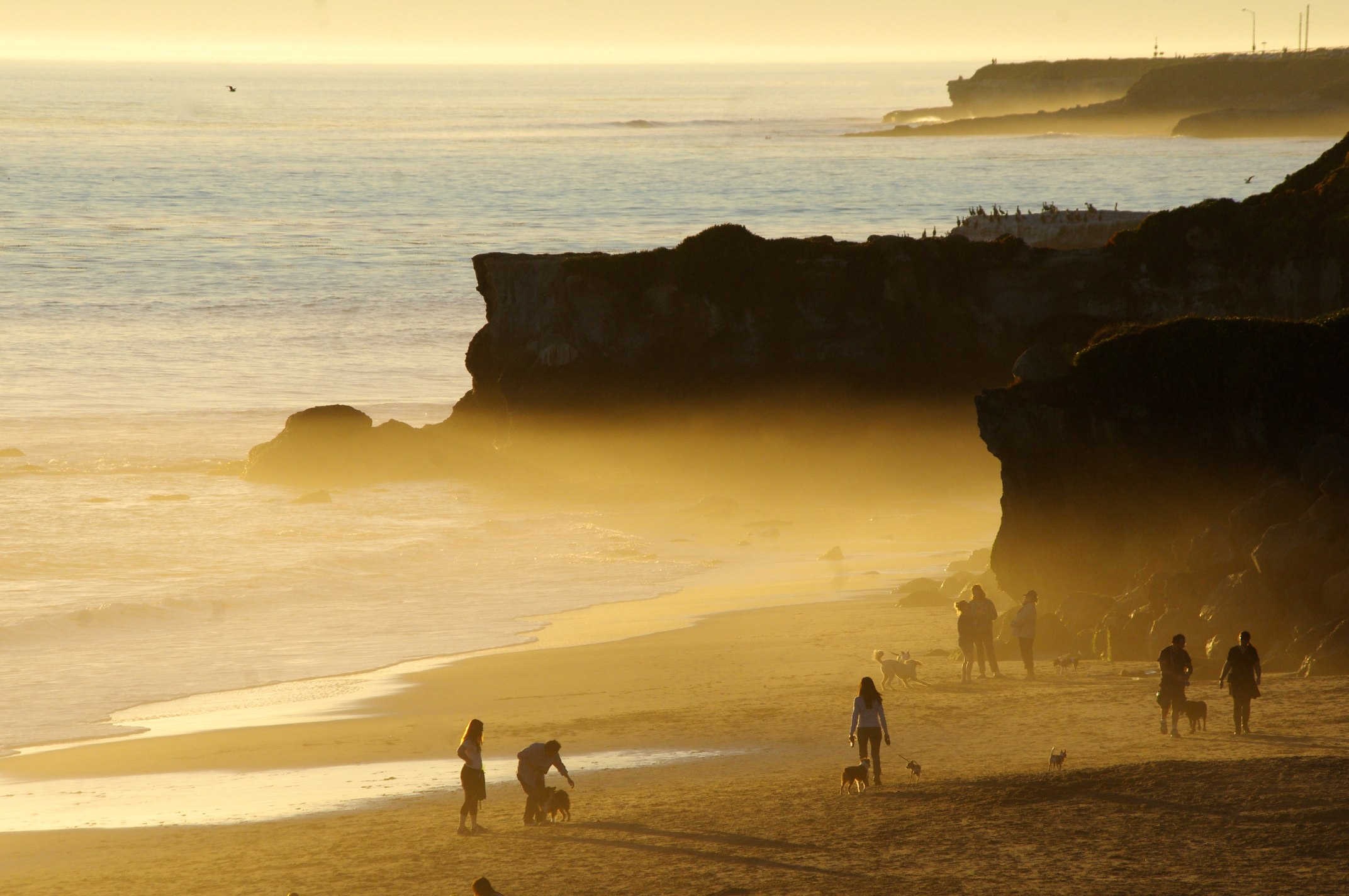
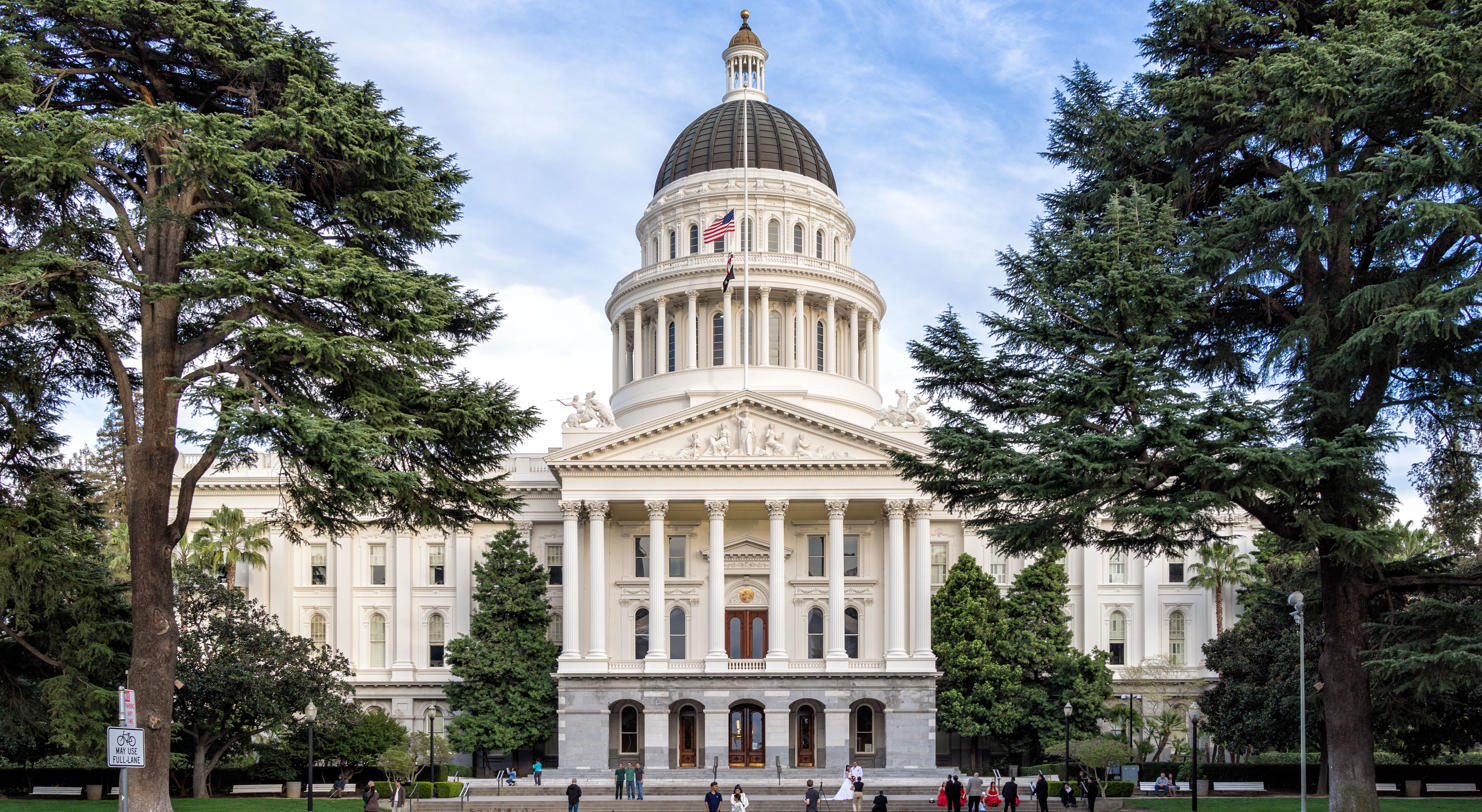
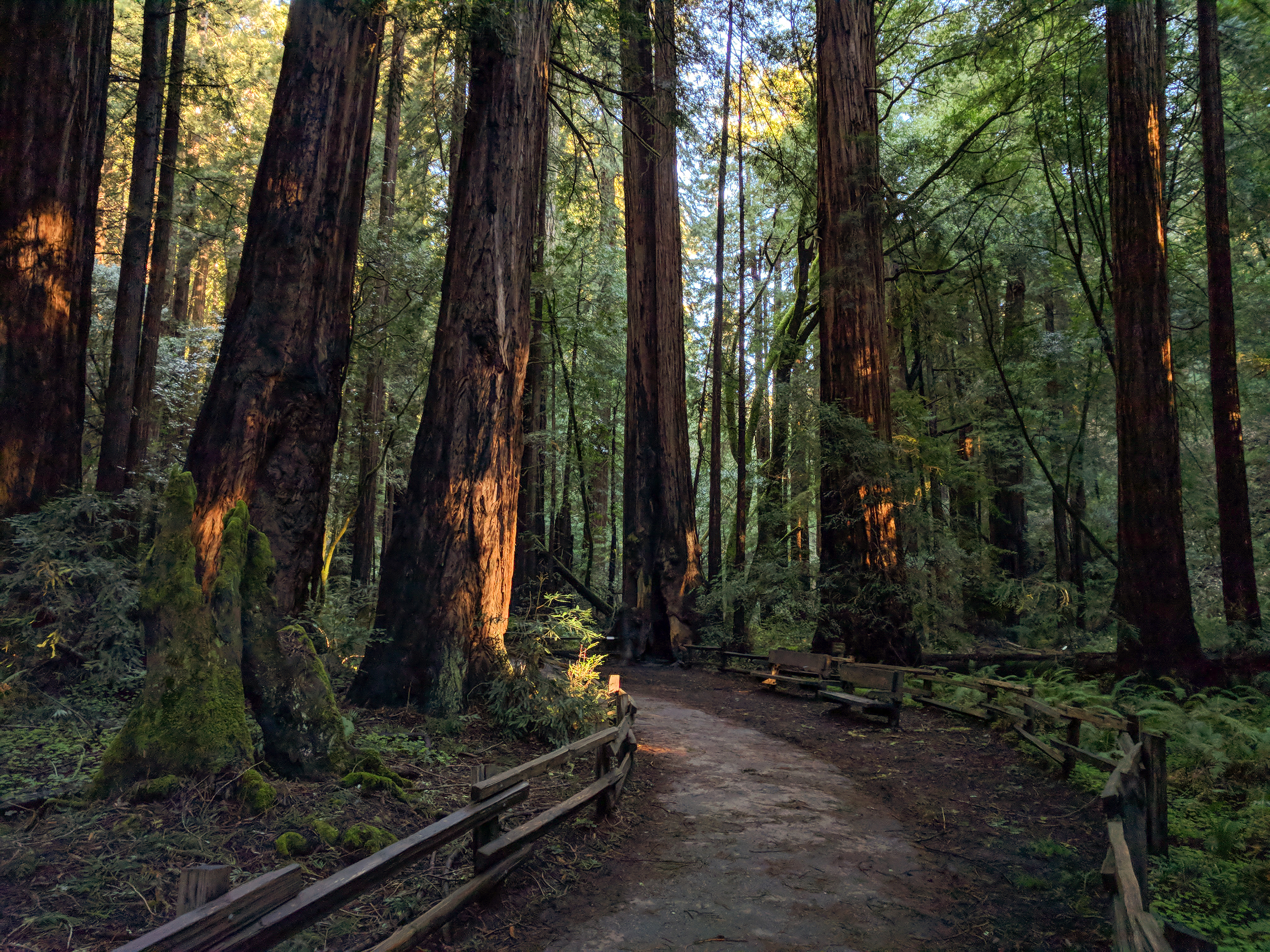
- Golden Gate Bridge Marin County San Jose Lake Tahoe Natural Bridges State Beach San Francisco The California State Capitol in Sacramento Muir Woods National Monument

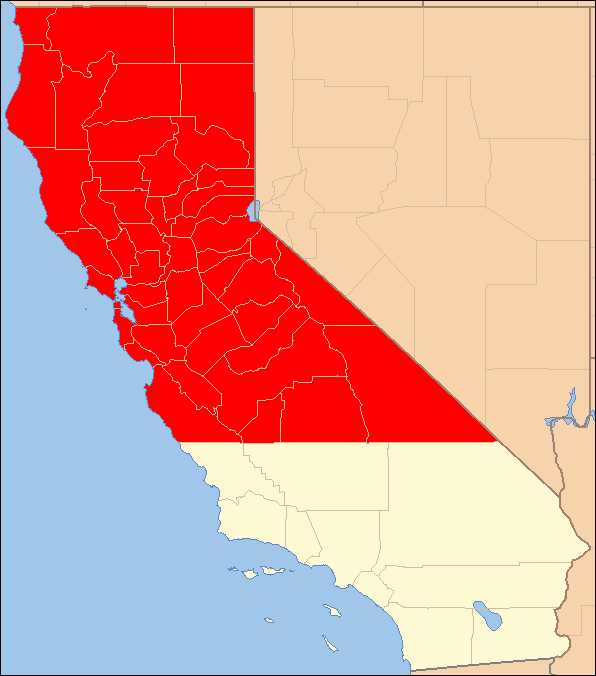
- Northern California counties in red
- Country: United States
- State: California
- Major cities: San Jose; San Francisco; Sacramento; Fresno; Oakland; Stockton; Fremont; Modesto; Roseville; Elk Grove; Santa Rosa; Salinas; Hayward; Sunnyvale; Visalia; Chico; Redding; San Mateo; San Rafael; Eureka; Susanville
- Largest city: San Jose

Area (10-county)
  - Total: 107,191 sq mi (277,620 km^{2})

Population (2020)
  - Total: 15,775,319
- Demonym: Northern Californian

GDP
  - Total: $1.65 trillion (2022)

Northern California (commonly shortened to NorCal) is a geocultural region that comprises the northern portion of the U.S. state of California, spanning the northernmost 48 of the state's 58 counties. One of the 11 megaregions of the United States, Northern California in its largest definition is determined by dividing the state into two parts, the other being Southern California. The region's main population centers include the San Francisco Bay Area, Greater Sacramento, Metropolitan Fresno, and the Monterey Bay Area.

Northern California is coterminous with the natural range of the coast redwood and the giant sequoia, with many well-known old-growth forests and smaller groves. It contains most of the Sierra Nevada, including Yosemite Valley and part of Lake Tahoe, Mount Shasta (the second-highest peak in the Cascade Range after Mount Rainier in Washington), and most of the Central Valley, one of the world's most productive agricultural regions. Northern California is also home to Silicon Valley, the global headquarters for several of the largest and most powerful companies in the world, including Alphabet Inc. (Google), Apple, Meta, and Nvidia.

Evidence of Native American habitation in the area dates from at least 19,000 years ago and successive waves of arrivals led to one of the most densely populated areas of pre-Columbian North America. The arrival of European explorers from the early 16th to the mid-18th centuries did not establish European settlements in northern California. In 1770, the Spanish mission at Monterey was the first European settlement in the area, followed by other missions along the coast—eventually extending as far north as Sonoma County.

== Description ==
=== North–south divisions of California ===
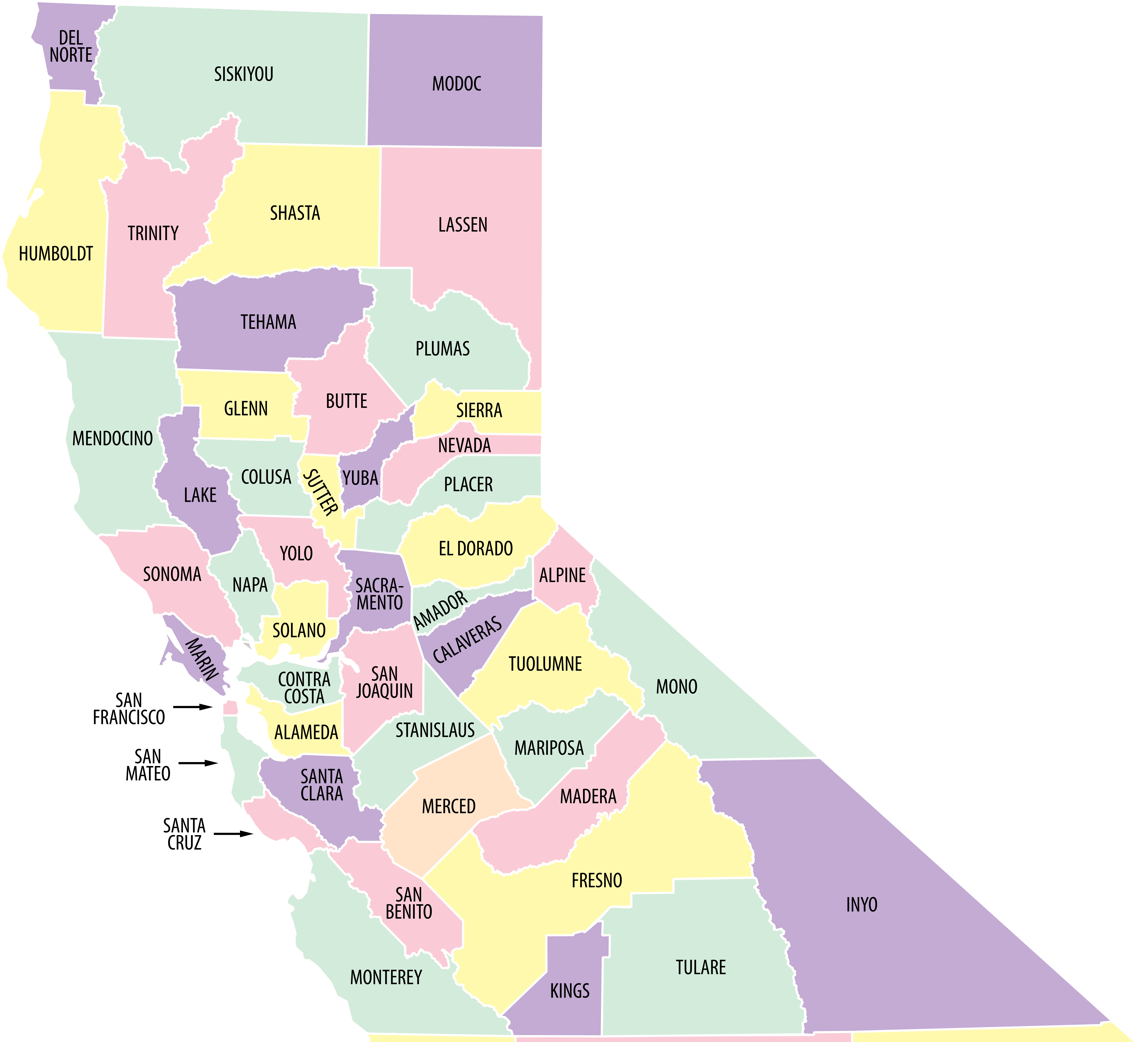
Map of northern California counties

California experienced a population boom during its gold rush (1848–1855), bringing more than 300,000 new residents, with very few of these settling in the southern part of the state. The northern two-thirds of the state was seen as the main part, and was often referred to as simply "California", while the southern third was called "Southern California". At that time, the state was profoundly divided by the Tehachapi Mountains which were a barrier to travelers before highways were built, and remain a bioregion barrier. This geographical barrier curves from Point Conception at the Pacific Ocean eastward through the Transverse Ranges including Mount Pinos and Tejon Pass, continuing through the Tehachapi Mountains including Tehachapi Pass, then cutting northward through the southern Sierra Nevada mountain range to Mount Patterson and the Nevada border. The Mojave Desert and the Great Basin Desert are separated from Northern California by mountain ranges in this definition of bioregions. Southern California in the 1850s was a backwater of mainly Spanish-speaking Californios who resented paying state taxes without receiving state projects.

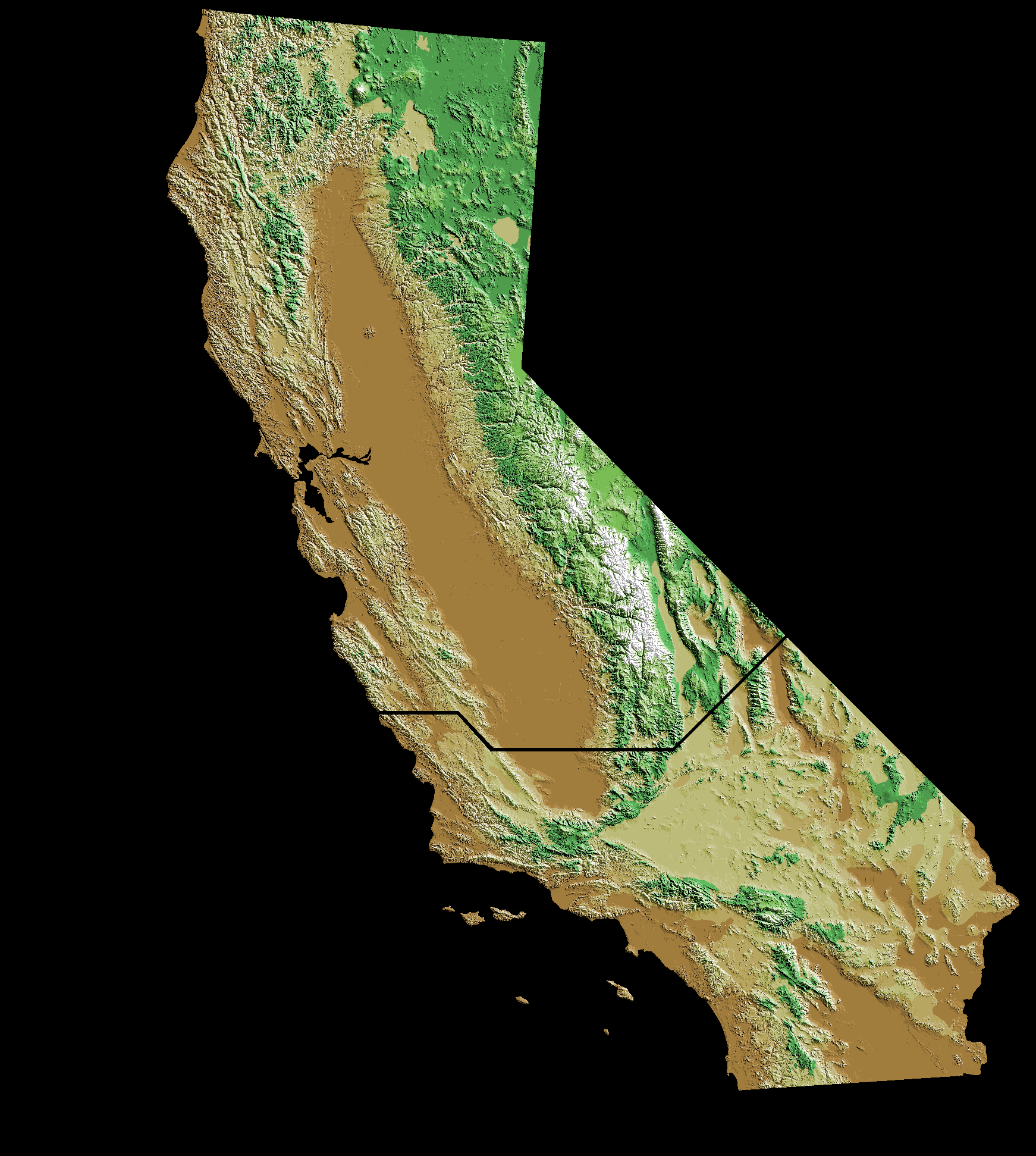
The Pico Act of 1859 proposed to divide California to create the Territory of Colorado in the south, with the northern area retaining the name of California.

In 1859, as proposed by the Californio politician Andrés Pico, the California State Legislature passed the Pico Act aiming to divide the state and create a new territory in the south. The border started in the west at a latitude of six standard parallels south of Mount Diablo—meaning 144 miles south of Mount Diablo at the latitude of 35°45'N, currently the border between Monterey and San Luis Obispo counties. The proposed border bent southward to capture more of the Central Valley, then it angled northeast from Old Tejon Ranch to the California border. The new southern portion was to be called the Territory of Colorado because much of its eastern border was the Colorado River. This legislation was signed by Governor John B. Weller and sent to the United States Congress for ratification, but it never came to a vote. Congress was too divided with tensions which would soon break out into the American Civil War, and despite the efforts of Senator Milton Latham, the bill died. However, an east-west line starting at the southern end of Monterey County grew to define one of the views of north–south division of the state.

"Northern California" may refer to the state's northernmost 48 counties, dividing the state at 35°45'N, or it may refer to the portion north of the geographic barrier formed by the Transverse Ranges, the Tehachapi Mountains, and the Southern Sierras. Because of California's large size and diverse geography, the state can be subdivided in other ways as well. For example, the Central Valley is a region that is distinct both culturally and topographically from coastal California, though in northern versus southern California divisions, the Sacramento Valley and most of the San Joaquin Valley are usually placed in northern California. Some observers describe three partitions of California, with north and south sections separated by Central California.

Technically, California's exact north–south midway division is around 37°N, near the latitude of Morgan Hill and Chowchilla. The geographic center of California is at 37°09′58″N 119°26′58″W near North Fork, northeast of Fresno.

The state is often considered as having an additional division north of the urban areas of the San Francisco Bay Area and Sacramento metropolitan areas. Extreme northern residents have felt under-represented in state government and, in 1941, attempted to form a new state with southwestern Oregon to be called Jefferson, or more recently to introduce legislation to split California into two or three states.

=== Popular usage ===
The coastal area north of the Bay Area is often referred to as the North Coast, touching the counties of Mendocino, Lake, Humboldt, and Del Norte. The interior region north of Sacramento metropolitan area is referred to by locals as the Northstate, consisting of about 20 counties.

"Northern California" was used by Tim Draper as the name of the northernmost state to be created by splitting California into three new states. The bill, Cal 3, was prevented from appearing on the 2018 California ballot because of a constitutional review by the Supreme Court of California.

== Significance ==
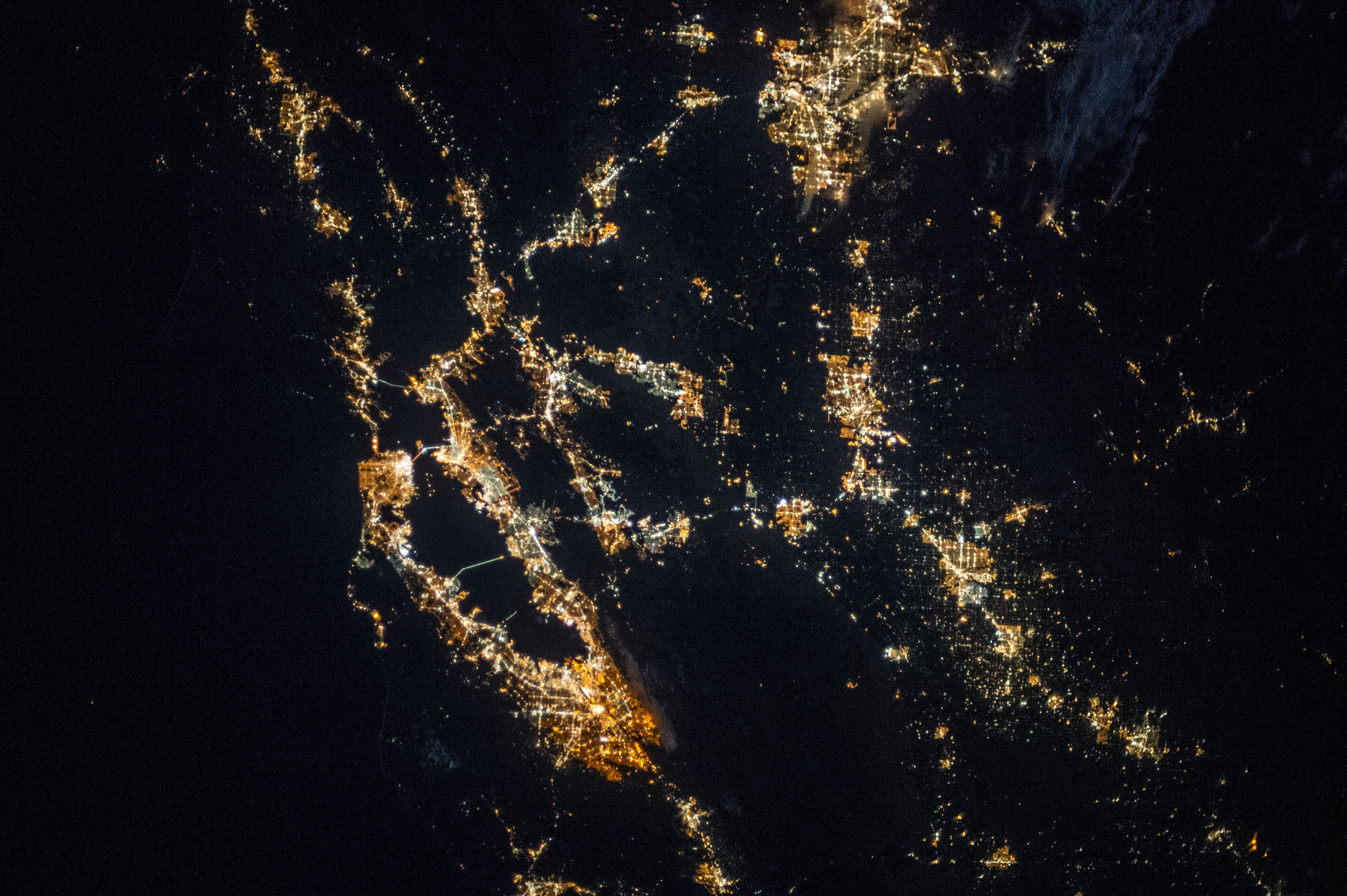
Satellite image of Northern California at night

Since the events of the California Gold Rush, Northern California has been a leader on the world's economic, scientific, and cultural stages. From the development of gold mining techniques and logging practices in the 19th century that were later adopted around the world, to the development of world-famous and online business models (such as Apple, Hewlett-Packard, Google, Yahoo!, and eBay), northern California has been at the forefront of new ways of doing business. In science, advances range from being the first to isolate and name fourteen transuranic chemical elements, to breakthroughs in microchip technology. Cultural contributions include the works of Ansel Adams, George Lucas, and Clint Eastwood, as well as beatniks, the Summer of Love, winemaking, the cradle of the international environmental movement, and the open, casual workplace first popularized in the Silicon Valley dot-com boom and now widely in use around the world. Other examples of innovation across diverse fields range from Genentech (development and commercialization of genetic engineering) to CrossFit as a pioneer in extreme human fitness and training. It is also home to one of the largest Air Force Bases on the West Coast, and the largest in California by square meters, Travis Air Force Base.

== Cities ==
Northern California's largest metropolitan area is the San Francisco Bay Area which consists of 9 counties: Alameda, Contra Costa, Marin, Napa, San Francisco, San Mateo, Santa Clara, Solano, and Sonoma counties. The Bay Area consists of the major cities of San Jose, San Francisco, Oakland, and their many suburbs. Although not a part of the Bay Area, in recent years the Bay Area has drawn more commuters from as far as Central Valley cities such as Sacramento, Stockton, Fresno, Turlock and Modesto. These cities in the central part of the Central Valley and Sierra Nevada foothills may be viewed as part of a single megalopolis. The 2010 U.S. Census showed that the Bay Area grew at a faster rate than the Greater Los Angeles Area while Greater Sacramento had the largest growth rate of any metropolitan area in California.

The state's larger inland cities are considered part of Northern California in cases when the state is divided into two parts. Key cities in the region which are not in major metropolitan areas include Eureka on the far North Coast, Redding, at the northern end of the Central Valley, Chico, and Yuba City in the mid-north of the Central Valley, as well as Fresno and Visalia on the southern end. Though smaller in each case, with the notable exception of Fresno, than the larger cities of the general region, these smaller regional centers are often of historical and economic importance for their respective size, due to their locations, which are primarily rural or otherwise isolated.

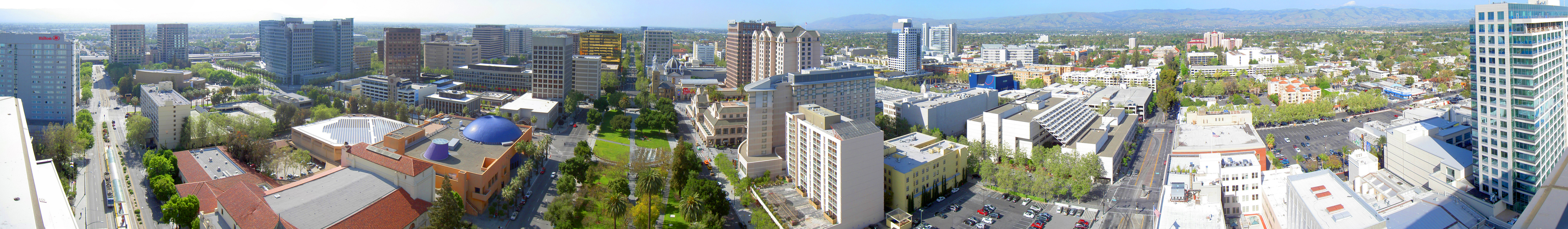
San Jose, the most populous city in Northern California and the San Francisco Bay Area, and the 13th most populous city in the United States.

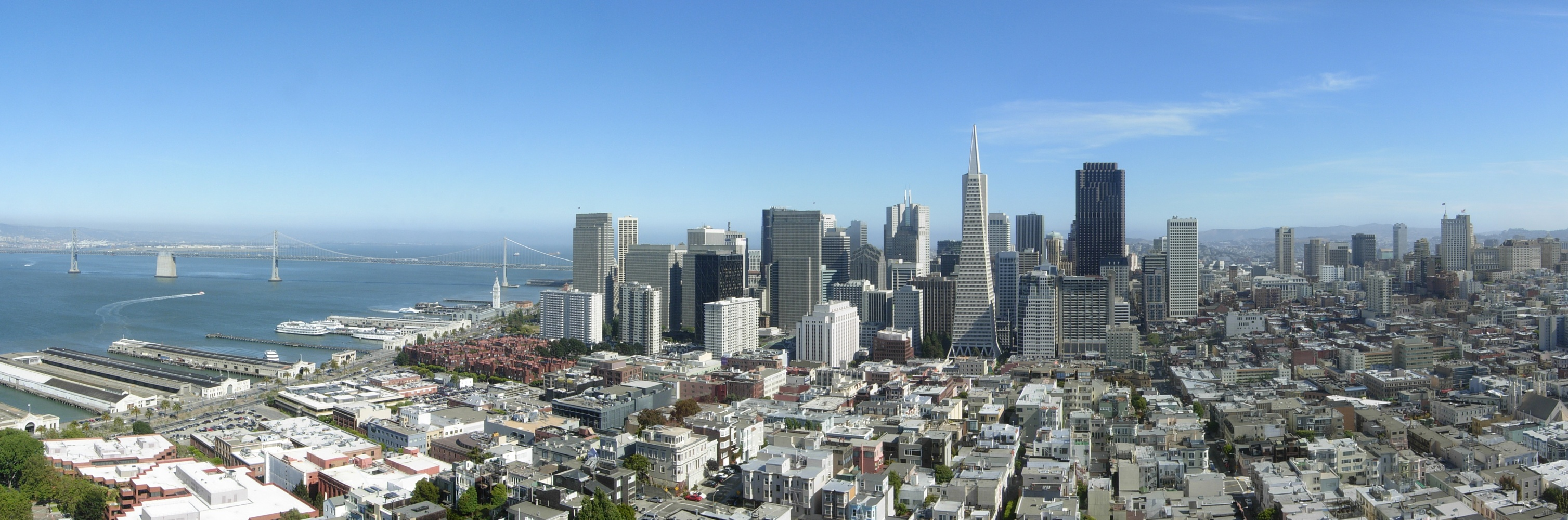
San Francisco, the second most populated city in Northern California and a major economic, cultural, and financial center for the region.

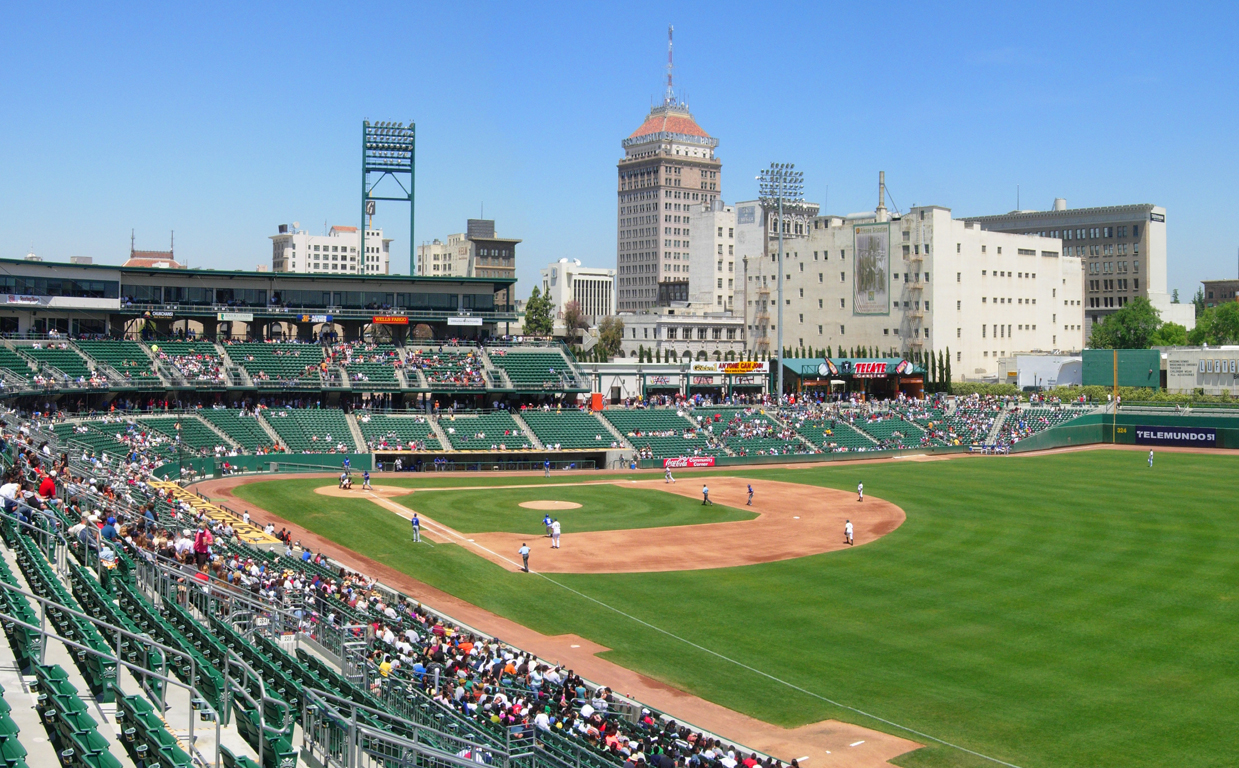
Fresno, the fourth most populated city in northern California, as seen from Chukchansi Park. Fresno is the largest city by population in the San Joaquin Valley.

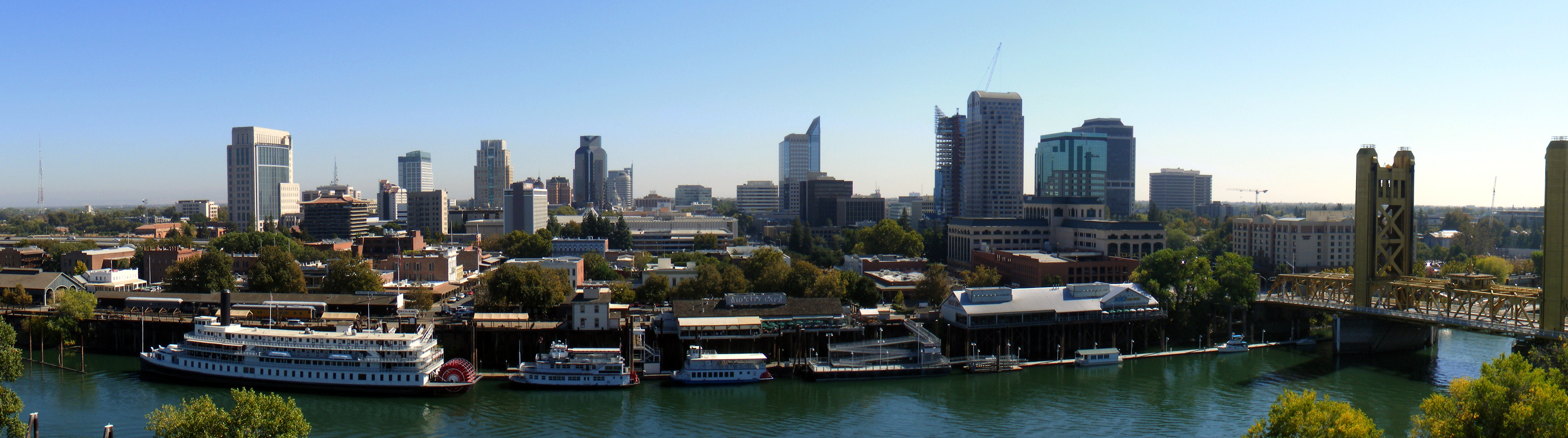
Sacramento, the third most populous city in Northern California, the capital city of the State of California, and the principal city of the Sacramento metropolitan area.

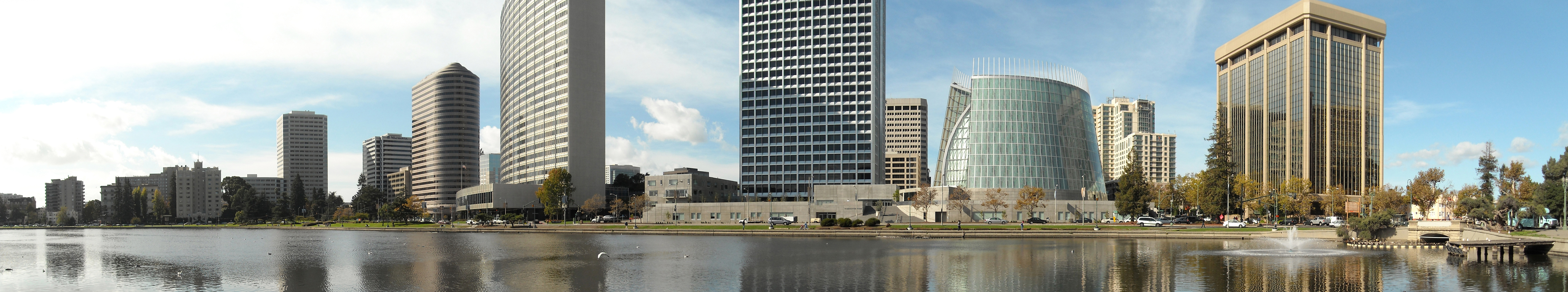
Oakland, the fifth-largest city by population in Northern California. Oakland is the major port city of the region and the center of Northern California's African American community.

== History ==
Map of negotiation of the border between Mexico and the United States (1845-1848) as part of the American intervention in México.

=== Prehistory to 1847 ===
Inhabited for millennia by Native Americans, from the Shasta tribe in the north, to the Miwoks in the central coast and Sierra Nevada, to the Yokuts of the southern Central Valley, northern California was among the most densely populated areas of pre-Columbian North America.

==== European explorers ====
The first European to explore the coast was Juan Rodríguez Cabrillo, sailing for the Spanish Crown; in 1542, Cabrillo's expedition sailed perhaps as far north as the Rogue River in today's Oregon. Beginning in 1565, the Spanish Manila galleons crossed the Pacific Ocean from Mexico to the Spanish Philippines, with silver and gemstones from Mexico. The Manila galleons returned across the northern Pacific, and reached North America usually off the coast of northern California, and then continued south with their Asian trade goods to Mexico.

In 1579, northern California was visited by the English explorer Sir Francis Drake who landed north of today's San Francisco and claimed the area for England. In 1602, the Spaniard Sebastián Vizcaíno explored California's coast as far north as Monterey Bay, where he went ashore. Other Spanish explorers sailed along the coast of northern California for the next 150 years, but no settlements were established.

==== Spanish era ====
The first European inhabitants were Spanish missionaries, who built missions along the California coast. The mission at Monterey was first established in 1770, and at San Francisco in 1776. In all, ten missions stretched along the coast from Sonoma to Monterey (and still more missions to the southern tip of Baja California). In 1786, the French signaled their interest in the northern California area by sending a voyage of exploration to Monterey.

The first twenty years of the 19th century continued the colonization of the northern California coast by Spain. By 1820, Spanish influence extended inland approximately 25 to 50 miles (80 km) from the missions. Outside of this zone, perhaps 200,000 to 250,000 Native Americans continued to lead traditional lives. The Adams-Onís Treaty, signed in 1819 between Spain and the young United States, set the northern boundary of the Spanish claims at the 42nd parallel, effectively creating today's northern boundary of northern California.

==== Russian presence ====
In 1812, the Russian state-sponsored Russian-American Company established Fort Ross, a fur trading outpost on the coast of today's Sonoma County. Fort Ross was the southernmost Russian settlement, located some 60 miles (97 km) north of Spanish colonies in San Francisco. In 1839, the settlement was abandoned due to its inability to meet resource demands, and the increasing Mexican and American presence in the region.

==== Mexican era ====
After Mexico gained independence from Spain in 1821, Mexico continued Spain's missions and settlements in northern California as well as Spain's territorial claims. The Mexican Californios (Spanish-speaking Californians) in these settlements primarily traded cattle hides and tallow with American and European merchant vessels.

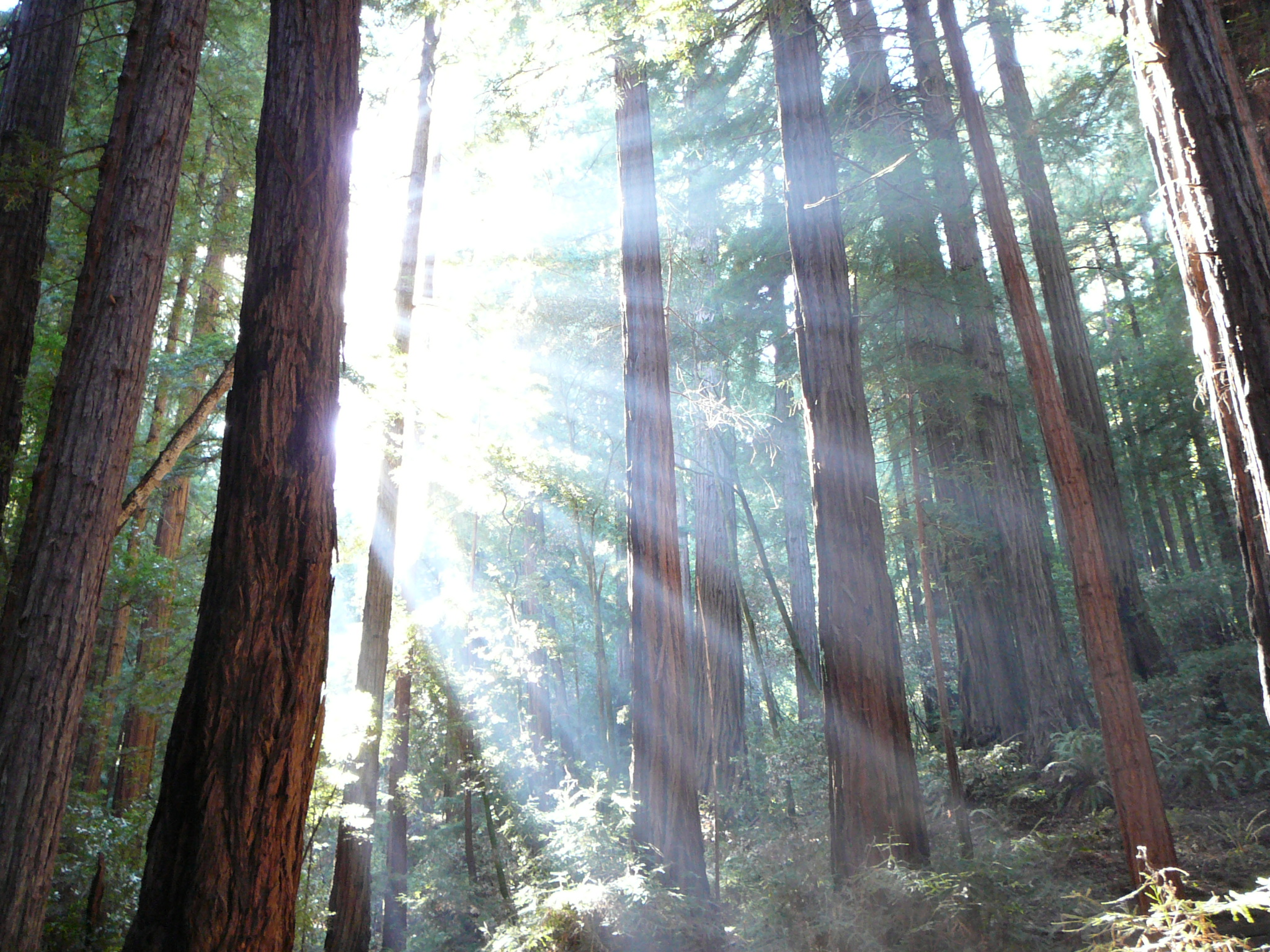
Coast Redwoods in Muir Woods National Monument, in Marin County

In 1825, the Hudson's Bay Company established a major trading post just north of today's Portland, Oregon. British fur trappers and hunters then used the Siskiyou Trail to travel throughout northern California. The leader of a further French scientific expedition to northern California, Eugene Duflot de Mofras, wrote in 1840 "...it is evident that California will belong to whatever nation chooses to send there a man-of-war and two hundred men." By the 1830s, a significant number of non-Californios had immigrated to northern California. Chief among these was John Sutter, a European immigrant from Switzerland, who was granted 48,827 acres (197.60 km^{2}) centered on the area of today's Sacramento.

==== American interest ====
American trappers began entering northern California in the 1830s. In 1834, American visionary Ewing Young led a herd of horses and mules over the Siskiyou Trail from missions in northern California to British and American settlements in Oregon. Although a small number of American traders and trappers had lived in northern California since the early 1830s, the first organized overland party of American immigrants to arrive in northern California was the Bartleson-Bidwell Party of 1841 via the new California Trail. Also in 1841, an overland exploratory party of the United States Exploring Expedition came down the Siskiyou Trail from the Pacific Northwest. In 1846, the Donner Party earned notoriety as they struggled to enter northern California.

==== Californian independence and beginning of the United States era ====
When the Mexican–American War was declared on May 13, 1846, it took almost two months (mid-July 1846) for word to get to California. On June 14, 1846, some 30 non-Mexican settlers, mostly Americans, staged a revolt and seized the small Mexican garrison in Sonoma. They raised the "Bear Flag" of the California Republic over Sonoma. The "Bear Flag Republic" lasted only 26 days, until the U.S. Army, led by John Frémont, took over on July 9. The California state flag today is based on this original Bear Flag, and continues to contain the words "California Republic."

Commodore John Drake Sloat ordered his naval forces to occupy Yerba Buena (present San Francisco) on July 7 and within days American forces controlled San Francisco, Sonoma, and Sutter's Fort in Sacramento. The treaty ending the Mexican–American War was signed on February 2, 1848, and Mexico formally ceded Alta California (including all of present-day northern California) to the United States.

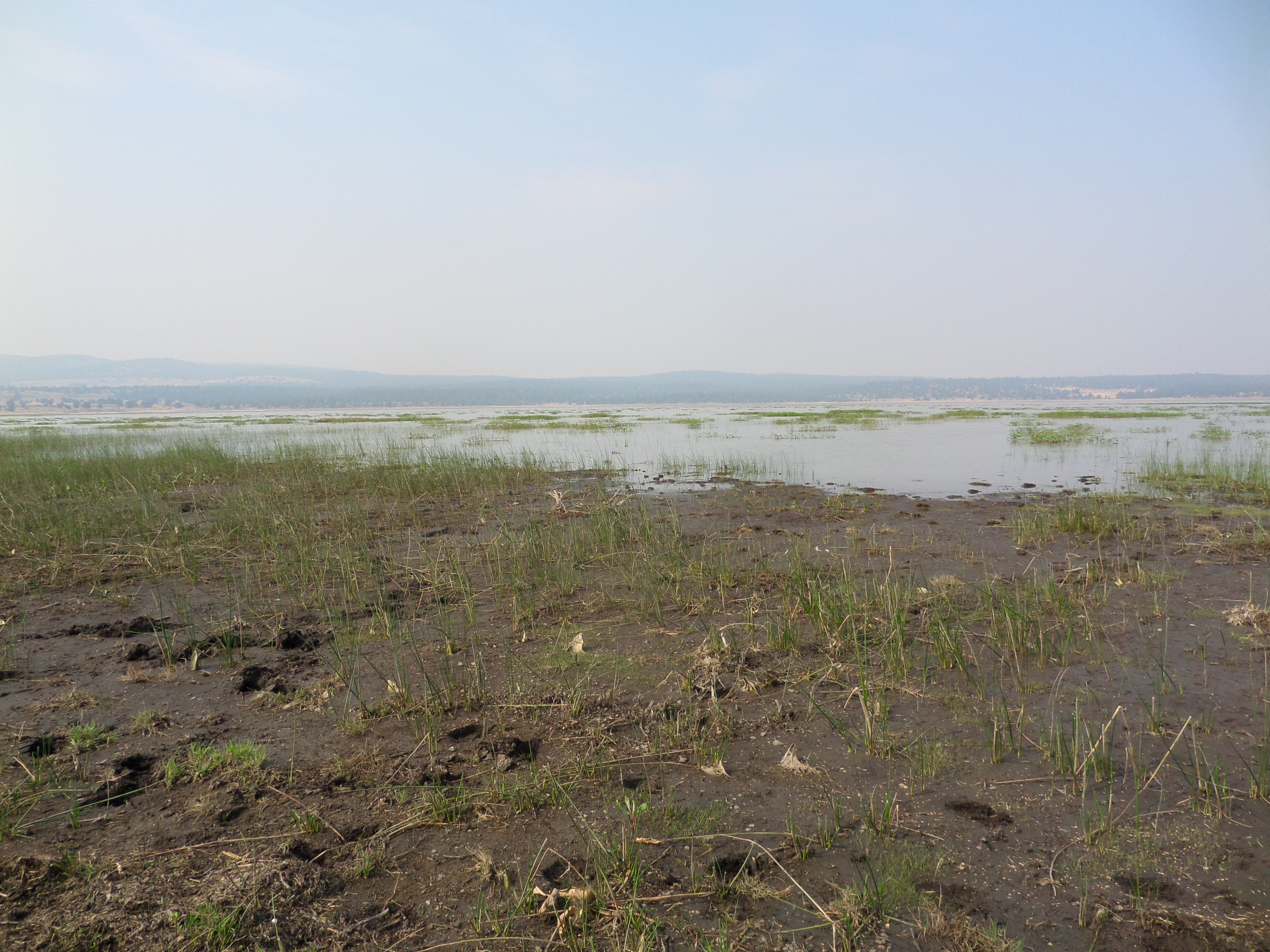
Moon Lake in Lassen County, California

=== Gold Rush and California statehood ===
The California Gold Rush took place almost exclusively in northern California from 1848 to 1855. It began on January 24, 1848, when gold was discovered at Sutter's Mill in Coloma. News of the discovery soon spread, resulting in some 300,000 people coming to California from the rest of the United States and abroad. San Francisco grew from a tiny hamlet, home to about 1,000 Californios into a boomtown of over 50,000 people in the 12 years between 1848 and 1860. New roads, churches, and schools were built, and new towns sprung up, aided in part by the development of new methods of transportation such as steamships which came into regular service and railroads which now connected the coasts. The Gold Rush also had negative effects: American colonists chose to use genocide as a tool to remove the Indigenous people so that they could look for gold on their land.

The Gold Rush also increased pressure to make California a U.S. state. Pro-slavery politicians initially attempted to permanently divide northern and southern California at 36 degrees, 30 minutes, the line of the Missouri Compromise. But instead, the passing of the Compromise of 1850 enabled California to be admitted to the Union as a free state.

=== Population and agricultural expansion (1855–1899) ===
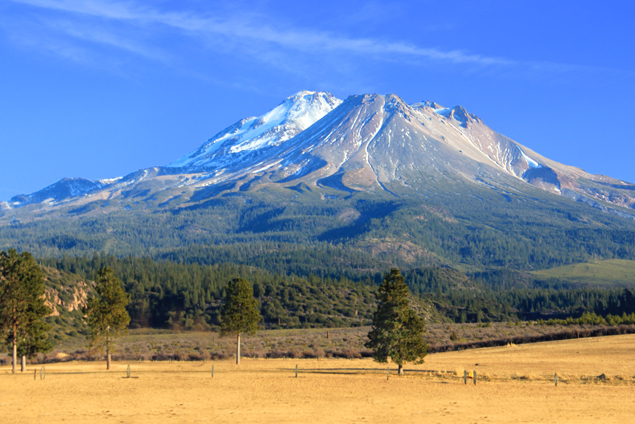
Farm near Mount Shasta

The decades following the Gold Rush brought dramatic expansion to northern California, both in population and economically – particularly in agriculture. The completion of the First transcontinental railroad in 1869, with its terminus in Sacramento (and then later, Oakland), meant that northern California's agricultural produce (and some manufactured goods) could now be shipped economically to the rest of the United States. In return, immigrants from the rest of the United States (and Europe) could comfortably come to northern California. A network of railroads spread throughout northern California, and in 1887, a rail link was completed to the Pacific Northwest. Almost all of these railways came under the control of the Southern Pacific Railroad, headquartered in San Francisco, and San Francisco continued as a financial and cultural center.

Substantial tensions during this era included nativist sentiments (primarily against Chinese immigrants), tensions between the increasing power of the Southern Pacific Railroad and small farmers, and the beginnings of the labor union movement.

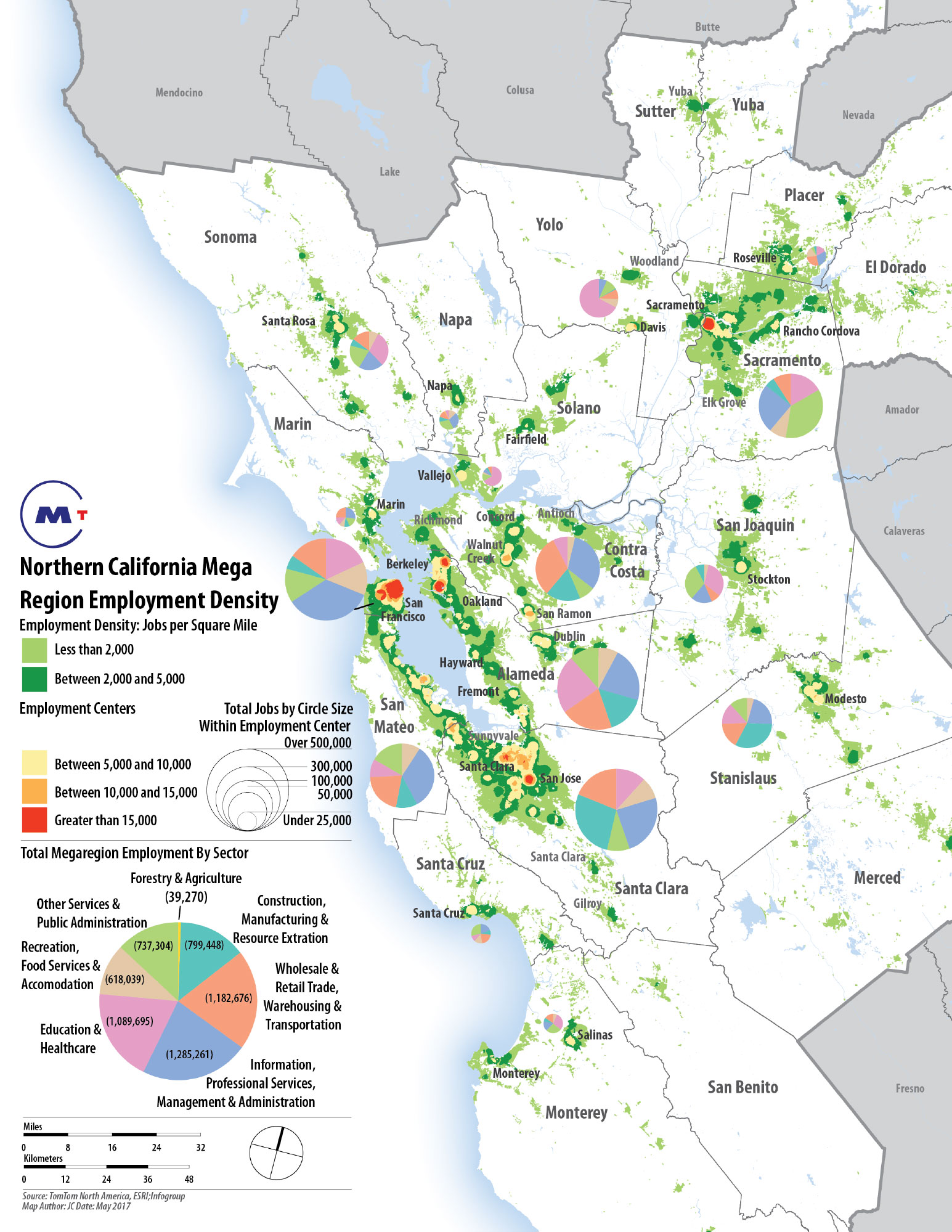
Map visualizing employment statistics in Northern California in 2017

== Economy ==
Northern California's economy is noted for being the de facto world leader in high-tech industry (software, semiconductor/micro-electronics, biotechnology and medical devices/instruments), as well as being known for clean power, biomedical, government, and finance. Other significant industries include tourism, shipping, manufacturing, and agriculture. Its economy is diverse, though more concentrated in high technology. It is home to the state capital, as well as the western branches of federal agencies and courts, including the Federal Reserve, United States Court of Appeals for the Ninth Circuit, and United States District Court for the Northern District of California.

=== Megaregion ===
- Map of the Northern California Megaregion
San Francisco–Oakland Metropolitan Area
San Jose Metropolitan Area
Sacramento MSA and Truckee µSA
North Bay (Santa Rosa, Napa, Vallejo)
Northern San Joaquin Valley
Yuba City Metropolitan Area
Monterey Bay Area

Northern California is one of the 11 economic megaregions of the United States. Northern California is the fifth-most populous megaregion, has the highest gross regional product per capita of any megaregion ($96,029 per capita and $1.21 trillion in total), and makes up 5.9% of the U.S. economy. 188,000 commuters cross among Northern California's population centers daily, including 132,000 people commuting into the San Francisco Bay Area.

The most common definition of the megaregion consists of the San Francisco Bay Area, Greater Sacramento, much of the San Joaquin Valley, and the Monterey Bay Area.

The concept of Northern California as an ecomomic megaregion is increasingly relevant in the context of a rapidly growing economy plagued by transportation issues and a lack of affordable housing. Multiple regional governance authorities have integrated the concept into commute pattern analyses and future transportation planning.

== Climate ==
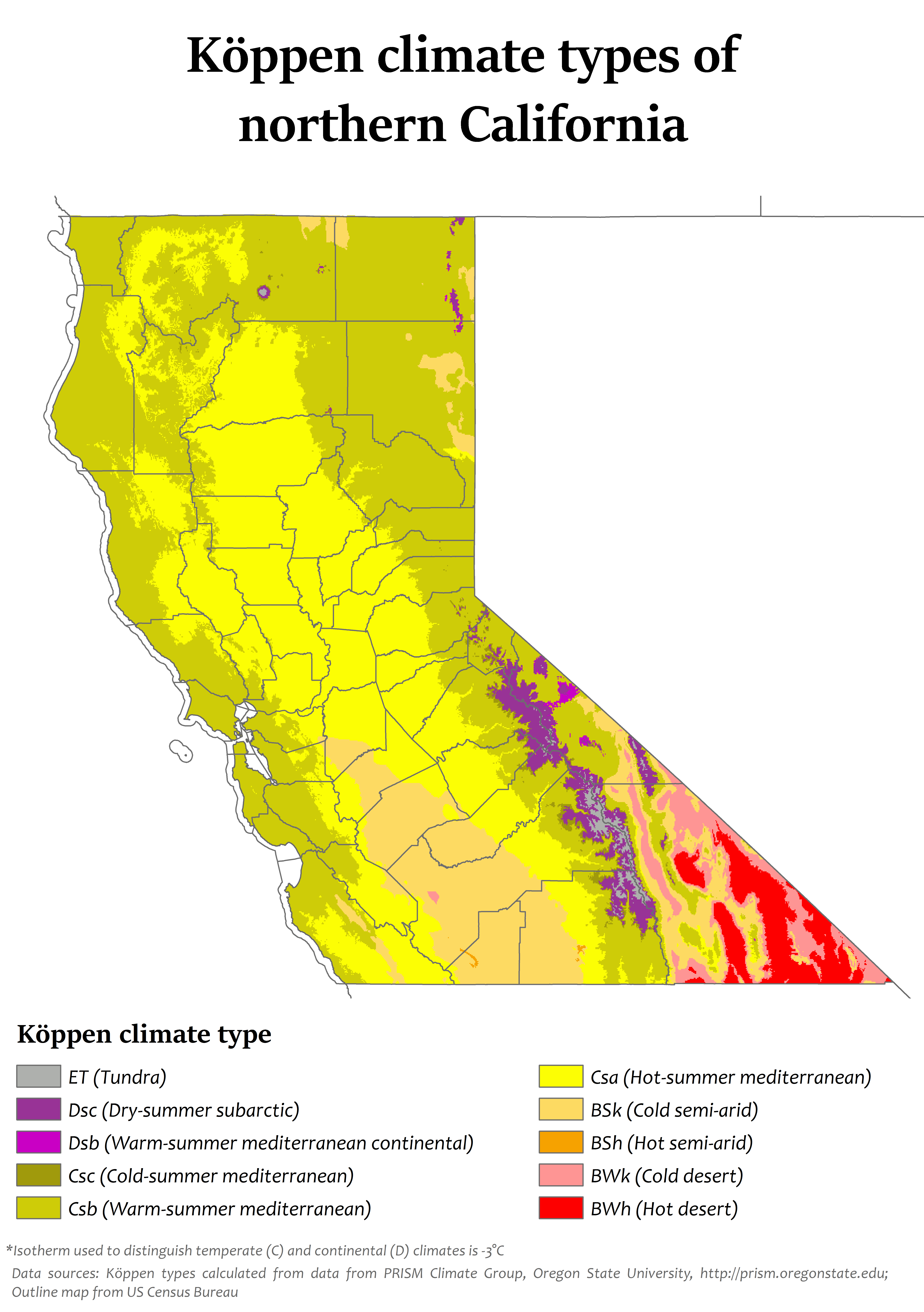
Köppen climate types in northern California

Northern California has a warm or mild to cool climate, in which the Sierra mountains gets snow in the late fall through winter and occasionally into spring. Summers are mild along the coast and generally warm and dry, while winters are cool and usually wet. The high temperatures range from 50s °F (10–15 °C) to 30s °F (−1 – +4 °C) in the winters while summers temperature range is 90s °F (32–37 °C) to 60s °F (15–20 °C) or 50s °F (10–15 °C), with highs well into the 100s °F (37–42 °C) for the Sacramento region. Snow covers the mountains (generally above 3,000 feet (910 m)) in mid January through February. Fog occurs infrequently or occurs normally in the west and coast, especially in the summer, creating some of the coolest summer conditions in North America. Since the first decade of the 21st century, droughts and wildfires have increased in frequency as a consequence of climate change.

== Population ==
Historical population
Census	Pop.	Note	%±
1850	86,105		—
1860	346,714		302.7%
1870	516,089		48.9%
1880	772,778		49.7%
1890	961,628		24.4%
1900	1,147,725		19.4%
1910	1,569,141		36.7%
1920	2,003,075		27.7%
1930	2,632,273		31.4%
1940	3,066,654		16.5%
1950	4,654,248		51.8%
1960	6,318,482		35.8%
1970	7,849,575		24.2%
1980	9,359,160		19.2%
1990	11,490,926		22.8%
2000	13,234,136		15.2%
2010	14,573,946		10.1%
2020	15,775,319		8.2%

The population of the forty-eight counties of northern California has shown a steady increase over the years.

The largest percentage increase outside the Gold Rush era (52%) came during the 1940s, as the region was the destination of many post-War veterans and their families, attracted by the greatly expanding industrial base and (often) by their time stationed in northern California during World War II. The largest absolute increase occurred during the 1980s (over 2.1 million person increase), attracted by job opportunities in part by the expansion taking place in Silicon Valley and the Cold War–era expansion of the defense industry. Since the 2000 U.S. Census, Northern California has grown at a faster rate than Southern California due to the strong economic performances of the Bay Area and Sacramento.

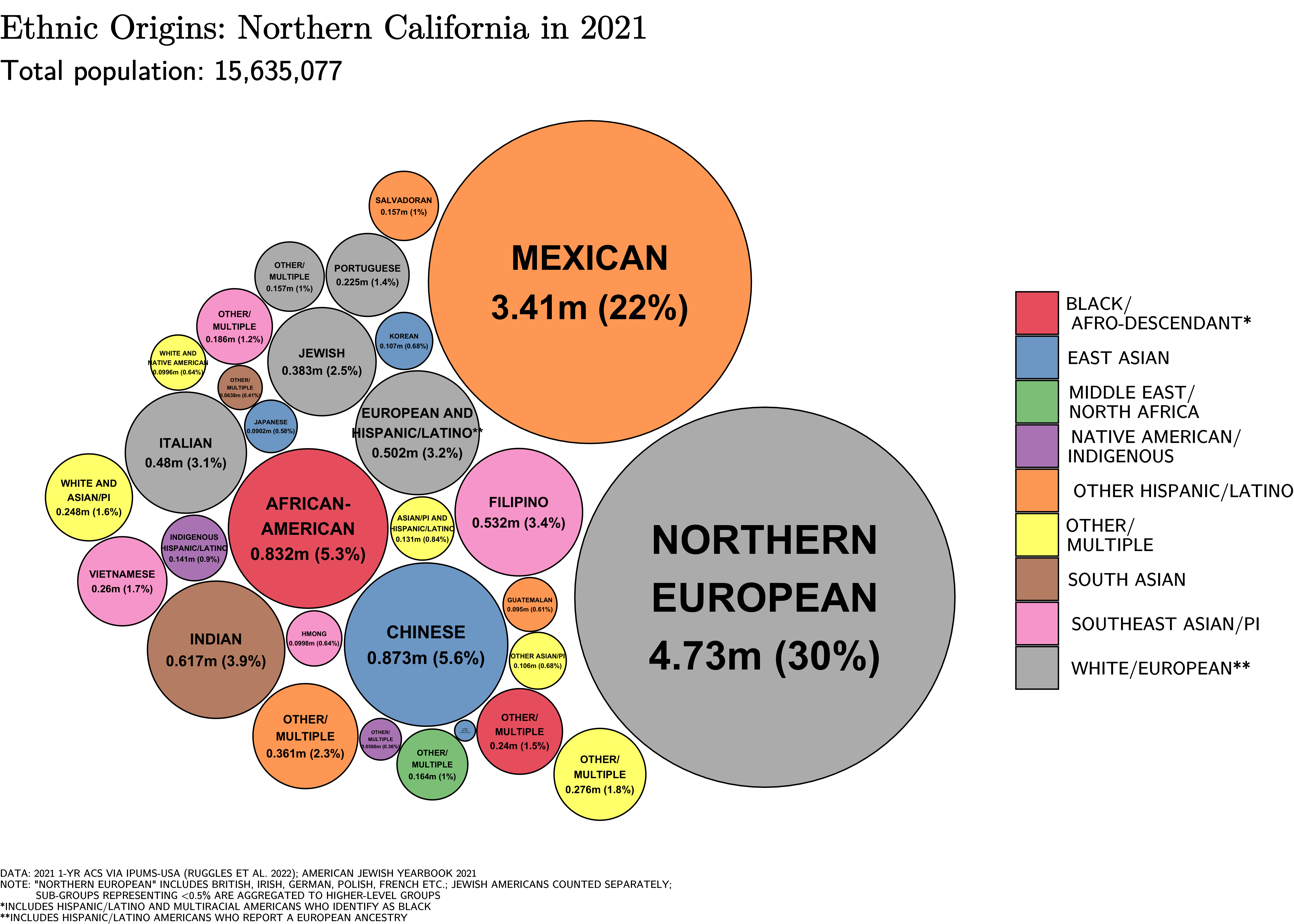
Ethnic origins in Northern California

== Parks and other protected areas ==
=== National Park System ===
The U.S. National Park System controls a large and diverse group of parks in northern California. The best known is Yosemite National Park, which is displayed on the reverse side of the California state quarter. Other prominent parks are the Kings Canyon-Sequoia National Park complex, Redwood National Park, Pinnacles National Park, Lassen Volcanic National Park and the largest in the contiguous forty-eight states, Death Valley National Park.

=== National Monuments and other federally protected areas ===
Other areas under federal protection include Muir Woods National Monument, Giant Sequoia National Monument, Devils Postpile National Monument, Lava Beds National Monument, Point Reyes National Seashore, the Monterey Bay National Marine Sanctuary, and the Cordell Bank and Gulf of the Farallones National Marine Sanctuaries (both off the coast of San Francisco). Included within the latter National Marine Sanctuary is the Farallon National Wildlife Refuge; this National Wildlife Refuge is one of approximately twenty-five such refuges in northern California. National forests occupy large sections of northern California, including the Shasta–Trinity, Klamath, Modoc, Lassen, Mendocino, Eldorado, Tahoe, and Sequoia national forests, among others. Included within (or adjacent to) national forests are federally protected wilderness areas, including the Trinity Alps, Castle Crags, Granite Chief, and Desolation wilderness areas.

In addition, the California Coastal National Monument protects all islets, reefs, and rock outcroppings from the shore of northern California out to a distance of 12 nmi (22 km), along the entire northern California coastline. In addition, the National Park Service administers protected areas on Alcatraz Island, the Golden Gate National Recreation Area, Whiskeytown–Shasta–Trinity National Recreation Area, and the Smith River National Recreation Area. The NPS also administers the Manzanar National Historic Site in Inyo County, the Rosie the Riveter World War II Home Front National Historical Park in Richmond, and the Tule Lake National Monument outside of Tulelake.

=== Other ===
- Tilden Regional Park
- Alum Rock Park
- Angel Island
- Bidwell Park
- Big Basin Redwoods State Park
- Butano State Park
- Calaveras Big Trees State Park
- Castle Rock State Park
- Caswell Memorial State Park
- East Bay Regional Park District
- Farallon Islands
- Golden Gate Park
- Henry W. Coe State Park
- Humboldt Redwoods State Park
- Jedediah Smith Redwoods State Park
- Lake Tahoe Basin
- Marble Mountain Wilderness
- Mill Creek State Park
- Mount Tamalpais State Park
- Suisun Marsh
- Sacramento River
- Talowa Dunes State Park
- Turtle Bay Exploration Park
- McArthur–Burney Falls Memorial State Park
- Wilder Ranch State Park
- Sequoia National Park

== Educational institutions ==
Northern California hosts a number of world-renowned universities including Stanford University and University of California, Berkeley. Top-tier public graduate schools include Boalt Hall and Hastings law schools and UC San Francisco (a top-ranked medical school) and UC Davis School of Veterinary Medicine, the largest veterinary school in the United States.

=== Public ===
- Six University of California campuses:

- UC Berkeley
- UC Davis
- UC Hastings
- UC Merced
- UC San Francisco
- UC Santa Cruz

- Eleven California State University campuses:

- California Maritime Academy
- Chico State
- CSU East Bay
- CSU Monterey Bay
- Fresno State
- Cal Poly Humboldt
- Sacramento State
- San Francisco State
- San Jose State
- Sonoma State
- Stanislaus State

- A large number of local community colleges

=== Private ===
(Partial list)

- Academy of Art University
- California College of the Arts
- Dominican University of California
- Fresno Pacific University
- Golden Gate University
- Jessup University
- Menlo College
- Northwestern Polytechnic University
- Notre Dame de Namur University
- Pacific Union College
- Samuel Merritt University
- Santa Clara University
- Saint Mary's College of California
- Simpson University
- Stanford University
- Touro University California
- University of San Francisco
- University of the Pacific

=== Research ===
(Partial list)

- American Institute of Mathematics
- Bodega Marine Reserve
- Hopkins Marine Station
- Joint Genome Institute
- Lawrence Berkeley National Laboratory
- Lawrence Livermore National Laboratory
- Lick Observatory
- Long Marine Laboratory
- Mathematical Sciences Research Institute
- Monterey Bay Aquarium Research Institute
- NASA Ames Research Center
- Owens Valley Radio Observatory
- Pacific Institute
- Point Reyes Bird Observatory
- White Mountain Research Station

== Counties ==
- Alameda
- Alpine
- Amador
- Butte
- Calaveras
- Colusa
- Contra Costa
- Del Norte
- El Dorado
- Fresno
- Glenn
- Humboldt
- Inyo
- Kings
- Lake
- Lassen
- Madera
- Marin
- Mariposa
- Mendocino
- Merced
- Modoc
- Mono
- Monterey
- Napa
- Nevada
- Placer
- Plumas
- Sacramento
- San Benito
- San Francisco
- San Joaquin
- San Mateo
- Santa Clara
- Santa Cruz
- Shasta
- Sierra
- Siskiyou
- Solano
- Sonoma
- Stanislaus
- Sutter
- Tehama
- Trinity
- Tulare
- Tuolumne
- Yolo
- Yuba

== Regions ==
The following regions are entirely or partly within northern California:

- Big Sur
- Cascade Range
- Central California
- Central Coast
- Central Valley
- Coastal California
- East Bay (SF)
- Eastern California
- Emerald Triangle
- Gold Country
- Greater Sacramento
- Klamath Basin
- Lake Tahoe
- Lassen Peak
- Lost Coast
- Metropolitan Fresno
- Mount Shasta
- North Bay (SF)
- North Coast
- Russian River
- Sacramento Valley
- San Francisco Bay Area
- San Francisco Peninsula
- San Joaquin Valley
- Santa Clara Valley
- Shasta Cascade
- Sierra Nevada
- Silicon Valley
- South Bay (SF)
- Telecom Valley
- Tri-Valley
- Trinity Alps
- Wine Country
- Yosemite
- Yuba–Sutter area

== Cities and towns with more than 50,000 inhabitants ==
Largest cities (city proper) in northern California

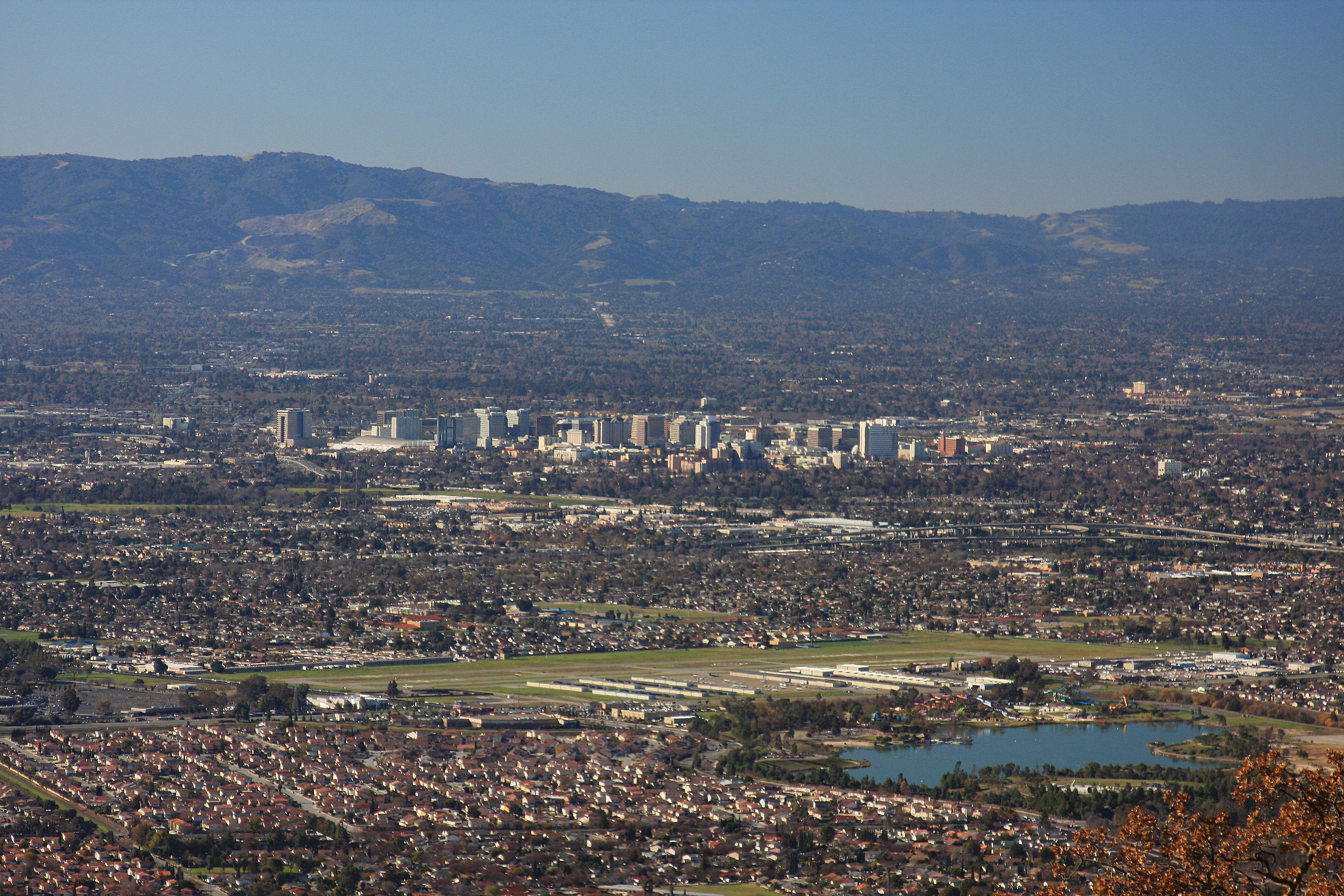
1 – San Jose

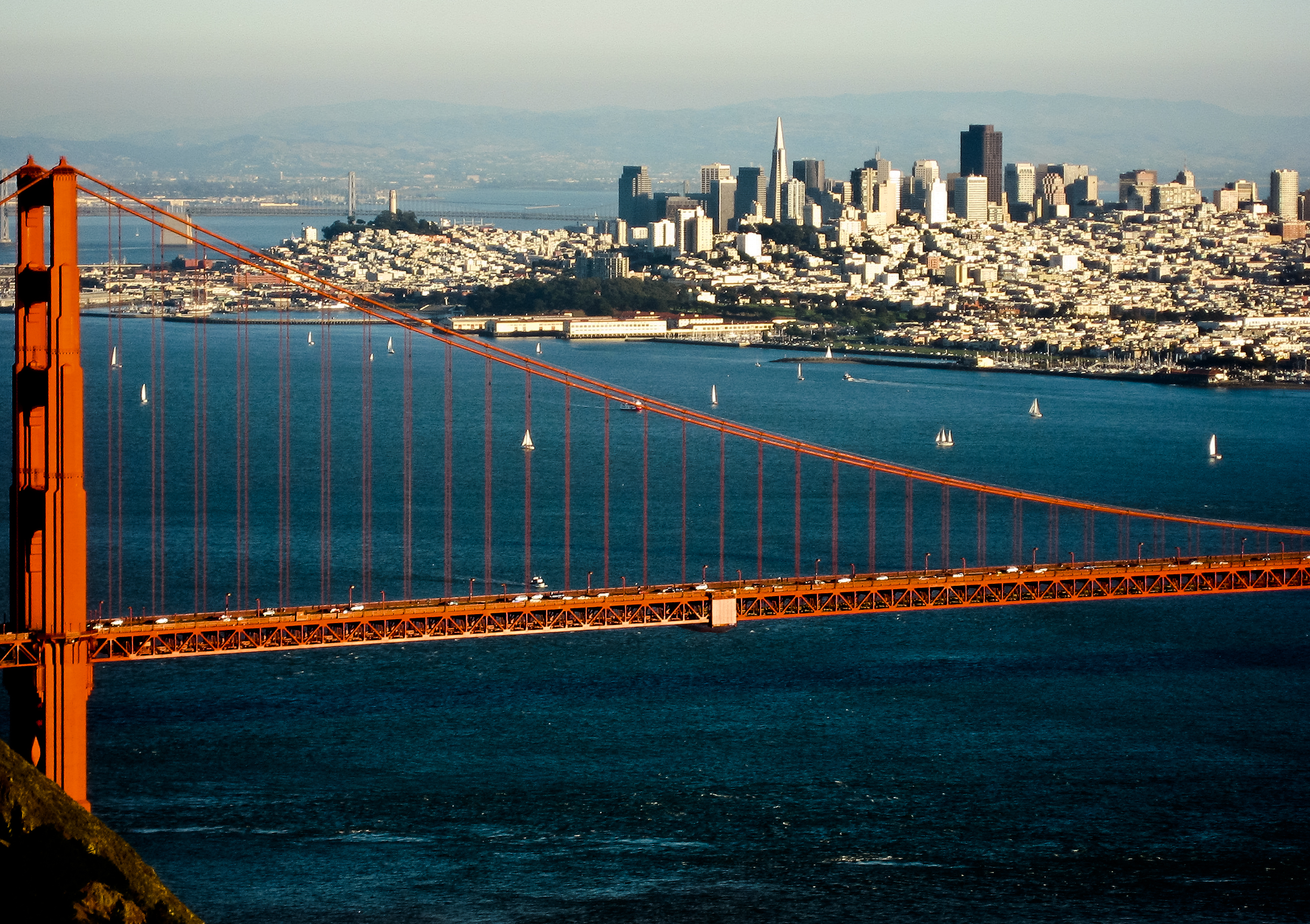
2 – San Francisco

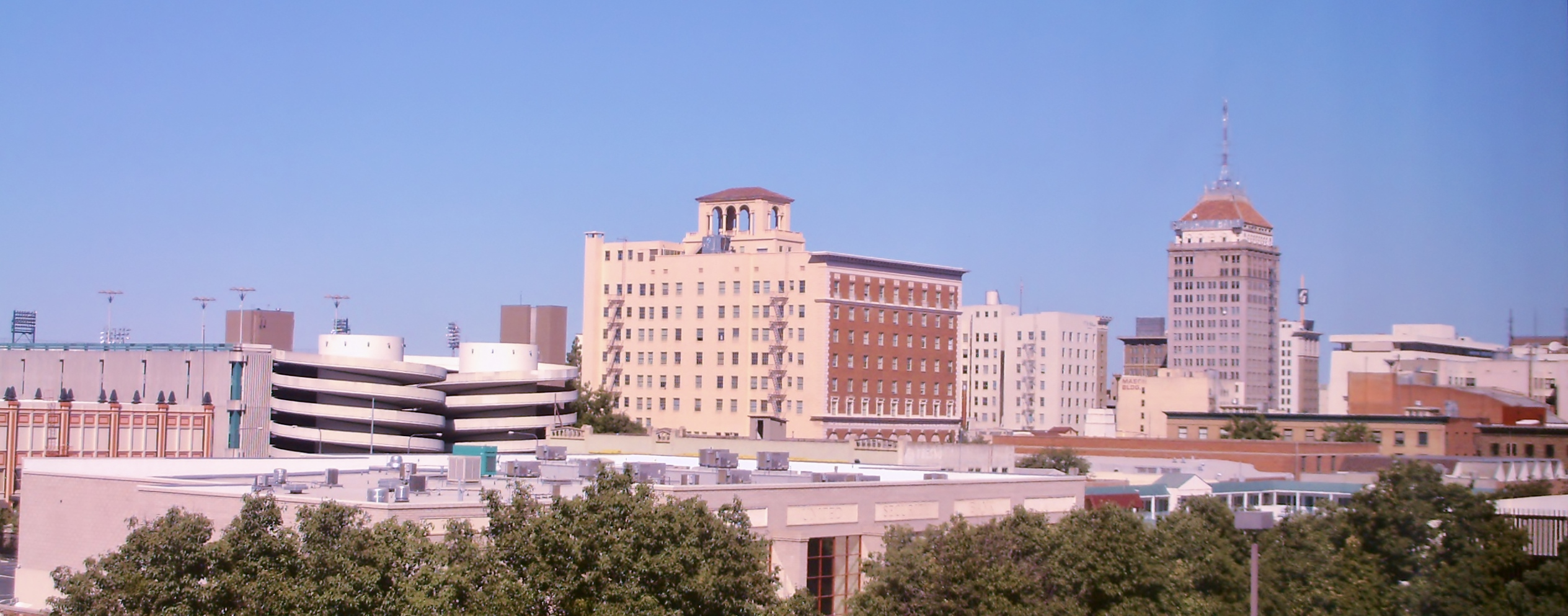
3 – Fresno

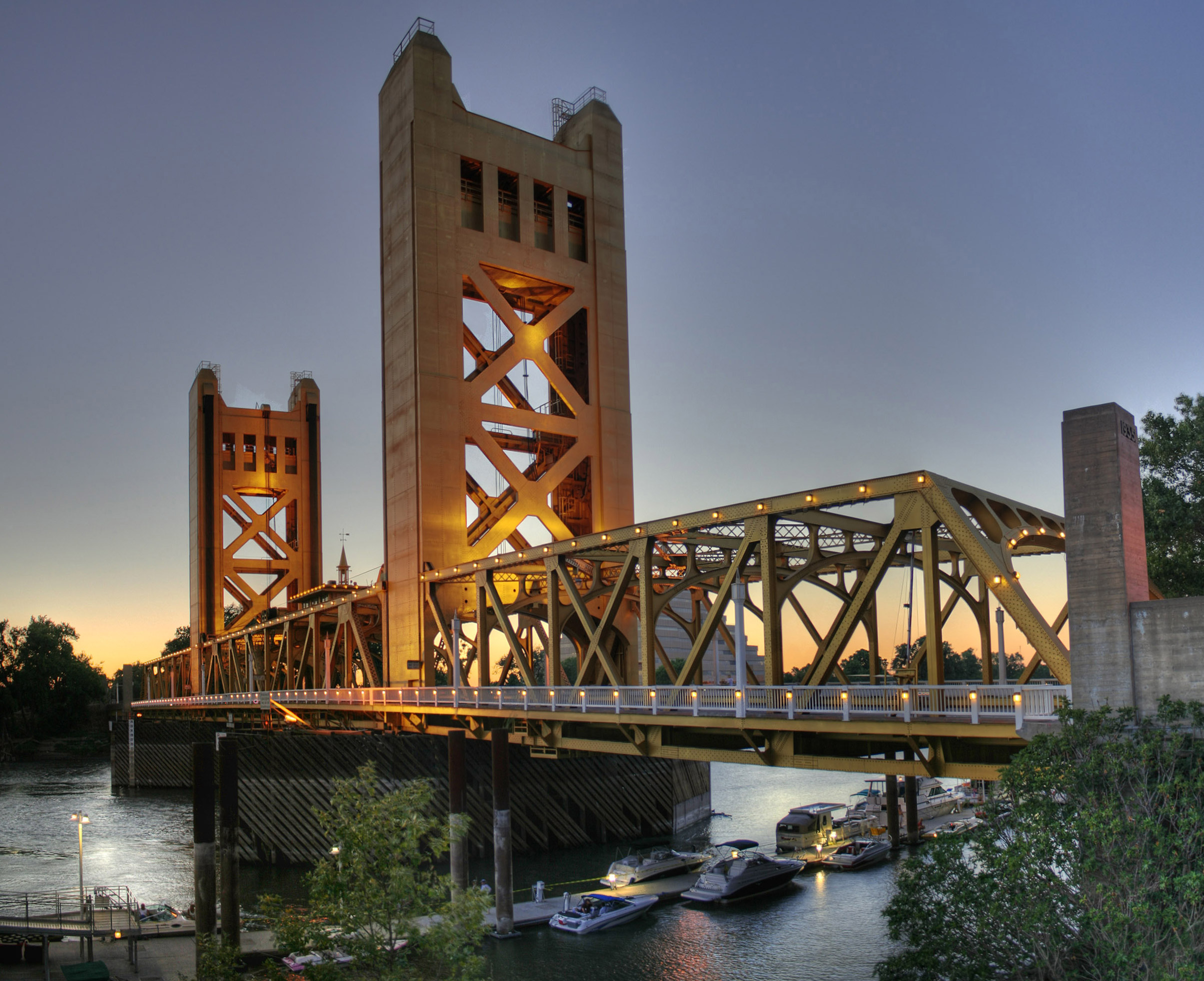
4 – Sacramento

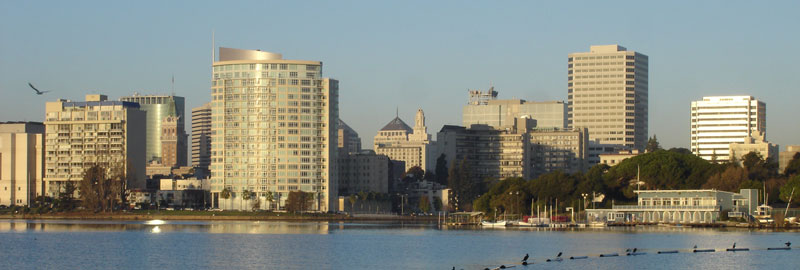
5 – Oakland

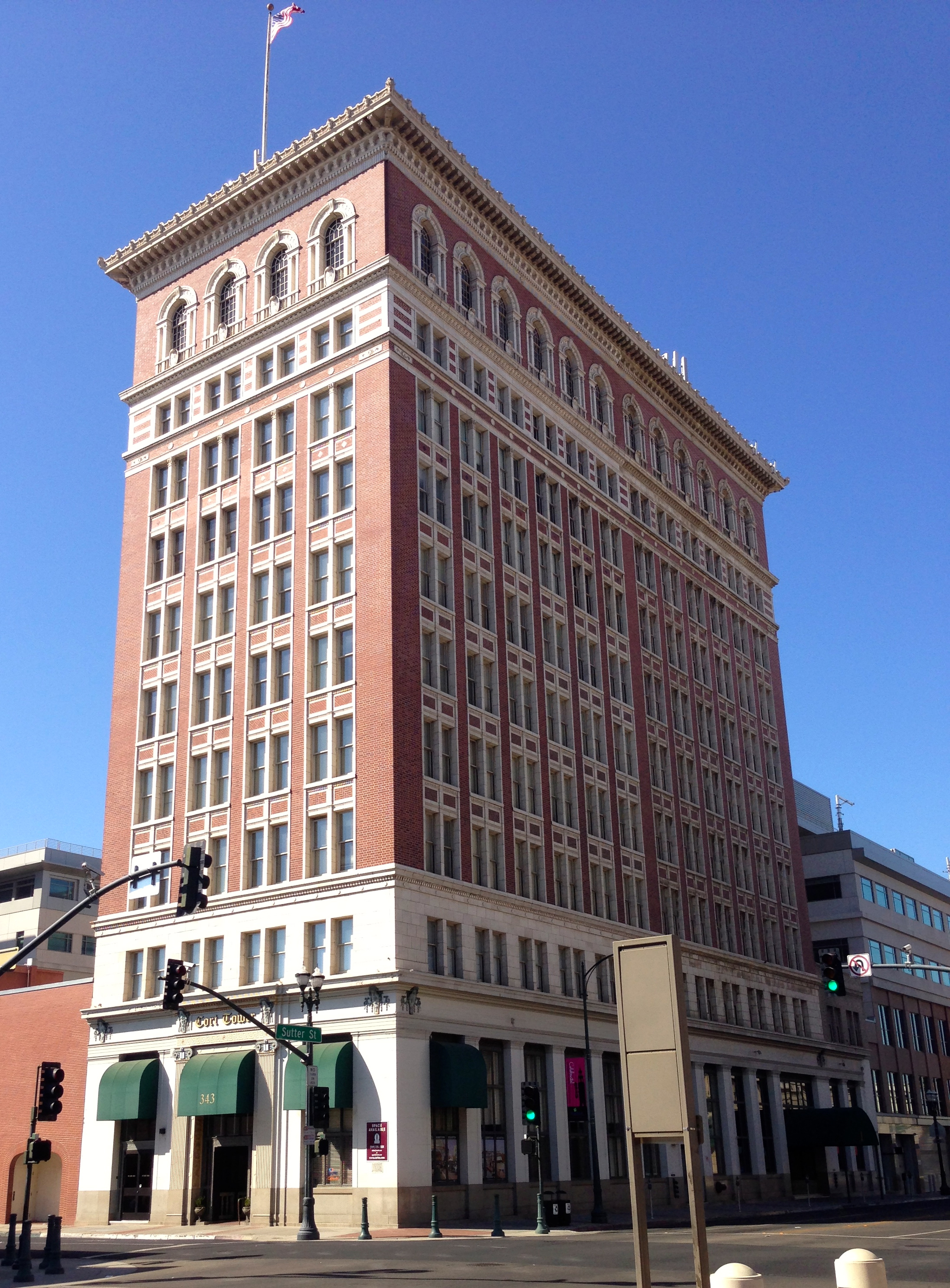
6 – Stockton

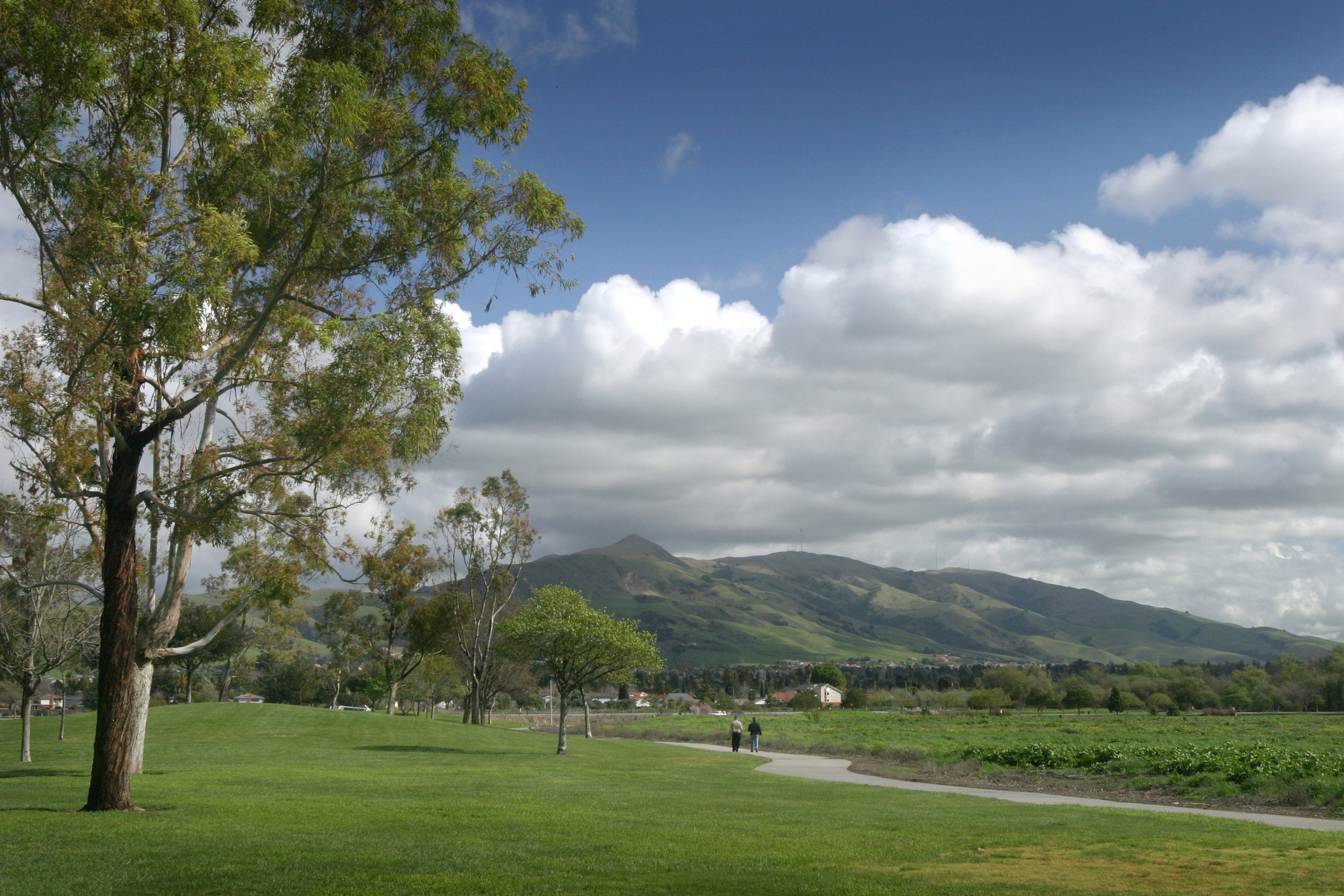
7 – Fremont

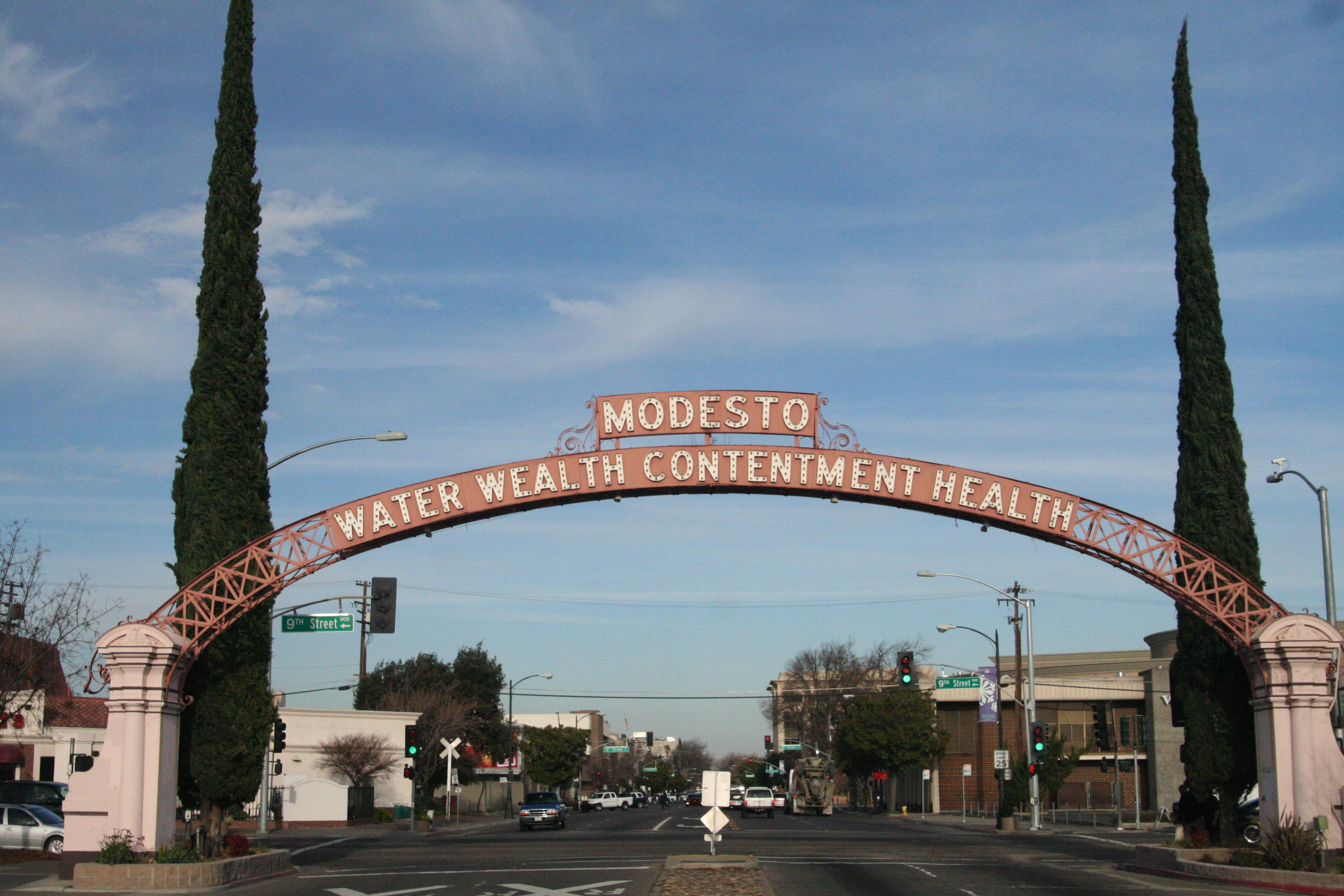
8 – Modesto

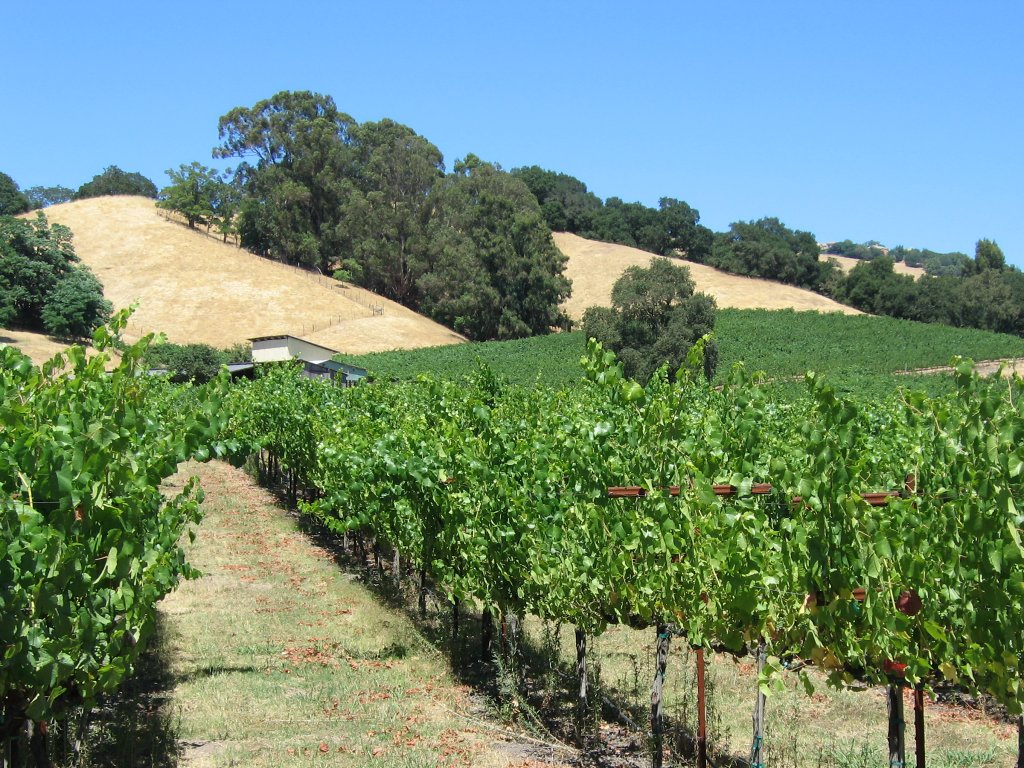
9 – Santa Rosa

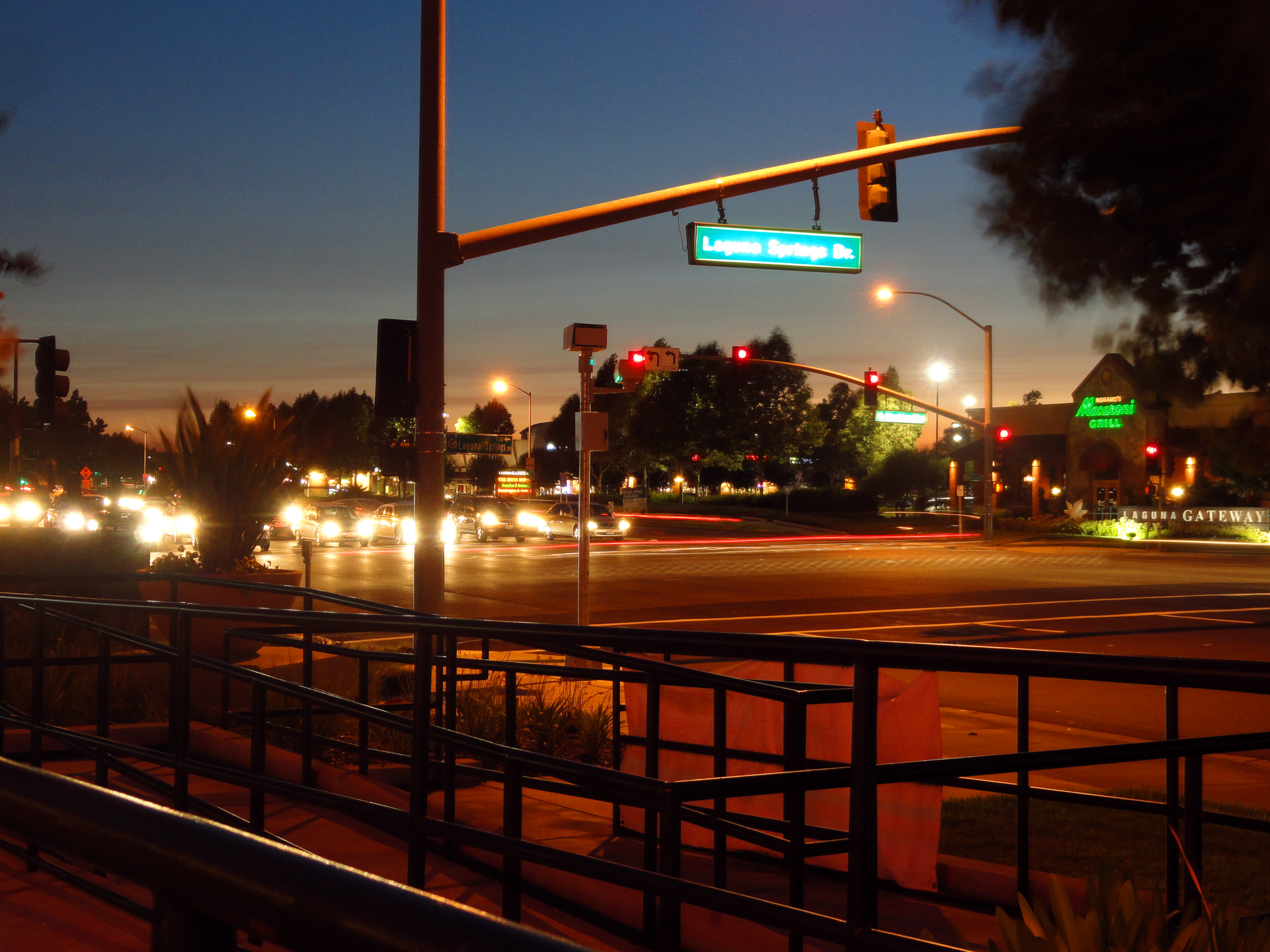
10 – Elk Grove

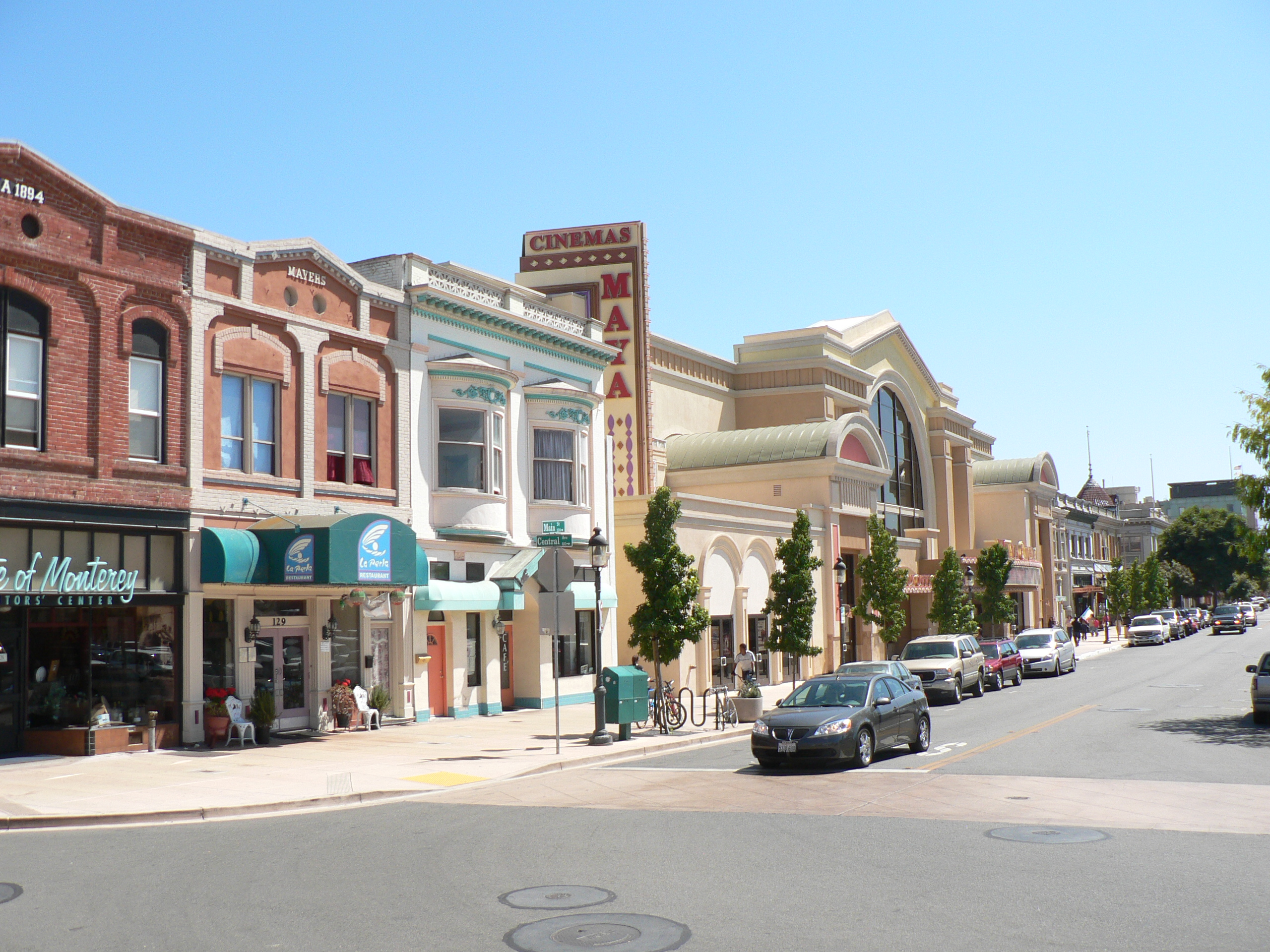
11 – Salinas

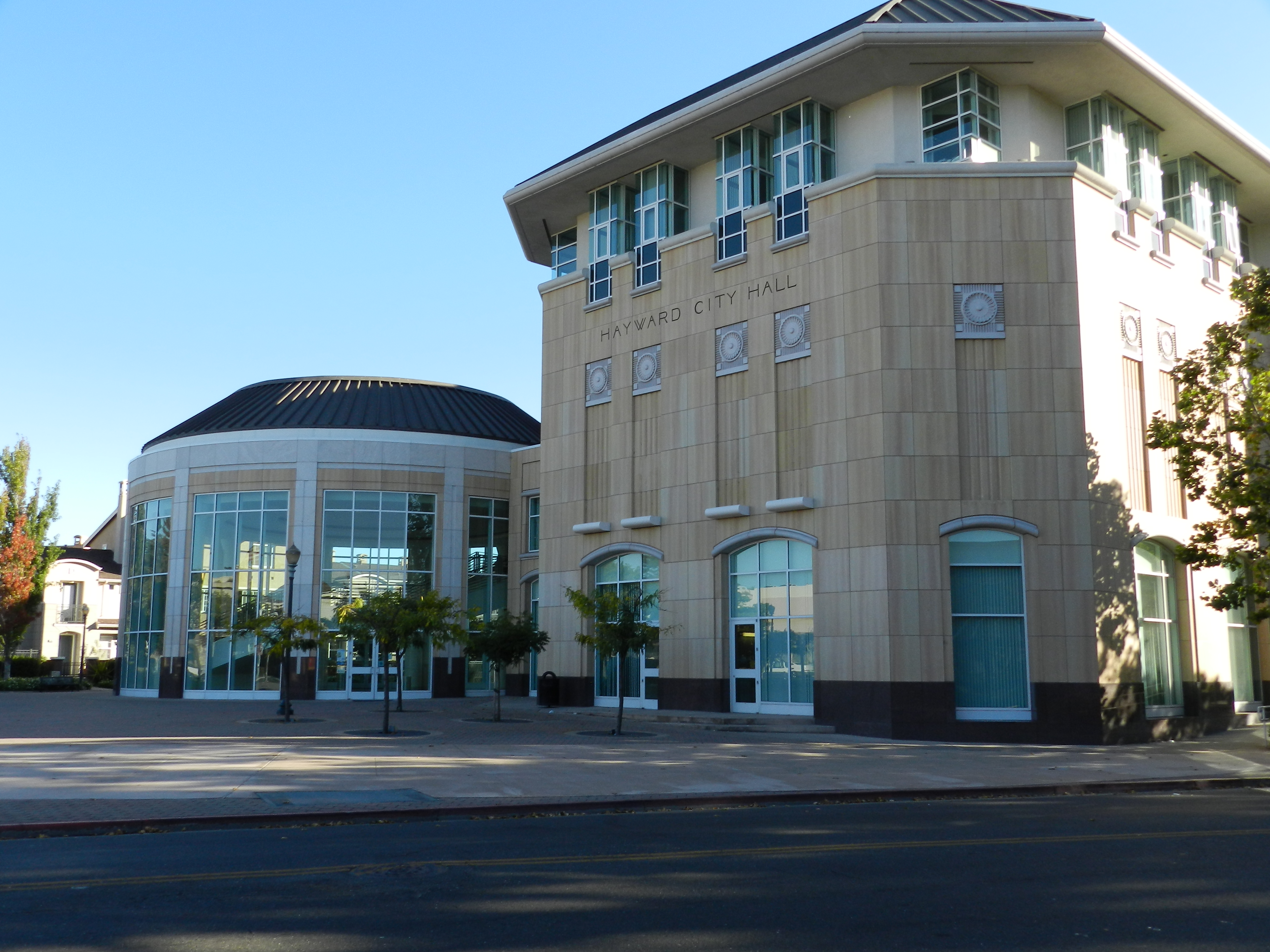
12 – Hayward

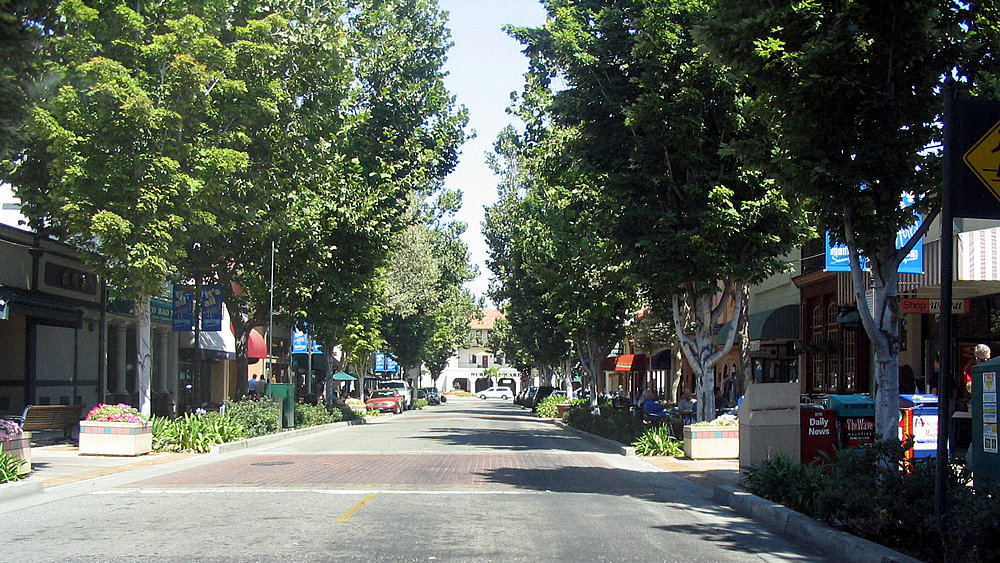
13 – Sunnyvale

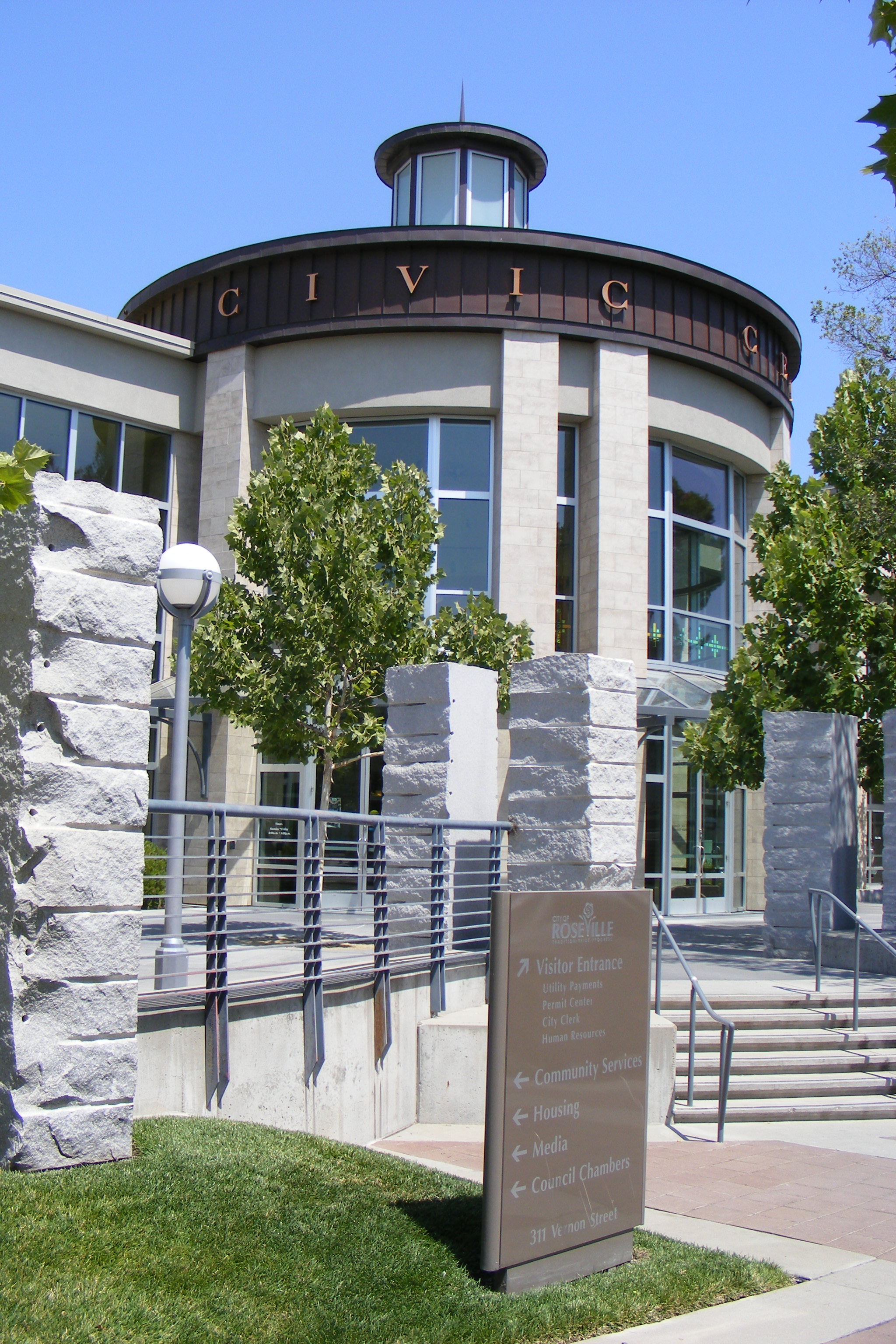
14 – Roseville

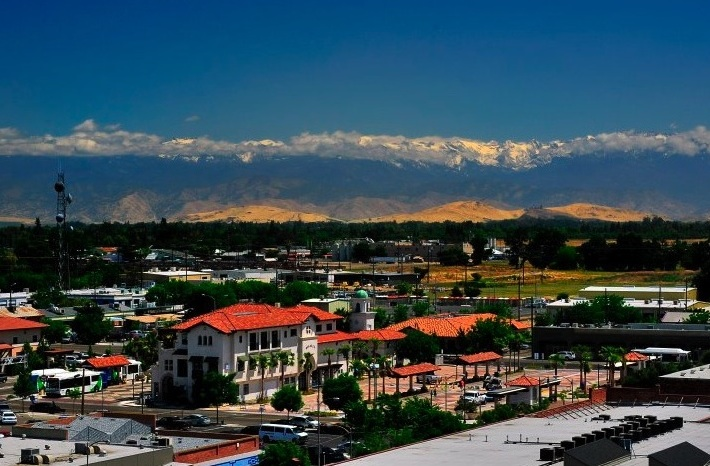
15 – Visalia

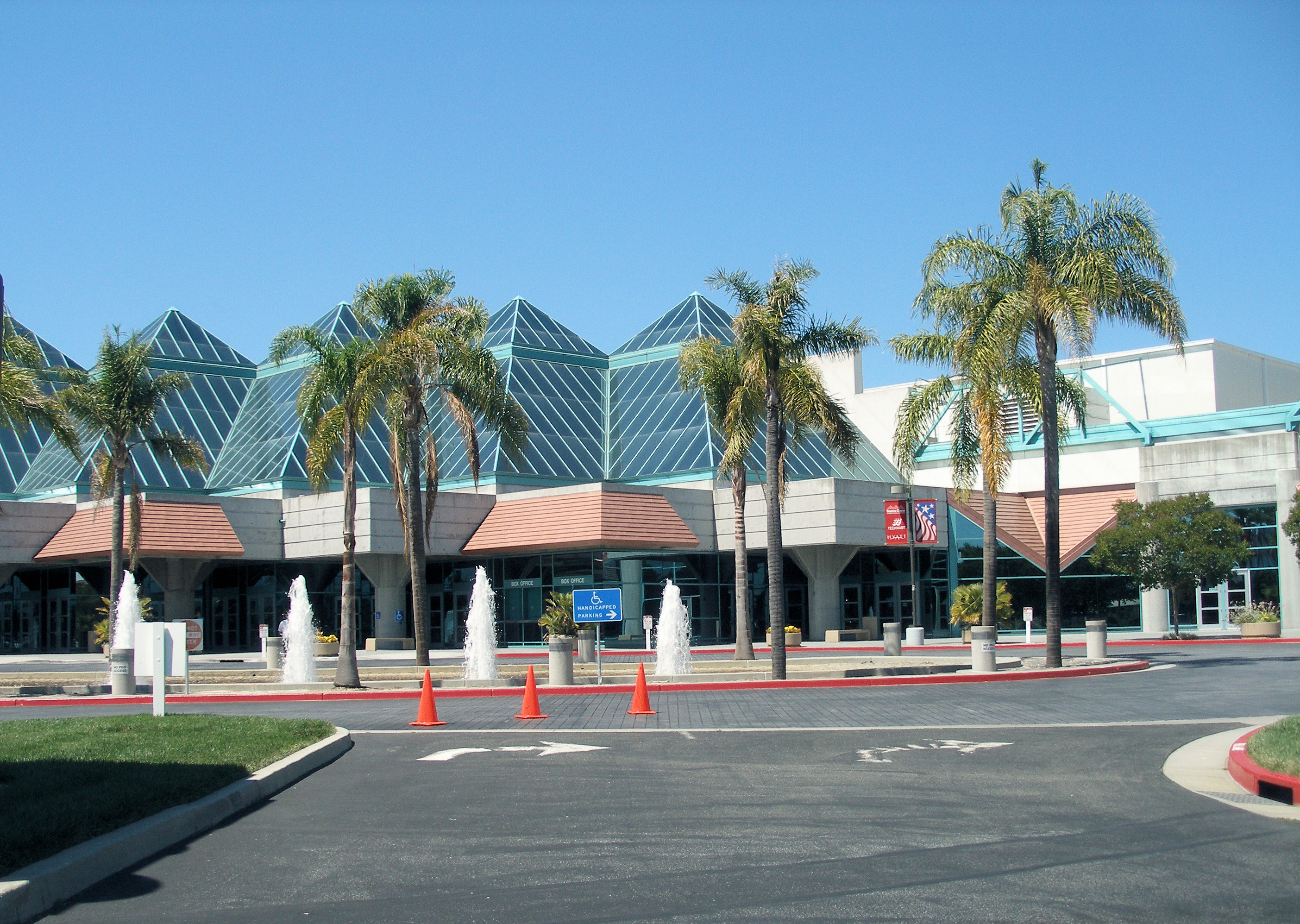
16 – Santa Clara

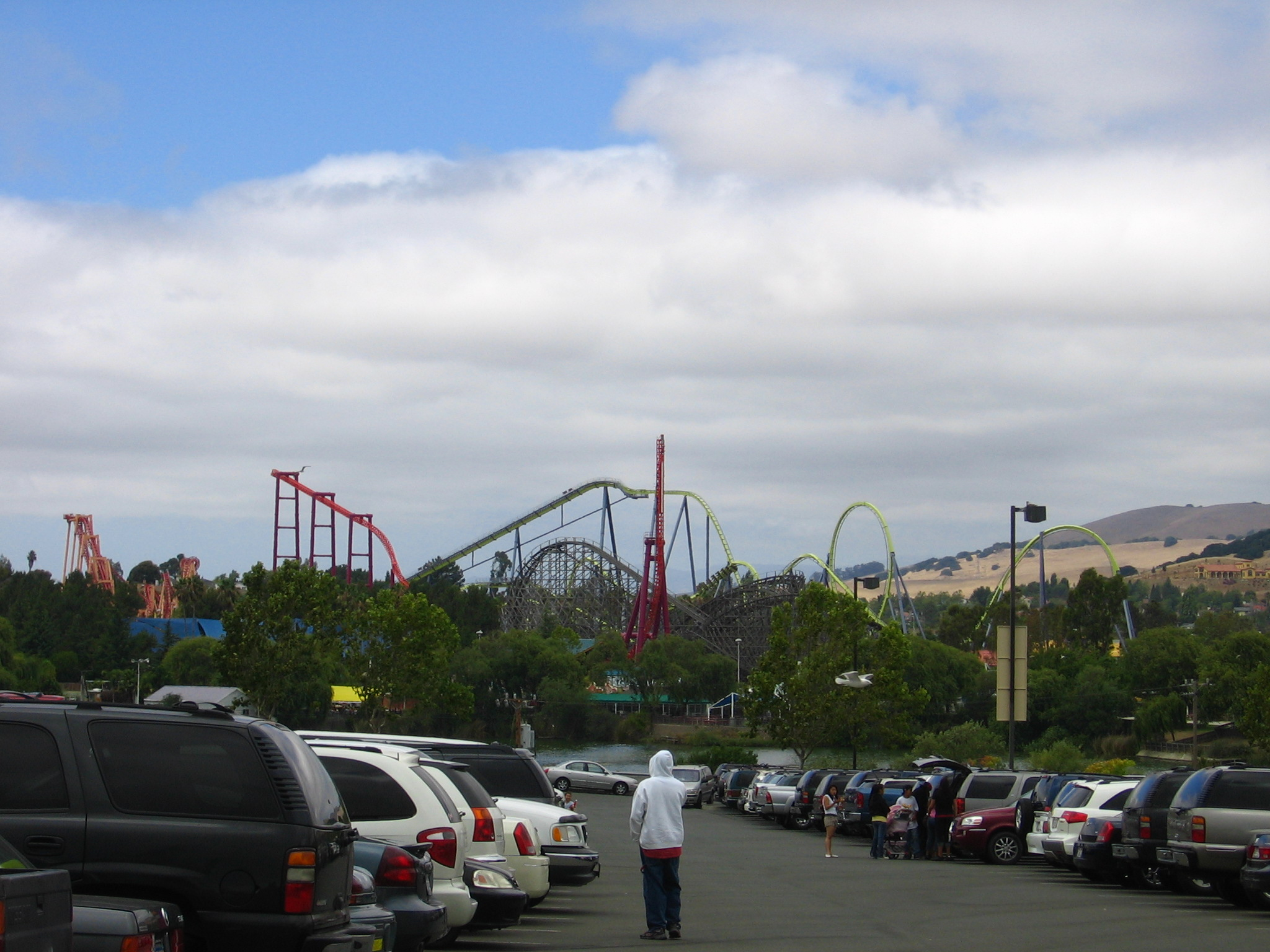
17 – Vallejo

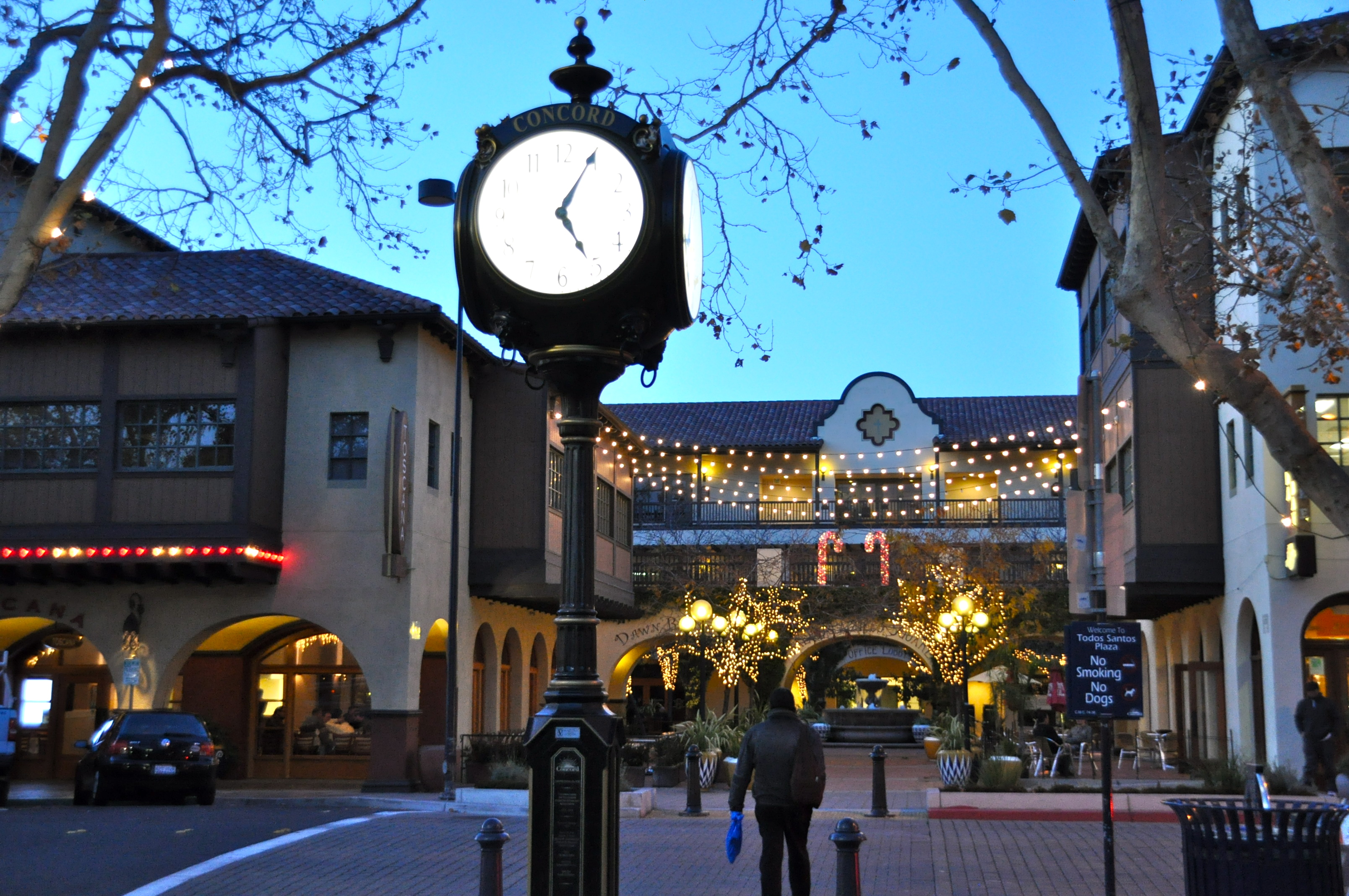
18 – Concord

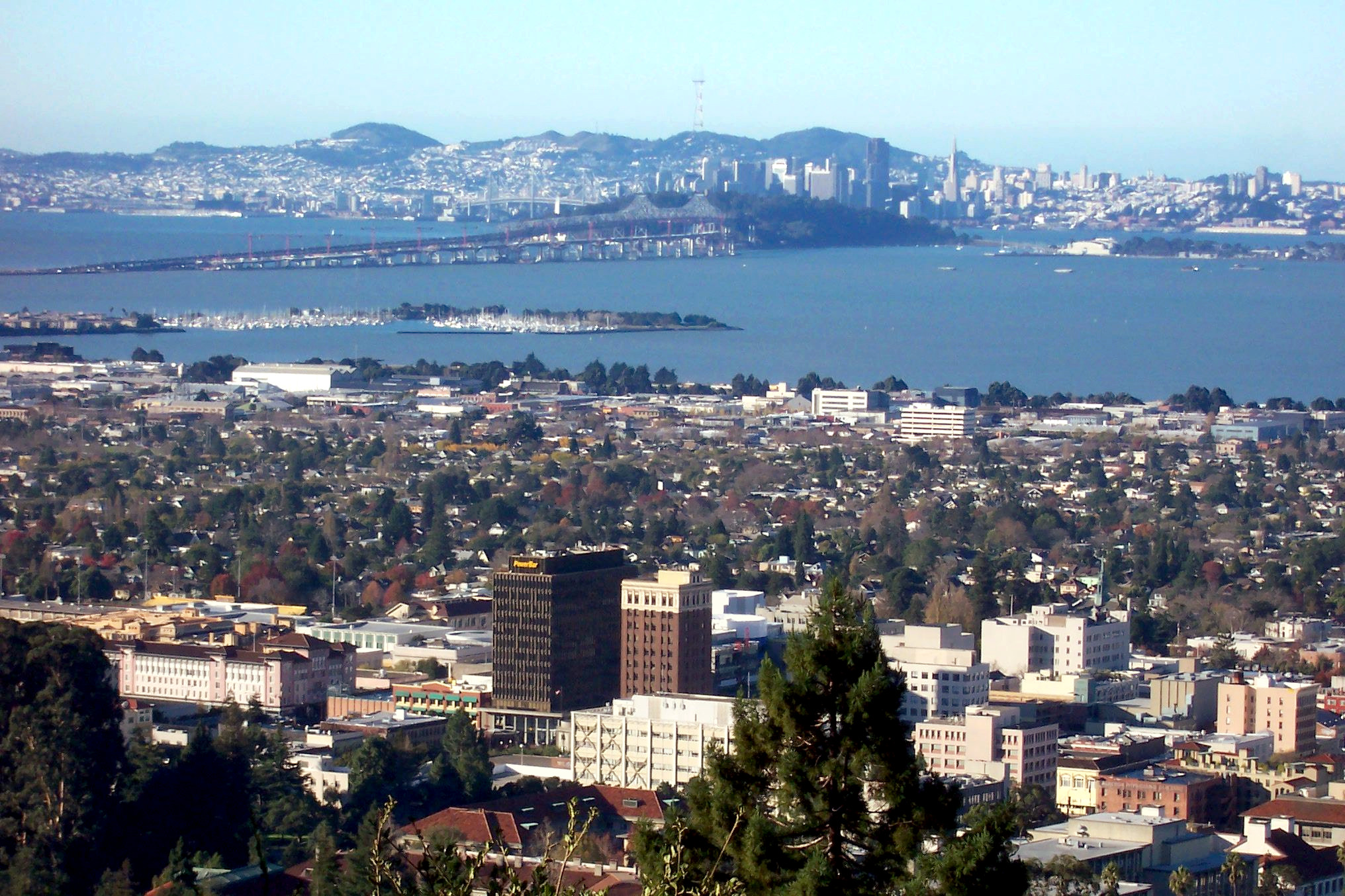
19 – Berkeley

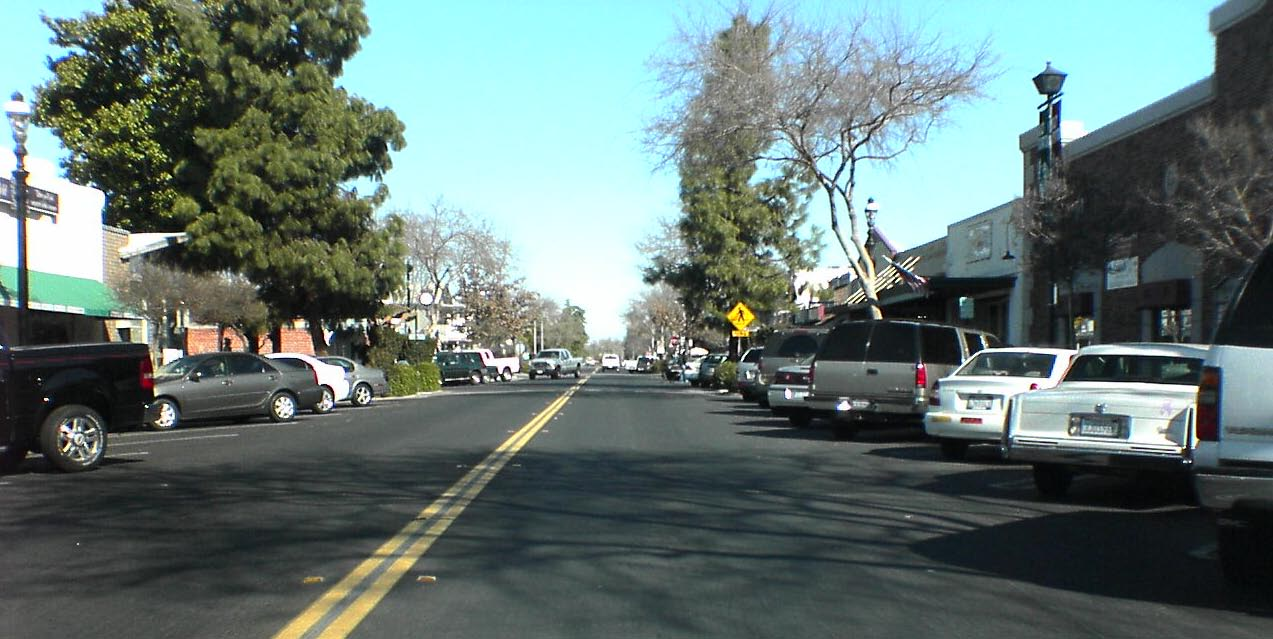
20 – Clovis

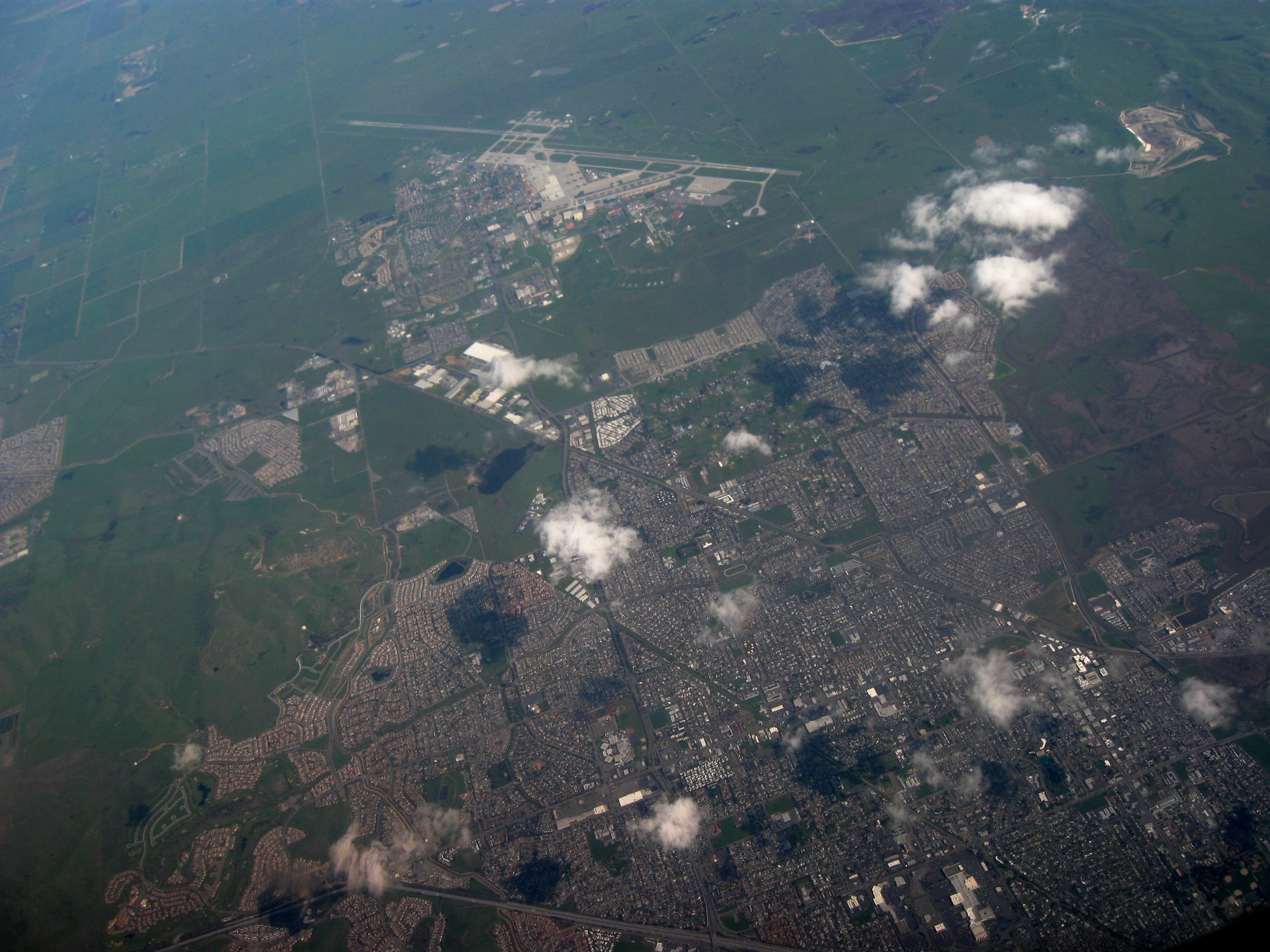
21 – Fairfield

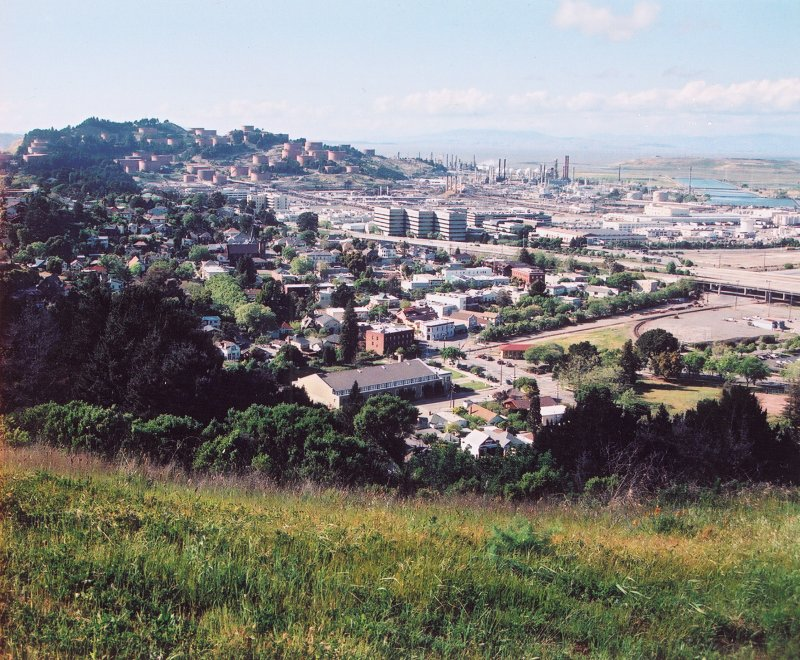
22 – Richmond

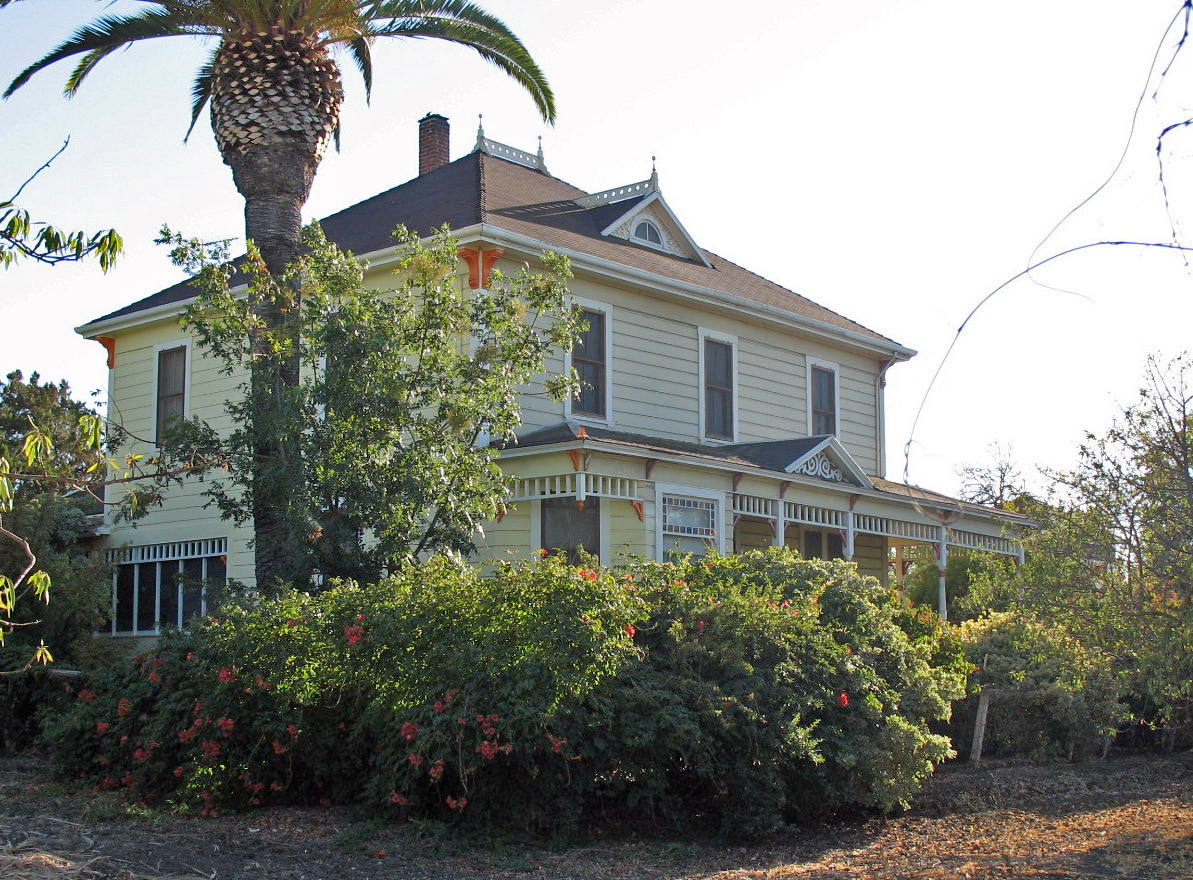
23 – Antioch

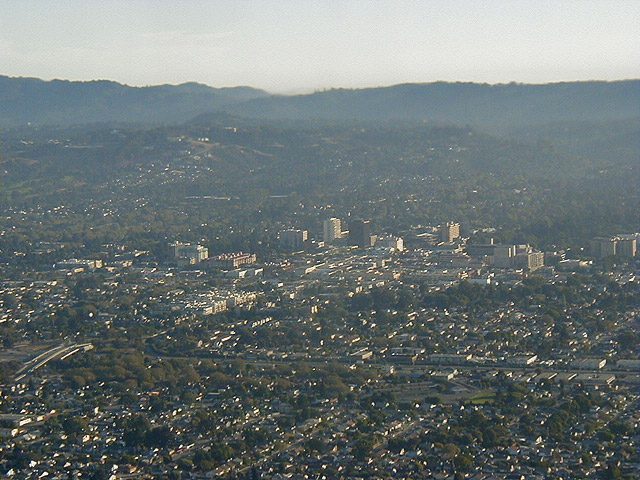
24 – San Mateo

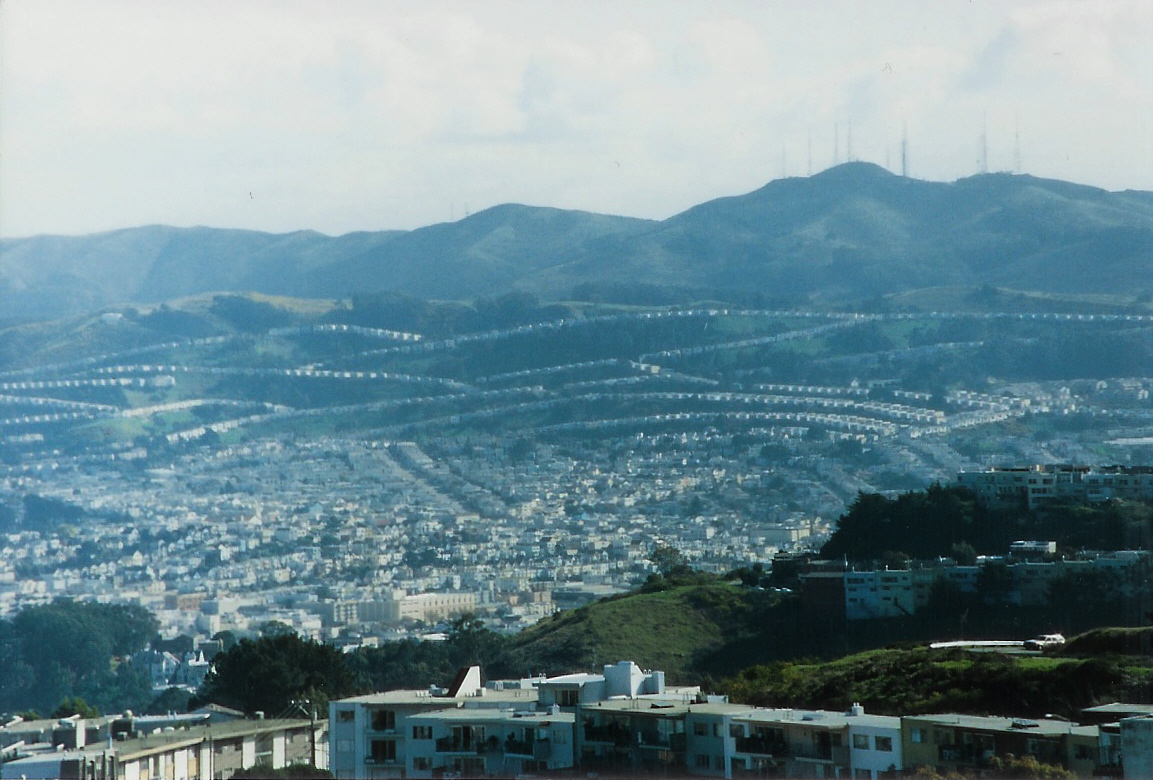
25 – Daly City

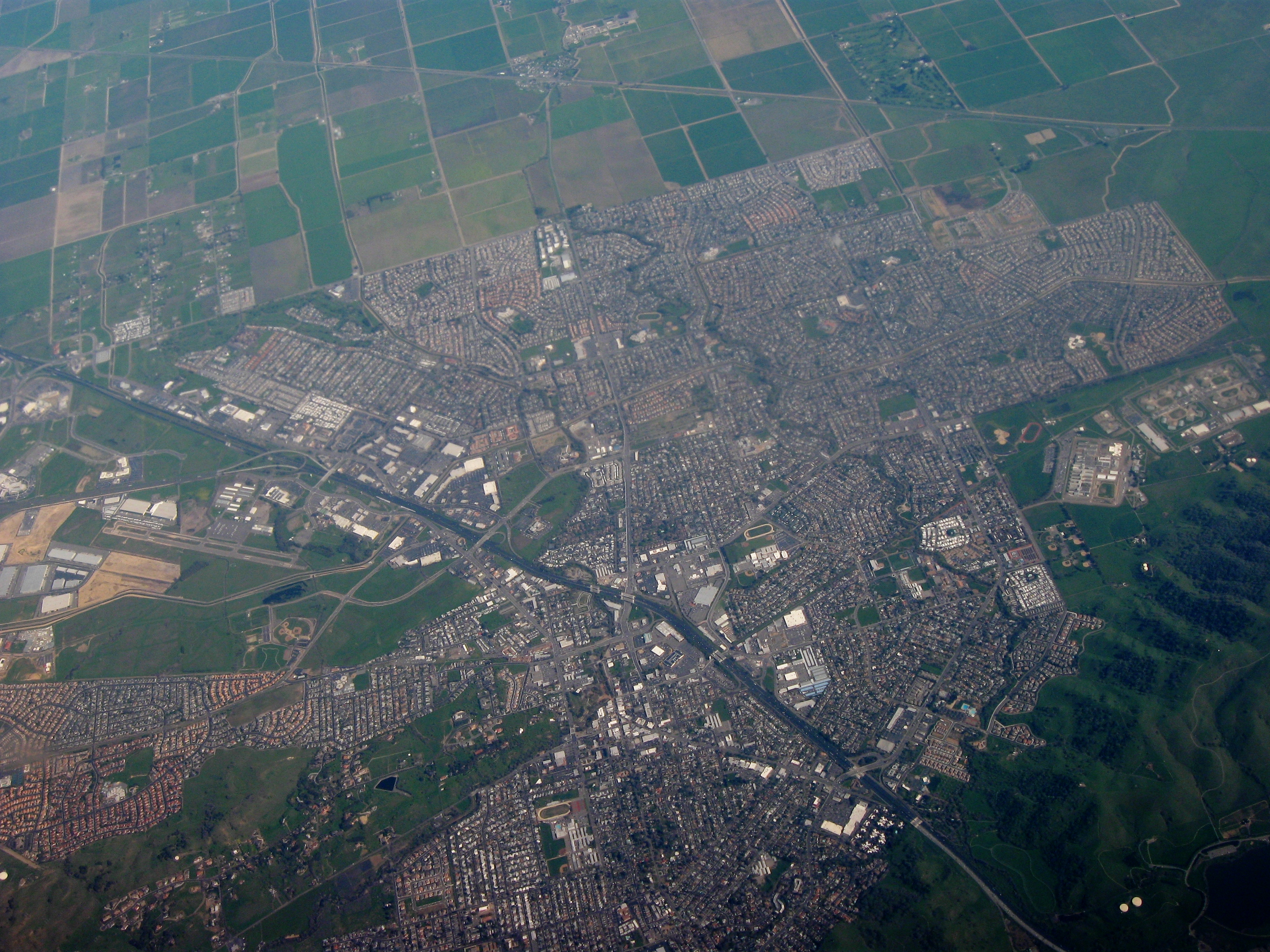
26 – Vacaville

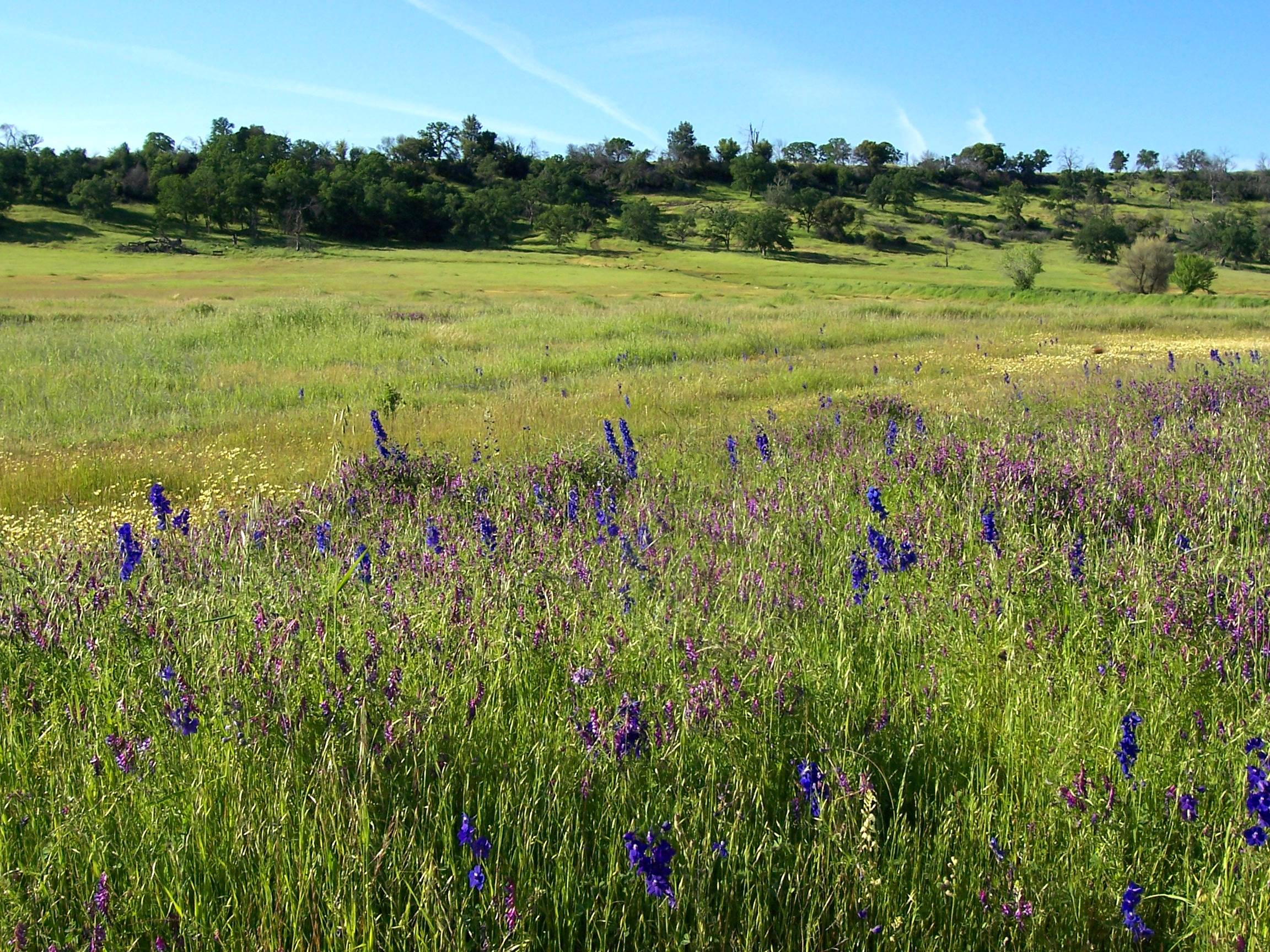
27 – Chico

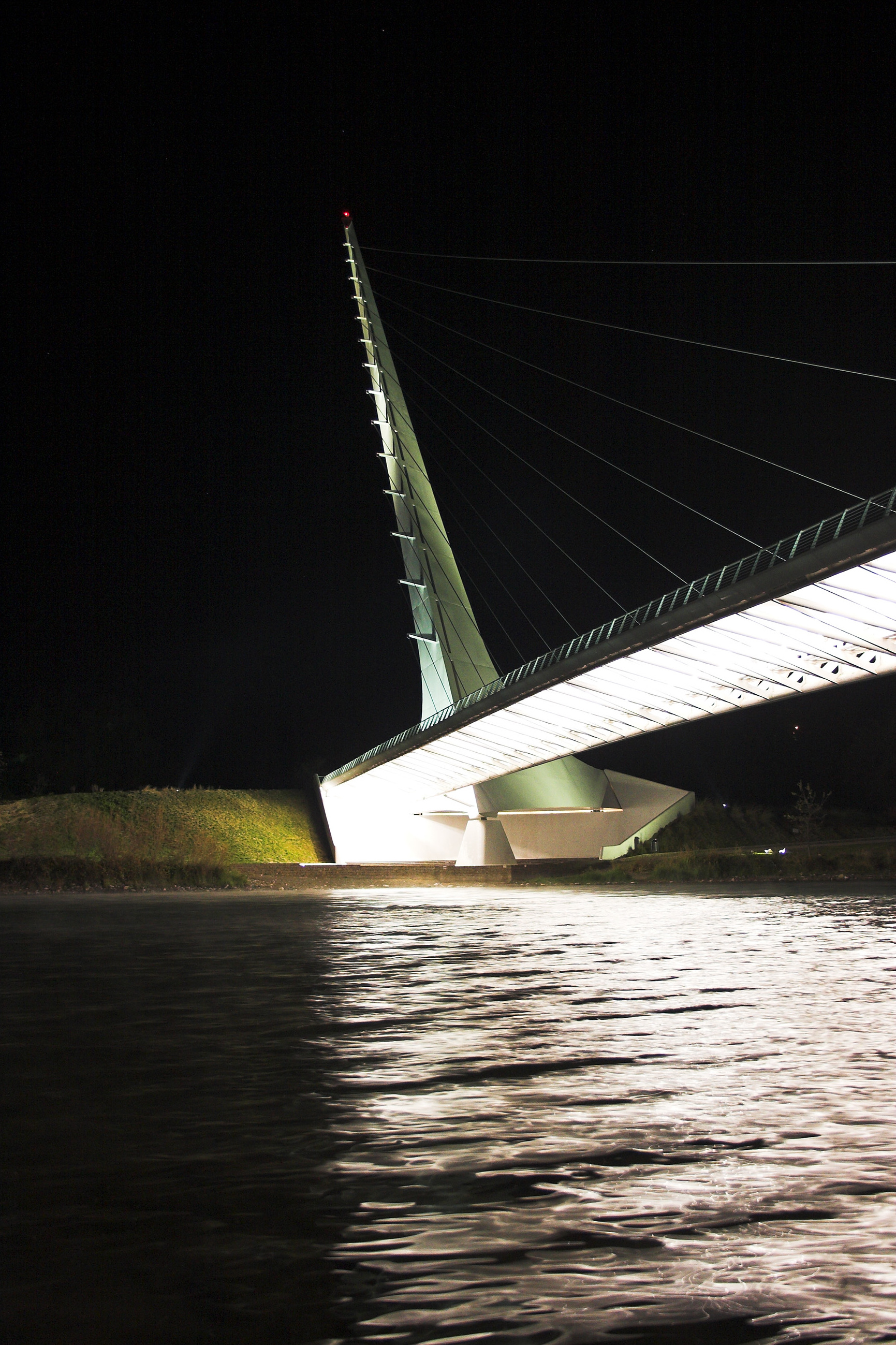
28 – Redding

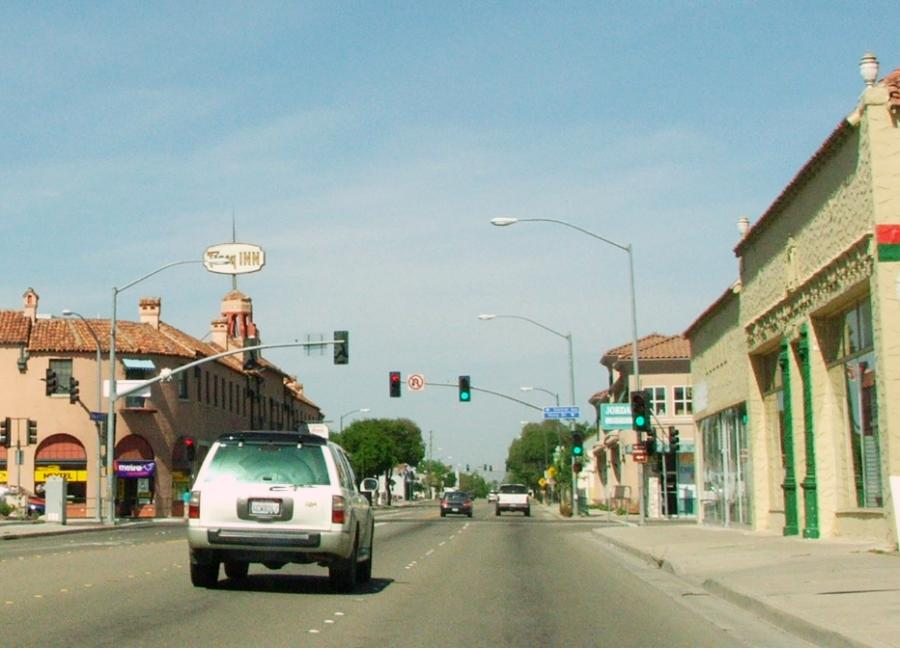
29 – Tracy

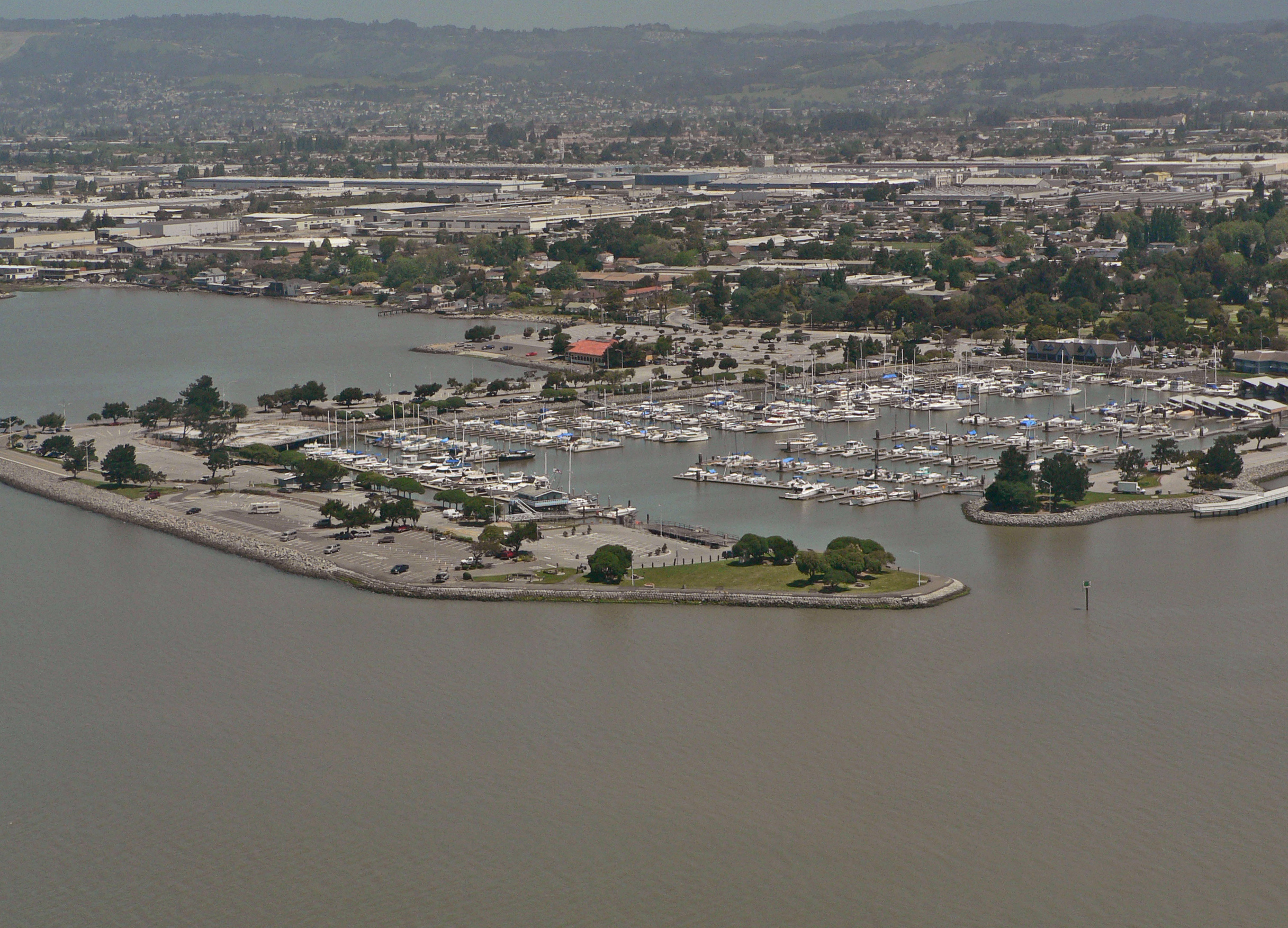
30 – San Leandro

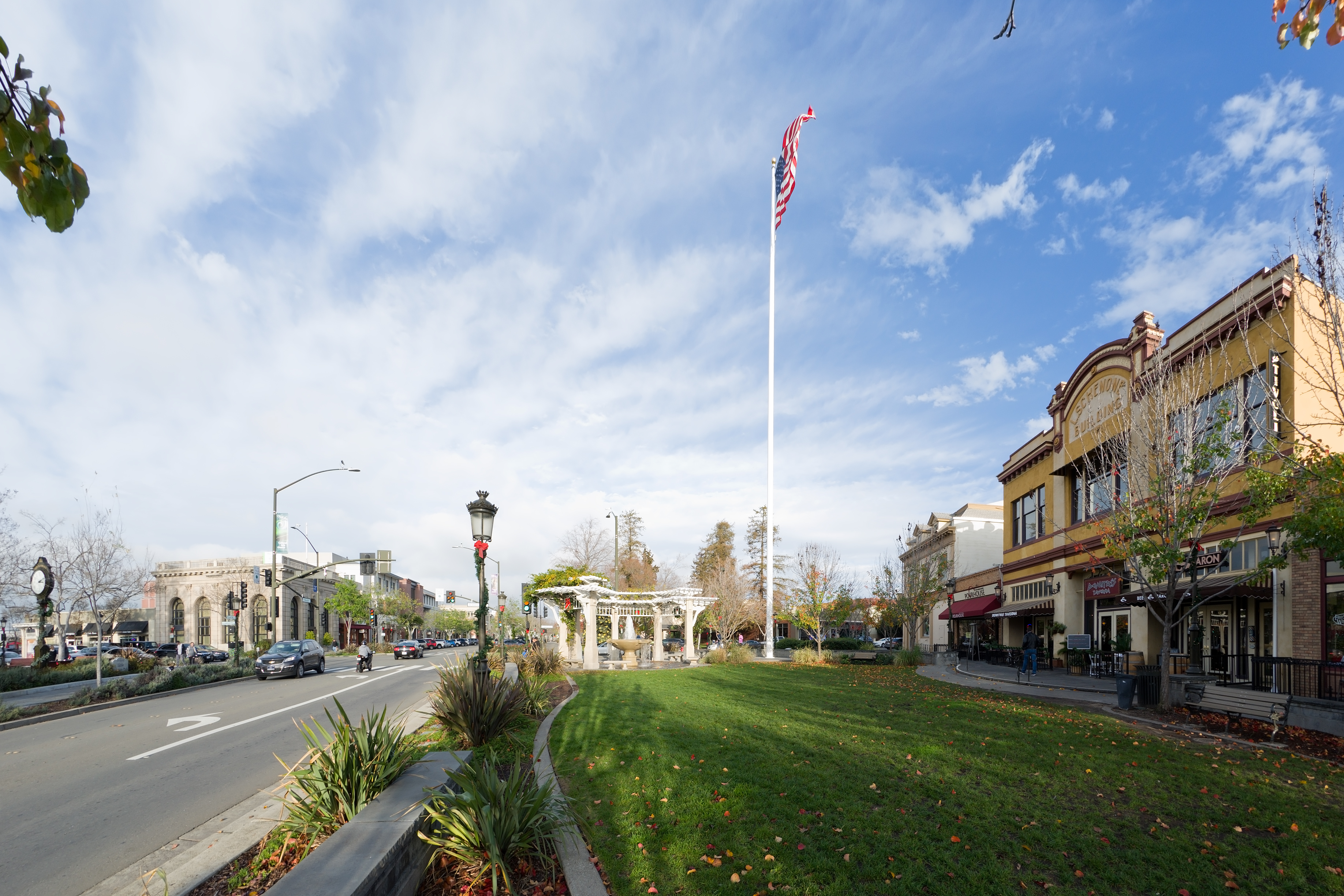
31 - Livermore

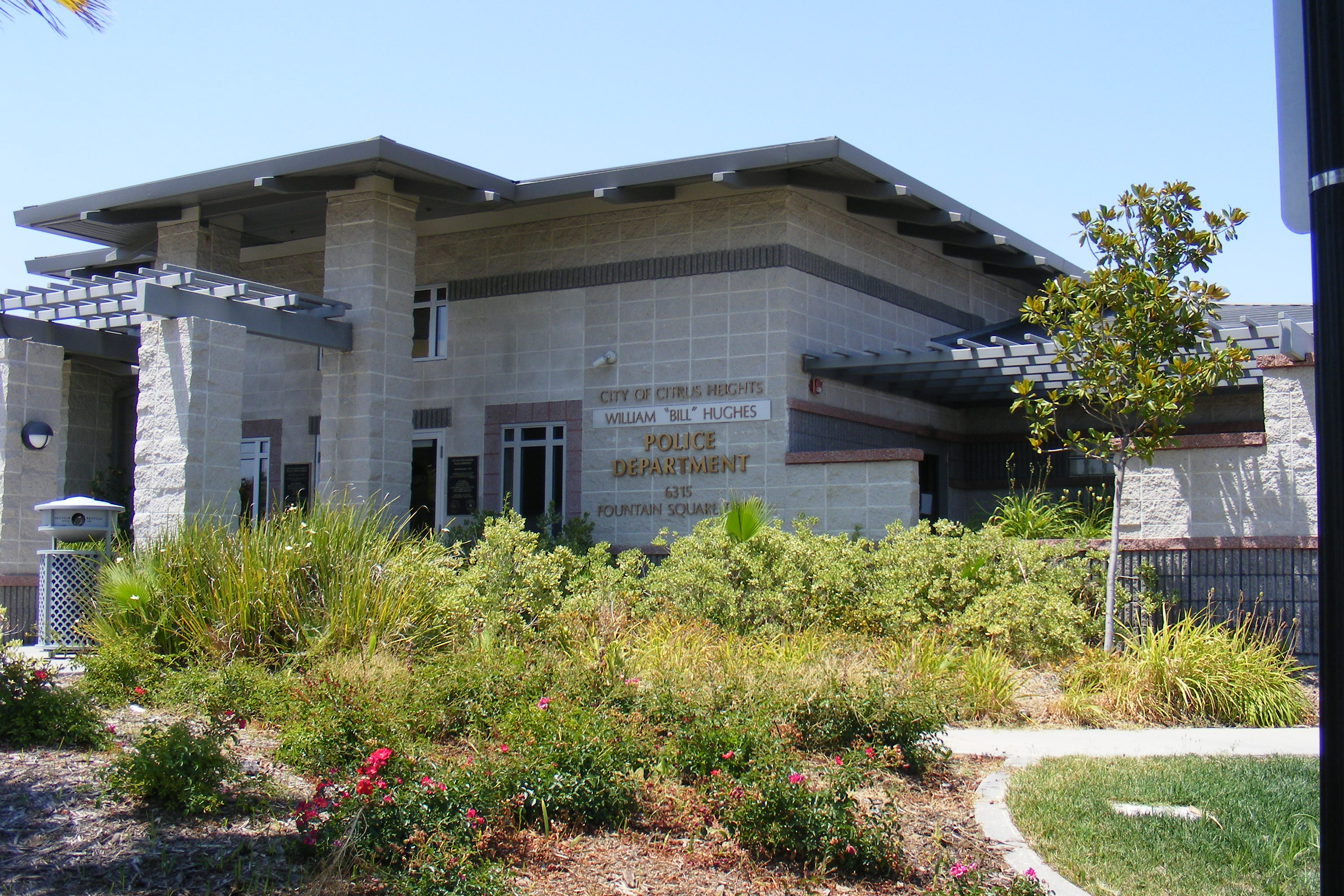
32 – Citrus Heights

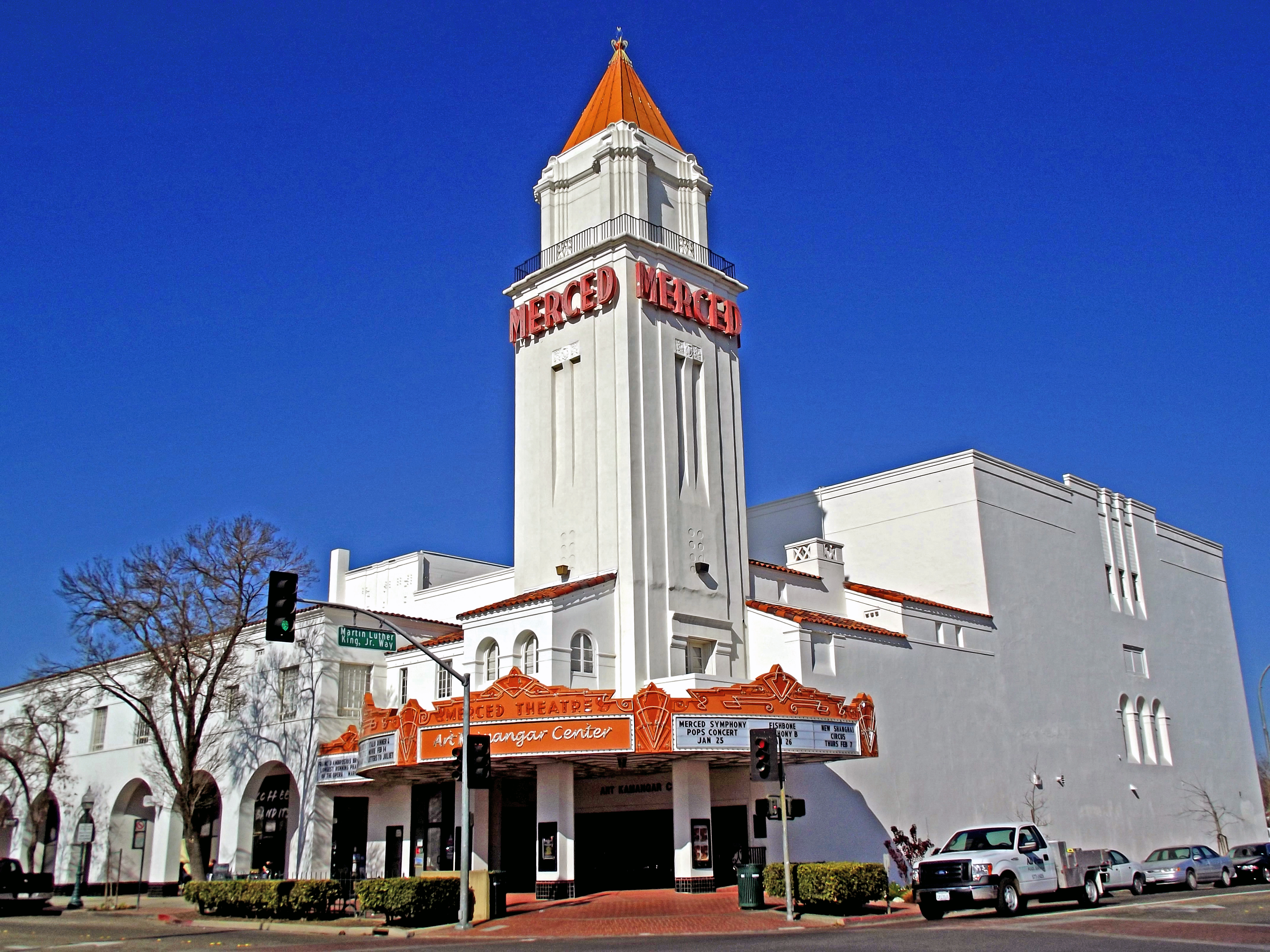
33 – Merced

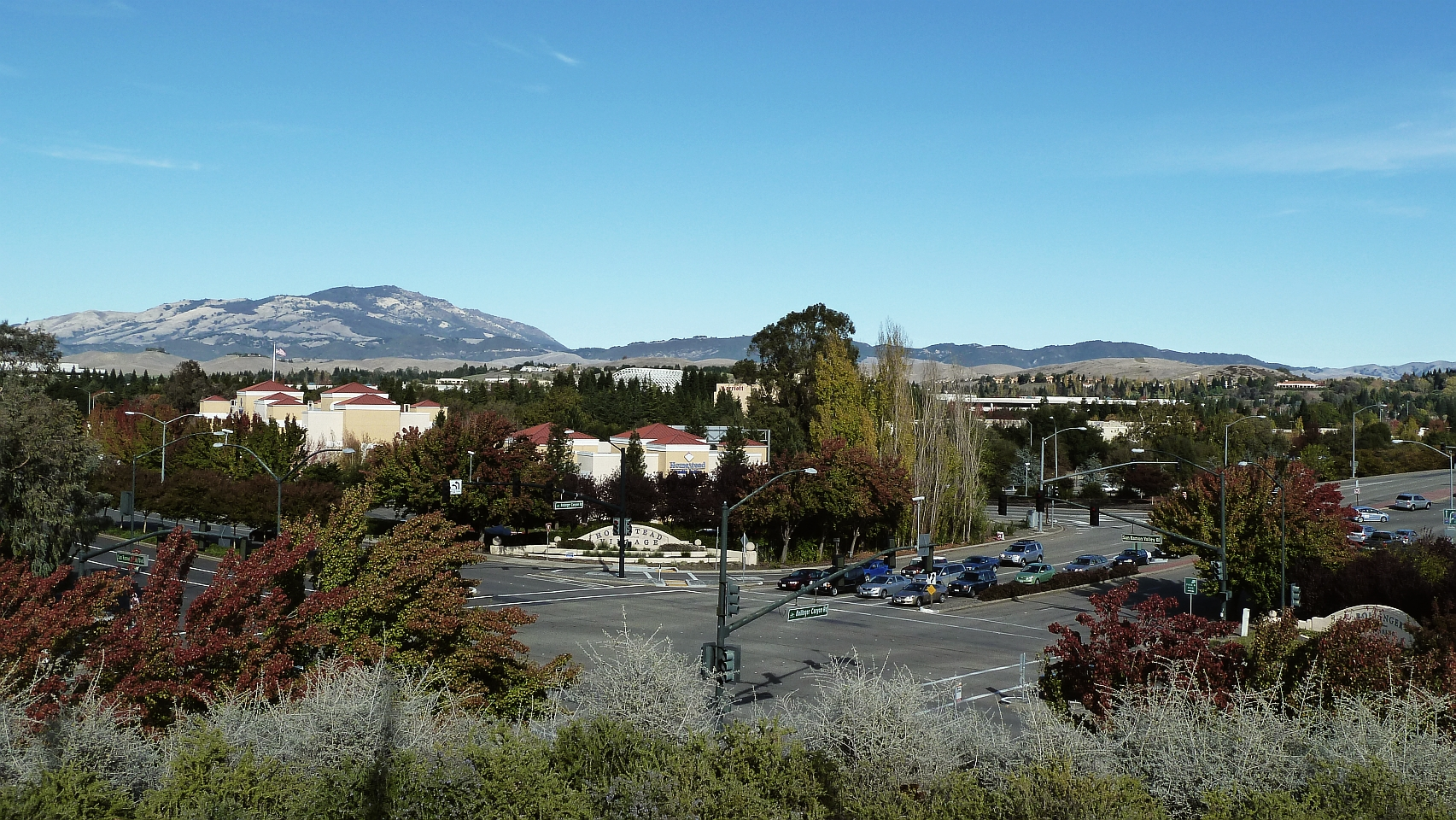
34 – San Ramon

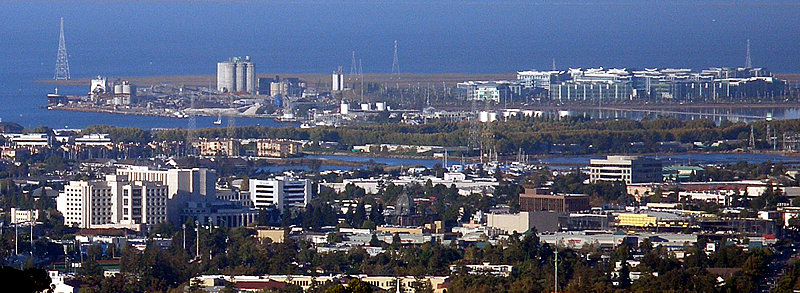
35 – Redwood City

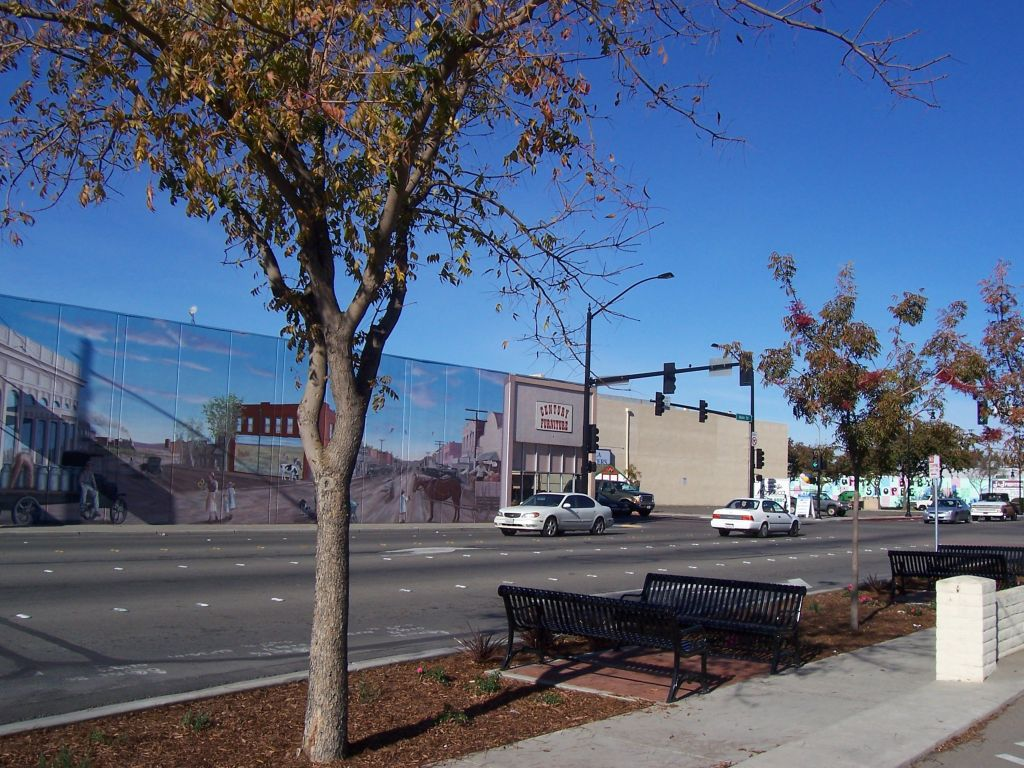
36 – Manteca

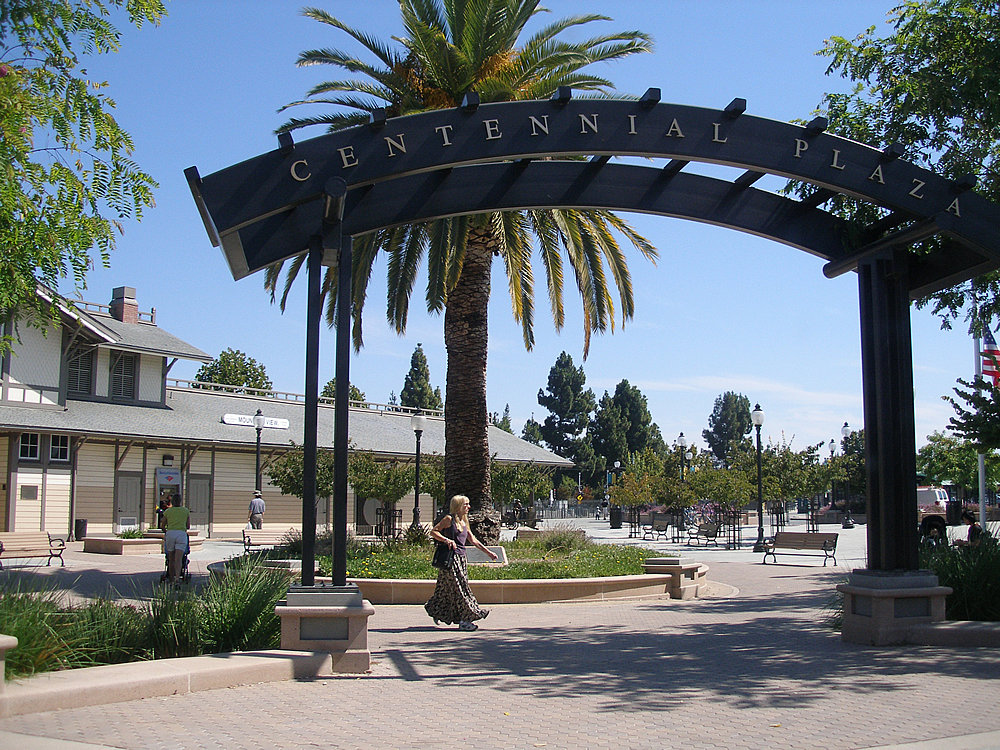
37 – Mountain View

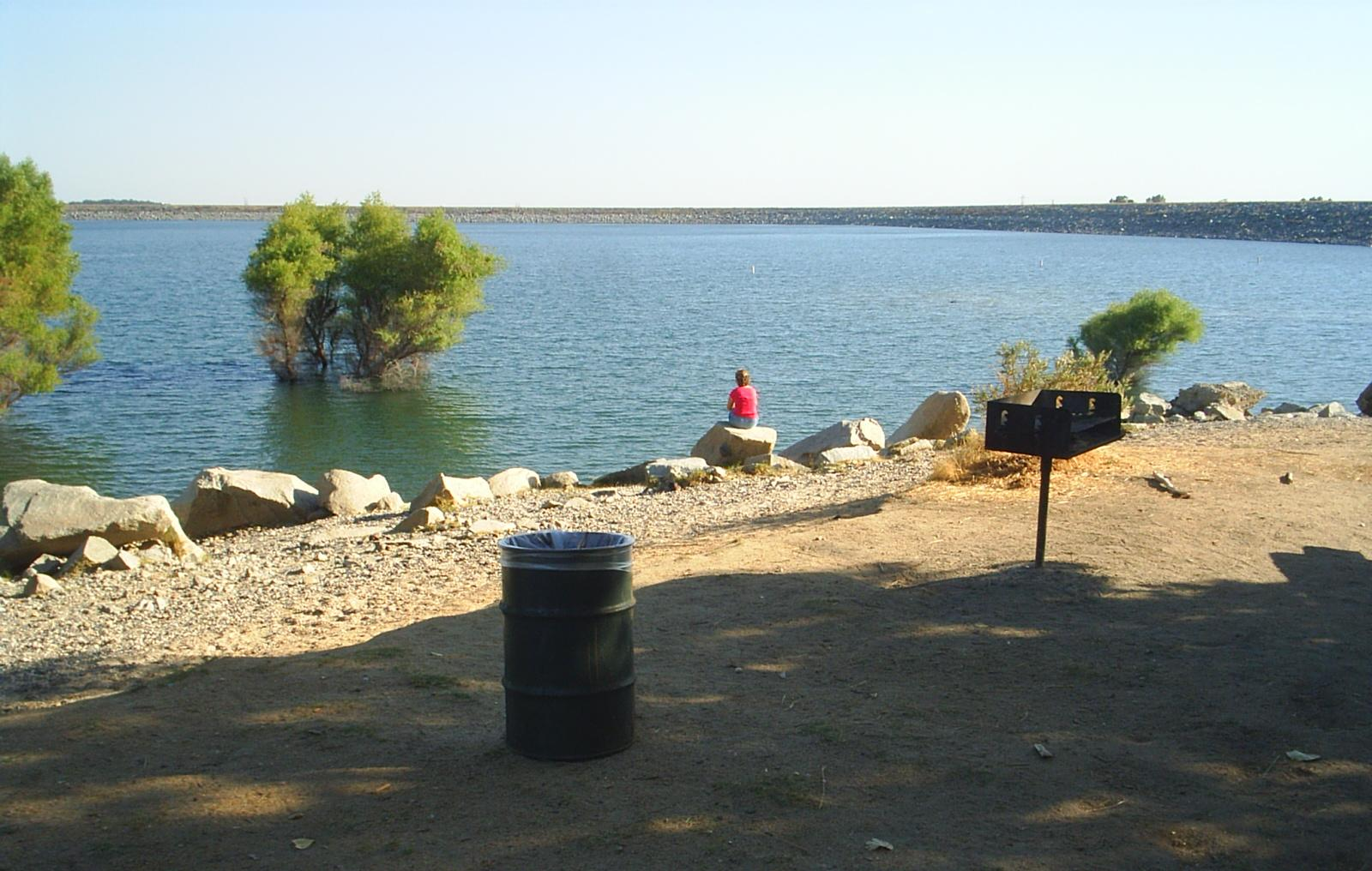
38 – Folsom

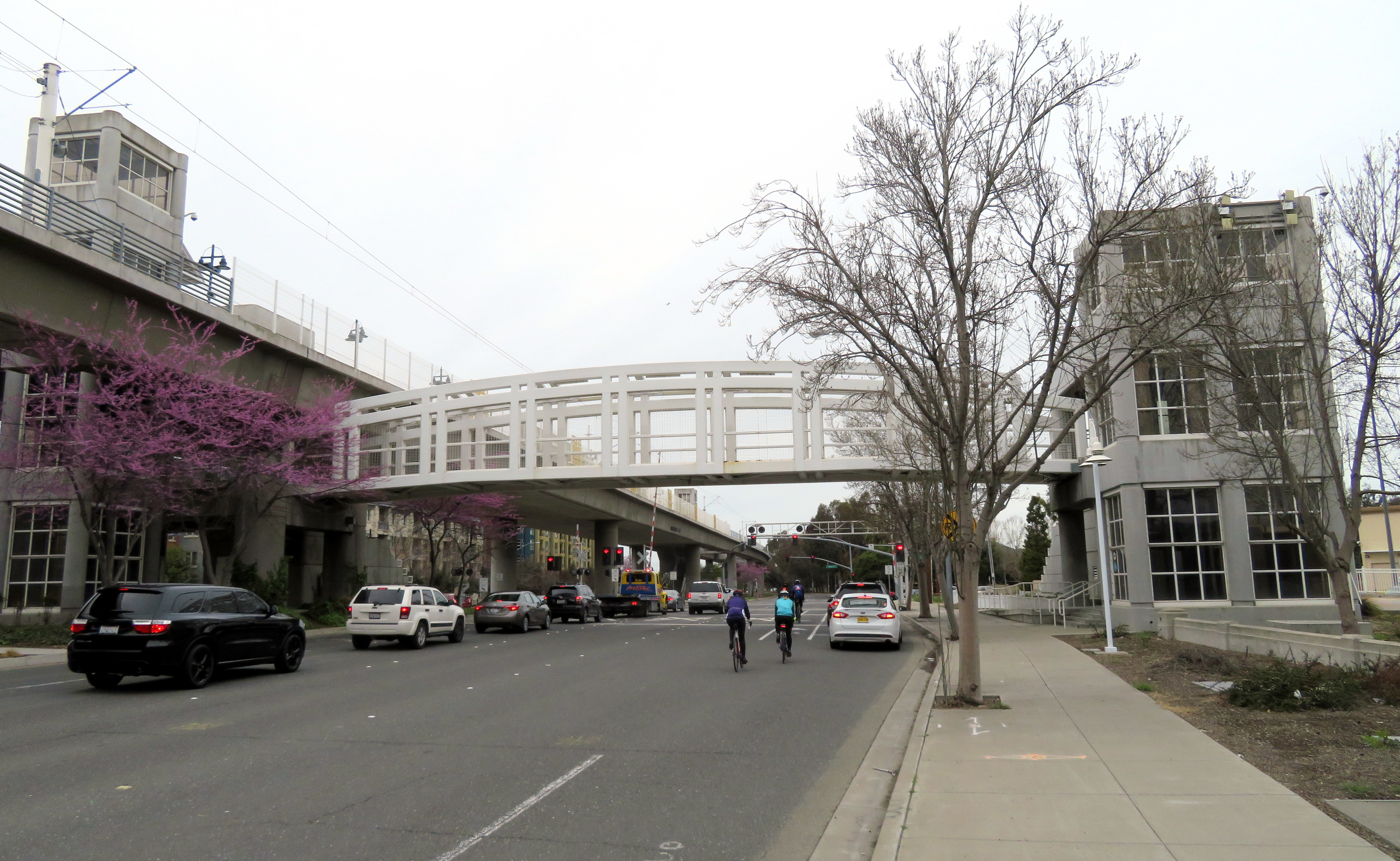
39 – Milpitas

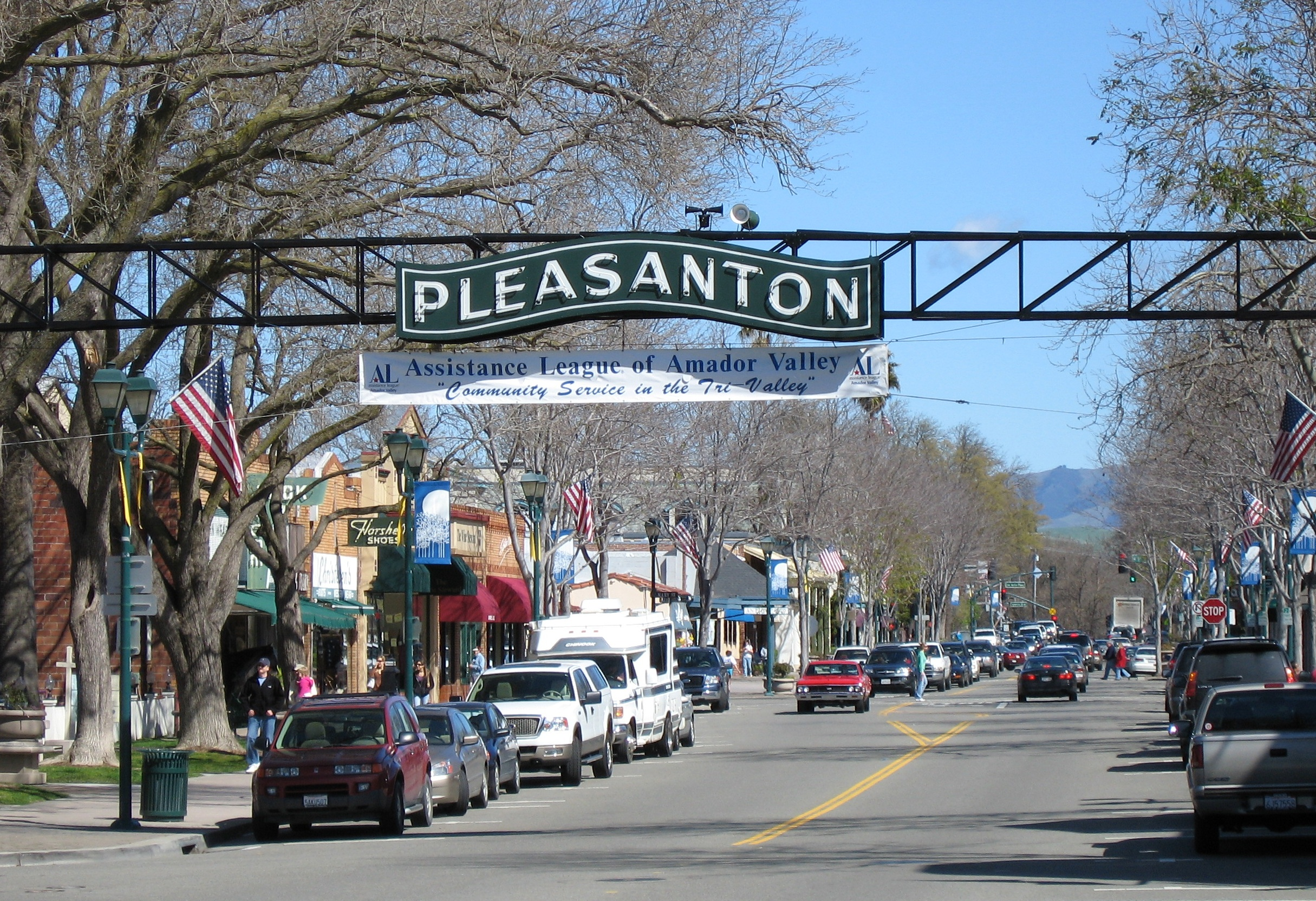
40 – Pleasanton

City	Population (2020)
Alameda	78,280
Antioch	115,291
Berkeley	124,321
Brentwood	64,292
Chico	101,475
Citrus Heights	87,583
Clovis	120,124
Concord	125,410
Cupertino	60,381
Daly City	104,901
Davis	66,850
Dublin	72,589
Elk Grove	176,124
Fairfield	119,881
Folsom	80,454
Fresno	542,107
Fremont	230,504
Gilroy	59,520
Hanford	57,990
Hayward	162,954
Livermore	87,955
Lodi	66,348
Madera	66,224
Manteca	83,498
Merced	86,333
Milpitas	80,273
Modesto	218,464
Mountain View	82,376
Napa	79,246
Novato	53,225
Oakland	440,646
Palo Alto	68,572
Petaluma	59,776
Pittsburg	76,416
Pleasanton	79,871
Porterville	62,623
Rancho Cordova	79,332
Redding	93,611
Redwood City	84,292
Richmond	116,448
Rocklin	71,601
Roseville	147,773
Sacramento	524,943
Salinas	163,542
San Francisco	873,965
San Jose	1,013,240
San Leandro	91,008
San Mateo	105,661
San Rafael	61,271
San Ramon	84,605
Santa Clara	127,647
Santa Cruz	62,956
Santa Rosa	178,127
South San Francisco	66,105
Stockton	320,804
Sunnyvale	155,805
Tracy	93,000
Tulare	68,875
Turlock	72,740
Union City	70,143
Vacaville	102,386
Vallejo	126,090
Visalia	141,384
Walnut Creek	70,127
Watsonville	52,590
West Sacramento	53,915
Woodland	61,032
Yuba City	70,117

=== Metropolitan areas ===
Northern California is home to three of the state's four combined statistical areas (CSAs): the San Francisco Bay Area, Greater Sacramento, and Metropolitan Fresno. Three-fourths of Northern Californians live in these CSAs as of the 2010 United States census. The constituent metropolitan statistical areas of these CSAs are listed below:

List of metropolitan statistical areas in Northern California
Metropolitan statistical area	Population (2018)	GDP (2022)
San Francisco–Oakland–Berkeley, CA MSA	4,729,484	$729.105 billion
San Jose-Sunnyvale-Santa Clara, CA MSA	1,999,107	$403.513 billion
Sacramento-Roseville-Folsom, CA MSA	2,345,210	$176.276 billion
Stockton, CA MSA	752,660	$40.228 billion
Santa Rosa-Petaluma, CA MSA	499,942	$36.877 billion
Vallejo, CA MSA	446,610	$35.408 billion
Salinas, CA MSA	435,594	$33.249 billion
Modesto, CA MSA	549,815	$28.674 billion
Santa Cruz-Watsonville, CA MSA	274,255	$19.176 billion
Napa, CA MSA	139,417	$13.166 billion
Merced, CA MSA	274,765	$11.560 billion
Yuba City, CA MSA	174,848	$8.608 billion
Total	12,621,707	$1,535.840 billion

=== Major business districts ===
The following are major central business districts:

- San Francisco Financial District
- Downtown Oakland
- Downtown Sacramento
- Downtown San Jose

== Transportation ==
See also articles:

- Transportation in the Sacramento metropolitan area
- Transportation in the San Francisco Bay Area

See also categories:

- Transportation in Alameda County
- Transportation in Alpine County
- Transportation in Amador County
- Transportation in Butte County
- Transportation in Calaveras County
- Transportation in Colusa County
- Transportation in Contra Costa County
- Transportation in Del Norte County
- Transportation in El Dorado County
- Transportation in Fresno County
- Transportation in Glenn County
- Transportation in Humboldt County
- Transportation in Inyo County
- Transportation in Kings County
- Transportation in Lake County
- Transportation in Lassen County
- Transportation in Madera County
- Transportation in Marin County
- Transportation in Mariposa County
- Transportation in Mendocino County
- Transportation in Merced County
- Transportation in Modoc County
- Transportation in Mono County
- Transportation in Monterey County
- Transportation in Napa County
- Transportation in Nevada County
- Transportation in Oakland
- Transportation in Placer County
- Transportation in Plumas County
- Transportation in Sacramento
- Transportation in Sacramento County
- Transportation in San Benito County
- Transportation in the San Francisco Bay Area
- Transportation in San Francisco
- Transportation in San Joaquin County
- Transportation in San Mateo County
- Transportation in Santa Clara County
- Transportation in Santa Cruz County
- Transportation in Shasta County
- Transportation in Sierra County
- Transportation in Siskiyou County
- Transportation in Solano County
- Transportation in Sonoma County
- Transportation in Stanislaus County
- Transportation in Sutter County
- Transportation in Tehama County
- Transportation in Trinity County
- Transportation in Tulare County
- Transportation in Tuolumne County
- Transportation in Yolo County
- Transportation in Yuba County

=== Airports ===
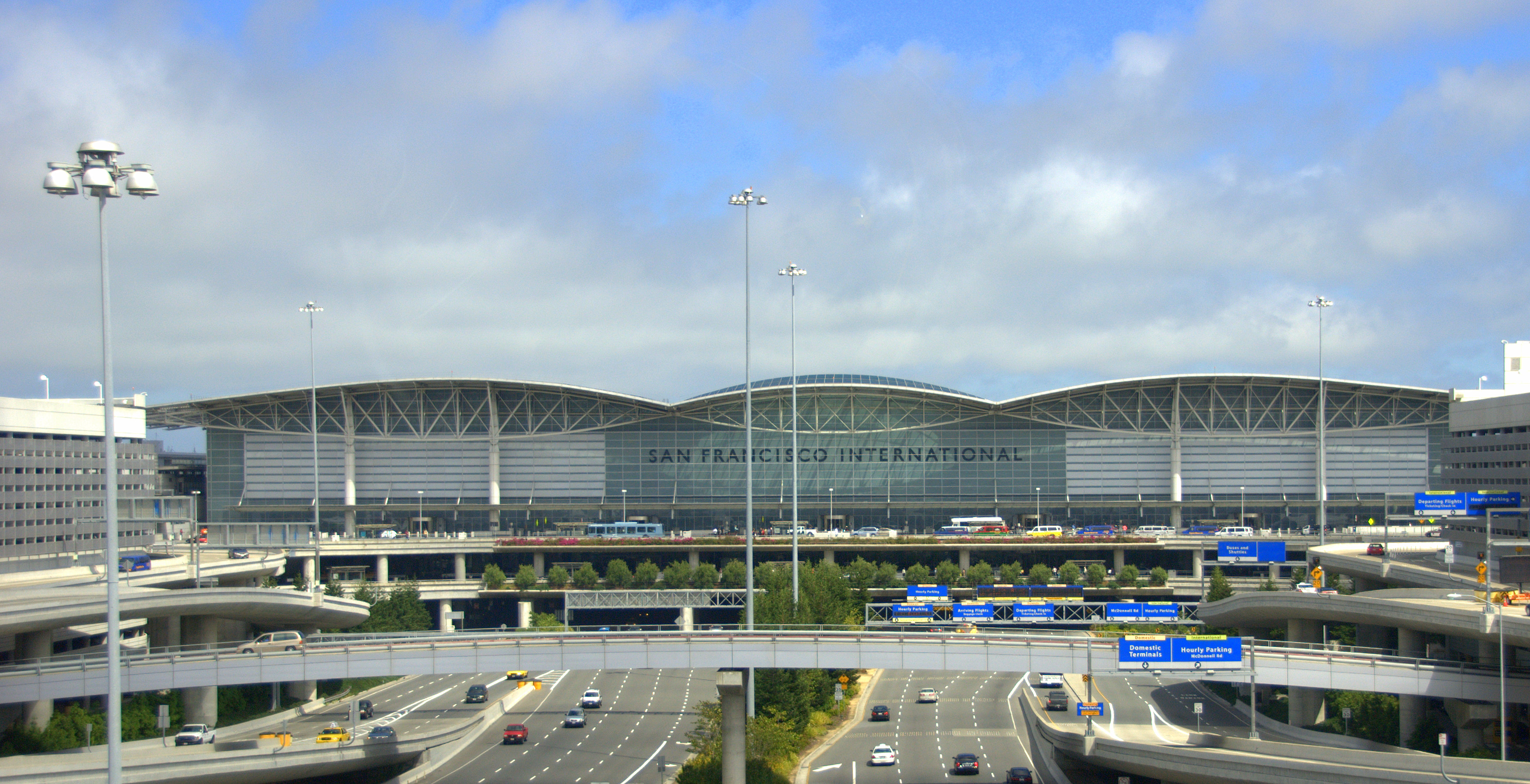
San Francisco International Airport (SFO) is the largest and busiest airport in northern California, also ranking second in the state and tenth in the United States.

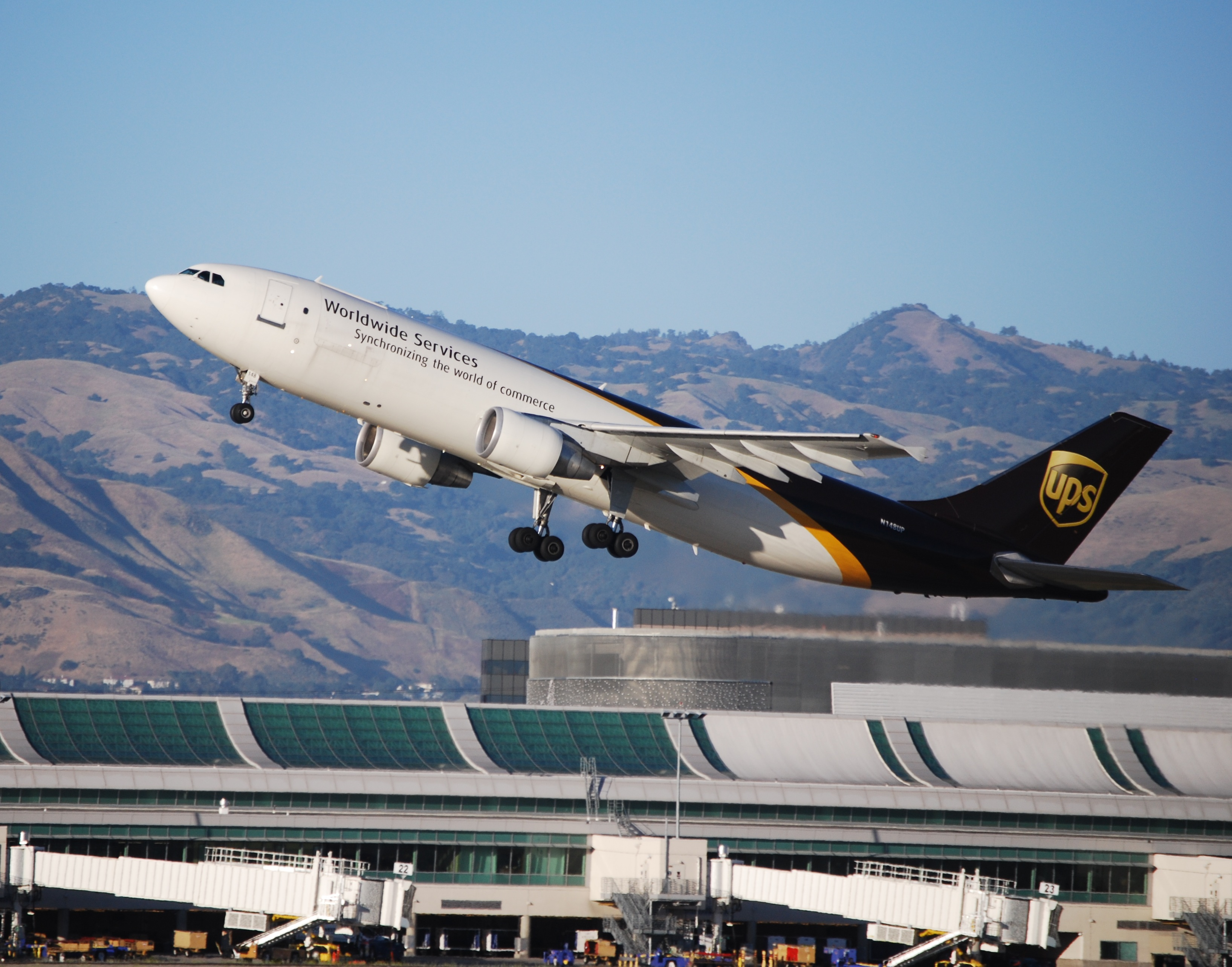
San Jose International Airport is ranked as the best-run airport in the United States, by the ACBJ.

There are 11 airports in Northern California categorized as Primary Service Commercial airports by the FAA:

Airport	ID	City	Category	2018 Enplanements
San Francisco International Airport	SFO	San Francisco	Large Hub	27,794,154
San Jose International Airport	SJC	San Jose	Medium Hub	7,037,144
Oakland San Francisco Bay Airport	OAK	Oakland	Medium Hub	6,687,963
Sacramento International Airport	SMF	Sacramento	Medium Hub	5,907,901
Fresno Yosemite International Airport	FAT	Fresno	Small Hub	853,538
Charles M. Schulz–Sonoma County Airport	STS	Santa Rosa	Non Hub	217,994
Monterey Regional Airport	MRY	Monterey	Non Hub	188,046
Stockton Metropolitan Airport	SCK	Stockton	Non Hub	99,258
Arcata-Eureka Airport	ACV	Arcata	Non Hub	69,604
Redding Municipal Airport	RDD	Redding	Non Hub	42,775
Mammoth Yosemite Airport	MMH	Mammoth Lakes	Non Hub	23,522

=== Railroad ===
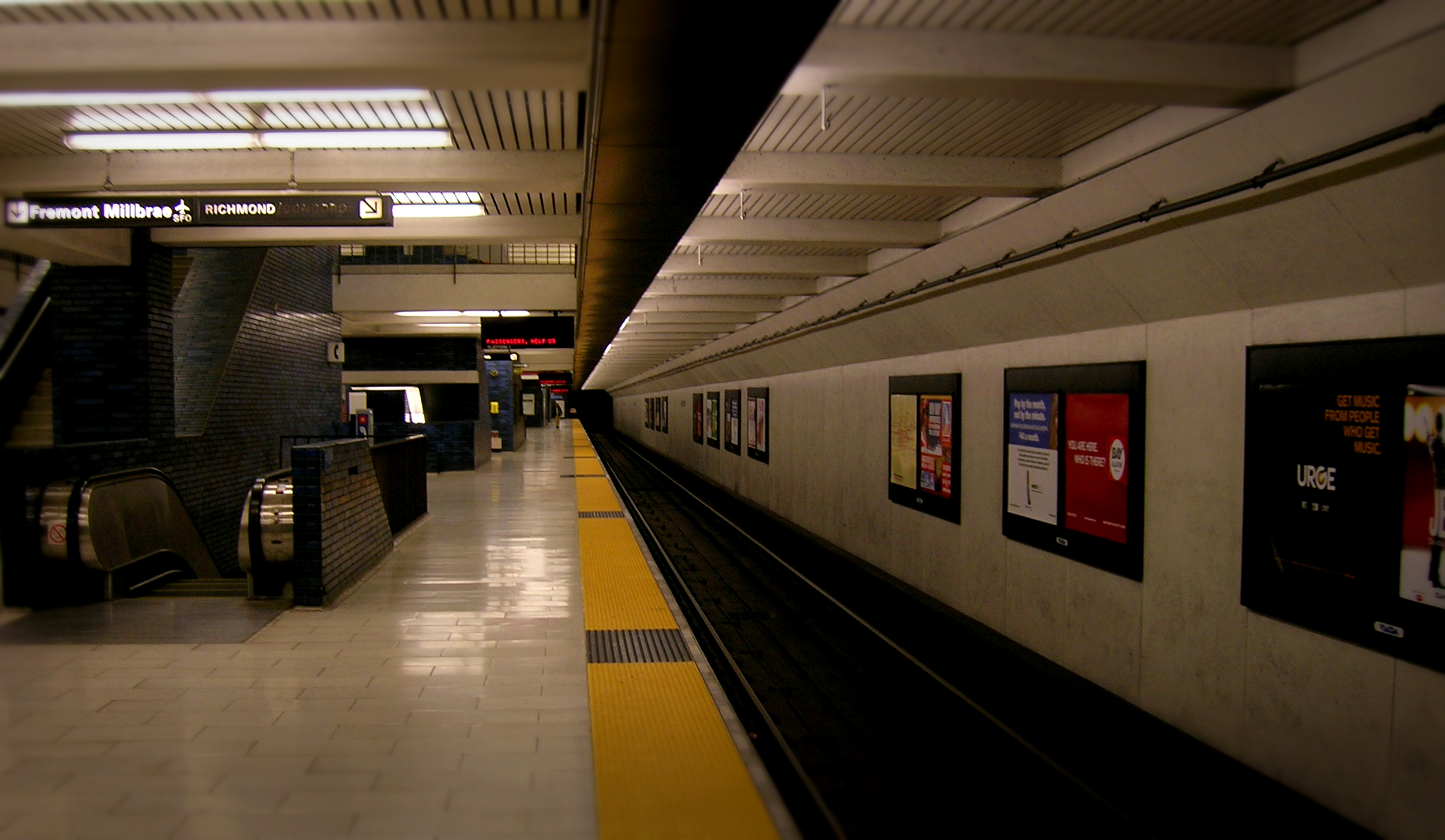
The 19th Street Oakland BART station in downtown Oakland

- Bay Area Rapid Transit (BART) – commuter subway connecting most of the core Bay Area including San Francisco, Oakland, and San Jose
- Caltrain – commuter rail between San Francisco and Gilroy (south of San Jose)
- Muni Metro (San Francisco)
- VTA light rail (San Jose)
- Altamont Corridor Express (ACE) – commuter train connecting Stockton and the Central Valley with San Jose and the Bay Area
- Sacramento Regional Transit District light rail
- Amtrak:
  - California Zephyr – connects Chicago to the Bay Area
  - Capitol Corridor – San Jose to Auburn (eastern suburb of Sacramento)
  - Coast Starlight – coastal train between Los Angeles and Seattle with northern California stops in San Jose, Oakland, and Sacramento
  - Gold Runner – Central Valley train linking Bakersfield in the Central Valley to Sacramento and Oakland

=== Major transit organizations ===
- AC Transit
- Arcata and Mad River Transit System
- County Connection
- El Dorado Transit
- Eureka Transit Service
- Fairfield and Suisun Transit
- Fresno Area Express
- Golden Gate Transit
- Lake Transit
- Mendocino Transit Authority
- Monterey-Salinas Transit
- Porterville City Operated Local Transit
- Redwood Transit System
- SamTrans
- San Benito Express
- SF MUNI
- San Joaquin Regional Transit District
- Santa Clara Valley Transportation Authority (VTA)
- Santa Cruz Metro
- Solano Express
- SolTrans
- Sonoma County Transit
- Tri Delta Transit
- Visalia Transit
- VINE (Napa County)

=== Major transit ferries ===
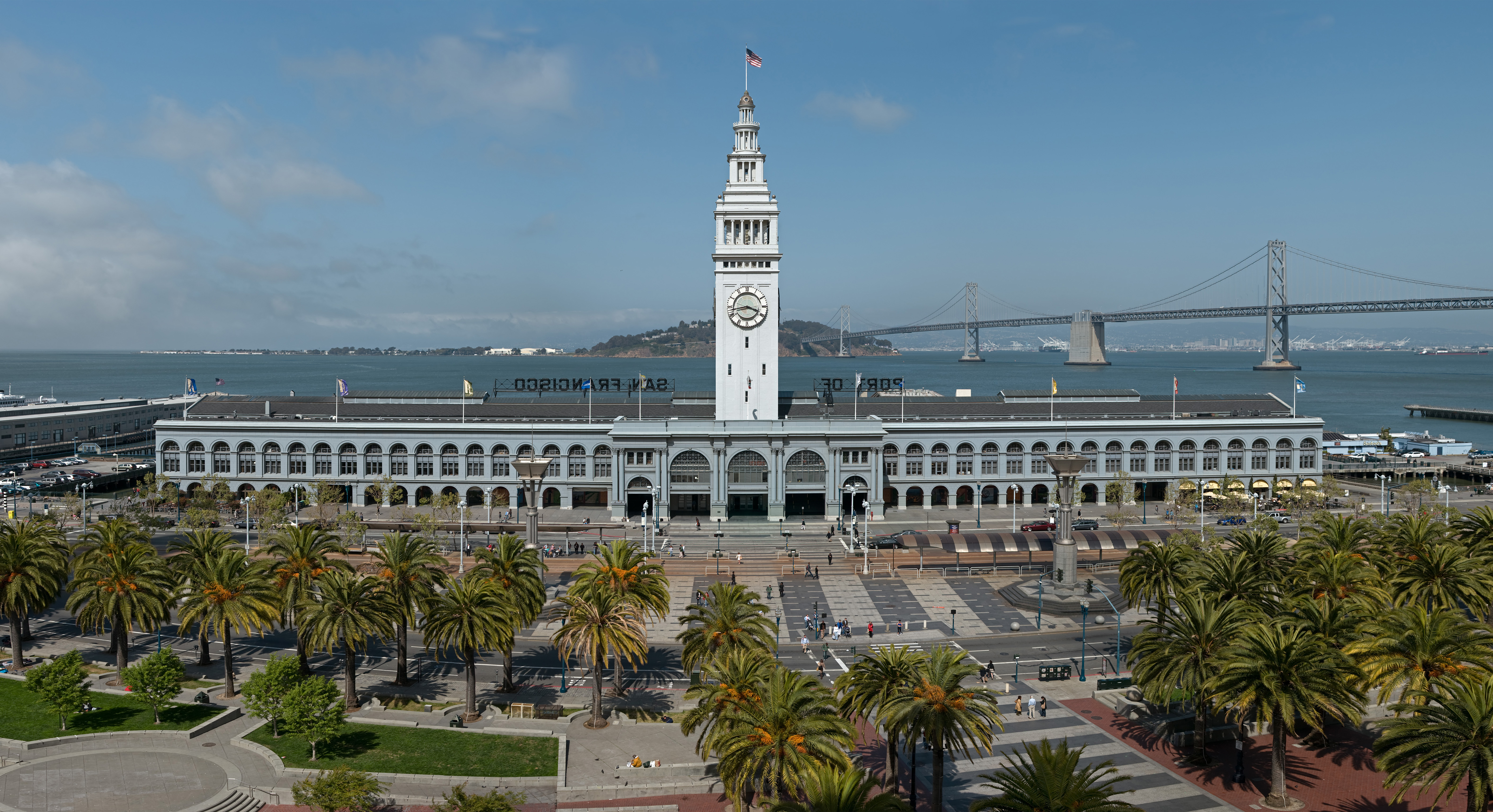
The historic San Francisco Ferry Building is the busiest ferry terminal on the West Coast and connects Downtown San Francisco to various parts of the Bay Area.

- San Francisco Bay Ferry
- Golden Gate Ferry
- Blue & Gold Fleet
- Angel Island – Tiburon Ferry

=== Freeways ===
==== Interstate highways ====
- Interstate 80 (Eastshore Freeway/Lincoln Highway)
- Interstate 280 (Southern Embarcadero Freeway/Southern Freeway/Junipero Serra Freeway/Sinclair Freeway)
- Interstate 380
- Interstate 580 (Eastshore Freeway/MacArthur Freeway/Brown Freeway)
- Interstate 680 (Joseph P. Sinclair Freeway/Donald D. Doyle Highway/Blue Star Memorial Highway/Luther E. Gibson Freeway)
- Interstate 780
- Interstate 880 (Nimitz Freeway)
- Interstate 980 (Grove-Shafter Freeway)
- Interstate 238
- Interstate 5 (Golden State Freeway/West Side Freeway)
- Interstate 205 (Robert T. Monagan Freeway)
- Interstate 505
- Interstate 80 Business (Capital City Freeway)

==== U.S. Routes ====
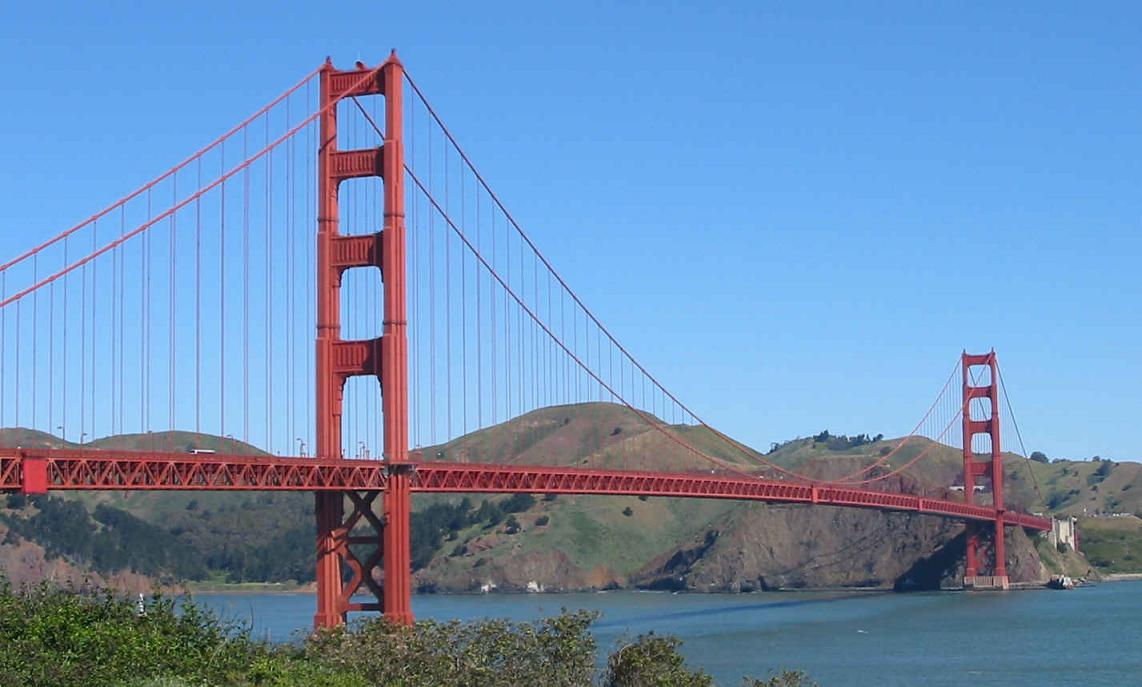
The Golden Gate Bridge is one of northern California's most well-known landmarks and one of the most famous bridges in the world.

- U.S. Route 6
- U.S. Route 50 (El Dorado Freeway)
- U.S. Route 101 (South Valley Freeway/Bayshore Freeway/James Lick Freeway/Central Freeway/Redwood Highway/Michael J. Burns Freeway/Redwood Highway)
- U.S. Route 395
- U.S. Route 97
- U.S. Route 199

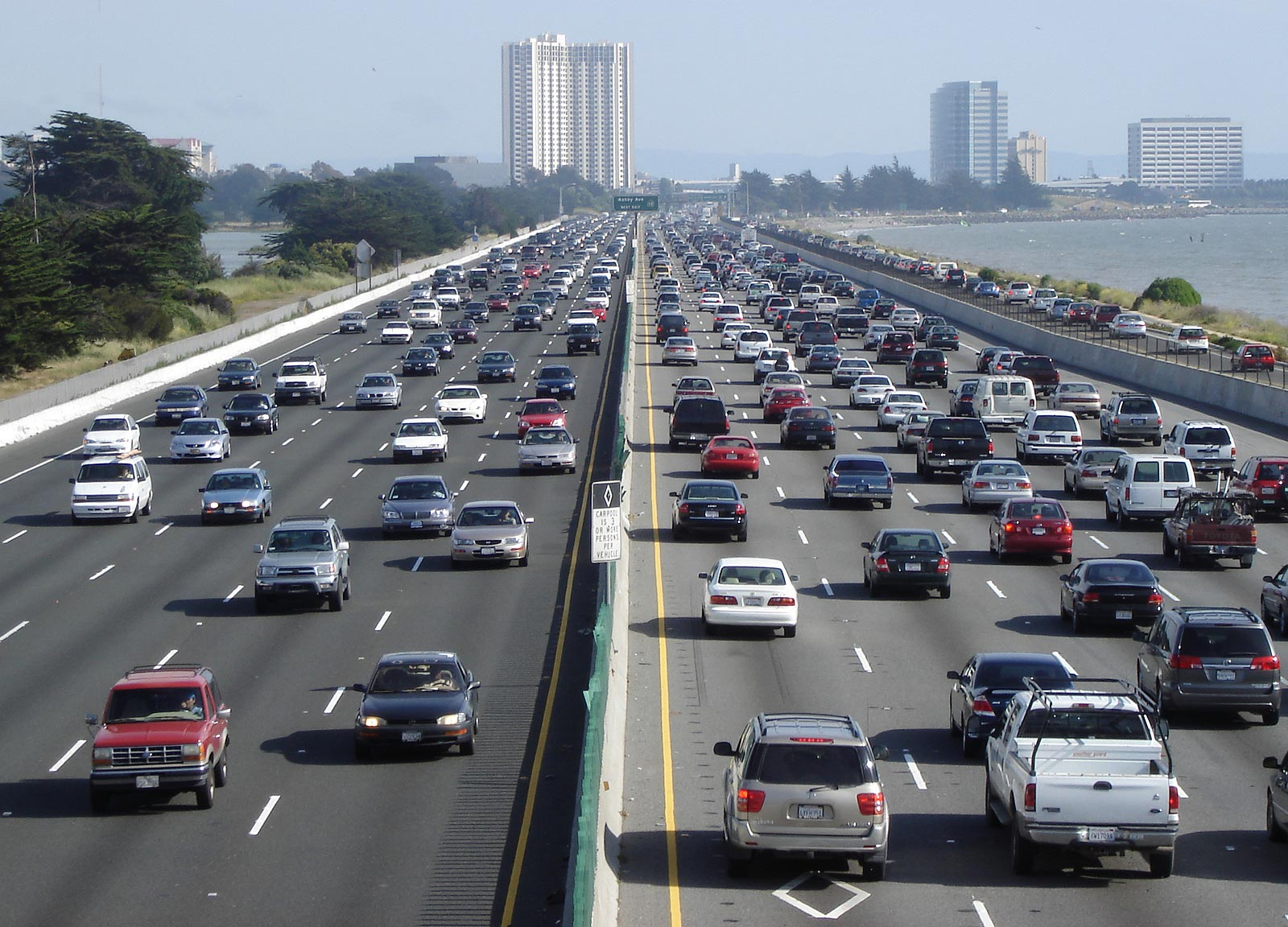
I-80 and I-580 in Berkeley in the Bay Area

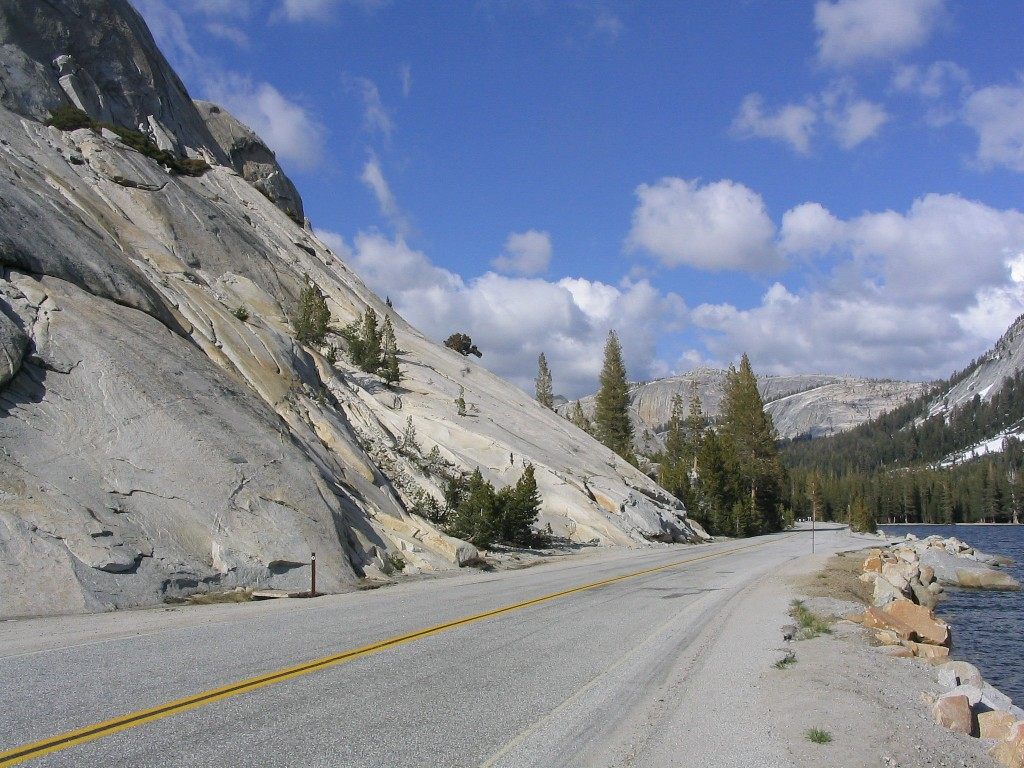
State Route 120 is one of the many highways that traverse the isolated areas of inner northern California.

==== Principal state highways ====
- State Route 1 (Pacific Coast Highway/Cabrillo Highway)
- State Route 3
- State Route 4
- State Route 9
- State Route 12
- State Route 13 (Ashby Avenue/Tunnel Road/Warren Freeway)
- State Route 16
- State Route 17
- State Route 20
- State Route 24
- State Route 25
- State Route 26
- State Route 29
- State Route 32
- State Route 33
- State Route 35 (Skyline Boulevard)
- State Route 36
- State Route 37 (Sears Point Tollway)
- State Route 41 (E.G. Lewis Highway, Yosemite Freeway, Southern Yosemite Highway, Wawona Road)
- State Route 43
- State Route 44
- State Route 49 (Golden Chain Highway)
- State Route 59
- // State Route 61 (Webster Tube/Posey Tube/Doolittle Drive/Davis Street)
- State Route 63
- State Route 65
- State Route 68
- State Route 70
- State Route 82 (Monterey Highway/El Camino Real/Mission Street)
- State Route 84
- State Route 85 (Stevens Creek Freeway/West Valley Freeway/Norman Y. Mineta Highway/CHP Officer Scott M. Greenly Memorial Freeway)
- State Route 87 (Guadalupe Parkway)
- State Route 88
- State Route 89
- State Route 92 (J. Arthur Younger Freeway/Jackson Street)
- State Route 96
- State Route 99
- State Route 104
- State Route 108
- State Route 113
- State Route 116
- State Route 120
- State Route 121
- State Route 128
- State Route 130
- State Route 132
- State Route 137
- State Route 139
- State Route 140
- State Route 152
- State Route 156
- State Route 160 (North Sacramento Freeway/River Road)
- State Route 162
- State Route 165
- State Route 168
- State Route 174
- State Route 180
- / State Route 185 (International Boulevard/East 14th Street/Mission Boulevard)
- State Route 190
- State Route 193
- State Route 198
- State Route 201
- State Route 216
- State Route 219
- State Route 236
- State Route 237
- State Route 238 (Mission Boulevard, Foothill Boulevard)
- State Route 245
- State Route 254 (Avenue of the Giants)
- State Route 262 (Mission Boulevard)
- State Route 267
- State Route 269
- State Route 275 (Tower Bridge Gateway)
- State Route 299

== Communication ==
=== Telephone area codes ===
- 209 — Northern San Joaquin Valley (Stockton, Modesto, and Merced).
- 408/669 — Most of Santa Clara County (San Jose and Gilroy).
- 415/628 — San Francisco, Daly City, and Marin County. One of the three original Area Codes in California.
- 510/341 — Inner East Bay (Oakland, Berkeley, Richmond, and Fremont). Originally part of area code 415.
- 530 — A large northeastern section of the region including Tehama County, Shasta County, Lassen County, Yuba County, Sutter County, Butte County, and Nevada County. Split from area code 916 in 1997–1998.
- 559 — Southern San Joaquin Valley (Madera, Fresno, and Visalia).
- 650 — San Francisco Peninsula (San Mateo, Redwood City, and Palo Alto). Originally part of area code 415.
- 707 — The North Coast section of the region from Sonoma County to the Oregon border. Cities include Eureka, Ukiah, Santa Rosa, Napa, Vallejo and Fairfield.
- 831 — Monterey, San Benito and Santa Cruz Counties. Originally part of area code 408.
- 916/279 — Sacramento County and the Sacramento suburbs in western Placer and El Dorado Counties. One of the three original area codes in California, formerly covered all areas now within 530.
- 925 — Outer East Bay (Concord, Pittsburg, Walnut Creek, San Ramon, Pleasanton and Livermore). Originally part of area codes 415 and 510.

== Sports ==
=== Major league professional sports teams ===
Team	Sport	Bay Area since	League	Venue	City	Average attendance
San Francisco 49ers	American football	1946	NFL	Levi's Stadium	Santa Clara	70,799
San Francisco Giants	Baseball	1958	MLB	Oracle Park	San Francisco	41,677
San Francisco Firebells	Baseball	2025	WPBL	Robin Roberts Stadium	San Francisco	5,900
Golden State Valkyries	Basketball	2025	WNBA	Chase Center	San Francisco	18,064
Golden State Warriors	Basketball	1962	NBA	Chase Center	San Francisco	18,064
San Francisco Signal	Volleyball	2025	LOVB	Bill Graham Civic Auditorium	San Francisco	
NorCal Rumble	Volleyball	2027	MLV	Tech CU Arena	San Jose	
San Jose Sharks	Ice hockey	1991	NHL	SAP Center	San Jose	16,747
San Jose Sea Lions	Ice hockey	2026	PWHL	SAP Center	San Jose	
Bay FC	Soccer	2024	NWSL	PayPal Park	San Jose	13,617
San Jose Earthquakes	Soccer	1996	MLS	PayPal Park	San Jose	20,979
San Francisco Unicorns	Cricket	2023	MLC	Oakland Coliseum	Oakland	11,000
Sacramento Kings	Basketball	1923	NBA	Golden 1 Center	Sacramento	16,140

=== College sports teams ===
- California Golden Bears
- Cal Poly Humboldt Lumberjacks
- Stanford Cardinal
- Fresno State Bulldogs
- San Jose State Spartans
- Sacramento State Hornets
- UC Davis Aggies
- USC Trojans

=== Sports venues ===
- Laguna Seca Raceway (motorsport)
- Sonoma Raceway (motorsport)
- Olympic Club (golf)
- Silverado Country Club (golf)
- TPC Harding Park (golf)
- TPC Stonebrae (golf)

=== Sporting events ===
- Pac-12 Football Championship Game (college football)
- Emerald Bowl (college football)
- AT&T Pebble Beach Pro-Am (golf)
- Frys.com Open (golf)
- Swinging Skirts LPGA Classic (golf)
- Grand Prix of Sonoma (motorsport)
- Toyota/Save Mart 350 (motorsport)
- Monterey Sports Car Championships (motorsport)
- Superbike World Championship (motorsport)

== See also ==
- California megapolitan areas
- Central California
- History of California through 1899
- History of the west coast of North America
- Jefferson (proposed Pacific state)
- Megaregions of the United States
- Southern California
