= Castle Lake (California) =

Lake in California, United States of America

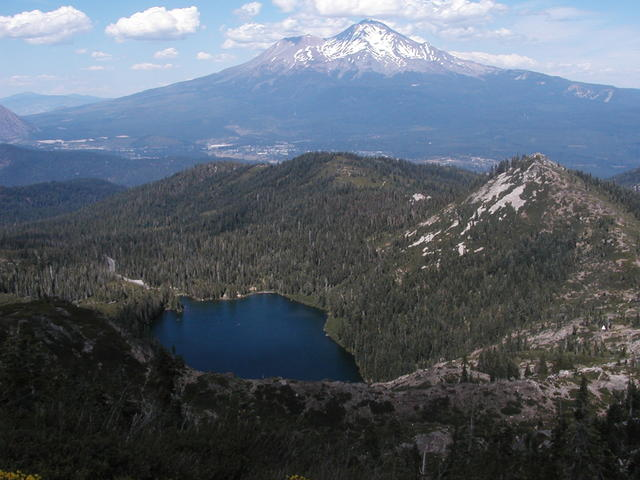
- Castle Lake with Mount Shasta in background

- Location within California Location within the United States
- Location: Trinity Mountains, Shasta-Trinity National Forest, Siskiyou County, California
- Coordinates: 41°13′39″N 122°23′01″W
- Type: cirque lake
- Basin countries: United States
- Surface area: 47 acres (19 ha)
- Max. depth: 110 ft (34 m)
- Surface elevation: 5,440 ft (1,660 m)
- Settlements: Mount Shasta

Castle Lake is a glacial lake (cirque lake or tarn) located in the Trinity Mountains, in Siskiyou County of northern California. It is west of Mount Shasta City and Mount Shasta peak.

The outlet of the lake drains into Castle Lake Creek, and then into Lake Siskiyou reservoir, part of the headwaters of the Sacramento River. Nearly all of the lake's 47 acres (19 ha) are within the Shasta-Trinity National Forest. Trails lead from Castle Lake into the adjacent Castle Crags Wilderness area, and on to Castle Crags State Park, including trails to Little Castle Lake and Heart Lake. Fishing, camping, and hiking are also available at or near the lake.

== Natural history ==
Castle Lake and the surrounding area contain a wide variety of animals and plants including trout, bears, deer, otters, frogs, and osprey. The area is also well-known for early summer displays of flowers, including red Columbine (Aquilegia truncata), fawn lily (Erythronium sp.), and Shasta pentstemon (Pentstemon laetus).

Castle Lake is home as well to the Castle Lake Limnological Research Station affiliated with the University of California at Davis (UC Davis), which uses the site for study and to teach limnology courses (in conjunction with the University of Nevada, Reno).

== Recreation ==
The lake is usually reached by driving along an approximately 7 mi (11 km) road from Lake Siskiyou. About 3 mi (4.8 km) from the lake, along this road, are Ney Springs and Faery Falls. Ney Springs is the site of the historic Ney Springs Resort, a late 19th-century resort based on the mineral springs there; this resort was one of a number of such popular resorts in Siskiyou County, including Upper Soda Springs, and Shasta Springs. A short hiking trail leads to nearby Faery Falls, where Ney Springs Creek falls nearly 60 ft (18 m) down a granite cliff face, forming a clear pool at the bottom.

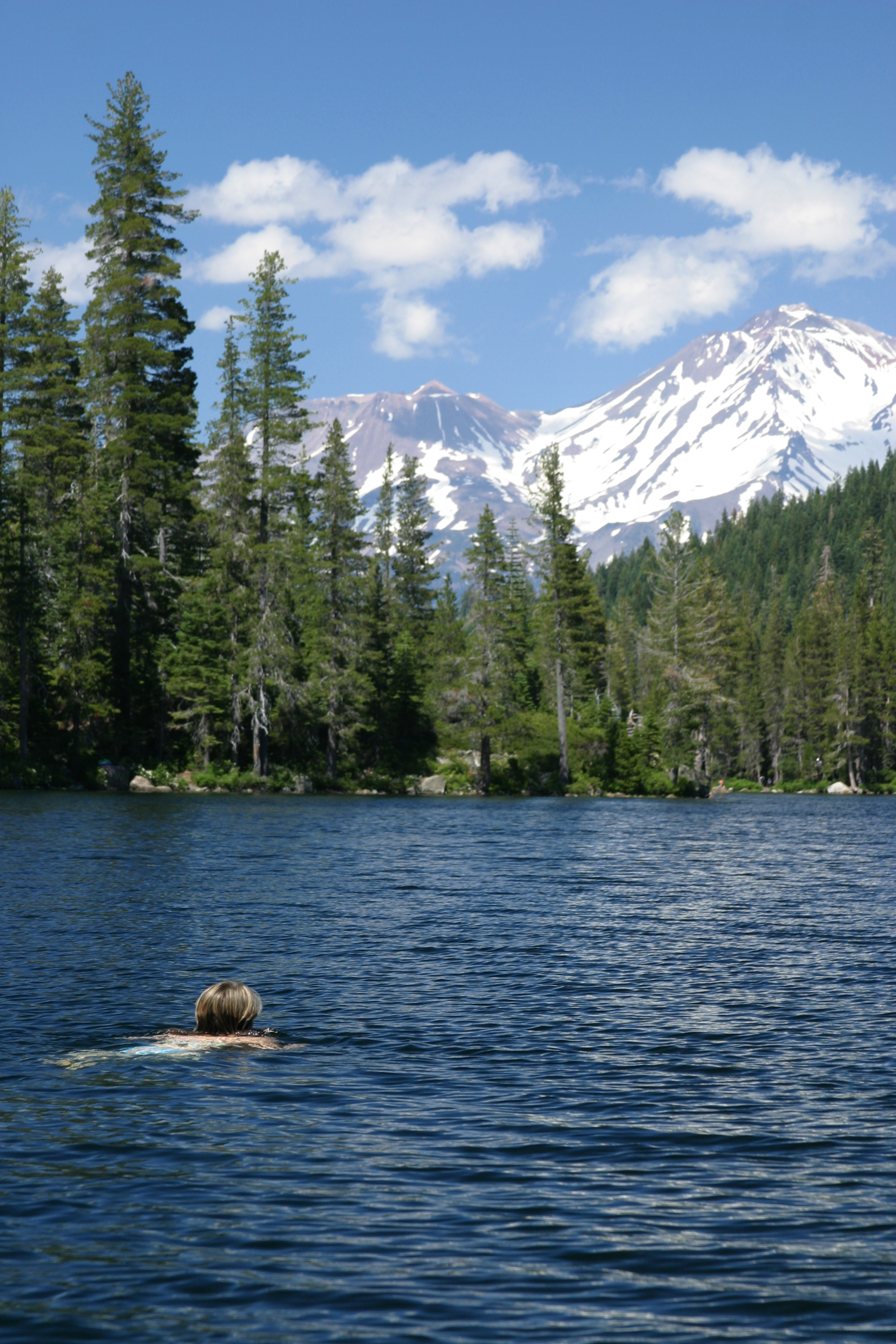
Swimmer with Mount Shasta in distance

About one-quarter mile (400 m) north of Castle Lake is a campground with 6 first-come, first-served campsites. At the lake itself, fishing and picnicking, as well as viewing the local plant life, wildlife and scenery, are common activities. The lake waters can be cool, so swimming is generally limited to summer months. Kayaking, rowboating and rafting are available on the lake. In the winter, in addition to cross-country skiing and snow-shoeing along the trails in the area, the lake will ice over and ice fishing is a common activity.

From the parking area at the lake, a half-mile (1 km) trail winds along the northern and western shore of the lake, ending at the granite face of the headwall, which forms the southern shore. Along the way, hikers will pass the Castle Lake Limnological Research Station.

Following the eastern shore, the Little Castle Lake Trail leaves the parking area, and then climbs the adjoining ridge; about 1 mi (1.6 km) along this trail is Little Castle Lake, a small glacial tarn reached by passing through meadows of wild flowers in the early summer. Little Castle Lake is within the Castle Crags Wilderness Area. Heart Lake, another small tarn, located above the headwall of Castle Lake, may also be reached via an informal cut-off from the Little Castle Lake Trail.

At this point, the well-known Pacific Crest National Scenic Trail is one-half mile (1 km) away, just over the Trinity Divide. The Pacific Crest National Scenic Trail stretches from Mexico to Canada, following the highest portion of the Sierra Nevada, Klamath Mountains, and Cascade Range and paralleling the Pacific Ocean by 100 to 150 miles (160 to 240 kilometres).

The Little Castle Lake Trail continues on to Mt. Bradley, a locally prominent mountain with views of Mount Shasta, overlooking Dunsmuir, California and the canyon of the Upper Sacramento River. Along the way, the trail joins with a network of connections leading into Castle Crags State Park.

== Formation ==
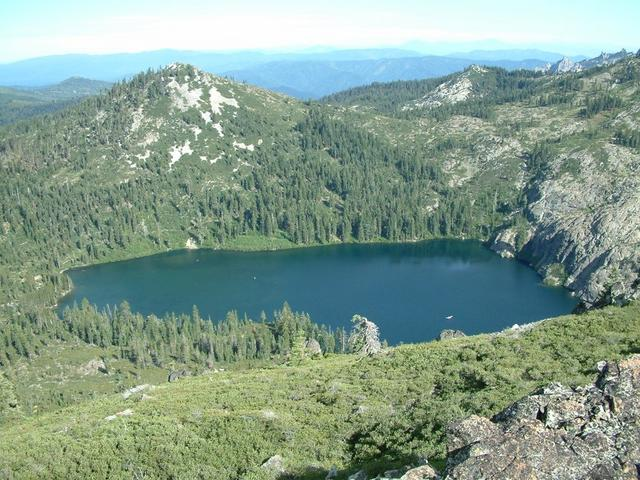
Castle Lake with the headwall at the right, and the terminal moraine at the left.

The lake's origins date to the Pleistocene Era (more than 10,000 years ago) when a glacier carved a basin in the location of the current lake. During that era, much of North America was glaciated. Castle Lake is a typical glacier cirque lake (or tarn), reaching depths of up to 110 ft (34 m) near the southern, granitic part of the lakeshore (the cirque face). There is a terminal moraine of boulders and gravel forming a natural dam opposite the cirque face along the northeastern shore of the lake, where there is an outlet, and the lake is 10 to 15 feet (3.0 to 4.6 metres) deep.

The cirque where Castle Lake is found is a classic Northern Hemisphere cirque. The cirque headwall (the highest part of the mountain where the glacier began to form) was in the south or southwest, and the part of the mountain that sloped downward to the northeast was away from the prevailing winds. The resulting shaded area was sheltered from direct sun, and from the evaporating effects of wind. These conditions encouraged snow which had fallen in the winter to remain throughout the summer and fall, creating a year-round snow pack which grew deeper each year.

Formation of cirque and resulting tarn.

During initial glacial formation, snow changed into glacial ice as this year-round snow pack increased and deepened. The process of nivation followed (where a hollow in a slope was enlarged by freeze-thaw weathering and glacial erosion). As the hollow enlarged and filled with snow and ice, rock debris (or till) contained within the glacial ice also began to abrade the bedrock surface – as the glacial ice moved down the slope, it had a "sandpaper effect" on the bedrock which it scraped.

Eventually the hollow took the shape of a large bowl in the side of the mountain, with the headwall being weathered by constant freezing and thawing, and eroded by plucking. The basin became deeper (especially at the base of the headwall) as it continued to be eroded by abrasion.

When the current warming period began, the glacier retreated and finally melted completely. It left behind a bowl shape, deepest at the base of the headwall where the glacial ice had been the deepest and most abrasive. The bowl shape extended to its northeast edge, where there was a terminal moraine of smaller rocks and debris which had been deposited by the glacier. When the bowl-shaped crater filled with water, this terminal moraine acted as a natural dam, helping to contain the water in the newly formed cirque lake.

== History ==
Castle Lake was within the range of the Okwanuchu tribe, one of a number of small Shastan-speaking tribes of Native Americans who were closely related to the adjacent larger Shasta tribe. The Okwanuchu occupied territory near Mount Shasta, including the nearby present-day cities of Mount Shasta and Dunsmuir, California, and the upper Sacramento River canyon (among other areas). The Okwanuchu were speakers of the older Hokan-speaking family of languages, with archaeological sites associated with their range dating back more than 5000 years. However, members of a tribe of the Penutian-speaking family of languages, the Wintu, who arrived in central Northern California about 1200 years ago, were out-competing their Hokan-language family neighbors, and were expanding Wintu territory. It is unclear at the time of first contact with non-Native Americans in the 1820s which tribe was living nearest to Castle Lake. Little or no information is available about Native American use or beliefs regarding Castle Lake; for example, Castle Lake is not mentioned in a published collection of Wintu tales and legends.

The first non-Native Americans to pass through the area of Castle Lake were hunters and trappers of the Hudson's Bay Company, who began to come down the Siskiyou Trail from present-day Washington into Mexican-controlled California, in the late 1820s and early 1830s, in search of beaver and other pelt-bearing animals. At about this same time, Ewing Young led the first group of Americans up the Siskiyou Trail, passing near Castle Lake. In 1841, an overland party of the United States Exploring Expedition, the first cartographers and scientists came through the area. Following the annexation of California by the United States in 1848 as a result of the Mexican–American War, Castle Lake came under the control of the U.S. Federal Government as public land.

In 1855, an area near Castle Lake, now known as Battle Rock, was the site of a battle between Native Americans and California Gold Rush-era settlers. The poet Joaquin Miller wrote a first-hand account of this battle, The Battle of Castle Crags, in which Miller took part in the fight, and received an arrow wound through the cheek and jaw. This battle was reportedly the last battle between Native Americans and settlers in which the Native Americans fought exclusively with bow and arrow.

With the development, first, of the U.S. "Forest Reserve" system in the late 19th century, and then the organization of the U.S. National Forests in the early 20th century, Castle Lake came under the stewardship of the U.S. Forest Service. The association between U.C. Davis and Castle Lake began in 1957, with the first extensive study done of the lake, followed by the construction of the "Castle Lake Limnological Research Station". Archived from the original on September 1, 2010. itself.

== Animal life ==
Humans introduced fish into the lake in the 1930s for sport fishing, including rainbow trout (Oncorhynchus mykiss), brook trout (Salvelinus fontinalis), and golden shiner (Notemigonus crysoliecas). Trout were last released into Castle Lake in 2008 by the California Department of Fish and Wildlife but recreational fish stocking has since ceased due to concern for other species (i.e., threatened or endangered). The brook char was also originally stocked but now has become self-sustaining, and reproduces naturally in springs found on the eastern side of the lake. Golden shiner is a bait fish minnow that was likely placed in the lake by anglers who left their remaining bait behind in the lake. The fish feed on zooplankton and insects; the fish are then eaten by predators around the lake, especially osprey (Pandion haliaetus). Other birds in the area include bald eagle (Haliaectus leucoephalus), golden eagle (Aquila chrysaetos), peregrine falcon (Falco peregrinus), wood duck (Aix sponsa), belted kingfisher (Megaceryle alcyon), Steller's jay (Cyanocitta stellere), and sooty grouse (Dendragapus fuliginosus).

Reptiles and amphibians around the lake, including the rough-skinned newt (Taricha granulosa), the Cascades frog (Rana cascadae) and the garter snake (Thamnophis sirtalis), feed as well on insects and young fish (among other prey). Many mammals can be found around the lake and in the adjacent wilderness area, national forest, and parklands. These include black bear (Ursus americanus), blacktail deer (Odocoileus hemionus), river otter (Lutra canadensis), black-tailed jackrabbit (Lepus californicus), and mountain lion (also known as "cougars" or "puma") (Puma concolor). Castle lake cougars have on occasion been known to crouch in the bushes and watch humans, their eyes shining in the moonlight. No attacks have been noted.

== Plant life ==
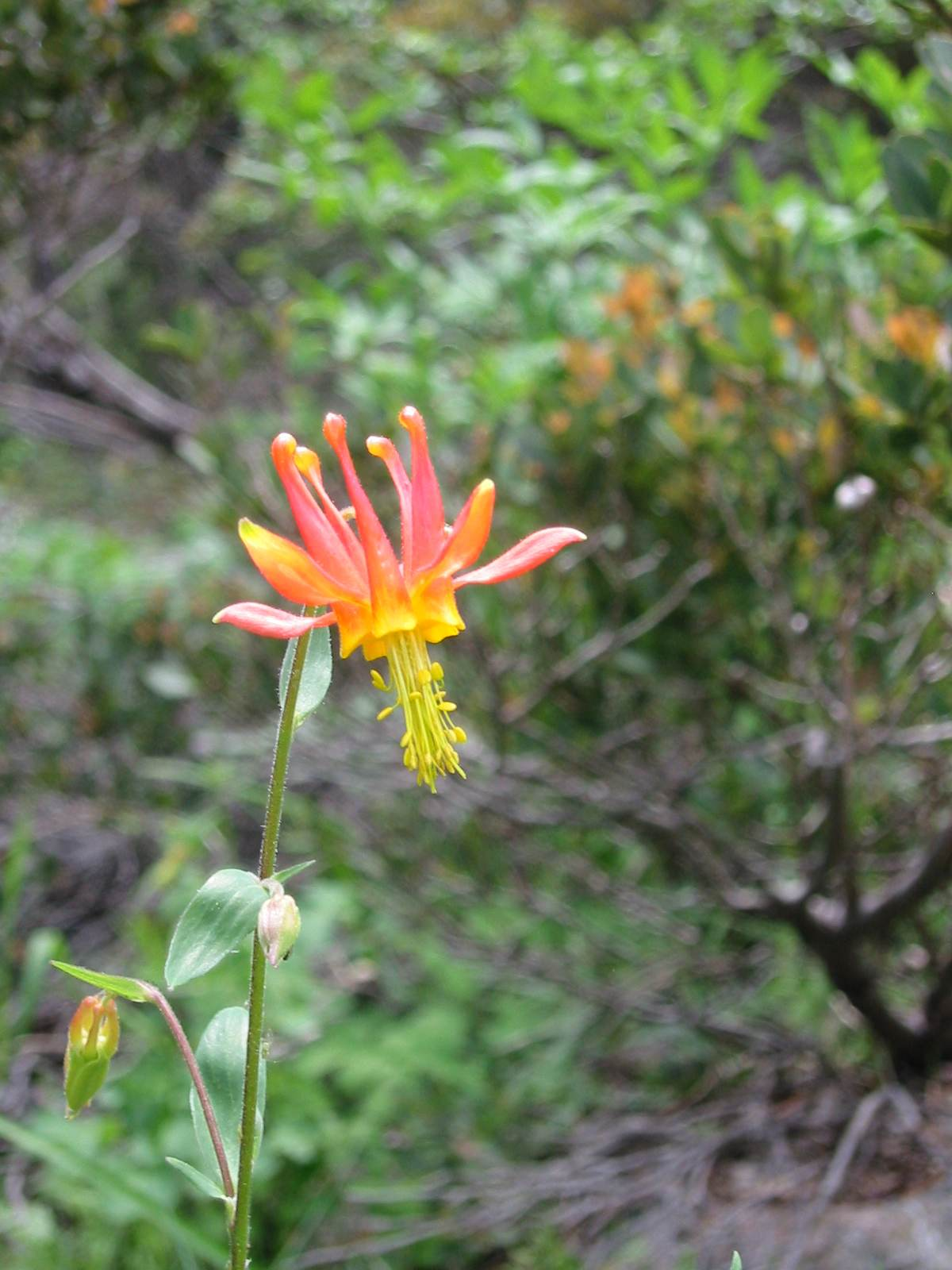
Red Columbine (Aquilegia formosa) taken at Castle Lake June 2004.

Although the lake (at elevation 5,574 ft (1,699 m)) and surrounding areas are well below local tree line (for example, on nearby Mount Shasta, the tree line is at about 7,900 ft (2,400 m)), because of the high concentration of granite and the often exposed steep, rocky slopes, the vegetation at the lake and in the area can vary widely, from dense mixed forest near and below the lake to the appearance of near-alpine conditions above the lake.

At and in the area below the lake, mixed forests of ponderosa pine (Pinus ponderosa), red fir (Abies Magnifica), white fir (Abies Concolor), lodgepole pine (Pinus Contorda), incense cedar (Libocedrus decurrens), and alder can be found. Alders play a particularly important role, as alders establish symbioses with the nitrogen-fixing Actinomycetota (Frankiella alni). This bacteria converts atmospheric nitrogen into soil-soluble nitrates which can be utilised by the alder, and favorably enhances the soil fertility generally. Alders benefit other plants growing near them by taking nitrogen out of the air and depositing it in the soil in usable form; fallen alder leaves make very rich compost. The rarely-seen Brewer spruce (Picea breweriana) exists in a few small locations on the igneous slopes behind the lake. Other deciduous trees at lower elevations in the area may include such species as bigleaf maple, vine maple, black oak and Pacific dogwood.

At higher elevations above the lake (especially in rocky or exposed locations), the pine and fir tree forests are thinner, and the trees grow in a more stunted fashion; instead, shrubs and bushes, such as green manzanita (Arctostaphylos patula), dwarf mountain manzanita (Arctostaphylos nevadensis), and tan oak (Lithocarpus densiflorus) find areas and niches to grow. Other shrubs found around the lake are Sierra laurel (Leucothoe davisiae), and the lake is ringed with western azaleas (Rhododendron occidentale), which bloom mostly in June.

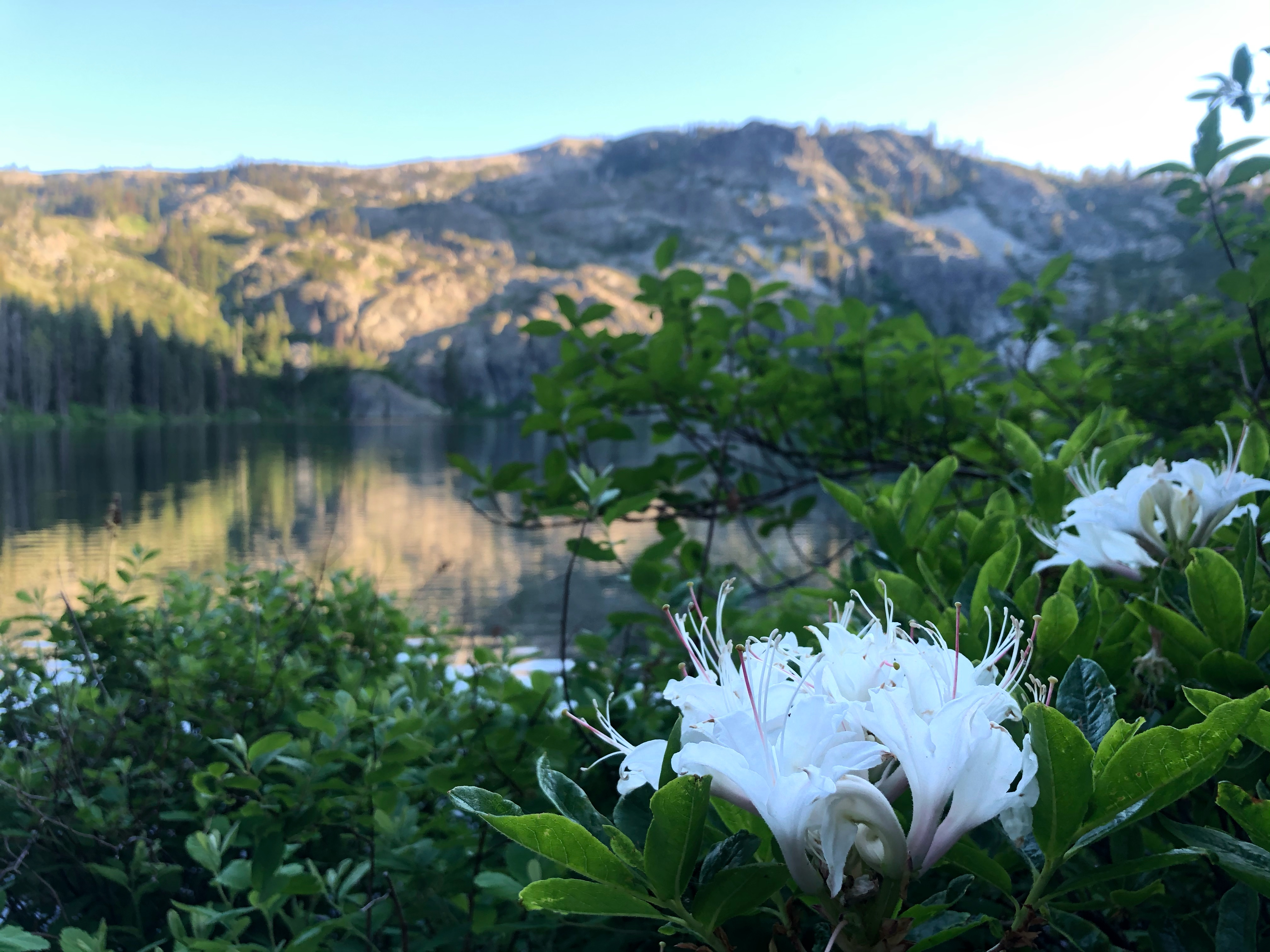
Western azalea (Rhododendron occidentale). Taken at Castle Lake June 2020.

The best-known plant life in the area, however, are the lakeside and nearby meadow displays of alpine and sub-alpine flowers in the early summer. These can include wood rose (Rosa gymnocarpa), Shasta lupine (Lupinus albicaulis), red/crimson/scarlet columbine (Aquilegia formosa), tiger lily (Lilium pardalinum), fawn lily (Erythronium sp.), pine-drops (Pterospora andromedea), douglas spiraea (Spiraea douglasii), scarlet paintbrush (Castilleja pinetorum), alpine paintbrush (Castilleja arachnoidea), dwarf paintbrush (Castilleja miniata), alpine saxifrage (Saxifraga nidifica), Shasta penstemon (Penstemon laetus), alpine buckwheat (Eriogonum pyrolifolium), and Tofield's swamp lily (Tofieldia occidentalis). Also, in cool, wet spots near the lake, carnivorous Pitcher Plants (Darlingtonia californica) appear.

== See also ==
- List of lakes in California
