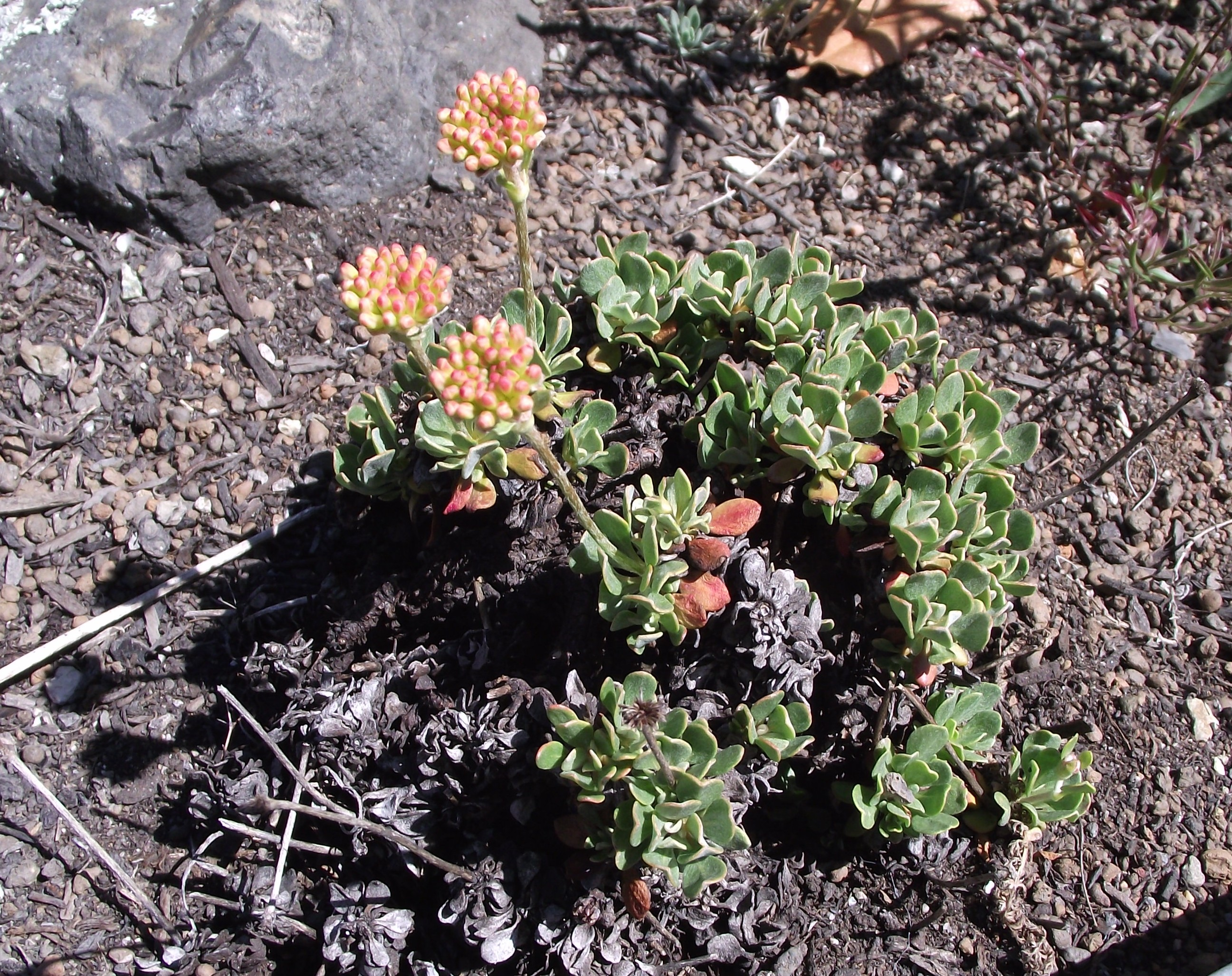

Scientific classification
- Kingdom: Plantae
- Clade: Tracheophytes
- Clade: Angiosperms
- Clade: Eudicots
- Order: Caryophyllales
- Family: Polygonaceae
- Genus: Eriogonum
- Species: E. siskiyouense

Binomial name
- Eriogonum siskiyouense Small

= Eriogonum siskiyouense =

Species of plant

Eriogonum siskiyouense is a rare species of wild buckwheat known by the common name Siskiyou buckwheat.

== Distribution ==
The plant is endemic to far northern California. It is known only from the area between Mount Eddy in the Trinity Mountains and the Scott Mountains, around the border of Siskiyou County and Trinity County. Both ranges are in the southern Klamath Mountains System.

It is a member of the local serpentine soils flora, found at elevations of 1,600–2,800 metres (5,200–9,200 ft) in yellow pine forest habitats within the Shasta-Trinity National Forest.

== Description ==
Eriogonum siskiyouense is perennial herb forms mats up to 0.5 metres (1.6 ft) wide around a woody caudex. It bears clusters of small rounded to oval leaves each under a centimeter long and coated in gray woolly fibers at least on the undersides.

The flowering stem arising from the caudex has a whorl of two to four leaflike bracts around the middle and is otherwise naked but for a coat of woolly hairs. Atop the scape are the bright yellow flowers, which are usually arranged in a spherical cluster.
