= Box Canyon Dam (California) =

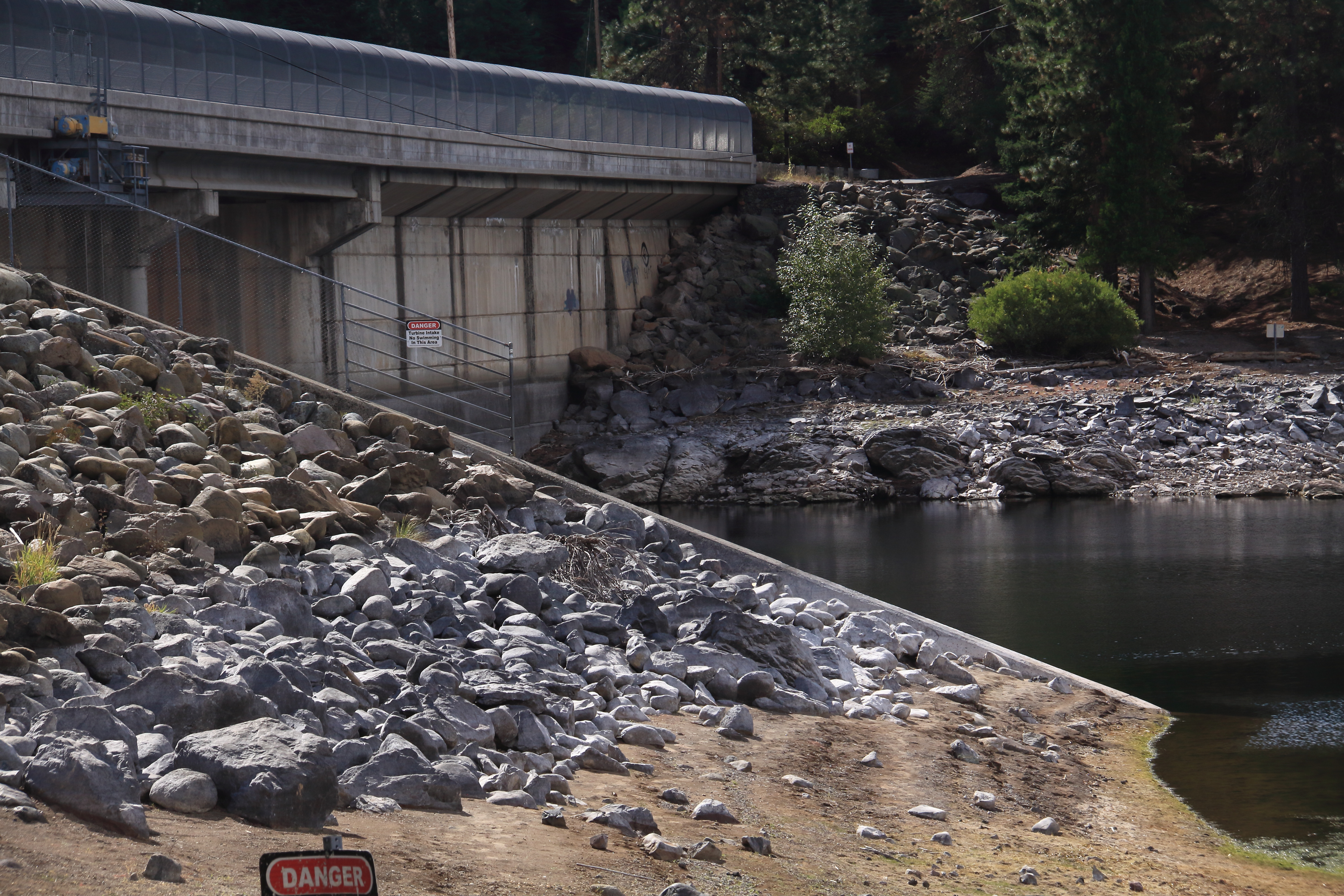
- Interactive map of Box Canyon Dam
- Location: Trinity Mountains, Shasta National Forest, Siskiyou County, California
- Coordinates: 41.279°N 122.329°W
- Opening date: 1970; 56 years ago (dam); 1984; 42 years ago (powerhouse)
- Operators: Siskiyou County Flood Control & Water Conservation District and Siskiyou Power Authority

Dam and spillways
- Impounds: Upper Sacramento River
- Height: 209 ft (64 m)
- Length: 1,100 ft (340 m)
- Width (base): 200 feet (61 m)

Reservoir
- Creates: Lake Siskiyou
- Total capacity: 26,000 acre⋅ft (32,000,000 m^{3})
- Surface area: 430 acres (170 ha)

Box Canyon Dam is a concrete gravity dam on the Upper Sacramento River impounding Lake Siskiyou reservoir, in Siskiyou County, northern California.

== Description ==
The dam and reservoir are located in Box Canyon of the eastern Trinity Mountains and within the Shasta–Trinity National Forest, southwest of the town of Mount Shasta and Mount Shasta peak.

Box Canyon Dam is 1,100 feet (340 m) long and 209 feet (64 m) high. The dam is owned and operated by Siskiyou County's Flood Control & Water Conservation District and Siskiyou Power Authority, and was completed in 1965 to provide flood control. In 1965, a powerhouse was installed to provide hydroelectric power.

== History ==
Beginning in April 1959, the State of California appropriated funding to study the feasibility of building the dam. In the 1963 legislative session, following the passage of the Davis-Grunsky Act/Proposition One of 1960 (which initiated the California State Water Project) the California State legislature authorized $2,800,00 for the Box Canyon Dam and Reservoir project. In 1965, Assembly Bill No. 251 authorized a dedicated grant to the Siskiyou County Flood Control and Water Conservation District, or the Mount Shasta Recreation and Park District of $2,000,000 for the Box Canyon Dam and Reservoir Project.

== Recreation ==
The Box Canyon Trail begins on the north side of Box Canyon Dam, following the Upper Sacramento River down the narrow canyon to the outskirts of the town of Mount Shasta. The Lake Siskiyou Trail encircles the lake, including a crossing atop the dam.

== See also ==
- Dams on the Sacramento River
- List of dams and reservoirs in California
