= Battle of Castle Crags =

Historical place in Shasta County, United States

Battle Rock
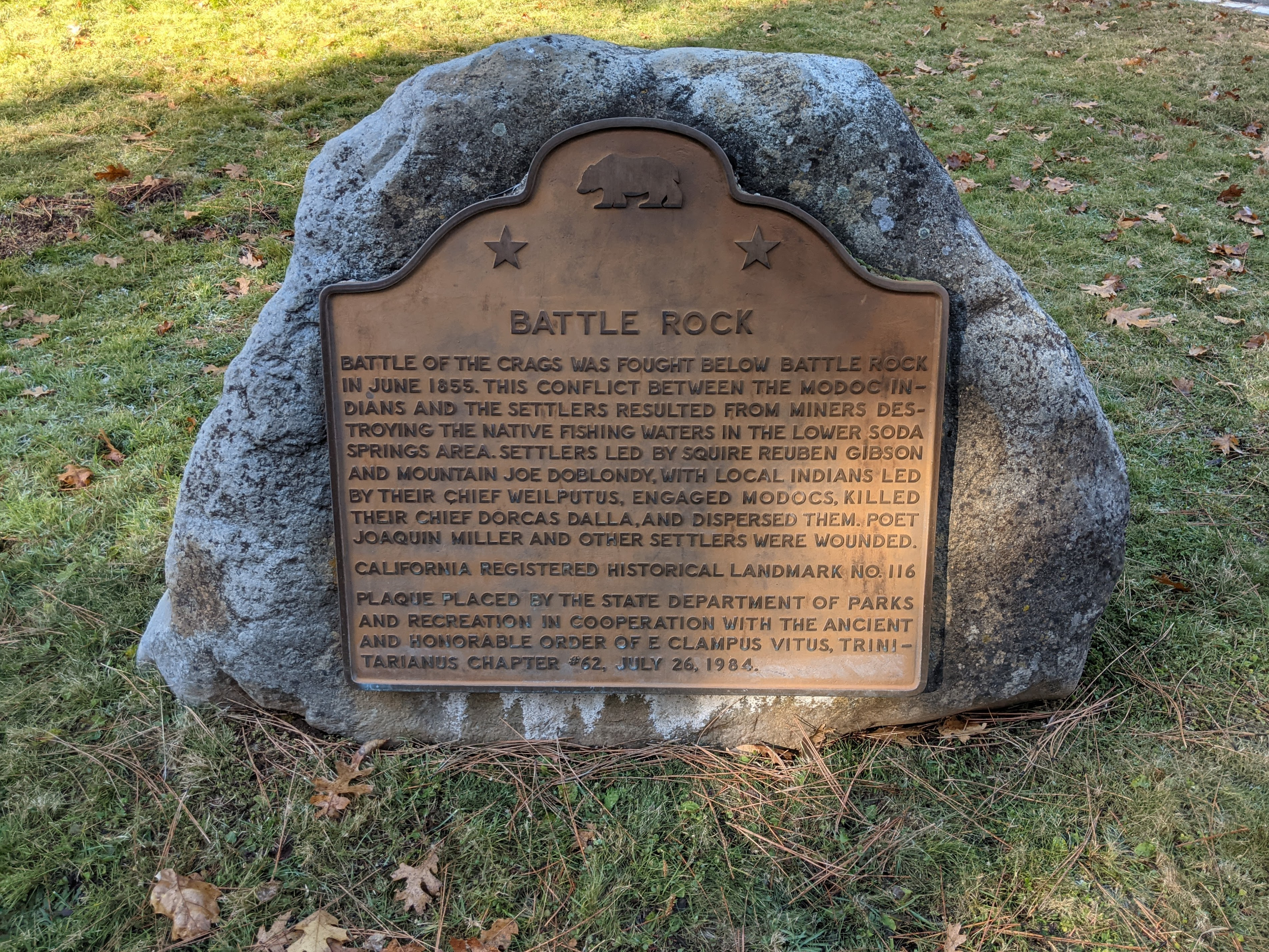
- Battle Rock Marker

- Location within California Location within the United States
- 41.1482°N 122.3215°W
- Location: Castle Crags State Park, Castella, California

History
- Built: 1855

California Historical Landmark
- Designated: March 29, 1933
- Reference no.: 116

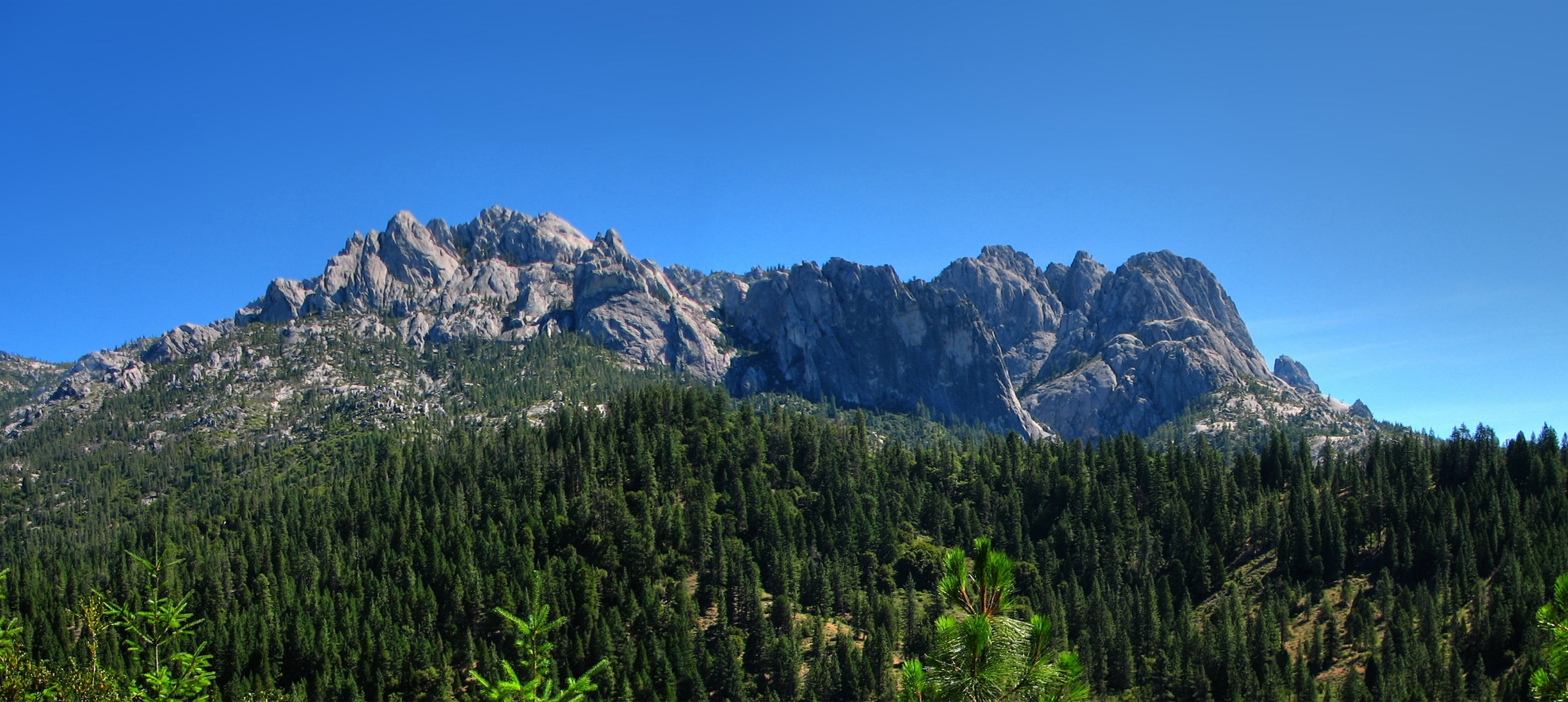
Castle Crags in Castle Crags Wilderness

Battle Rock is a historical site of the Battle of the Crags at Castle Crags in Castella, California in Shasta County. The Battle Rock site is a California Historical Landmark No. 116 listed on March 29, 1933. The Battle of the Crags took place below Battle Rock in June 1855. The battle was fought on a ridge saddle between Castle lake and Battle Rock. Battle of the Crags was a battle between the Modoc people and the early settlers. Most of the settlers were California Gold Rush miners. The miners' operation destroyed the Modoc fishing areas by filling the Lower Soda Springs area with silt from mining. Squire Reuben Gibson and Mountain Joe Doblondy, the leaders of the miners and settlers, tried to entice Chief Weilputus, a leader of a local tribe who also were engaged in conflict with Modocs, to join them. The group battled the Modocs in June 1855 and was able to kill Modoc Chief Dorcas Della. With the loss of their leader the Modocs departed the area. Some of the miners and settlers were wounded in the battle, including Poet Joaquin Miller. Miller wrote later that he was shot at, and had an arrow go through his jaw and neck. Doc McCloud at Portuguese Flat inn worked on Miller's wounds and he rested there with the help of Mary Campbell McCloud. The battle was a precursor to the later and larger Modoc War between the Modoc people and the United States Army.

The marker is at the entrance to the Castle Crags State Park. The marker was placed there by the California Department of Parks and Recreation and E Clampus Vitus, Trinitarianus Chapter 62 in 1984.

== See also ==
- California Historical Landmarks in Shasta County
