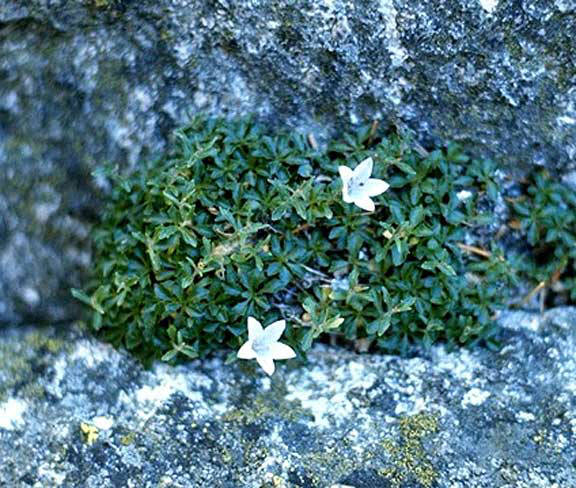

Conservation status
- Imperiled (NatureServe)

Scientific classification
- Kingdom: Plantae
- Clade: Tracheophytes
- Clade: Angiosperms
- Clade: Eudicots
- Clade: Asterids
- Order: Asterales
- Family: Campanulaceae
- Genus: Campanula
- Species: C. shetleri

Binomial name
- Campanula shetleri Heckard

= Campanula shetleri =

Species of flowering plant

Campanula shetleri is a rare species of bellflower known by the common name Castle Crags bellflower. The plant is named for Castle Crags, a mountain formation in its limited native range, within the Shasta-Trinity National Forest.

It is endemic to California, where it is known from fewer than ten occurrences in the southern reaches of the Cascade Range near the border between Siskiyou and Shasta Counties.

== Description ==
Campanula shetleri is a plant of the temperate coniferous forests of the range. This is a small, clumpy perennial herb growing from a woody rhizome. It produces a patch of hairy leaves not more than 5 centimeters high, each leaf leathery in texture with approximately two large pointed teeth on each edge.

The flower is about a centimeter long, white to pale blue with corolla lobes curled back and a protruding style.

The fruit is a ribbed, cup-shaped capsule containing tiny seeds each about millimeter wide.
