= Trinity Mountains =

California Coast Ranges, in Northern California, United States

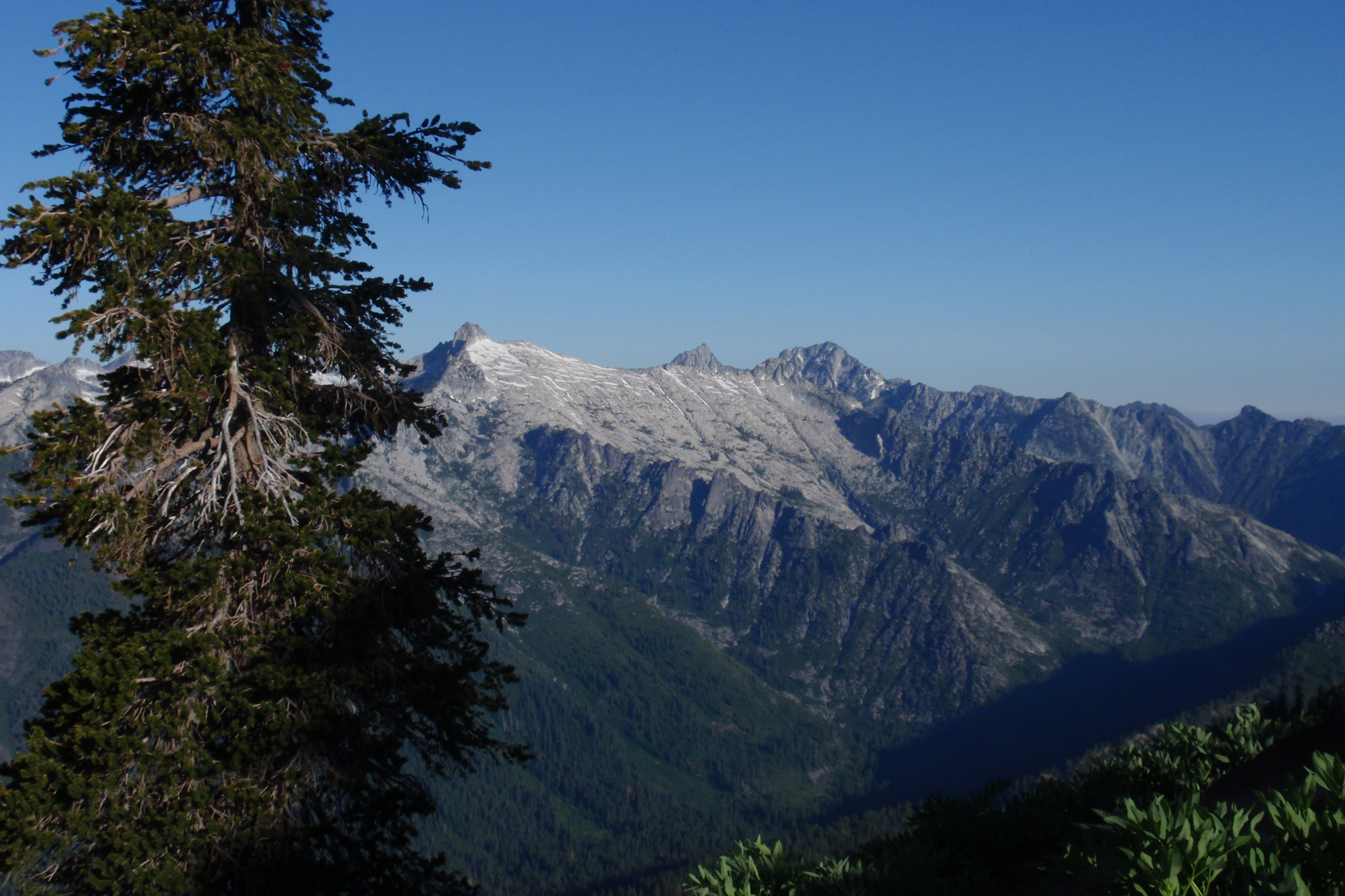
- Trinity County Mountains

Highest point
- Peak: Mount Eddy
- Elevation: 9,037 ft (2,754 m) NAVD 88
- Coordinates: 41°19′11″N 122°28′45″W

Geography
- Location within California
- Country: United States
- State: California
- Counties: Siskiyo; Trinity
- Protected area: Shasta–Trinity National Forest
- Range coordinates: 40°53′20.53″N 122°38′26.07″W
- Parent range: Klamath Mountains System, Shasta Cascade
- Topo map: USGS Mount Eddy

The Trinity Mountains are a subrange of the Klamath Mountains, one of the ranges within the California Coast Ranges and part the greater Pacific Coast Ranges, the coastal mountain system extending from Mexico to Alaska. The Trinity Mountains subrange rises in Siskiyou County and eastern Trinity County, Northern California.

They are protected within the Shasta–Trinity National Forest.

== Geography ==
The Trinity Mountains run in a southwest-northeasterly direction for 30–35 miles (48–56 km). The subrange runs between Trinity Lake and Lake Shasta, around 17 miles (27 km) northwest of Redding.

Peaks of the Trinity Mountains rise to elevations of 4,000 feet (1,200 m) in the southwest, and to more than 7,200 feet (2,200 m) in the northeast. Mount Eddy is the highest peak, at 9,037 ft (2,754 m), and is the highest point of the northern segment of the Pacific Coast Ranges within the lower forty-eight states.

== Recreation ==
Places for outdoor recreation in the Trinity Mountains and their foothills include:

- Box Canyon Dam and Reservoir — trails + camping.
- Castle Crags State Park
- Castle Crags Wilderness Area
- Castle Lake
- Chapple-Shasta Off-Highway Vehicle Area.
- Clear Creek
- Whiskeytown-Shasta-Trinity National Recreation Area
  - Lewiston Lake reservoir area, in the Trinity Unit.
  - Shasta Lake reservoir area, in the Shasta Unit.
  - Trinity Lake reservoir area, in the Trinity Unit.
  - Whiskeytown Lake reservoir area, in the Whiskeytown Unit.

== Natural history ==
The Trinity Mountains contain significant forested areas, including stands of Black Oak (Quercus kelloggii), Blue Oak (Quercus douglasii) and Douglas-fir (Pseudotsuga menziesii). The Quercus douglasii occurrences are a disjunctive population of this California endemic tree species.

== See also ==
- Trinity Mountains topics
- Flora of the Klamath Mountains
