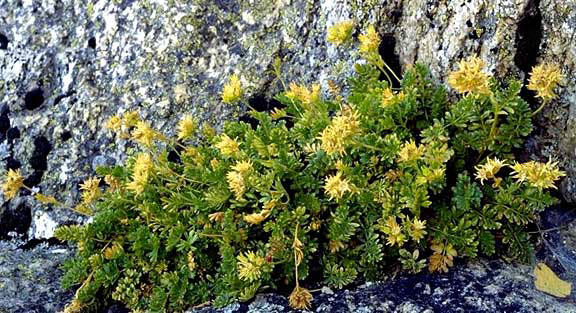

Conservation status
- Critically Imperiled (NatureServe)

Scientific classification
- Kingdom: Plantae
- Clade: Tracheophytes
- Clade: Angiosperms
- Clade: Eudicots
- Clade: Rosids
- Order: Rosales
- Family: Rosaceae
- Genus: Potentilla
- Species: P. longibracteata

Binomial name
- Potentilla longibracteata (Ertter) Mosyakin & Shiyan

Synonyms
- Ivesia longibracteata Ertter

= Potentilla longibracteata =

Species of flowering plant

Potentilla longibracteata, also known as Castle Crags ivesia and longbract mousetail, is a rare species of flowering plant in the rose family. It is endemic to Shasta County, California, where it is known only from Castle Crags. It grows in rocky granite habitat in the temperate coniferous forest.

== Description ==
Potentilla longibracteata is a perennial herb forming a glandular green tuft of foliage where it grows from crevices in granite rock. The leaves are 2 to 4 centimeters long and are made up of several pairs of lobed leaflets. The inflorescence is a headlike cluster of several flowers 1 or 2 centimeters wide. Each flower is just under a centimeter long and has tiny pale yellow petals.
