= Castle Crags Wilderness =

Protected wilderness area in California

- IUCN category Ib (wilderness area)
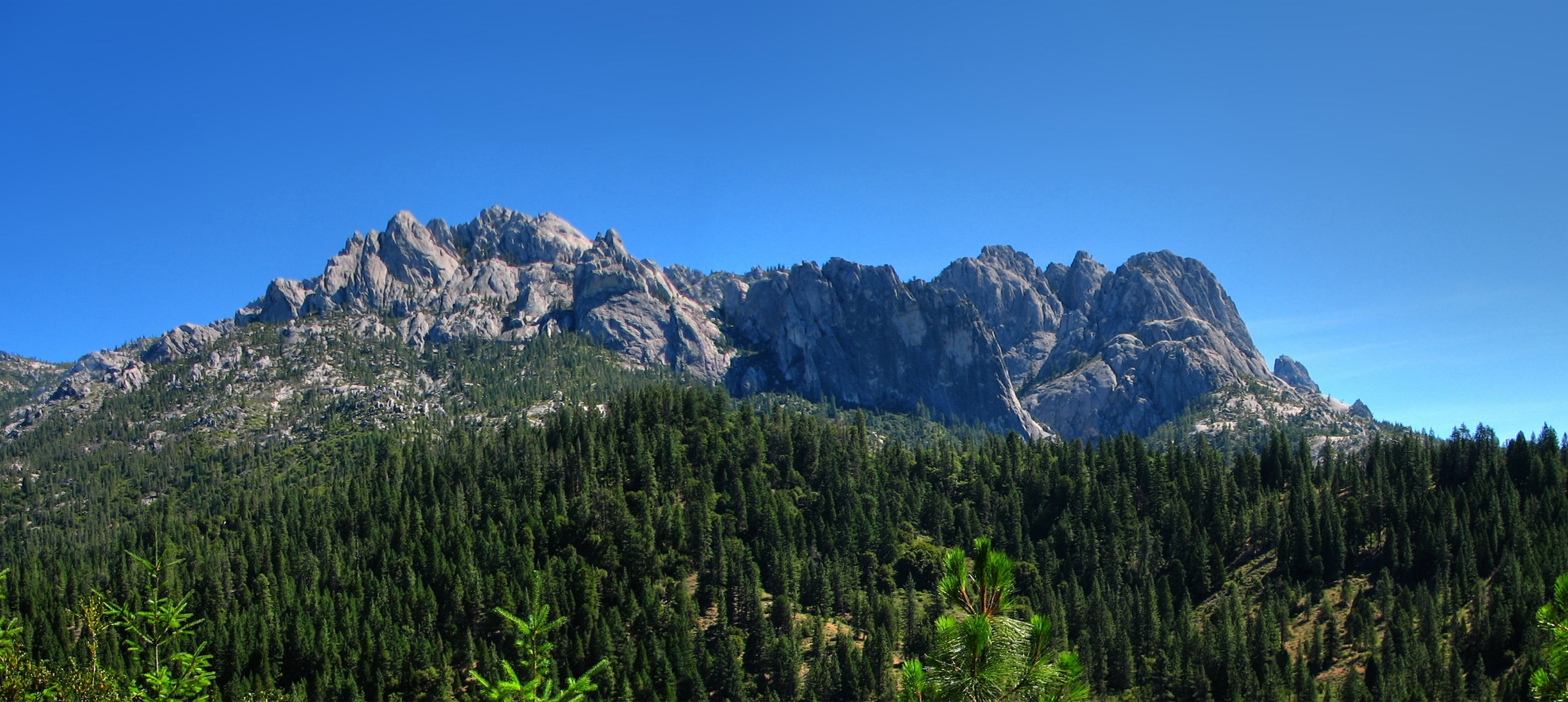
- Castle Crags view from the state park

- Location within California Location within the United States
- Interactive map of Castle Crags Wilderness
- Location: Trinity Mountains, Shasta-Trinity National Forest, Siskiyou and Shasta Counties, California
- Nearest city: Mount Shasta City
- Coordinates: 41°12′00″N 122°22′50″W
- Area: 10,500 acres (42 km^{2}; 16.4 mi^{2})
- Established: 1984
- Governing body: U.S. Forest Service

The Castle Crags Wilderness is a 12,232-acre (49.50 km^{2}; 19.113 mi^{2}) wilderness area in the Castle Crags rock formations of the Trinity Mountains, and within the Shasta-Trinity National Forest, in northwestern California. It is located in Siskiyou County and Shasta County, 40 miles (64 km) north of Redding and south of Mount Shasta City.

The US Congress passed the California Wilderness Act in 1984 which set aside the wilderness.

== Geography ==
Elevations of the Castle Crags range from 2,500–7,300 feet (762–2,225 m). The Trinity Mountains are a range in the Klamath Mountains System and the Klamath geological province.

The prominent spires in the southeast that make up the Castle Crags are the main attraction and are similar to the granitic rock landscape in parts of Yosemite National Park. In the northern portion of the wilderness, the landscape is more like the Klamath Mountains with glacial erosion, several cirques, and abundant rainfall with a high, east-trending divide. The area is bounded on the east by the Sacramento River, in the north by the South Fork Sacramento River and in the south by the canyon of Castle Creek and the boundary of Castle Crags State Park.

== History ==
One roadless area of 7 km^{2} (2.7 sq mi) borders on the northwest and contains the largest glacial cirque, Castle Lake, which is near where the Modoc War's 1855 Battle of Castle Crags took place. Now a historical landmark (California Historical Landmark No.16), the battle was fought on a ridge saddle between the lake and what is known as Battle Rock.

The Wintu Indians who inhabited the area called the crags the Abode of the Devil and the Spanish explorers called it Castle del Diablo (Castle of the Devil.)

There are mineral springs at the base of the crags which were used by the early fur traders, and after the Southern Pacific Railroad was completed into the area, health resorts sprang up as well. The railroad touted the beauty of the West to increase ridership, improve the West's image, and hopefully, sell some of its land holdings.

Sunset was a publication started in 1898 by the passenger department of the Southern Pacific Railroad Company that described various places in the West and was named after its Sunset Limited railroad line which went from New Orleans to San Francisco. The magazine's description of Castle Crags is the typical, flowery writing style of that era:

"These are peaks of a spur of the Trinity range, that rise abruptly in towers and pinnacles, splintered and riven in all manner of fantastic shapes. With every slight change in the position of the beholder they seem to march and countermarch, advance and recede, until one is ready to believe them moving."

The advent of logging and mining brought even more people to the area with some mining continuing until the 1950s.
In 1933, concerned citizens successfully worked to protect the area and were able to acquire much of the land that became the state park. President Reagan signed into law the California Wilderness Act in 1984 that protected another 42 square kilometers (16.4 square miles) and was added to the National Wilderness Preservation System.

== Flora and fauna ==
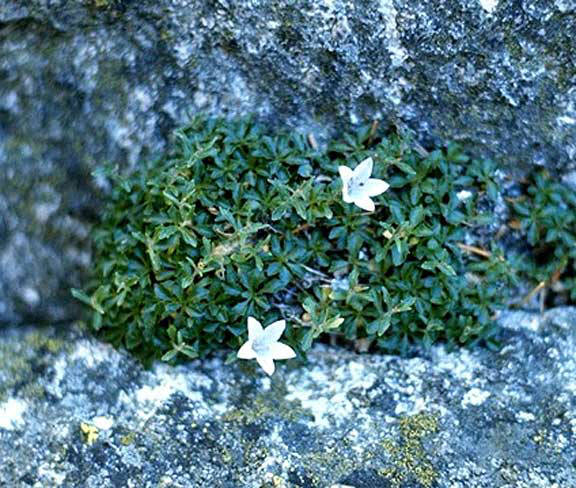
Endemic Castle Crags harebell.

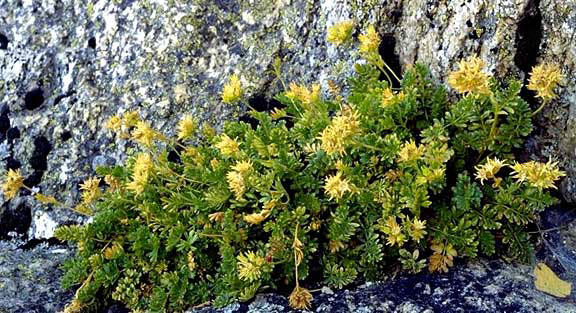
The ivesia plant. Note the granite ledge in background.

The wilderness contains more than 300 species of wildflowers, including the Castle Crags harebell and the Castle Crags ivesia, both endemic, as well as tiger lily, monkey flower, and Indian rhubarb. Drier locations have yarrow, aster and buckwheat. Forested areas have incense cedar, white fir, ponderosa pine, several types of oaks with Pacific dogwood and maple in riparian zones. Meadows and brushlands have various kinds of manzanita along with huckleberry oak, chaparral and mountain whitethorn. Poison oak is common, as are rattlesnakes—dictating caution when hiking the trails.

Black bears, coyotes, bobcats and mountain lions are some of the larger predators in this diverse habitat of bare granite, steep slopes, meadows and mountain streams.

== Recreation ==
The state park extends 480 acres (1.9 km^{2}) inside the wilderness and has five of the nine trailheads. The Pacific Crest Trail (PCT) traverses the wilderness for 19 miles (31 km) with several spur trails connecting from the park to the PCT.

The Castle Dome Trail is a strenuous hiking trail into the crags proper and passes near Indian Springs, a natural hillside spring with views of the crags. The trail ends after 2.7 miles (4.3 km) at a notch just west of Castle Dome (4,829 feet (1,472 m)), the southernmost of the crags, providing an unobstructed view of Mount Shasta and the spires, buttresses, sheer cliffs and domes of the Castle Crags.

Rock climbing opportunities range from Class 5 to Class 5.13a in difficulty, and although the granite rocks are massive, some areas are unstable because of exfoliation (flaking layers of loose rock).

The Forest Service encourages the use of Leave No Trace principles of outdoor travel to minimize impact to the environment.

== See also ==
- Trinity Mountains topics
- Flora of the Klamath Mountains
