= Castella, California =

Unincorporated community in California, United States

- Unincorporated community Census-designated place
- Location in California Castella, California (the United States)
- Coordinates: 41°9′19.73″N 122°17′33.13″W
- Country: United States
- State: California
- County: Shasta

Area
  - Total: 1.186 sq mi (3.07 km^{2})
  - Land: 1.119 sq mi (2.90 km^{2})
  - Water: 0.067 sq mi (0.17 km^{2})
- Elevation: 2,097 ft (639 m)

Population (2020)
  - Total: 214
  - Density: 191/sq mi (73.8/km^{2})
- Time zone: UTC-8 (Pacific)
  - Summer (DST): UTC-7 (PDT)
- GNIS feature ID: 2813347

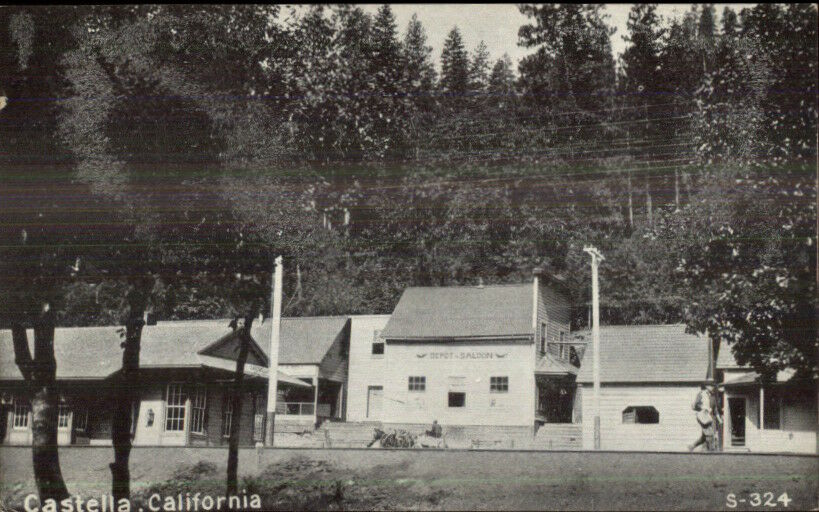
A circa-1910 postcard of Castella, with the Southern Pacific Railroad station at left

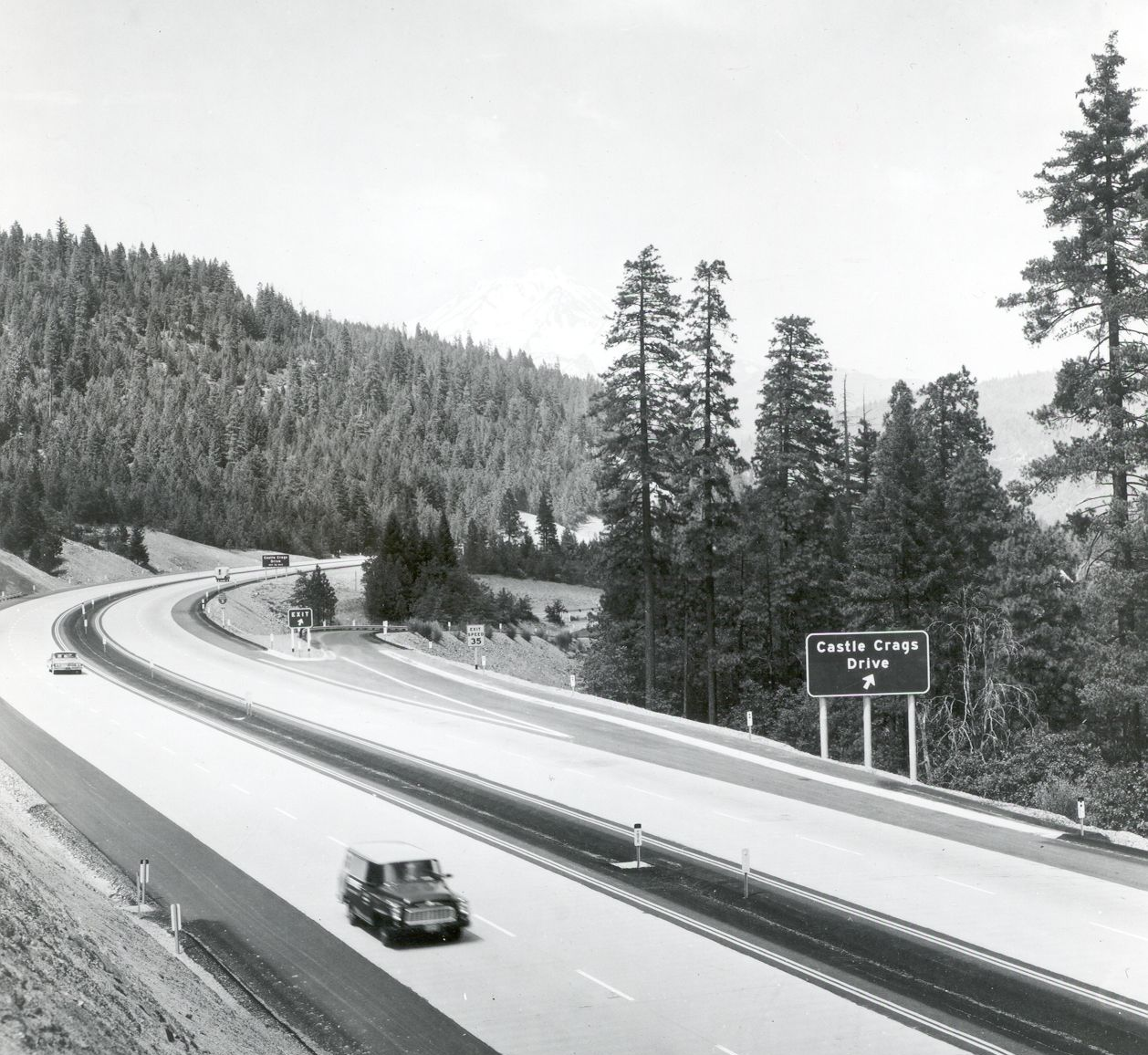
Interstate 5 exit at Castella, 1963

Castella is an unincorporated community and census-designated place (CDP) in the upper Sacramento Canyon of Shasta County, California, United States. It is located 46 miles north of Redding on Interstate 5 and is home to Castle Crags State Park. Its population is 214 as of the 2020 census. It has a Chevron gas station/store and a post office. The ZIP Code is 96017. The community is served by area code 530.

== Commerce and tourism ==
Located in the Shasta Cascade area of Northern California, Castella sees many visitors and has a number of summer homes in the area. Visitors use Castella as a base to engage in nationally recognized trout fishing in the nearby Sacramento McCloud and Klamath, Rivers, or come to see and climb Mount Shasta, Castle Crags or the Trinity Alps. Visitors also engage in nearby skiing (both alpine and cross-country), or bike or hike to the waterfalls, streams and lakes in the area, including nearby Mossbrae Falls, Lake Siskiyou, Castle Lake and Shasta Lake.

== Politics ==
In the state legislature Castella is located in the 1st Senate District, represented by Republican Ted Gaines, and in the 1st Assembly District, represented by Republican Brian Dahle.

Federally, Castella is in California's 1st congressional district, represented by Republican James Gallagher.

== Demographics ==
Historical population
| Census | Pop. | Note | %± |
|---|---|---|---|
| 2020 | 214 | | — |
U.S. Decennial Census; 1850–1870 1880-1890; 1900 1910 1920; 1930 1940 1950; 1960 1970 1980; 1990 2000 2010

Castella first appeared as a census designated place in the 2020 U.S. census.

=== 2020 census ===
As of the 2020 census, Castella had a population of 214. The median age was 53.5 years. 12.6% of residents were under the age of 18 and 28.0% of residents were 65 years of age or older. For every 100 females there were 101.9 males, and for every 100 females age 18 and over there were 101.1 males age 18 and over.

0.0% of residents lived in urban areas, while 100.0% lived in rural areas.

There were 103 households in Castella, of which 24.3% had children under the age of 18 living in them. Of all households, 44.7% were married-couple households, 10.7% were households with a male householder and no spouse or partner present, and 33.0% were households with a female householder and no spouse or partner present. About 28.2% of all households were made up of individuals and 16.6% had someone living alone who was 65 years of age or older.

There were 199 housing units, of which 48.2% were vacant. The homeowner vacancy rate was 3.9% and the rental vacancy rate was 13.9%.

Castella CDP, California – Racial and ethnic composition Note: the US Census treats Hispanic/Latino as an ethnic category. This table excludes Latinos from the racial categories and assigns them to a separate category. Hispanics/Latinos may be of any race.
| Race / Ethnicity (NH = Non-Hispanic) | Pop 2020 | % 2020 |
|---|---|---|
| White alone (NH) | 182 | 85.05% |
| Black or African American alone (NH) | 2 | 0.93% |
| Native American or Alaska Native alone (NH) | 2 | 0.93% |
| Asian alone (NH) | 1 | 0.47% |
| Pacific Islander alone (NH) | 0 | 0.00% |
| Some Other Race alone (NH) | 3 | 1.40% |
| Mixed Race or Multi-Racial (NH) | 8 | 3.74% |
| Hispanic or Latino (any race) | 16 | 7.48% |
| Total | 214 | 100.00% |
