= Chanchelulla Wilderness =

Protected wilderness area in California, United States

- IUCN category Ib (wilderness area)
- Location within California Location within the United States
- Location: Trinity County, California, United States
- Nearest city: Hayfork, California
- Coordinates: 40.4729642°N 122.9931668°W
- Area: 8,062 acres (3,263 ha; 33 km^{2}; 13 mi^{2})
- Established: 1984
- Governing body: United States Forest Service

Chanchelulla Wilderness is a 12.6-square-mile (32.6-square-kilometer) wilderness area under the jurisdiction of the Shasta-Trinity National Forest in the U.S. state of California. Established in 1984, the Wilderness is centered around Chanchelulla Peak standing at 6,399 feet (1,950 m). The southern slopes are covered in thickets of chaparral while the northern slopes hold pockets of pine, fir, and cedar. Wildlife in the area include deer, American black bears, fishers, North American cougars, birds of prey, owls (including northern spotted owls), and numerous songbirds.

== See also ==
- List of U.S. Wilderness Areas
