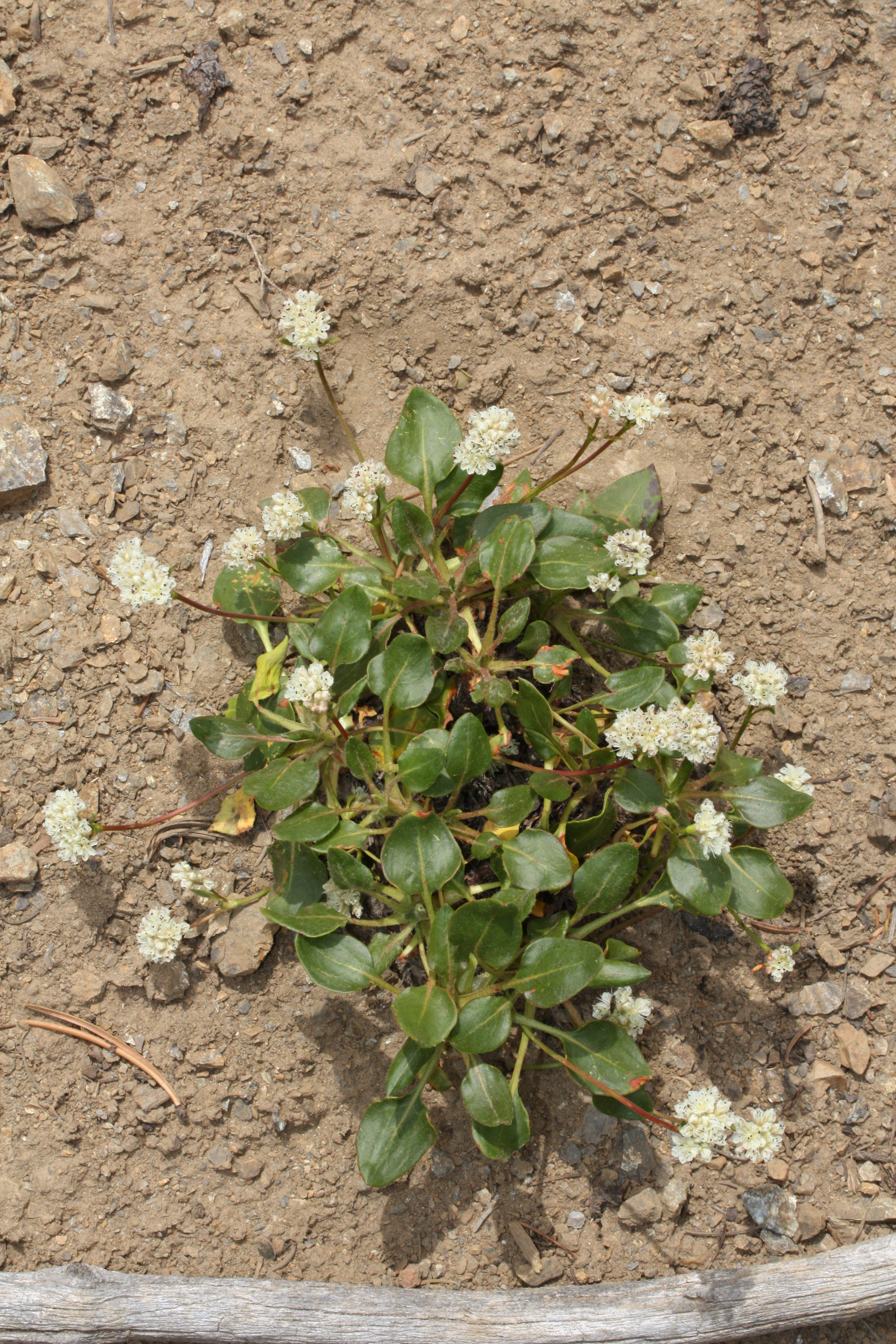
- Eriogonum pyrolifolium (Wenatchee Mountains)

Scientific classification
- Kingdom: Plantae
- Clade: Tracheophytes
- Clade: Angiosperms
- Clade: Eudicots
- Order: Caryophyllales
- Family: Polygonaceae
- Genus: Eriogonum
- Species: E. pyrolifolium

Binomial name
- Eriogonum pyrolifolium Hook.

= Eriogonum pyrolifolium =

Species of wild buckwheat

Eriogonum pyrolifolium (Shasta buckwheat, pyrola-leafed buckwheat, alpine buckwheat, alpine eriogonum, oarleaf buckwheat, or dirty socks) is a species of wild buckwheat. It is native to western North America, from British Columbia to the high mountains of California.

== Description ==
This is a small woody perennial reaching a maximum height and width of about 20 centimeters, including its inflorescence. Its rounded or spade-shaped, woolly (sometimes glabrous), petioled leaves are located at the base of the plant; their resemblance to the leaves of wintergreens (genus Pyrola) gives the species its name. The wool on the leaves and petioles sometimes has a pronounced orange color. Clusters of flowers appear on stalks which may be erect or bend to the ground. The small hairy flowers are greenish-white or white to pink. At certain times during growth and blossoming this plant will emit an odor similar to sweaty, unwashed socks.

== Habitat ==
Eriogonum pyrolifolium often grows on nearly barren dry rocky soil in sub-alpine and alpine locations, including extensive pumice and tephra slopes on Mount Rainier and other Cascade range volcanoes.

== Gallery ==
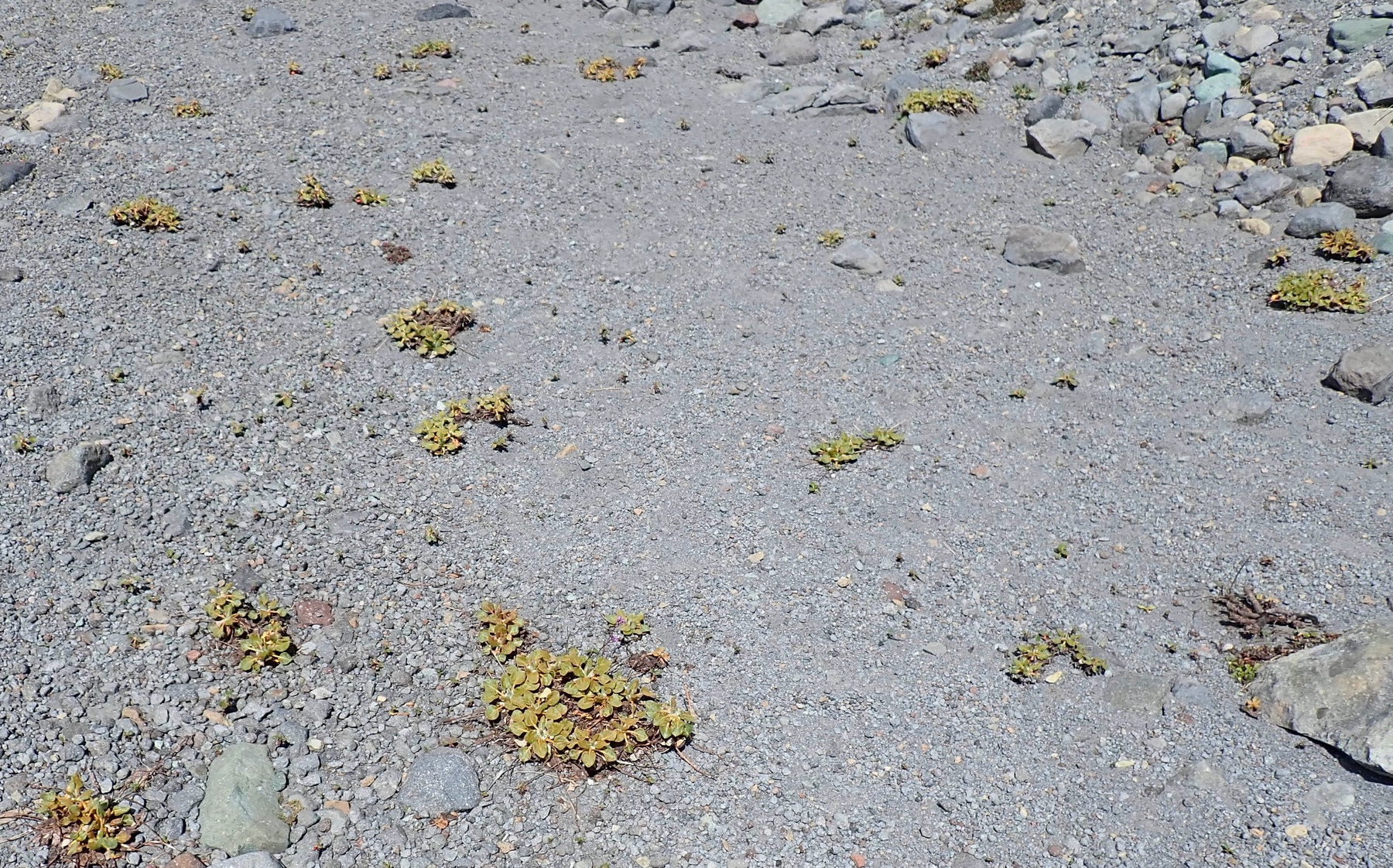
Only plant locally on gravel, Mount Rainier

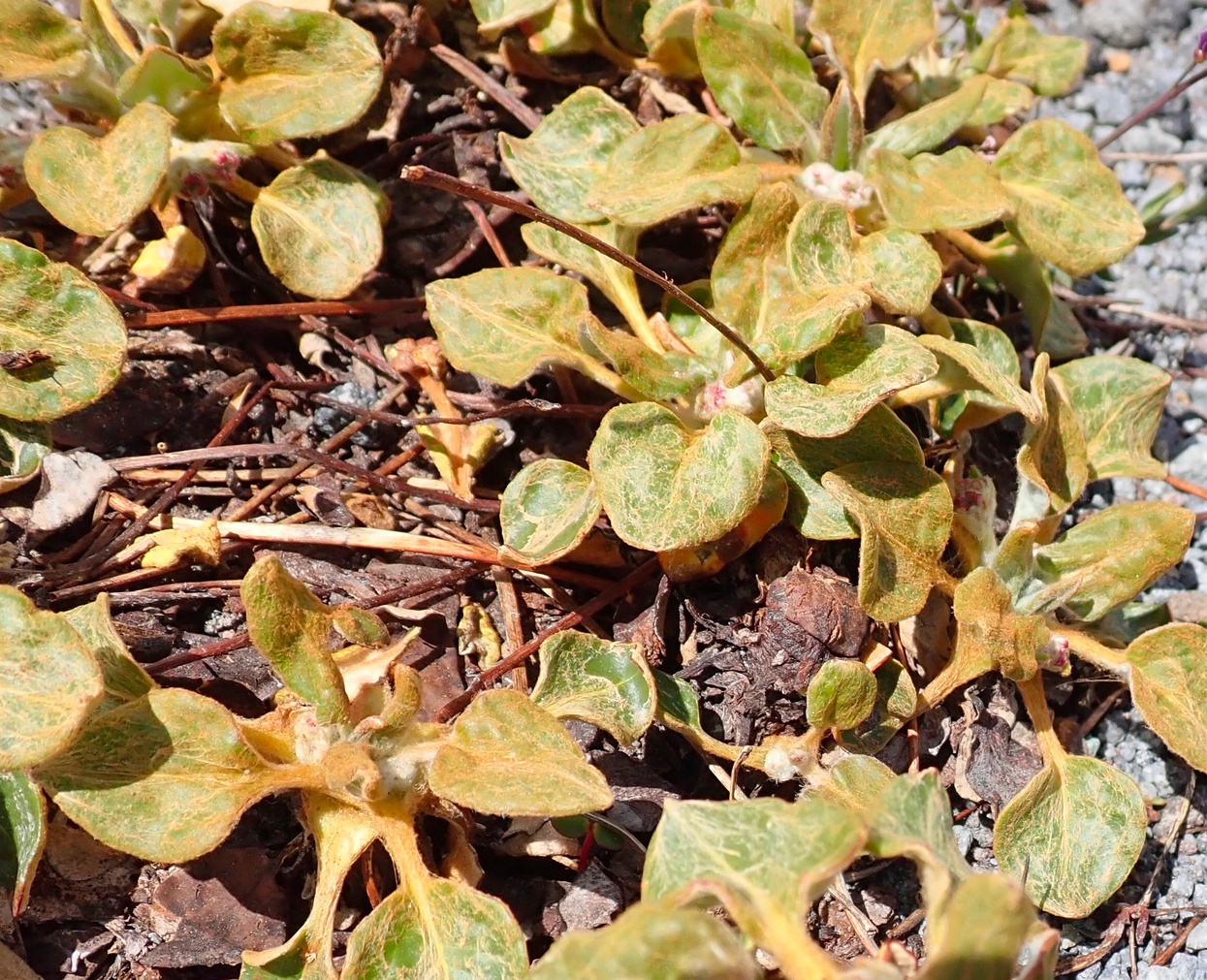
Orange wooly form

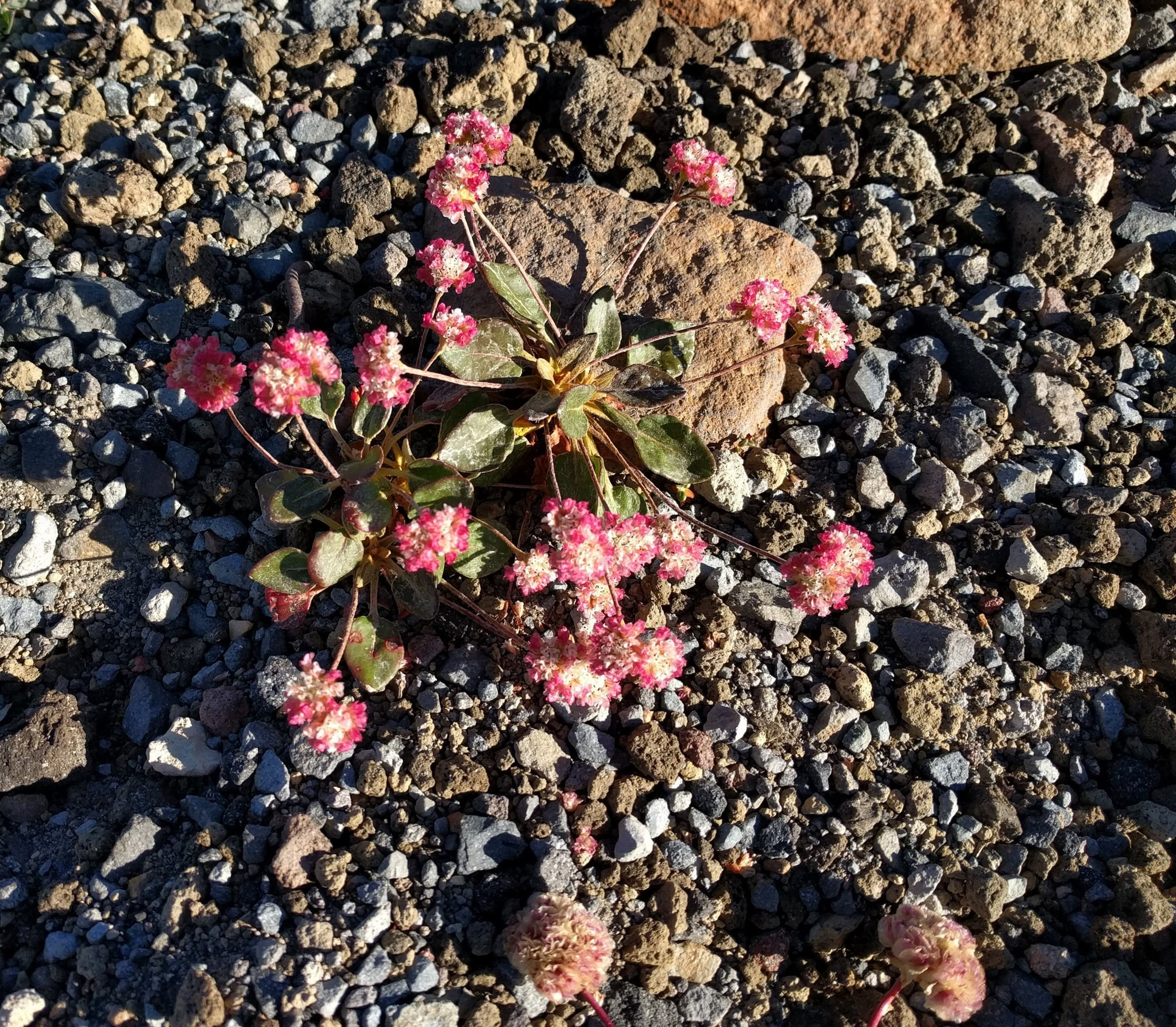
Dark pink flower form
