= Castle Crags =

Rock formation in California, United States

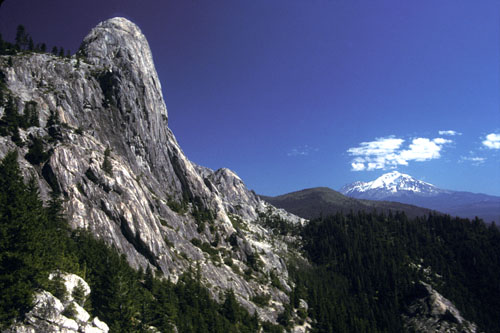
- Castle Dome, a popular trail destination at Castle Crags (left foreground). Mount Shasta can also be seen (distant right).

- Location within California Location within the United States
- Location: Shasta County, California
- Nearest city: Castella
- Coordinates: 41°10′32″N 122°20′22″W
- Governing body: California Department of Parks and Recreation

Castle Crags is a dramatic and well-known rock formation in Northern California. Elevations range from 2,000 feet (610 m) along the Sacramento River near the base of the crags, to over 6,500 feet (2,000 m) at the summit of the tallest crag.

Located just west of Interstate 5, between the towns of Castella and Dunsmuir, Castle Crags is today a popular tourist stop along the highway. Mount Shasta is 10 miles to the north.

The formation and surrounding habitats are protected by Castle Crags State Park, located on both sides of Interstate 5 at them, and by Castle Crags Wilderness Area of the Shasta-Trinity National Forest.

== Geology ==
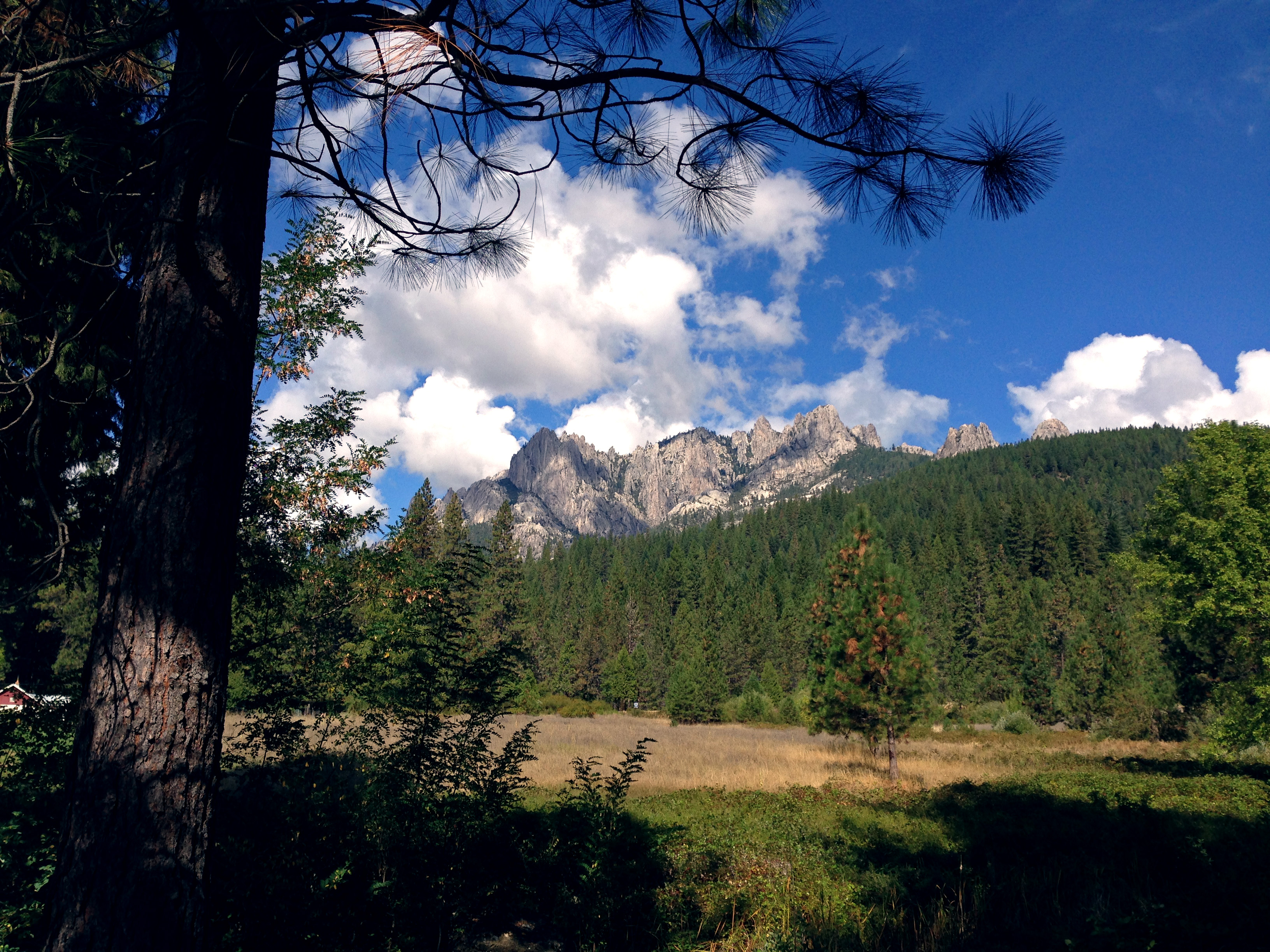
Seen from Interstate 5

Although the Northern Coast Ranges of northwestern California consist largely of rocks of volcanic and sedimentary origin, granite bodies (plutons) intruded many parts of the area during the Jurassic period. Heavy glaciation at this location during the Pleistocene eroded much of the softer surrounding rock leaving the towering crags and spires exposed, from which the Castle Crags pluton derives its name. Exfoliation of huge, convex slabs of granite yielded rounded forms such as the prominent Castle Dome feature of Castle Crags.

== History ==
Situated along an ancient trade and travel route known as the Siskiyou Trail, Castle Crags has witnessed dramatic events. Strained relationships between 1850s California Gold Rush miners and the local native Indian populations resulted in the 1855 Battle of Castle Crags, in which the poet Joaquin Miller was wounded, and which he later described in an essay of the same name.

Exploitation of the land by lumber and mining operations encouraged concerned citizens in 1933 to acquire much of the land which would eventually become Castle Crags State Park. However much of the crags themselves are part of the Castle Crags Wilderness Area within the Shasta-Trinity National Forest, managed by the U.S. Forest Service.

The forested area of Castle Crags State Park was used by several native groups. The wilderness was the ancestral home to the Okwanuchu Shasta people. The Crags were also revered by the Indigenous people surrounding them including the Wintu, Achumawi and Modoc people. Many features of the Castle Crags Wilderness are considered sacred to Native Americans including all of the streams, the Sacramento River, and the region's abundance of natural springs.

During the 1848 California Gold Rush, miners flocked to California from all over the world, invading the original homelands and destroying the life-sustaining resources and environments of the native people. Thousands of miners invaded the Castle Crags Wilderness when false rumors of the fabled "Lost Cabin Mine" began to circulate in the region. This invasion led to the genocide, slavery and forcible displacement of Indigenous people. Joaquin Miller wrote about the atrocities committed on the region's native populations during the 1855 Battle of Castle Crags, in one instance describing in detail a massacre of Native American women, children and infants who were ambushed by a mob of drunken settlers while they slept. More than two-thirds of the native California Indian people died as a result of the conquest, with its gruesome violence and contagious diseases—among them, many Okwanuchu Shasta, Wintu and Modoc people from this area.

Native Americans utilized a natural mineral spring in the Castle Crags Wilderness which is known today as Castle Rock Mineral Spring, and is situated on the edge of the Sacramento River inside of Castle Crags State Park. The mineral spring is supported within a rock-built enclosure which was constructed by the Civilian Conservation Corps back in the 1930s. Today it still has a sulfuric smell and bubbles up from the ground. The natural mineral waters are widely reputed to have restorative, healing, medicinal and therapeutic properties.

The massacre of Indigenous people from the Castle Crags Wilderness opened up the region for commercial and industrial exploitation of the land's resources, which are sacred to native people. The Castle Rock Mineral Spring was one of the earliest land resources seized after a genocidal campaign that eliminated Native Americans from this region. During the 1890s, the Castle Rock Mineral Springs Bottling Works was formed, and cases of the mineral water were bottled, sold and shipped all over the world to prestigious clients.

=== Castle Rock Water Company ===
Castle Rock Water Company
- Founded: 1889
- Defunct: 1929
- Fate: Bankruptcy
- Headquarters: Dunsmuir, California

Castle Rock Mineral Springs Bottling Works was founded in 1889 in Dunsmuir, California, United States. The company bottled natural spring water which was shipped all over the world.

George Washington Bailey operated a resort and a hotel across the river from the Castle Rock Mineral Springs. A footbridge provided convenient access for tourists from the hotel to the springs. People traveled from all over the nation to visit the resort and mineral springs, which were said to contain healing properties.

The company operated profitably until 1906, when the San Francisco earthquake ended its plans to further divide up and develop the area commercially. The company subsequently went bankrupt during the 1929 stock market crash.

In 1943 the State of California purchased 925 acres of the Castle Rock Springs property, which was the beginning of Castle Crags State Park.

Flora

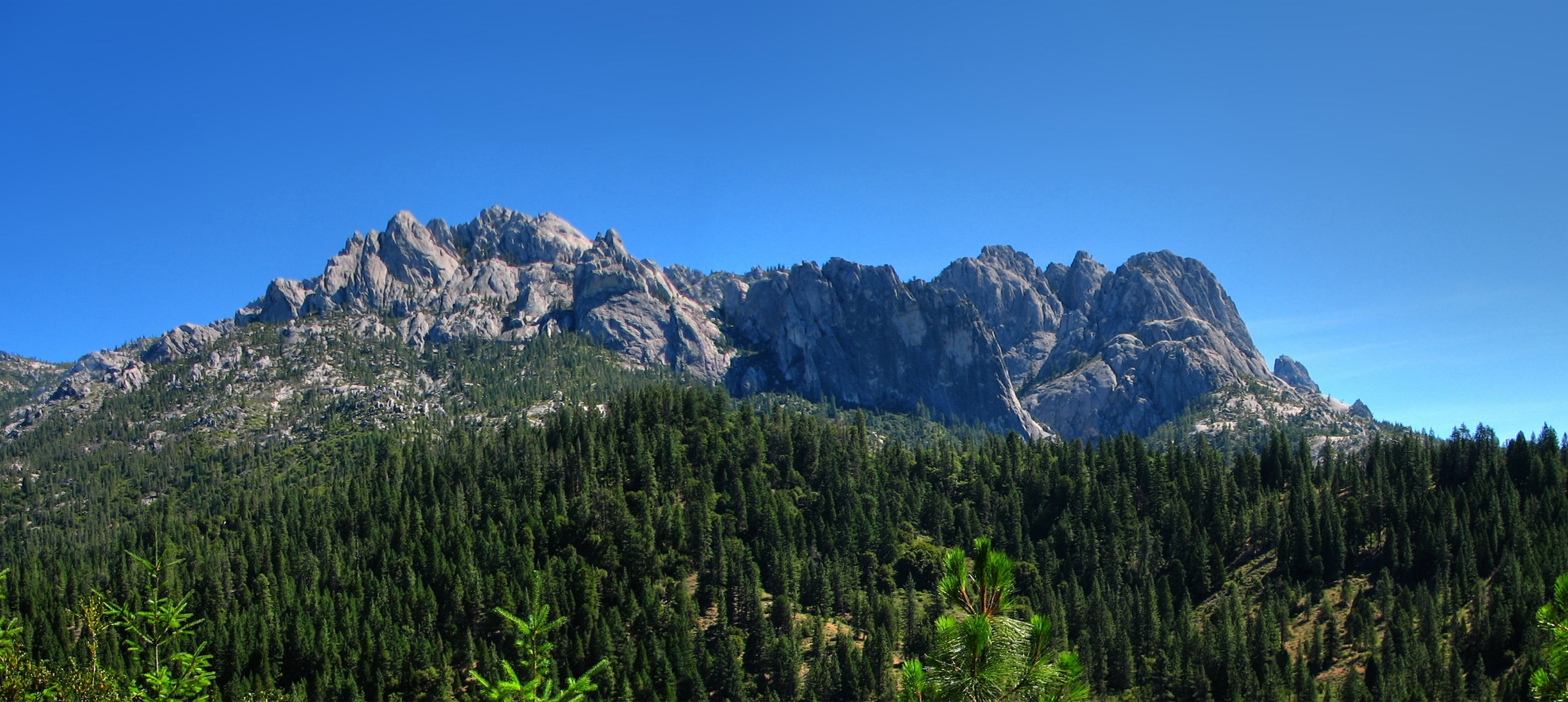
A panoramic view of Castle Crags from inside Castle Crags State Park

Two native species of plants which are endemic to Castle Crags are:

- Castle Crags ivesia (Ivesia longibracteata)
- Castle Crags bellflower (Campanula shetleri)

== See also ==
- Dunsmuir, California
- Castle Crags Wilderness
