= Castilleja arachnoidea =

Conservation status
- Vulnerable (NatureServe)

Scientific classification
- Kingdom: Plantae
- Clade: Tracheophytes
- Clade: Angiosperms
- Clade: Eudicots
- Clade: Asterids
- Order: Lamiales
- Family: Orobanchaceae
- Genus: Castilleja
- Species: C. arachnoidea

Binomial name
- Castilleja arachnoidea Greenm.

Synonyms
- Castilleja filifolia Castilleja payneae

Species of flowering plant

Castilleja arachnoidea is a species of paintbrush known by the common name cobwebby paintbrush or cobwebby Indian paintbrush.

It is native to northern California and Nevada and central and southern Oregon, where it is a resident of the local mountain ranges and the Modoc Plateau. This is a small woolly perennial herb growing up to about 30 centimeters in maximum height. Its narrow, pointed leaves are a few centimeters long and may be lobed. The inflorescence is coated in cobwebby fibers. The bracts are yellow to dull red, and the pouch-like flowers which emerge between them are greenish-yellow to purplish-red in color. The fruit is a capsule about a centimeter long.
