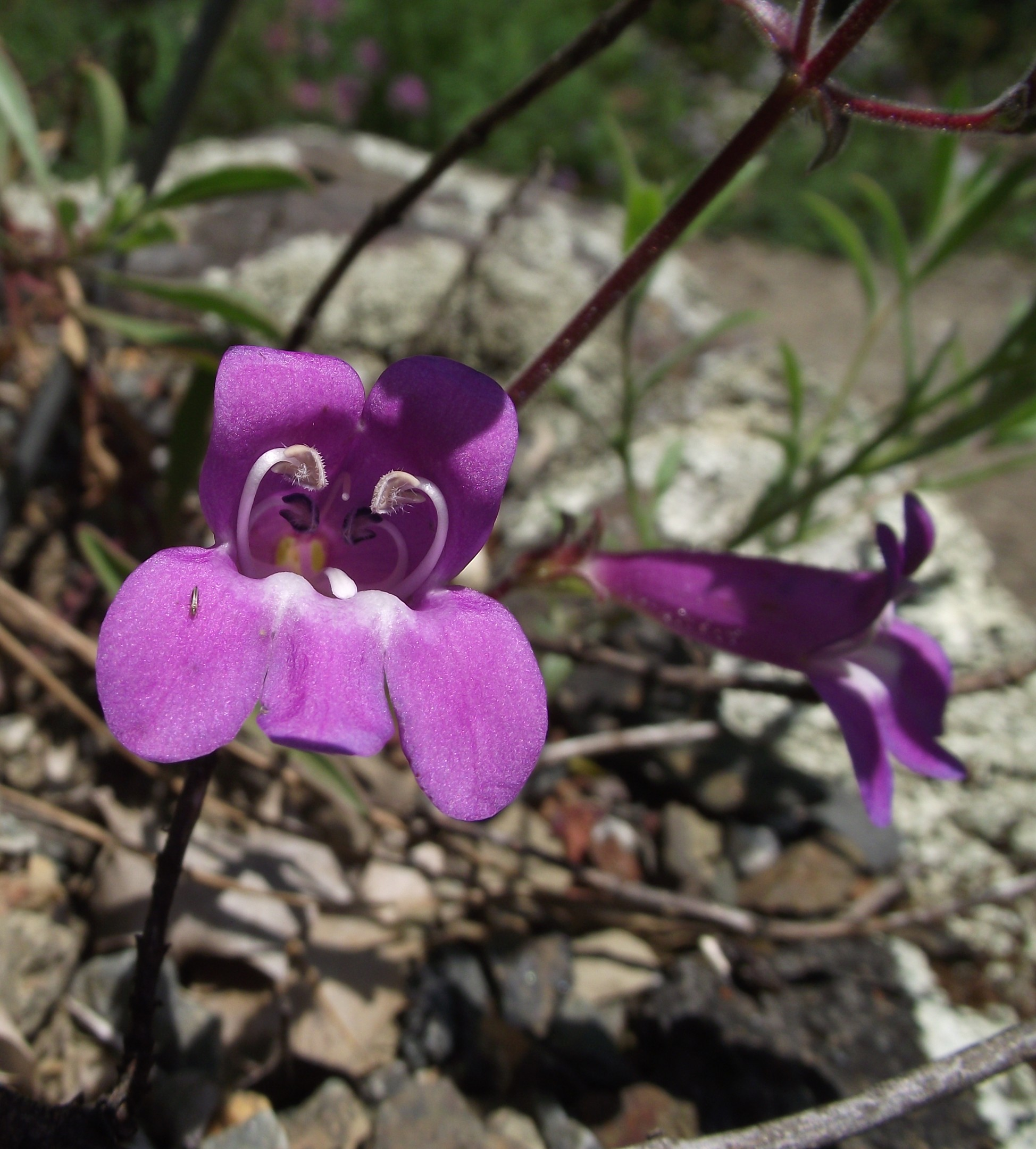

Conservation status
- Secure (NatureServe)

Scientific classification
- Kingdom: Plantae
- Clade: Tracheophytes
- Clade: Angiosperms
- Clade: Eudicots
- Clade: Asterids
- Order: Lamiales
- Family: Plantaginaceae
- Genus: Penstemon
- Species: P. laetus

Binomial name
- Penstemon laetus A.Gray

= Penstemon laetus =

Species of flowering plant

Penstemon laetus is a species of penstemon known by the common names mountain blue penstemon and gay penstemon. It is native to the inland mountains of Oregon and California, where its distribution extends from the Klamath Mountains through the Sierra Nevada to the Transverse Ranges. It grows in forest, scrub, and other local mountain habitat. It is a perennial herb growing erect to about 75 centimeters tall, its base becoming woody. The leaves are linear to lance-shaped and up to 10 centimeters long. The glandular inflorescence bears blue or purple flowers up to 3.5 centimeters long. The wide-mouthed tubular or funnel-shaped flower is glandular on the outer surface and mostly hairless on the inside.
