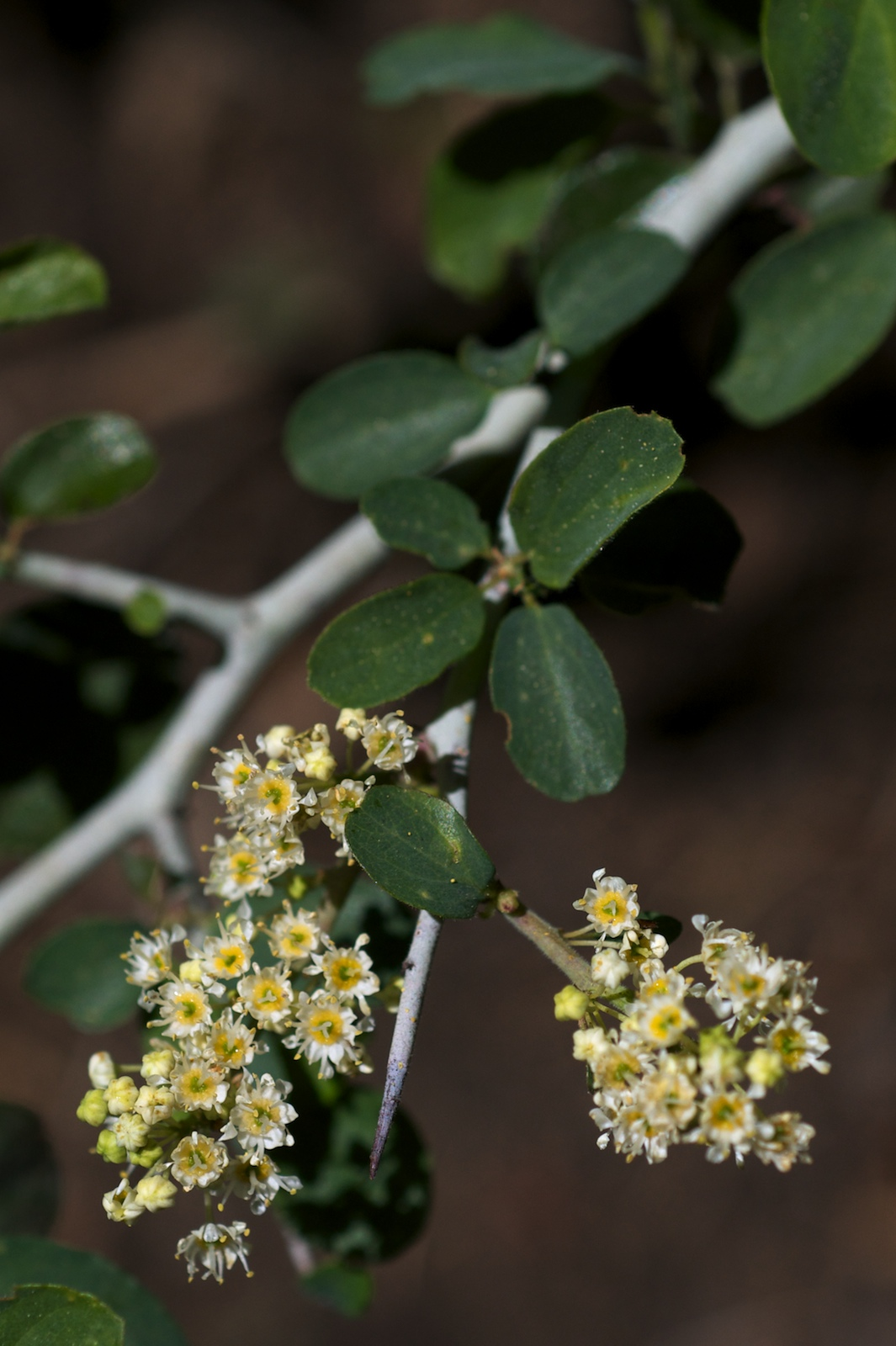

Scientific classification
- Kingdom: Plantae
- Clade: Tracheophytes
- Clade: Angiosperms
- Clade: Eudicots
- Clade: Rosids
- Order: Rosales
- Family: Rhamnaceae
- Genus: Ceanothus
- Species: C. cordulatus

Binomial name
- Ceanothus cordulatus Kellogg

= Ceanothus cordulatus =

Species of flowering plant

Ceanothus cordulatus is a species of shrub in the family Rhamnaceae known by the common names mountain whitethorn and whitethorn ceanothus. It is native to California and adjacent sections of Oregon, Nevada, and Baja California, where it grows on mountain ridges and other forested areas. This is a spreading shrub growing usually wider than tall and up to about 1.5 meters. The stems are gray, with the twigs yellow-green in color and fuzzy in texture when new. The evergreen leaves are alternately arranged and up to 3 centimeters long. Each is oval in shape with three ribs and generally not toothed. The leaves may be hairy or not. The inflorescence is panicle-shaped, up to about 4 centimeters long. The flowers are white to off-white with five sepals and five petals. The fruit is a rough, ridged capsule up to half a centimeter long. It has three valves inside, each containing a seed. It is a nitrogen-fixing plant, that is uniquely abundant in old-growth forest conditions when compared to similar types of nitrogen-fixing plants. In addition, Ceanothus cordulatus is known to be an important source of nitrogen patches for significantly longer times than other similar post-disturbance successional shrubs, following disturbance events such as forest fires.

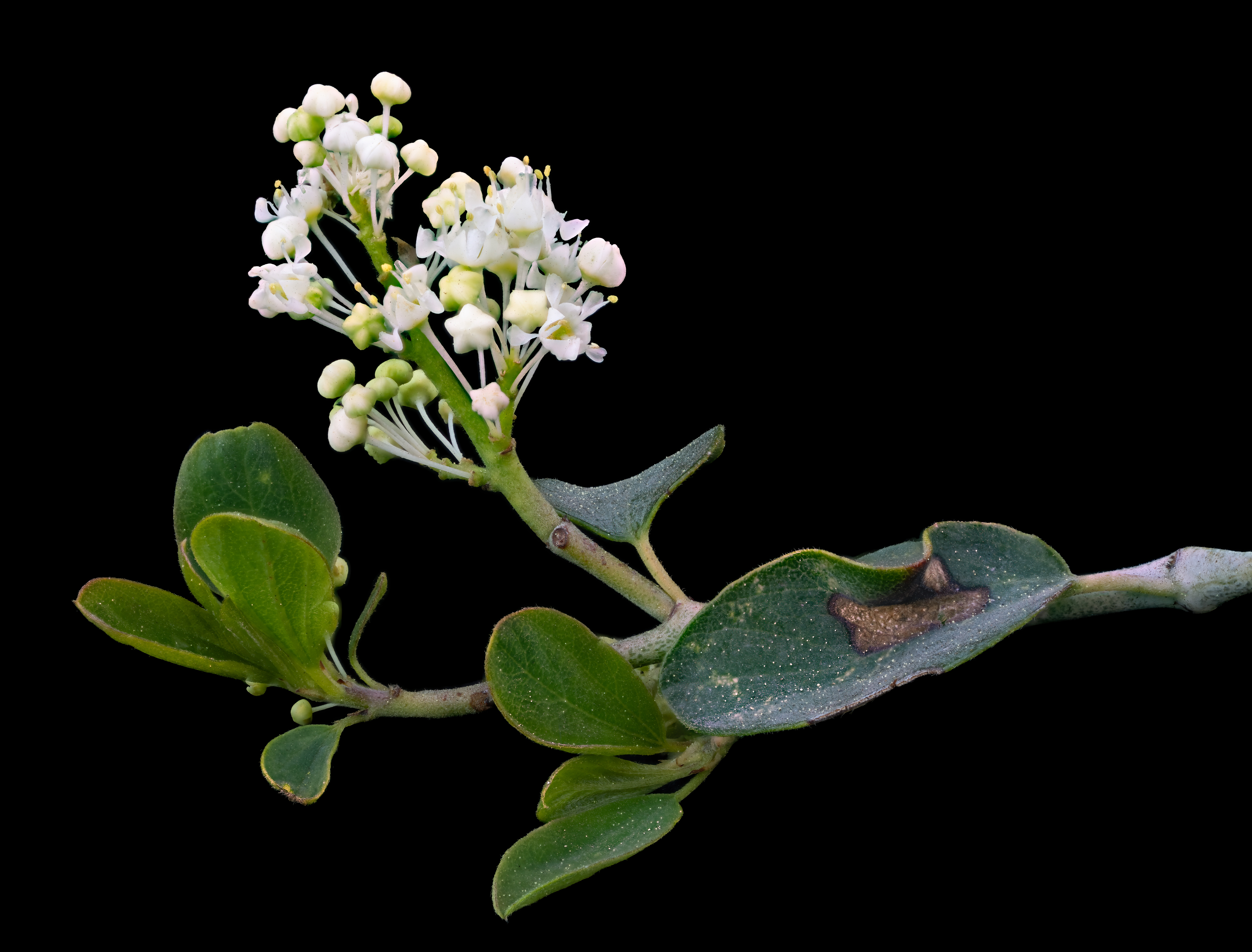
Ceanothus cordulatus
