= Shasta–Trinity National Forest =

National forest in California, US

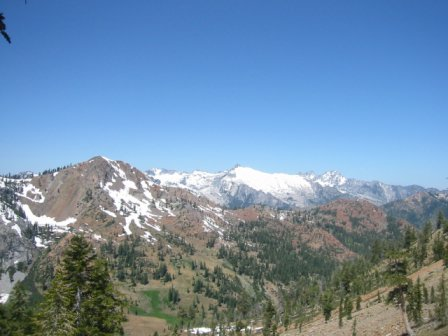
- Trinity Alps near Granite Lake
- Interactive map of Shasta–Trinity National Forest
- Location: Northern California
- Nearest city: Redding, California
- Coordinates: 40°44′07″N 122°56′31″W
- Area: 2,209,832 acres (8,942.87 km^{2}; 3,452.863 mi^{2})
- Established: 1954
- Governing body: U.S. Forest Service
- Website: Shasta-Trinity National Forest

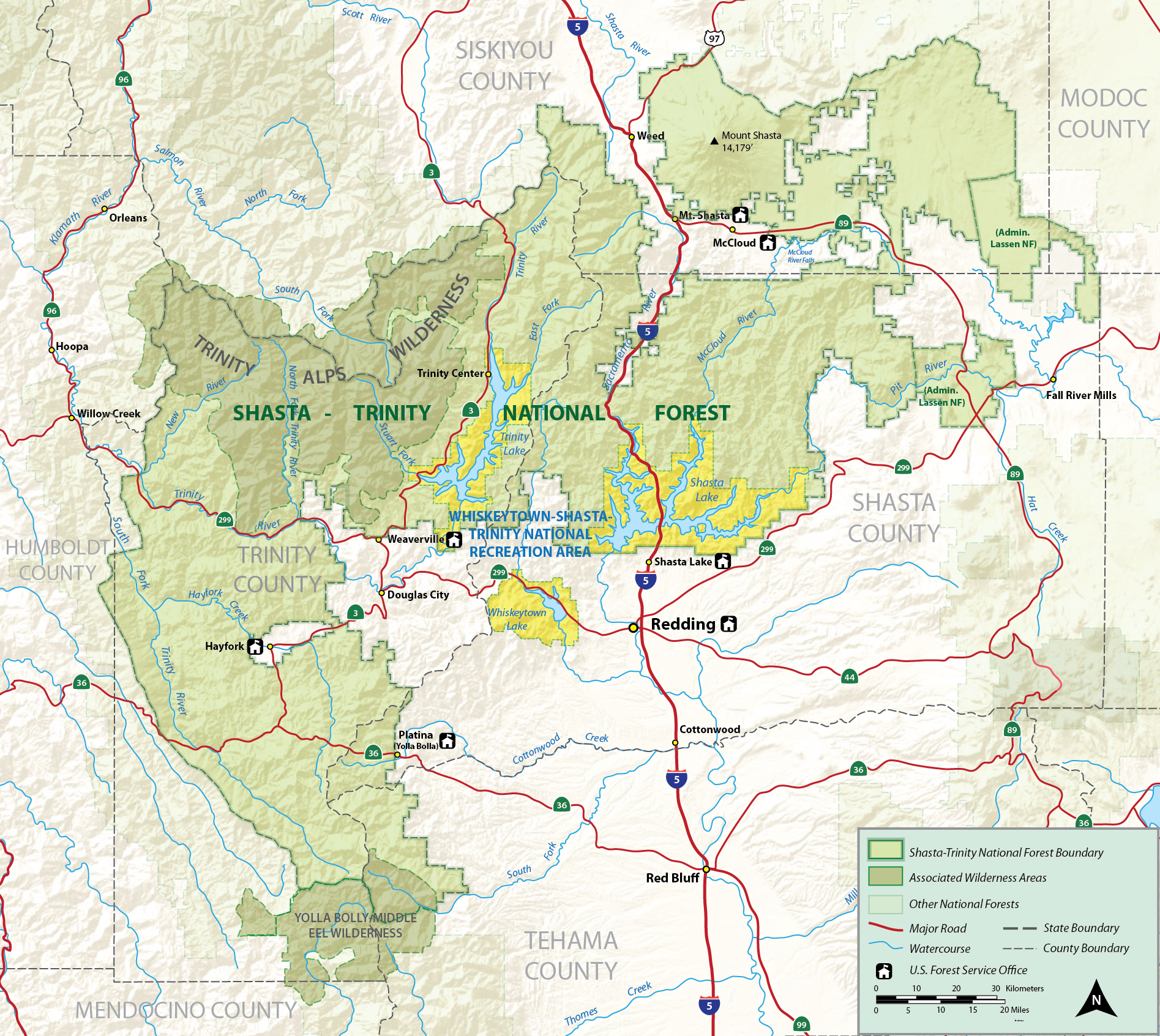
Map of the Shasta-Trinity National Forest and Whiskeytown–Shasta–Trinity National Recreation Area.

The Shasta–Trinity National Forest is a federally designated forest in northern California, United States. It is the largest National Forest in California and is managed by the U.S. Forest Service. The 3,454-square-mile (8,945.5-square-kilometer) forest encompasses five wilderness areas, hundreds of mountain lakes and 6,278 miles (10,103 km) of streams and rivers. Major features include Shasta Lake, the largest man-made lake in California and Mount Shasta, elevation 14,179 feet (4,322 m).

The Shasta–Trinity National Forest offers a wide range of recreational activities. Some of these include hiking, backpacking, mountain climbing, horseback riding, camping, boating, fishing, hunting, sightseeing, downhill skiing and riding, snowboarding, cross-country skiing, and snowmobiling.

In descending order of land area, the forests are located in parts of Trinity, Shasta, Siskiyou, Tehama, Modoc and Humboldt counties.

== History ==
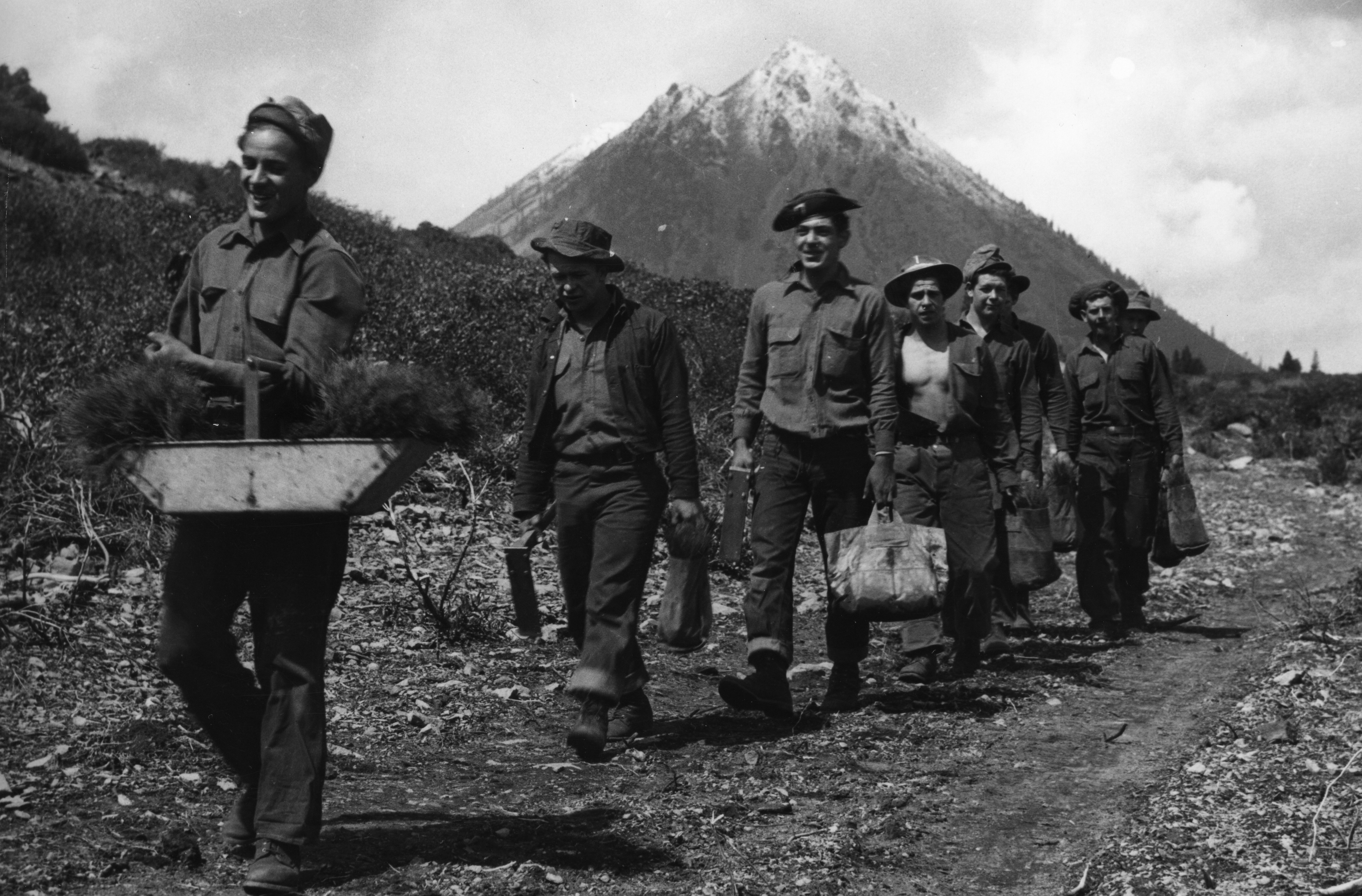
Civilian Conservation Corps enrollees carrying transplants to the fields, Shasta National Forest, 1930s

In 1905, the first timber sale under the new US Forest Service agency occurred on what was then called the Shasta Reserve. The Shasta National Forest (est.1905) and the Trinity National Forest (est.1905) were administratively combined in 1954. The new entity was officially renamed the Shasta–Trinity National Forest.

The Trinity National Forest is located in subranges of the Northern Inner California Coast Ranges and of the southeastern Klamath Mountains System, primarily in Trinity County, but also extending into parts of Tehama, Shasta, and Humboldt Counties. It covers an area of 1,631 mi^{2} (4,220 km^{2}).

The Shasta National Forest is located between the upper Sacramento Valley and the Shasta Valley to the north. It covers parts of Siskiyou, Shasta, Trinity, and Modoc Counties and has an area of 4,719.25 km^{2} (1,822.11 sq mi)

The site was managed by the National Park Service from 1945 to 1948.

== Wilderness areas ==
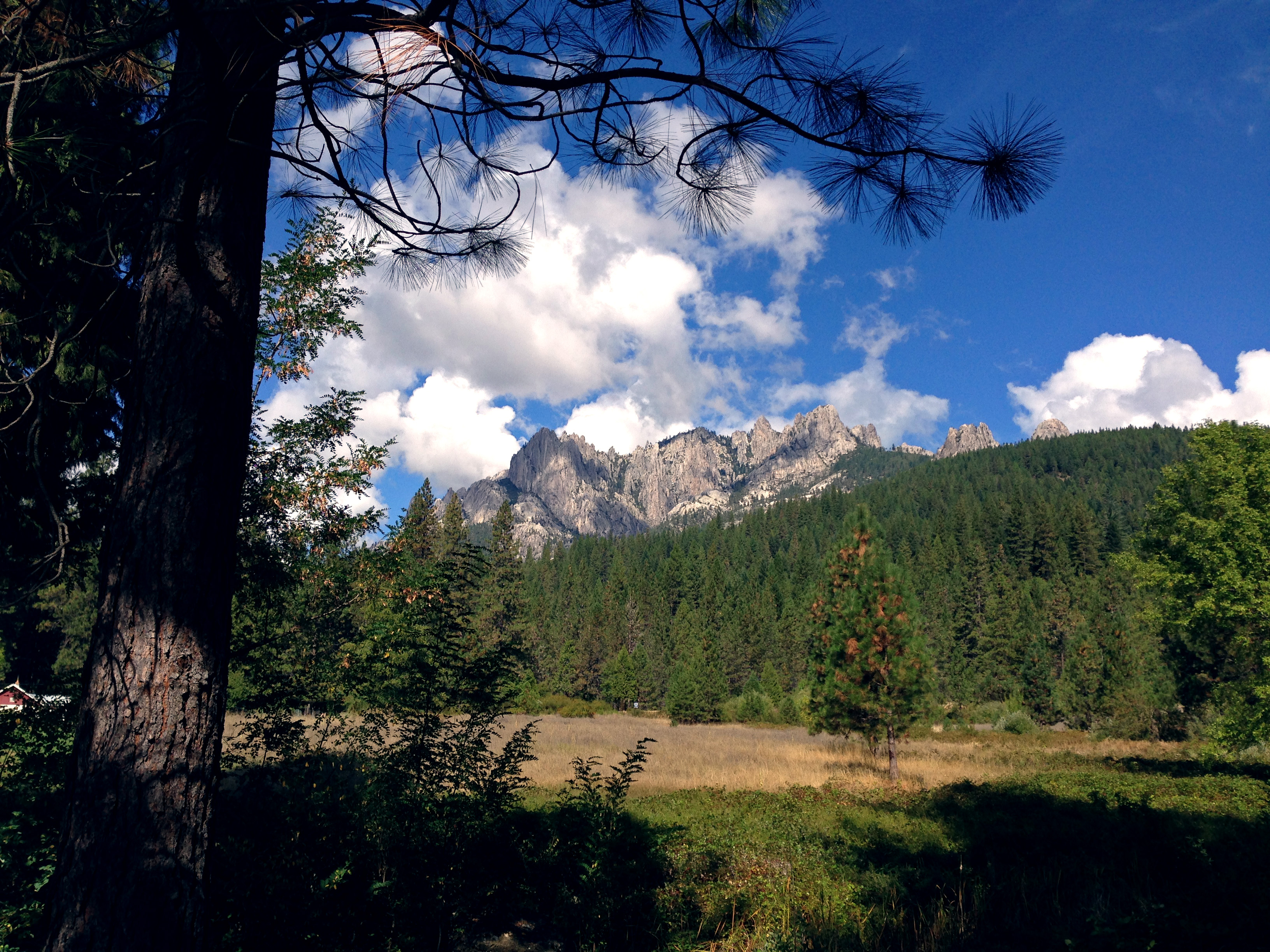
Castle Crags seen from Interstate 5

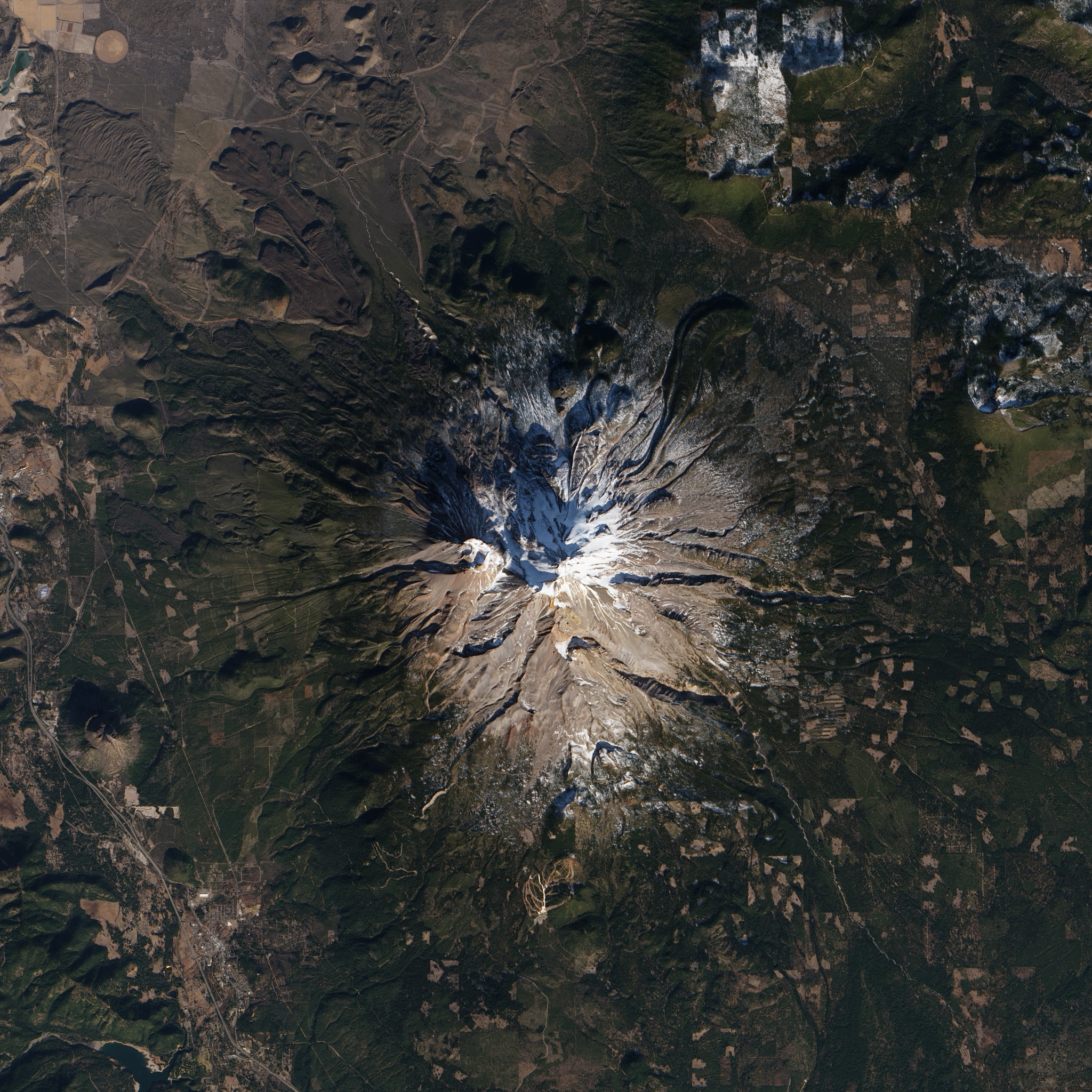
Mount Shasta

The forests include portions of five congressionally designated Wilderness Areas:

- Castle Crags Wilderness
- Chanchelulla Wilderness
- Mount Shasta Wilderness
- Trinity Alps Wilderness (partly in Klamath NF, Six Rivers NF, or Bureau of Land Management land)
- Yolla Bolly-Middle Eel Wilderness (partly in Mendocino NF, Six Rivers NF, or BLM land)

== Vegetation ==
The Shasta–Trinity Forest lies at the intersection of the Eastern Klamath Mountains and the Southern Cascades (Miles & Goudy, 1997). The land is largely forested, though at low elevations there are areas of chaparral, woodland, and grassland. At high elevations in the Trinity Alps, Eddys, and Mt. Shasta, forest gives way once again to montane chaparral, subalpine woodlands, and ultimately to alpine rock and scree.

Starting with lower elevations in the foothills around Shasta Lake, north of Redding, the forests and woodlands are dominated by gray pine, knobcone pine, ponderosa pine, blue oak, black oak, canyon live oak, Douglas fir, and white oak. Shrub diversity is very high. Common understory shrubs at lower elevations are whiteleaf manzanita, wedgeleaf ceanothus, California buckeye, California coffeeberry and western redbud.

In moist stream canyons, other trees and shrubs prevail—bigleaf maple, western spicebush (Calycanthus Occidentalis), dogwood, white alder, and willows.

At mid-elevations sugar pine, incense-cedar, white fir and Jeffrey pine join Douglas-fir, ponderosa pine, and canyon live oak, while the other pines and oaks drop out of the mix. Huckleberry oak, shrub tanoak, greenleaf and pinemat manzanitas, and bush chinquapin, are important understory components. In the Cascades east and north of Mt. Shasta, bitterbrush and tobacco brush are very common. On the serpentines of Trinity County's mid-elevation Klamath Mountains, incense-cedar and Jeffrey pine woodlands are inhabited by shrubby Congdon's silktassel, leather oak, and hoary manzanita. Farther west, on the long ridge of South Fork Mountain that divides the Shasta–Trinity and Six Rivers National Forests, the tree form of tanoak grows mixed with Douglas-fir and golden chinquapin.

Upper montane and subalpine forests in the Klamath Ranges are characterized by a mix of tree species including red fir, mountain hemlock, foxtail pine, and lodgepole pine. At higher elevations, Western white pine and whitebark pines dominate the landscape. Montane meadows and streamsides in this region boast a diverse flora featuring abundant California pitcherplant and western azalea. Occasionally, the Port-Orford-cedar can also be found here, distinct from its usual coastal habitats.

Much more detail on the vegetation zones of Mount Shasta, and their associated flora and fauna, can be found in C. Hart Merriam's important early biological survey, published in 1899.

Tree, shrub, and plant species of the Shasta–Trinity National Forests
Common name	Scientific name
white fir	Abies concolor
red fir	Abies magnifica
bigleaf maple	Acer macrophyllum
California buckeye	Aesculus californica
white alder	Alnus rhombifolia
hoary manzanita	Arctostaphylos canescens
pinemat manzanita	Arctostaphylos nevadensis
greenleaf manzanita	Arctostaphylos patula
whiteleaf manzanita	Arctostaphylos viscida
incense-cedar	Calocedrus decurrens
western spicebush	Calycanthus occidentalis
wedgeleaf ceanothus	Ceanothus cuneatus
tobacco brush	Ceanothus velutinus
western redbud	Cercis occidentalis
Port-Orford-cedar	Chamaecyparis lawsoniana
golden chinquapin	Chrysolepis chrysophylla
bush chinquapin	Chrysolepis sempervirens
dogwood	Cornus (several species)
California pitcherplant	Darlingtonia californica
Congdon's silk-tassel	Garrya congdonii
tree tanoak	Lithocarpus densiflorus var. densiflorus
shrub tanoak	Lithocarpus densiflorus var. echinoides
Whitebark pine	Pinus albicaulis
knobcone pine	Pinus attenuata
foxtail pine	Pinus balfouriana
lodgepole pine	Pinus contorta
Jeffrey pine	Pinus jeffreyi
sugar pine	Pinus lambertiana
western white pine	Pinus monticola
ponderosa pine	Pinus ponderosa
gray pine	Pinus sabiniana
Douglas-fir	Pseudotsuga menziesii
Bitterbrush	Purshia tridentate
canyon live oak	Quercus chrysolepis
blue oak	Quercus douglasii
leather oak	Quercus durata
huckleberry oak	Quercus vaccinifolia
California coffeeberry	Rhamnus californica
western azalea	Rhododendron occidentale
willow	Salix (several species)
mountain hemlock	Tsuga mertensiana

== Lakes and rivers ==
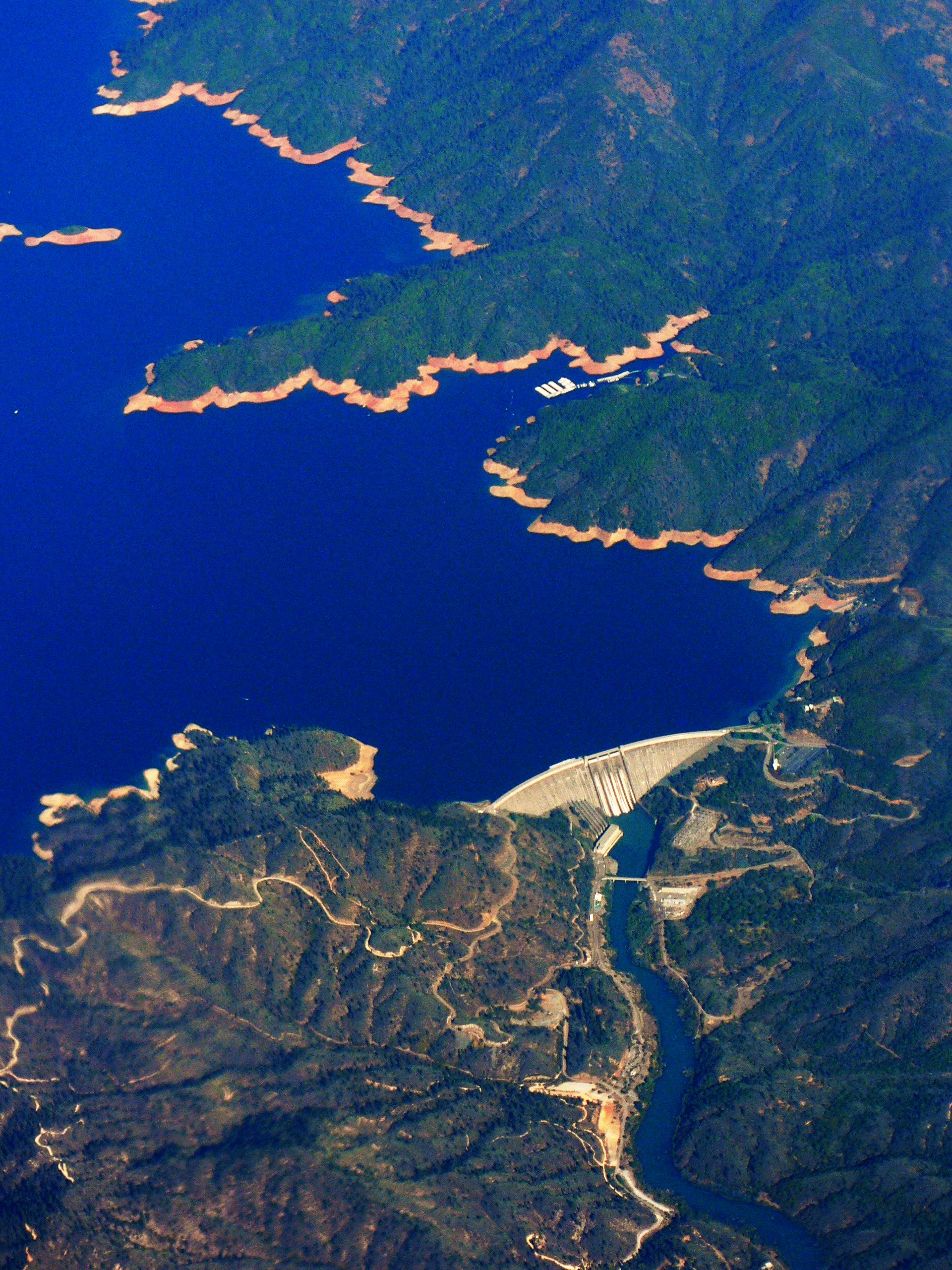
Shasta Dam

The main branch of the Trinity River is a designated a National Wild and Scenic River which runs through the forest. The Shasta–Trinity National Forest also covers almost 70 percent of the watershed of the South Fork Trinity River, a tributary of the Trinity River.

Shasta, Lewiston and Trinity Lakes are part of the Whiskeytown–Shasta–Trinity National Recreation Area.

Shasta Lake has 365 miles (587 km) of shoreline made-up of many arms and inlets. The four major arms of the lake are: Sacramento, McCloud, Squaw Creek and Pit and have scenery as well as unusual geologic and historic areas.

Lewiston Lake, near the town of Weaverville, lies just downstream from Trinity Dam and Lake and just north of the town of Lewiston and is a constant level lake. It lies within the Whiskeytown–Shasta–Trinity National Recreation Area.

Iron Canyon (northeast of Shasta Lake, near the town of Big Bend), Lewiston, Lake McCloud (south of the town of McCloud), Shasta and Trinity Lakes are large reservoirs extensively used for fishing, boating and camping. Houseboats can also be rented at Shasta Lake.

There are many fishing opportunities in the forest. There are several alpine lakes in the Trinity Divide area (west and southwest of the town of Mt. Shasta City), most of which support trout. The Trinity River, near the town of Weaverville, is very popular for salmon and steelhead angling, as is the Stuart Fork of the Trinity River and such streams as Canyon Creek (closed to fishing below Canyon Creek Falls), Coffee, Grizzly, Rush and Swift Creeks, all of which drain the Trinity Alps Wilderness, also near Weaverville.

== Peaks, trails and byways ==
The Shasta–Trinity National Forest has over 460 miles (740 km) of trails including a 154-mile (248 km) section of the Pacific Crest Trail in an east–west direction.

The 500-mile (804.7 km) Volcanic Legacy Scenic Byway is an auto tour of northern California's volcanos and begins at Lassen Volcanic National Park, then to Mount Shasta and ends at Crater Lake National Park.

Beginning in McCloud, the Modoc Volcanic Scenic Byway travels through some unique volcanic scenery in the eastern portion of the Forest on its way to Medicine Lake, Lava Beds National Monument, and Tule Lake.

== Lookouts and cabins ==
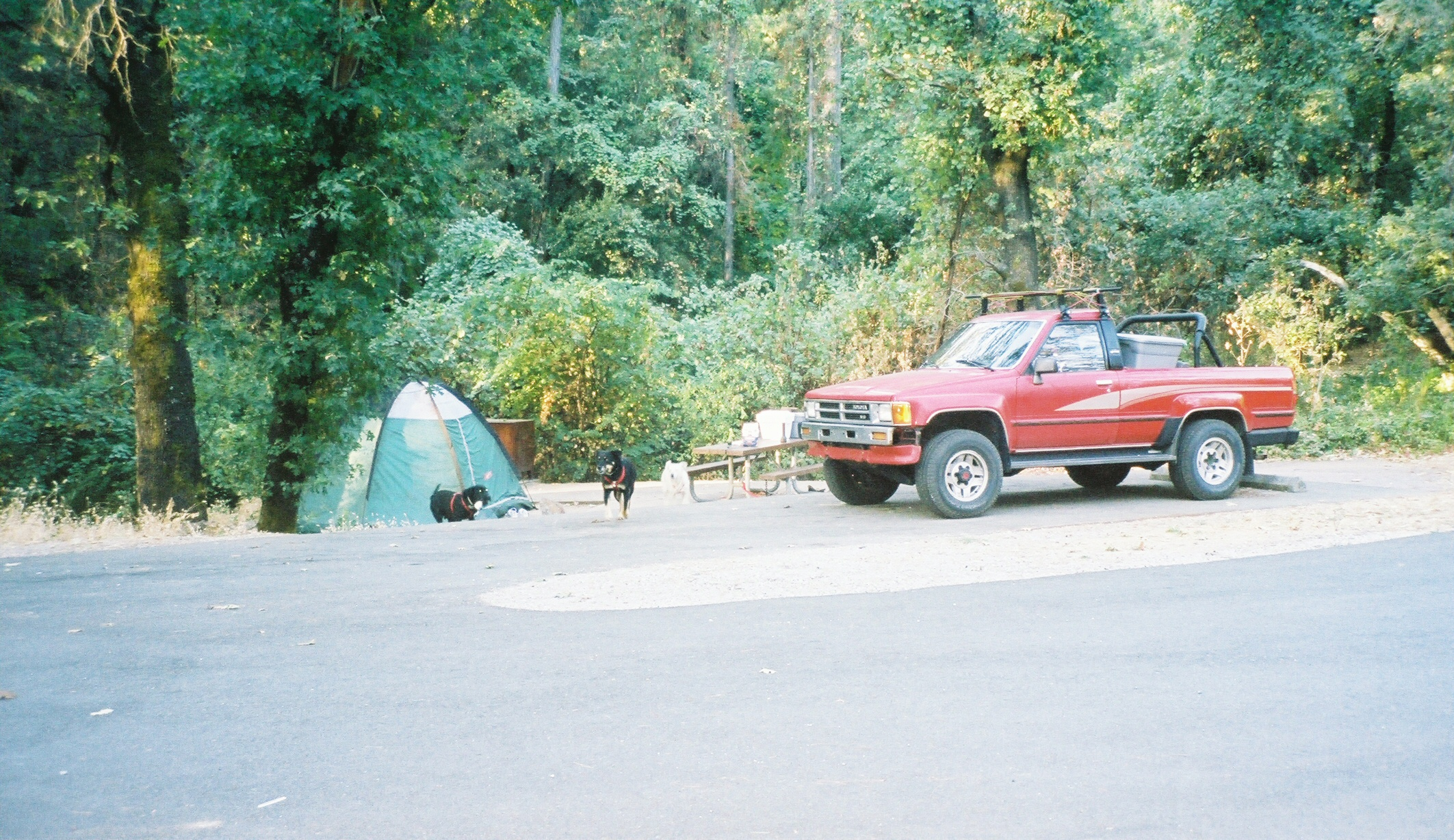
Bailey Cove Campground on the shores of Shasta Lake within the Shasta–Trinity National Forest.

In the lavaflow area of Medicine Lake Volcano is the Little Mt. Hoffman fire lookout. Restored to its original character, the lookout is offered as an overnight retreat for personal recreation use. From a height of 7,309 feet (2,228 m), Little Mt. Hoffman offers a view of Mt. Shasta, Lassen Peak, Mt. McLoughlin and a variety of other landforms. From the Tulelake Basin in the north to the Fall River valley in the south, the 360 degree view offers a view at some of northern California's most notable scenery. There is also Hirz lookout near Lake Shasta and the Post Creek lookout (somewhat near the town of Platina, on the southern end of the forest).

The Forest Glen cabin is a historic guard station, the oldest Forest Service building on the Shasta–Trinity National Forest. It was built in 1916 under the direction of John T. Grey, District Ranger of the Mad River Ranger District on the old Trinity National Forest. It is available for rent all year.

== See also ==
- List of national forests of the United States
