= Dunsmuir =

Dunsmuir may refer to:

- Dunsmuir, California, a city in the northern part of the state
- Dunsmuir station, an Amtrak station in Dunsmuir, California
- Dunsmuir station (British Columbia), a Via Rail station
- Dola Dunsmuir, Canadian socialite
- James Dunsmuir, Canadian industrialist and former premier of British Columbia
- Robert Dunsmuir, Canadian industrialist

== See also ==
- Dunsmuir v New Brunswick, a leading Supreme Court of Canada case on judicial review
- Dunsmuir House, an Oakland mansion built by a son of Robert Dunsmuir
- Dunsmuir Botanical Gardens, a park in Dunsmuir, California
- Dunsmuir Tunnel, a subway tunnel under its namesake Vancouver street
- Dunsmuir Municipal-Mott Airport, an airport near Dunsmuir, California
- Dunsmuir Viaduct, a viaduct in downtown Vancouver
