= Shasta Cascade =

Mountainous region of California

Coordinates: 41.150°N 121.673°W

- Region of California
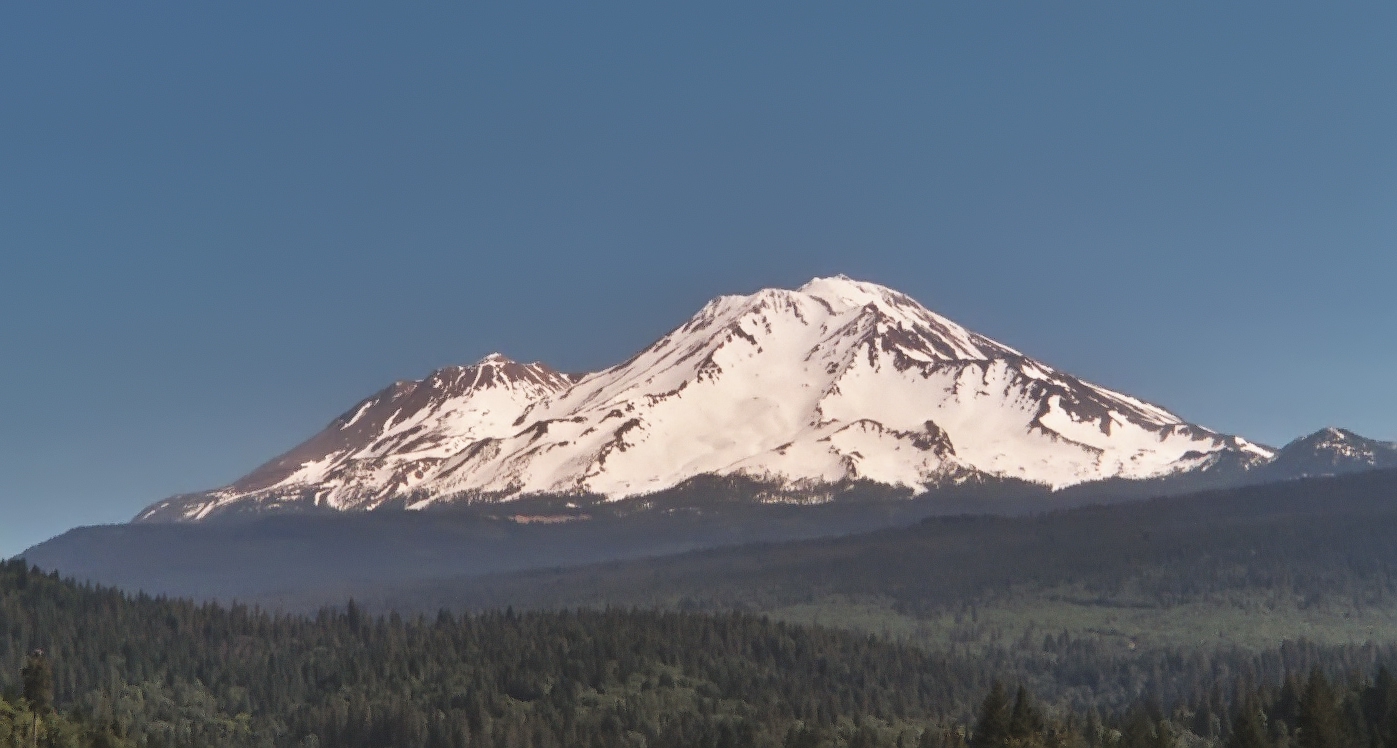
- View of Mount Shasta

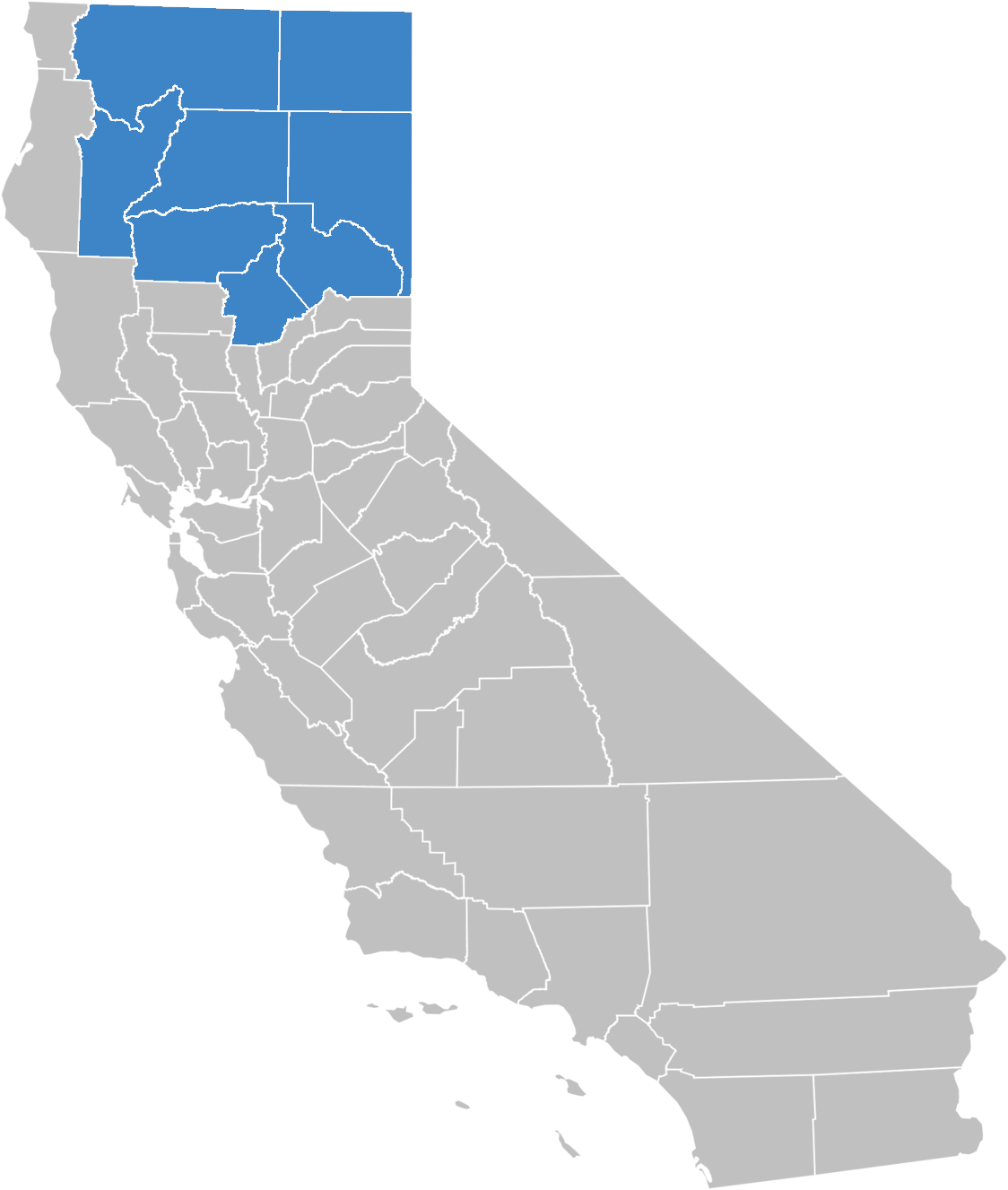
- Location of Shasta Cascade in California
- State: California
- Subregions: Klamath Basin; Modoc Plateau
- Core cities: Redding, Chico

The Shasta Cascade region of California is located in the northeastern and north-central sections of the state bordering Oregon and Nevada, including far northern parts of the Central Valley and the Sierra Nevada mountain range.

== History ==
=== Indigenous cultures ===
Historically, the Shasta Cascade region was home to Native Americans of the Modoc, Maidu, Okwanuchu, Paiute, Shasta, Wintu, and Yana tribes, and sub-groups of those tribes.

=== Colonialism ===
The first non-Native Americans entered the Shasta Cascade region by coming south along the Siskiyou Trail from Oregon, or north along the Siskiyou Trail from central California or the San Francisco Bay Area. These earliest explorers were probably British and American fur-trappers and traders in the 1820s and 1830s, although it is also possible that Spanish explorers reached the southern edge of the Shasta Cascade region before 1820.

=== Gold rush ===
The discovery of gold in 1851 at Yreka (and throughout Siskiyou and Trinity counties) brought the California Gold Rush-era prospectors up the rivers of the region in search of gold, leading to the first non-Native American settlements in the area, including at Old Shasta, Portuguese Flat, Upper Soda Springs, Weaverville, and Yreka itself.

== Geography ==
There are seven national forests in the Shasta Cascade region: Klamath National Forest, Lassen National Forest, Modoc National Forest, Plumas National Forest and Shasta–Trinity National Forest, as well as the Lava Beds National Monument.

The area is also well known for its numerous lakes, rivers, and waterfalls, including Shasta Lake, Trinity Lake, Lake Almanor, Eagle Lake, and Lake Siskiyou, the Sacramento River, McCloud River, Feather River, Trinity River, and Pit River, as well as Mossbrae Falls, the McCloud River Falls, and Burney Falls.

Numerous parks and recreation opportunities fill the area including Shasta Lake, Lake Siskiyou, Castle Crags State Park, a new park at Upper Soda Springs, the Trinity Alps, Lava Beds National Monument, Clair Engle Lake, Castle Lake, Lassen Volcanic National Park, Caribou Wilderness, Thousand Lakes Wilderness, and climbing Mount Shasta.

== Metropolitan areas ==
The civic "capital" of the Shasta Cascade area is Redding; other cities and towns are Alturas, Biggs, Chico, Susanville, Dunsmuir, Mount Shasta, Red Bluff, Oroville, Paradise, Weed, Fall River Mills, Burney, and Yreka. Counties included in the Shasta Cascade region include Butte, Lassen, Modoc, Plumas, Shasta, Siskiyou, Tehama and Trinity.

== Geology ==
Geologically, this region is similar to the main Cascade Range, dominated by volcanism.

== See also ==
- List of museums in the Shasta Cascade
