= Ross McCloud =

American pioneer (1819–1868)

Ross McCloud (April 16, 1819 – August 22, 1868) was a California pioneer and early settler in Northern California. While he is regarded by some as a namesake of the town of McCloud, California, and the nearby McCloud River, please see historical note below.

Born and raised in Ohio, McCloud moved to Iowa when he was a young man, where at the young age of 20, he was elected to the position of County Surveyor of newly organized Linn County, Iowa. He married Mary Campbell in Iowa in 1848, came to California during the California Gold Rush as a Forty-Niner in the early 1850s, but had limited success in the gold fields. His wife took the Oregon Trail and joined him in Northern California in 1853. Together they operated an early inn in the (now-disappeared) mining settlement of Portuguese Flat, California on the upper Sacramento River. The McClouds purchased the rights of the Lockhart brothers to property at the site now known as Upper Soda Springs in present-day Dunsmuir, California, where they expanded an early wayside hostel into a more substantial inn.

McCloud was instrumental in improving the roads and trails in Siskiyou County, California, and was twice elected County Surveyor. In 1856, the Shasta Courier published a statement by Ross McCloud in which he advertised completion of his new project: "The new trail by way of the Sacramento river to Yreka is now completed and (mule) trains can now pass without crossing any mountains or having any deep snows to contend with. No molestation from Indians. The undersigned claims this trail to be the best mountain trail in Calif, and asks the public to test its merits and decide for themselves. There is no want of feed for animals on this route. Ross McCloud, Shasta, Cal. Feb, 2, 1856." McCloud's improvements were an upgrade to an earlier and rougher version of what became known as the Siskiyou Trail.

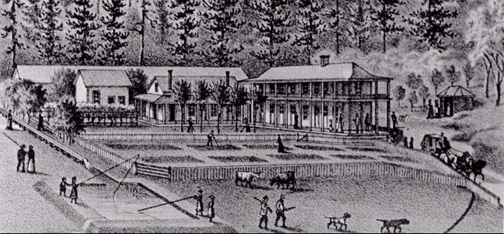
Engraving of the Upper Soda Springs Resort, circa 1875-1880

By 1860, mule train and later stagecoach traffic between California's Central Valley, Yreka, California and Oregon had increased, and the McClouds (and their business partner Isaac Fry) built and operated a toll bridge over the Sacramento River at Upper Soda Springs, as well as increasing the size of the inn. In particular, travelers came to enjoy the "soda water" at the Upper Soda Springs site. Ross also built and operated a sawmill near present-day Mount Shasta, California.

The McClouds eventually sold their interest in the Upper Soda Springs inn, and moved to a ranch near present-day Gazelle, California, where Ross died in 1868. The Upper Soda Springs inn was later acquired and operated by the daughter of Ross and Mary, Elda McCloud Masson, under the name "Upper Soda Springs Resort" until 1920 (see image at right of Upper Soda Springs Resort about 1885).

== Origin of the placename "McCloud" ==
The McCloud River was likely originally known as the "McLeod River," after Alexander Roderick McLeod, the leader of a number of hunting and trapping expeditions for the Hudson's Bay Company in Northern and Central California. A.R. McLeod's expedition of 1829-1830 spent several weeks during that winter trapped by heavy snow near the headwaters of the McCloud River. By the early 1860s, however, the spelling "McCloud River" was widely used in the region; while some regard this spelling as being adopted partly to respect the pioneer Ross McCloud and his family, it appears that the use of the "McCloud" spelling developed primarily as it was the conventional American spelling of the name. When the town of McCloud, California was later organized, the town similarly took the spelling "McCloud."
