= Dunsmuir Botanical Gardens =

Municipal park and botanical garden in Dunsmuir, California

Coordinates: 41.14°N 122.16°W

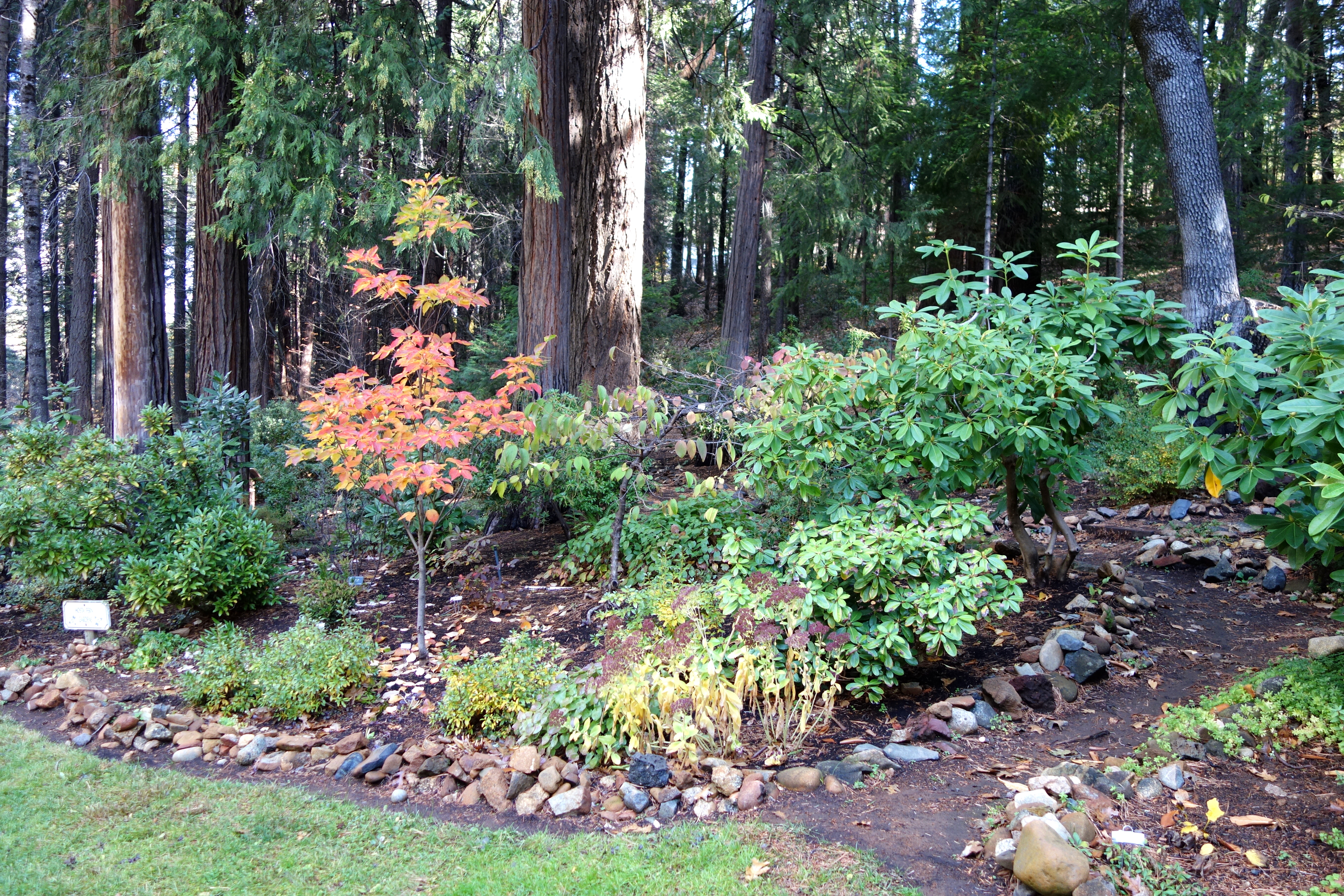
Dunsmuir Botanical Gardens

Dunsmuir City Park and Botanical Gardens is a 10-acre (4.0-hectare) municipal park and botanical garden maintained by Dunsmuir Botanical Gardens Inc., a non-profit 501(c)(3)organization of volunteers within Dunsmuir City Park in the city of Dunsmuir, California near Mount Shasta. The Gardens are on City of Dunsmuir property under the general control of Siskiyou County via the Board of Directors of the Dunsmuir Park & Recreation District.

== Gardens ==
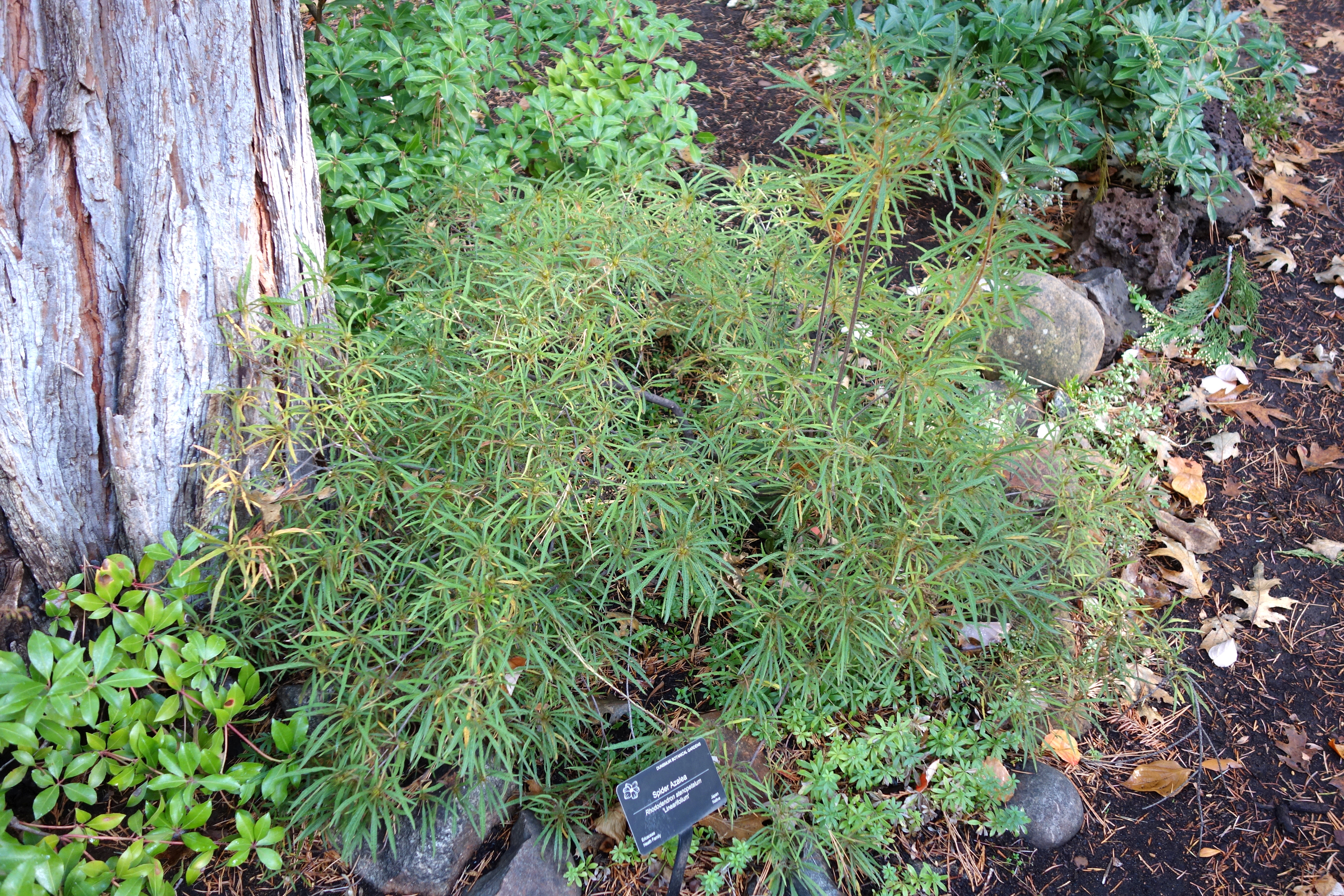
Rhododendron stenopetalum specimen

The Botanical Gardens encompass about ten acres (4.0 hectares) of a hilly, wooded area with a meadow, a playground area, and picnic sites bordering the Upper Sacramento River. Native white dogwood is prolific in the park and blooms in the spring. There are many Shasta lilies growing on the hillsides and native azaleas grow along the river. In addition to the many native species, a variety of other perennial plants and shrubs have been introduced. These include rhododendrons, hostas, ferns and Japanese maples. During the spring and summer, various annual plants are cultivated.

Numerous walking trails are found in the park, from which the plant material may be viewed. The meadow is the venue for the 'Tribute to the Trees' concert and other events throughout the year.

== Events ==
The Gardens host weddings, concerts and group picnics. Each summer, the annual Tribute To the Trees concert presents an outdoor dinner concert on the lawns and stage along the upper Sacramento River. Member-donors from California, Oregon and Arizona, attend the concert. Educational programs included the Elder Hostel's Road Scholars program for Grandparents and Grandchildren and river education programs hosted by the River Exchange.

== Fishing ==
Trout fishing is allowed off season year around on a catch and release basis.

== Animals ==
River otters can be seen in the river, where the Cantara Loop trail derailment and chemical spill once sterilized this section of the river—the area upstream from the spill gradually restored much of the river's biosphere, and the fishery is healthy, though crayfish and frogs have yet to reappear. Mink, cougar, bear, fisher and martin are sometimes in the immediate area.

== Babe Ruth ==
New York Yankees Babe Ruth and Bob Meusel played an exhibition baseball game in the park, against the Dunsmuir locals. The original grandstand was recently repaired and repainted after suffering damage in a winter storm. There is a Lions Club plaque commemorating the event outside the grandstand.

== Southern Pacific Locomotive #1727 ==
In the park may be found Locomotive 1727, a class M-6 Mogul built by Baldwin Locomotive Works in 1901. It served Southern Pacific in California and Oregon until 1956. 1727 is one of seven Mogul engines now in existence, out of 355 originally built.

== Management and funding ==
The Botanic Garden is a member of the American Public Gardens Association. The Park is dependent upon concerts, contributions and grants.

== See also ==
- List of botanical gardens in the United States
- Dunsmuir, California
- Mossbrae Falls
