= Dunsmuir station =

Train station in Dunsmuir, California, U.S.

Dunsmuir, CA
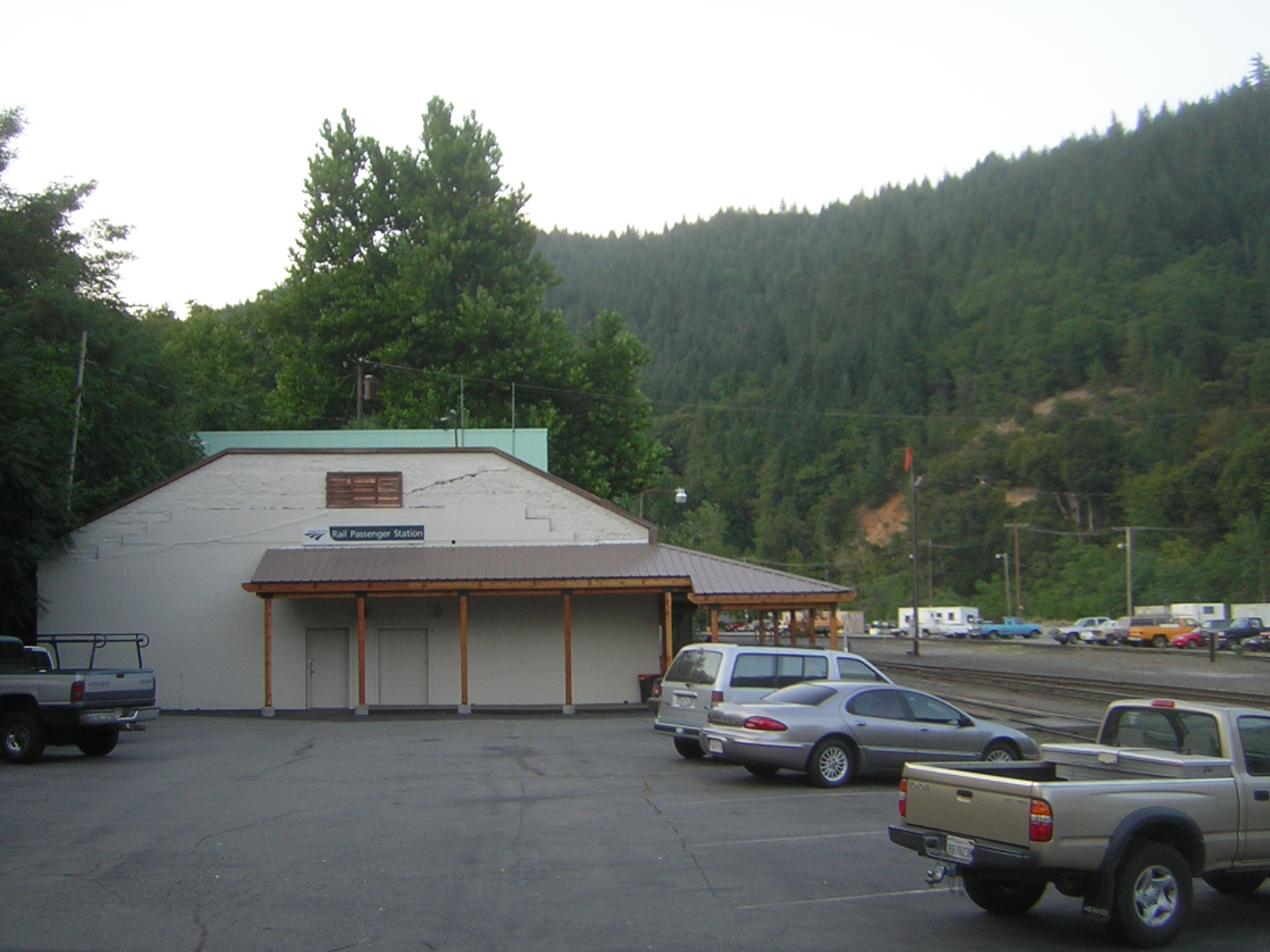
- Dunsmuir station in August 2006

General information
- Location: 5750 Sacramento Avenue; Dunsmuir, California
- Coordinates: 41.2112°N 122.2706°W
- Owner: Union Pacific Railroad
- Line: UP Black Butte/Valley Subdivisions
- Platforms: 1 side platform
- Tracks: 2

Construction
- Parking: Yes
- Accessible: Yes

Other information
- Station code: Amtrak: DUN

History
- Opened: January 1887
- Original company: Southern Pacific

Passengers
- FY 2025: 3,794 (Amtrak)

Services
Preceding station	Amtrak	Following station
Redding toward Los Angeles	Coast Starlight	Klamath Falls toward Seattle
Former services
Preceding station	Southern Pacific Railroad	Following station
Castle Crag toward Oakland Pier	Shasta Route	Shasta Springs toward Portland
Location

The Dunsmuir station is an Amtrak train station in Dunsmuir, California. It is used by Union Pacific Railroad as a crew change point, but is not staffed by Amtrak. Dunsmuir station is the northernmost passenger rail station in the state of California. The modern station has telephones and restrooms and is maintained by city residents and local rail enthusiasts.

In addition to the passenger waiting room, the building houses the Dunsmuir Museum of the Dunsmuir Railroad Depot Historical Society, which has exhibits on local railroad history. In 2012, the society became home to the Southern Pacific (SP) Shasta Division archives.

== History ==
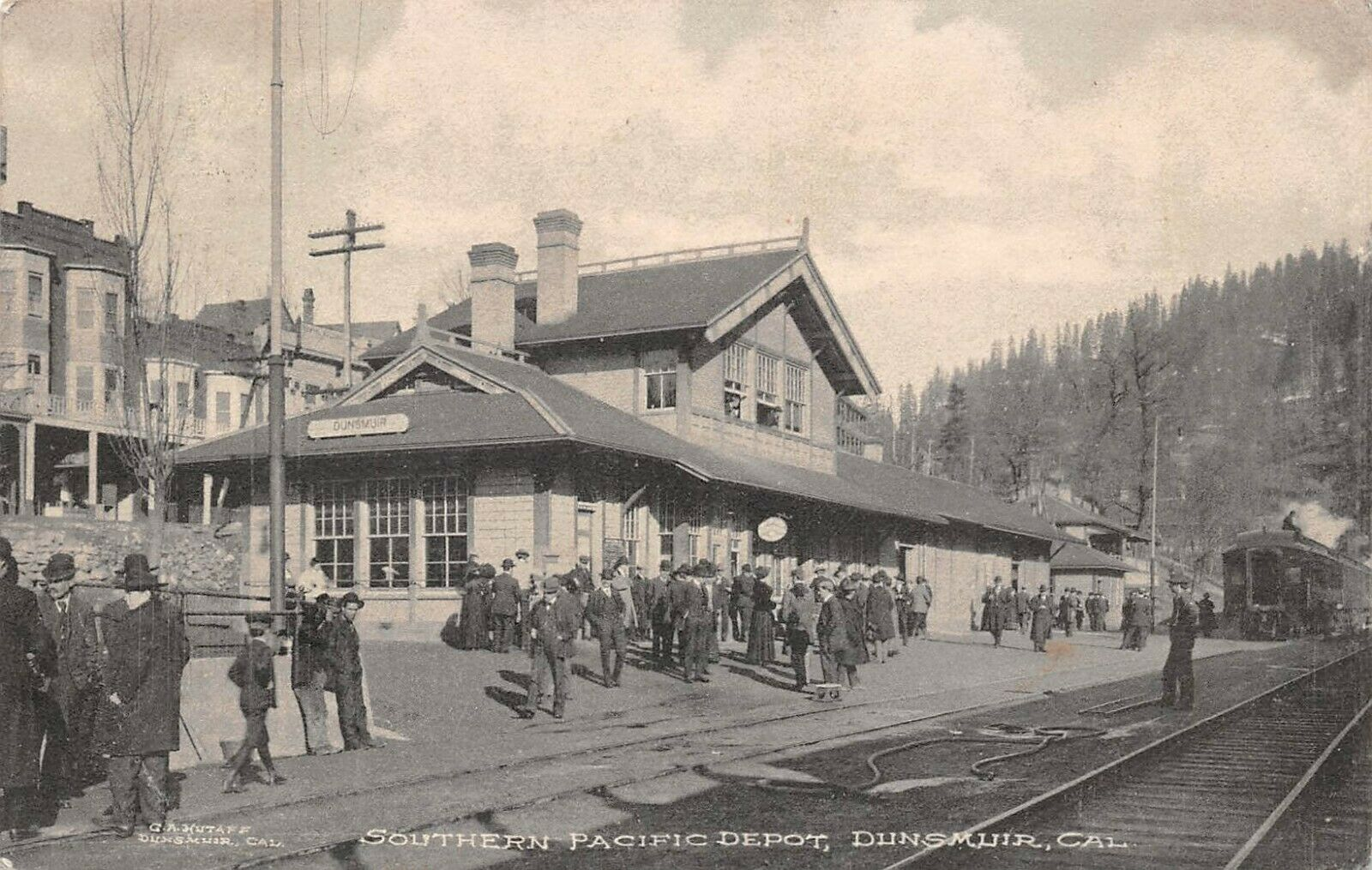
Postcard view of the former station

The Central Pacific Railroad had constructed their rail line up the Siskiyou Trail by 1886, and the settlement of Pusher was founded near Upper Soda Springs as a town to support rail operations in the area. The first Dunsmuir stop was simply a boxcar located lower on the line further to the south than the current town. In January 1887, the Dunsmuir station was moved to the railroad's engine house while retaining the name, whereupon the town also adopted the moniker.

When Amtrak was formed in 1971 and Southern Pacific Shasta Route services were discontinued, Dunsmuir retained rail service as a stop on the Coast Starlight. Due to the way schedules are aligned, both the northbound and southbound trains pass through in the middle of the night.

As of 2024, construction to modify the platform for accessibility is underway, with completion expected in FY 2025.
