= Hedge Creek Falls =

Coordinates: 41°14′14.35″N 122°16′5.30″W

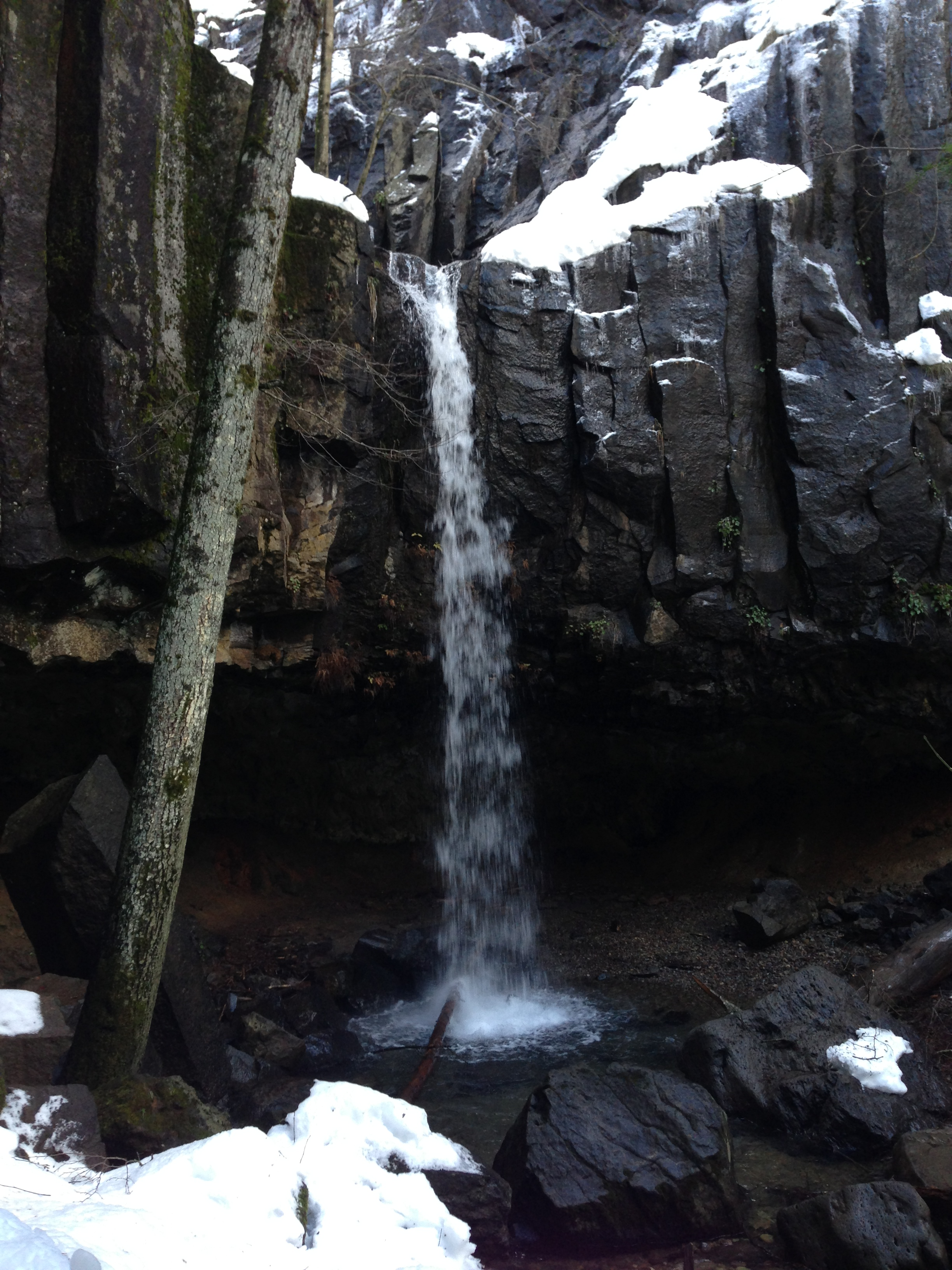
Hedge Creek Falls in Dunsmuir, CA

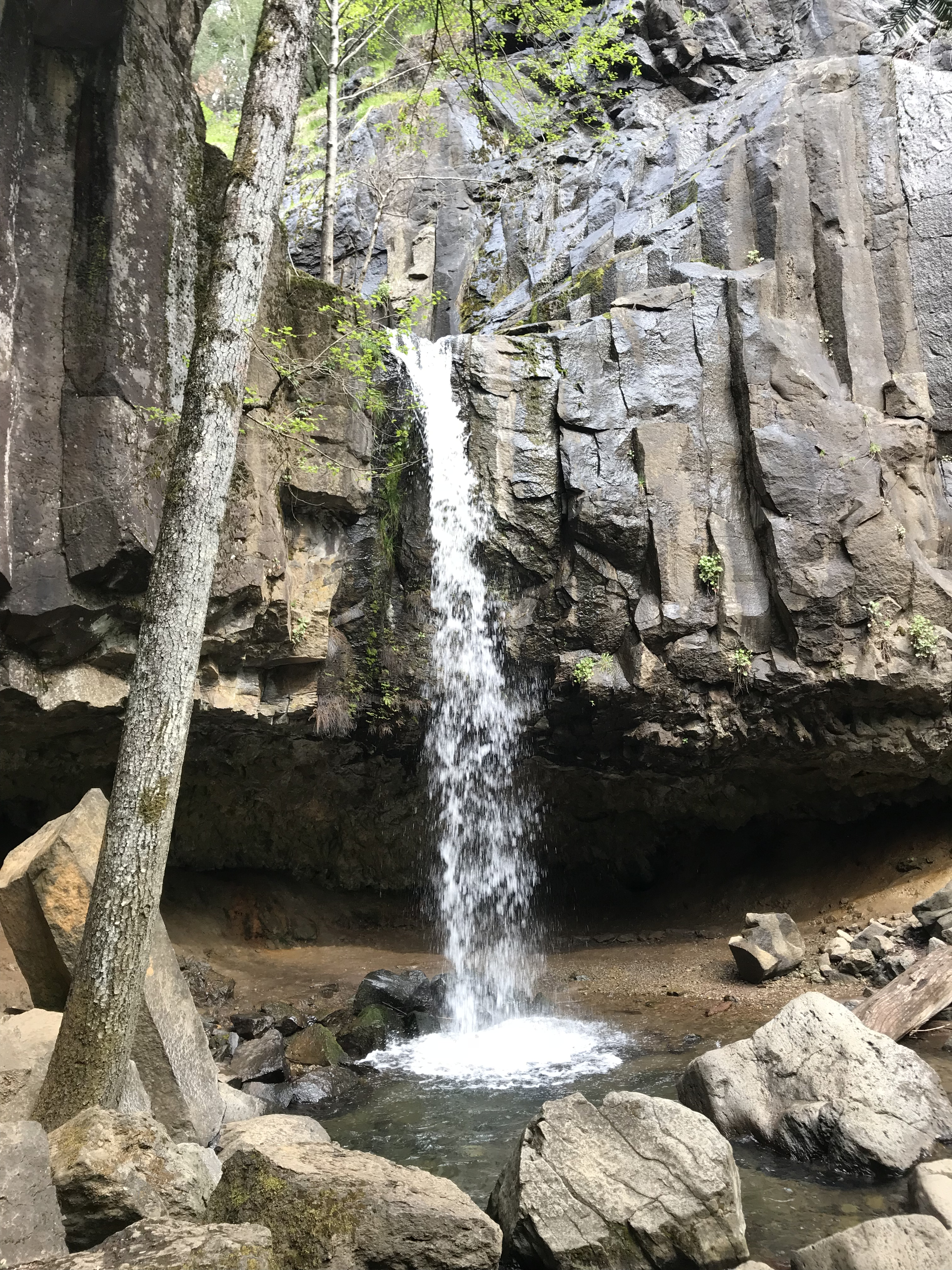
Hedge Creek Falls in April

Hedge Creek Falls is a waterfall on Hedge Creek, in the Shasta Cascade area in Dunsmuir, California. There is a small cave located behind the waterfall, allowing visitors to walk behind the cascading water. Shortly after the waterfall, hedge creek flows into the Sacramento River south of Mossbrae Falls. There is a viewing platform over the river, with a view of Mount Shasta. Access to the waterfall and viewing platform is via a short hiking trail. The trail starts at a small park off the Dunsmuir Ave/Siskiyou Ave exit on Interstate 5. The waterfall is 0.2 miles (0.32 km) down Hedge Creek Falls Trail. The close proximity to Interstate 5, makes the waterfall a very popular stopping point for passing motorists.

== Geology and Hydrology ==
Hedge Creek Falls is located on the southernmost tip of a pre-Pleistocene lava flow from Mount Shasta. Thousands of years of erosion, mostly from the freezing and thawing of water trapped in cracks on the basaltic face, has resulted in the sheared appearance at the face of the falls. The cave behind the falls is a normal occurrence in thick lava flows and not the result of splashing water. The water in Hedge Creek Falls comes from the massive aquifer resultant of several volcanic occurrences and not from the glaciers found on Mt. Shasta. Although small, Hedge Creek Falls is full of beauty and awe. Its single crest, or lip, is reminiscent of its larger sister, Bridalveil Fall, in Yosemite.

== Million Dollar Waterfall ==
Original interstate 5 construction plans called for Hedge Creek Falls to be buried beneath I-5. Local residents complained so bitterly they forced the highway to be relocated further into the hill. The total cost of this relocation was around a million dollars, hence the nickname "Million Dollar Waterfall".

== Black Bart ==
Charles E. Bolton, better known as Black Bart, robbed the Roseburg, Oregon to Redding, California stage near Dunsmuir on October 25, 1879. Evidence found at the time indicated that Bart hid in the shallow cave behind the falls prior to the holdup. This was one of three holdups committed by Black Bart in this area. Normally he operated much further south.

== See also ==
- List of waterfalls
- List of waterfalls in California
