= Shasta Springs =

Former resort in northern California

Coordinates: 41.2468204°N 122.2611193°W

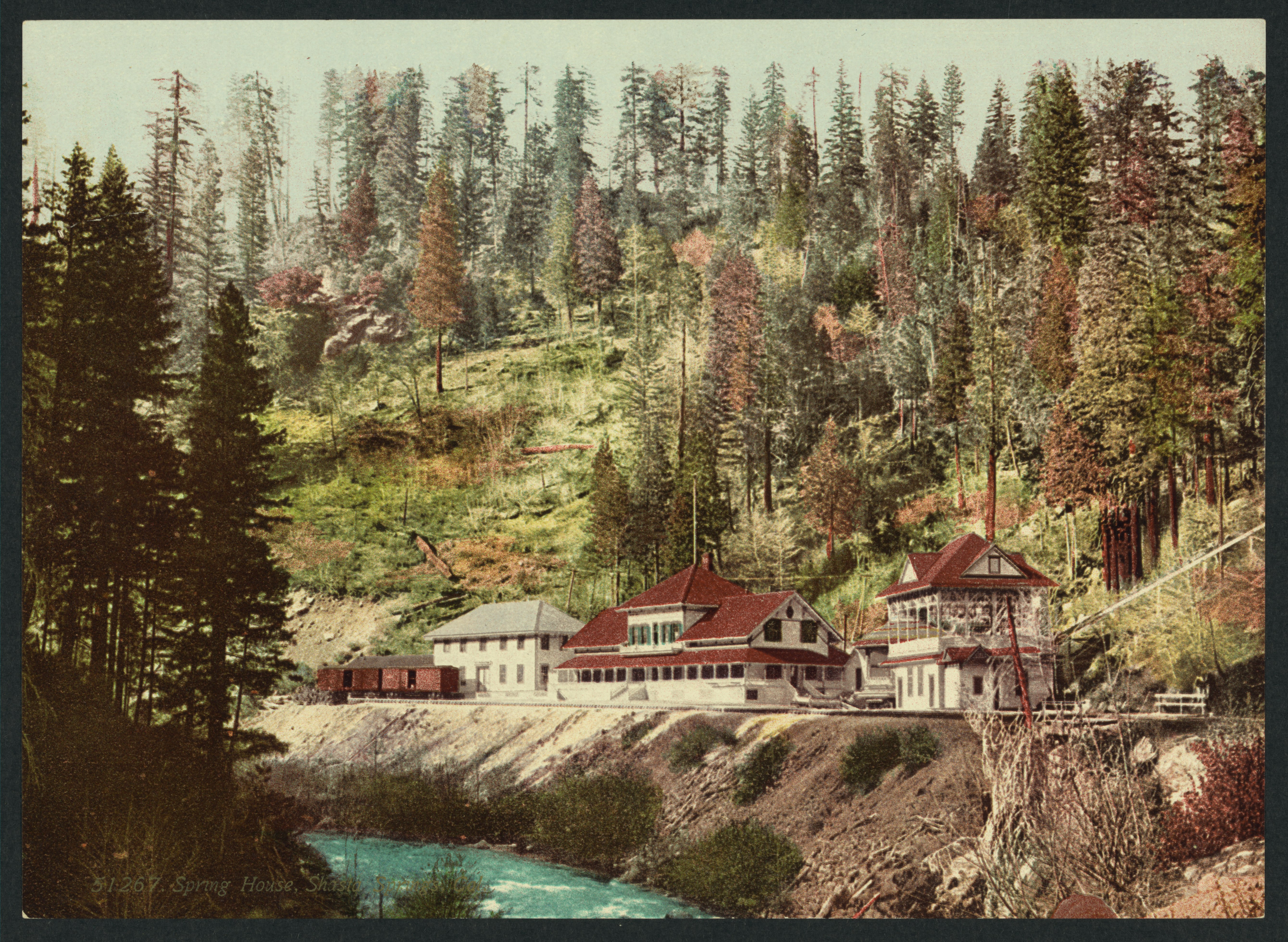
Spring House at Shasta Springs

Shasta Springs was a popular summer resort during the late 19th and early 20th centuries on the Upper Sacramento River in northern California. It was located just north of the town of Dunsmuir, and just north of Upper Soda Springs along the Siskiyou Trail.

The resort was on the main line of the Southern Pacific Railroad, where natural springs on the property were the original sources of the water and beverages that became known as the Shasta brand of soft drinks.

The resort closed in the early 1950s when it was sold and continues to be owned by the Saint Germain Foundation, and is used as a major facility by that organization. It is no longer open to the public and the lower part of the resort – the bottling plant, the train station, the incline railway, the kiosk and the fountains – are all gone. The falls that were visible from the railroad tracks and what ruins are left of the lower part of the resort are all overgrown by blackberry bushes.

Angel Trail and Mineral Spring Trail in this private property leads down to the railway track near couple of small falls. The famous Mossbrae Falls is on the other side of the bridge, crossing the Sacramento River.
