= Portuguese Flat, California =

Unincorporated community in California, United States

Coordinates: 40°59′45″N 122°25′02″W

Portuguese Flat was a California mining camp of the early 1850s during the California Gold Rush, consisting largely of Portuguese miners. It was located approximately 35 miles north of Redding near what became the unincorporated community of Pollard Flat. It is in the ZIP code area of 96051 and the area code 530.

== History ==
Arising along the route of the Siskiyou Trail, Portuguese Flat, with its rich diggings, gained the reputation of being one of the roughest camps in northern Shasta County; it was also known as a "squaw town" because of the number of Native American women present in the town. By the time of the 1885 census, it appears that the site was deserted.

As late as 1933, just north of Pollard's Gulch on what is now Interstate 5, one could see a few old tumbledown buildings, one ancient log cabin, and some veteran apple trees — all that remained of Portuguese Flat. Pioneers Ross McCloud and Mary Campbell McCloud operated an inn in Portuguese Flat from approximately 1853–5 (before going on to operate the inn at Upper Soda Springs).

In the story of the famous "Battle of Castle Crags" (which took place in 1855), a young Joaquin Miller tells a dramatic tale of being seriously wounded, by having an arrow shot through his jaw and neck. Miller was taken to the Portuguese Flat inn operated by the McClouds to recuperate, and was nursed to health by Mary Campbell McCloud.

== Politics ==
In the state legislature Pollard Flat is in the 4th Senate District, represented by Republican Doug LaMalfa, and in the 2nd Assembly District, represented by Republican Jim Nielsen.

Federally, Pollard Flat is in California's 1st congressional district, represented by Republican James Gallagher.
