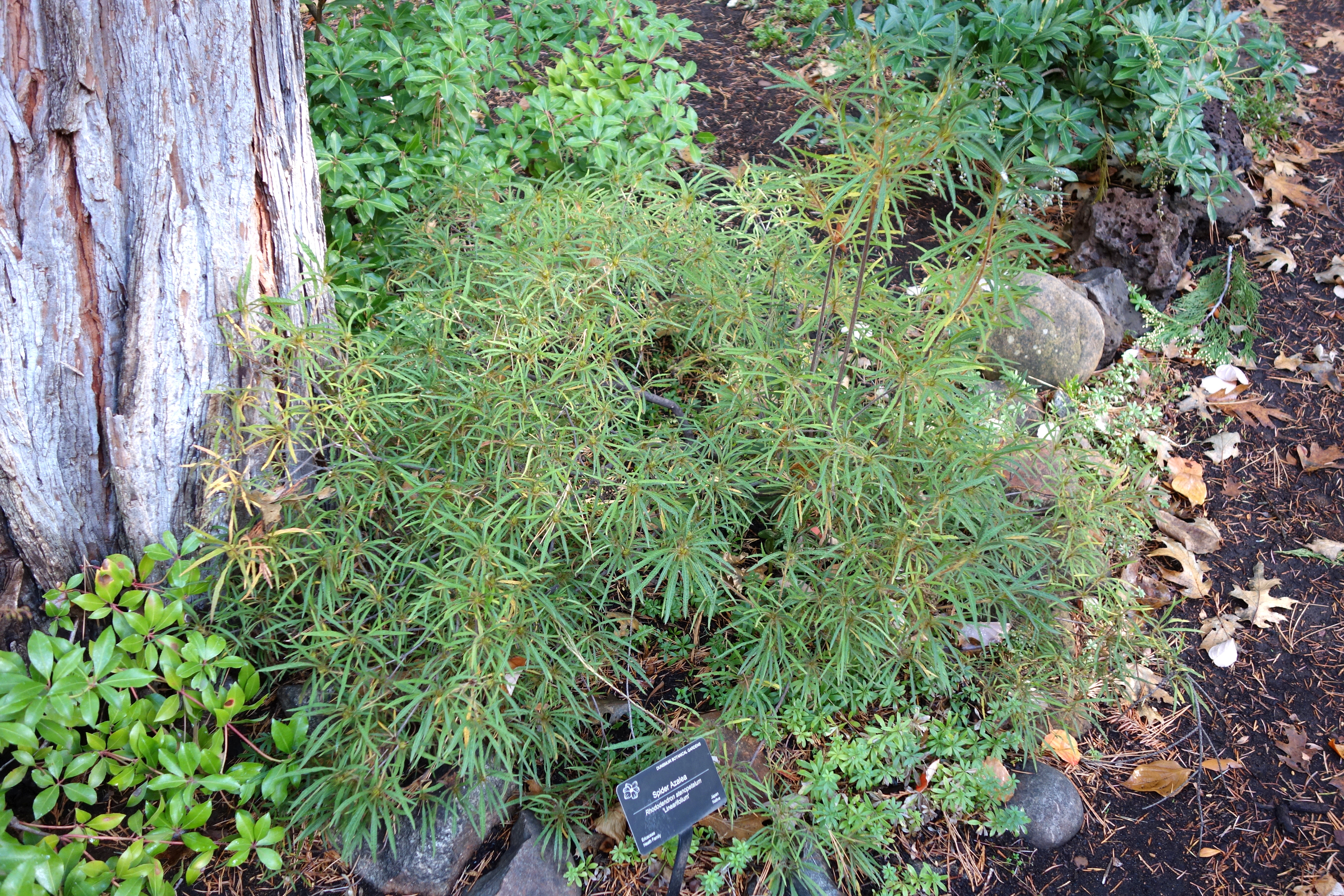

Scientific classification
- Kingdom: Plantae
- Clade: Tracheophytes
- Clade: Angiosperms
- Clade: Eudicots
- Clade: Asterids
- Order: Ericales
- Family: Ericaceae
- Genus: Rhododendron
- Subgenus: Rhododendron subg. Azaleastrum
- Species: R. stenopetalum

Binomial name
- Rhododendron stenopetalum (R.Hogg) Mabb.

Synonyms
- Azalea dianthiflora Carrière; Azalea linearifolia Hook.f.; Azalea macrosepala (Maxim.) K. Koch; Azalea stenopetala Hogg; Rhododendron dianthiflorum (Carrière) Millais; Rhododendron hortense Nakai; Rhododendron linearifolium Siebold & Zucc.; Rhododendron linearifolium var. macrosepalum (Maxim.) Makino; Rhododendron macrosepalum Maxim.

= Rhododendron stenopetalum =

Species of plant

Rhododendron stenopetalum is a rhododendron species native to southern Honshu and north-eastern Shikoku, Japan. It has been placed in subgenus Azaleastrum. It is a low shrub, with leaves that are 3–5 mm wide by 5 cm long. Its flowers are pink or lavender-pink.

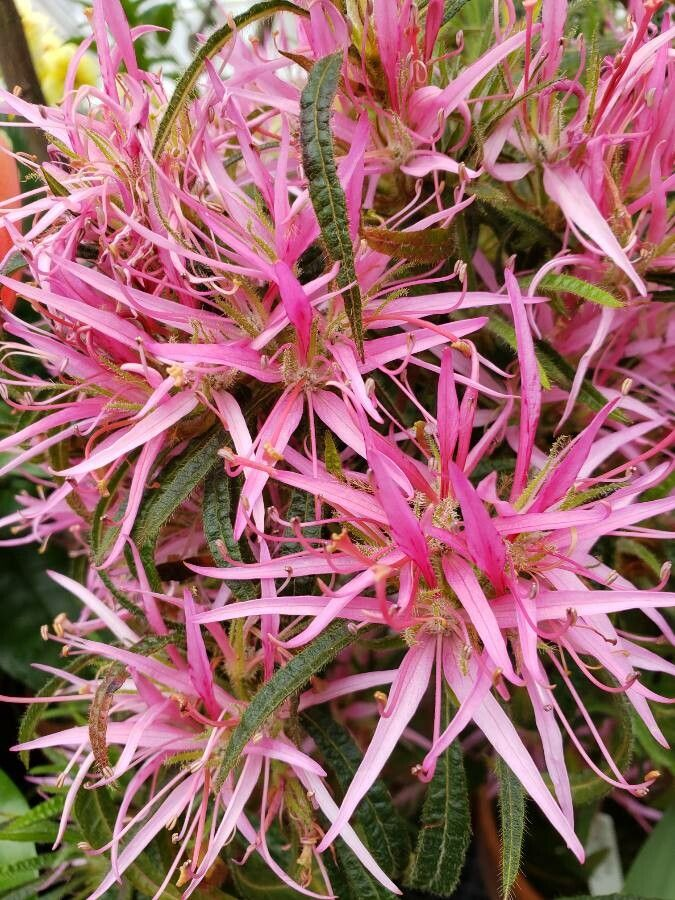
Flower clusters

== Sources ==
- D.J. Mabberley, 1990 In: Feddes Repert., 101(5-6): 270
- GBIF
- US Plant National Germplasm System
- Oregon State University
- American Rhododendron Society
