= Mossbrae Falls =

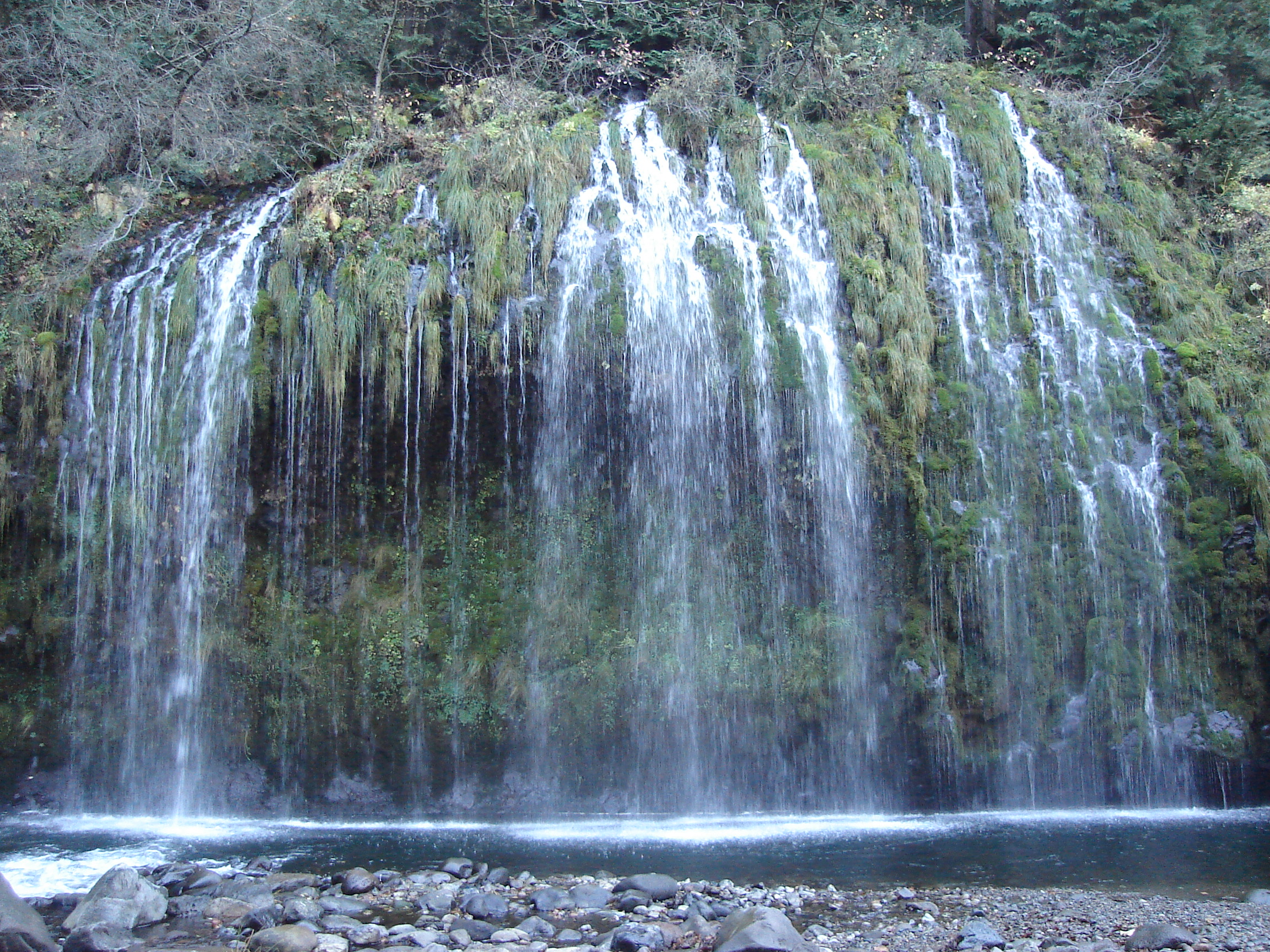

- Location within California
- Location: Dunsmuir, California, U.S.
- Coordinates: 41°14′30″N 122°16′01″W
- Type: Segmented Horsetails
- Elevation: 2,529 feet (771 m)
- Total height: 52 feet (16 m)
- Number of drops: 1
- Average width: 175 feet (53 m)
- Average flow rate: 20.0 cfs (1 cms)

Mossbrae Falls is a waterfall flowing into the Sacramento River, in the Shasta Cascade area in Dunsmuir, California, United States. The falls are located just south of the lower portion of Shasta Springs. Access to the falls is via a mile-long illegal hiking trail on the Union Pacific Railroad right of way; the City of Dunsmuir is seeking to finish a safe hiking trail that will include a bridge over the river.

California Governor Arnold Schwarzenegger took President George H. W. Bush to see the falls.

== Description ==
Approximately 50 feet (15 m) in height and 175 feet (53 m) wide, the falls are fed by springs that course down the canyon wall, and into the Sacramento River, creating the effect of many waterfall streams, two of them especially large, falling into the river. The entire course of the falls is longer than 52 feet (16 m); however the upper cascades cannot be observed through flora that covers the mountainside. The bottom 50 feet (15 m) is a straight plunge into the river.

== Etymology ==
The waterfall is named for the profusion of moss on the hillside at the site, together with brae, which means "a steep bank or hillside" in Irish and Scots.

== Access ==
The trail to the falls from Dunsmuir requires trespassing beside the Union Pacific railroad tracks for 1.2 miles (1.9 km), before the waterfall appears on the right immediately before a railroad trestle that crosses the river. The railroad line runs in a cut and in places there is little space to avoid a train; two hikers were injured by trains in 2011 and 2019. The city of Dunsmuir closed the illegal parking area in the Shasta Retreat neighborhood in 2011, and has since built most of an extension to the Hedge Creek Falls trail that when finished will cross the river on a pedestrian bridge 1,800 feet (550 m) from the falls, but requires Union Pacific's permission to complete it.

Alternate means of access are through Mineral Spring Trail and Angel Trail in Shasta Springs, a private property owned by Saint Germain Foundation, and white water rafting from Box Canyon Dam.

== Photos ==
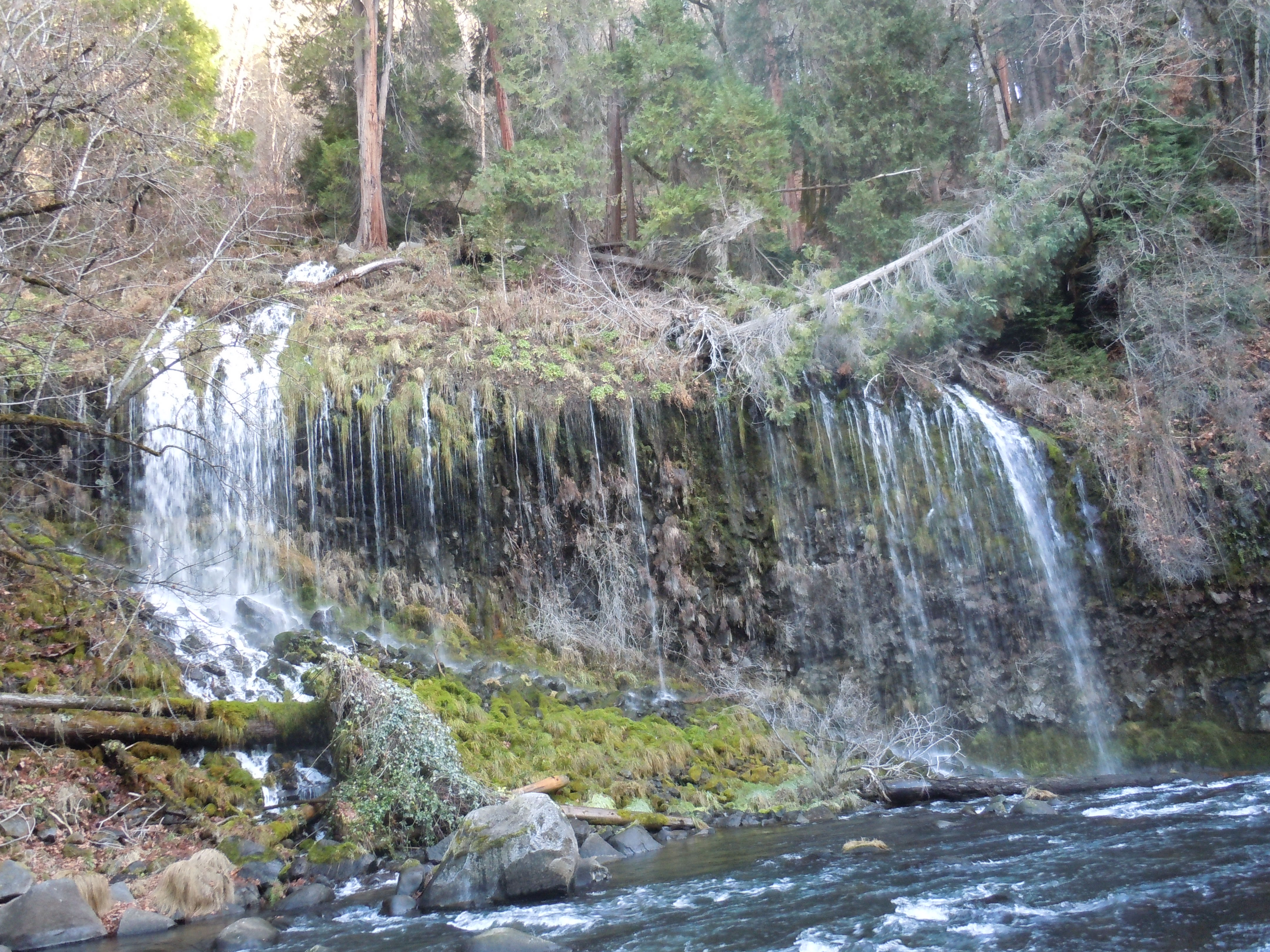
All sections of the waterfalls

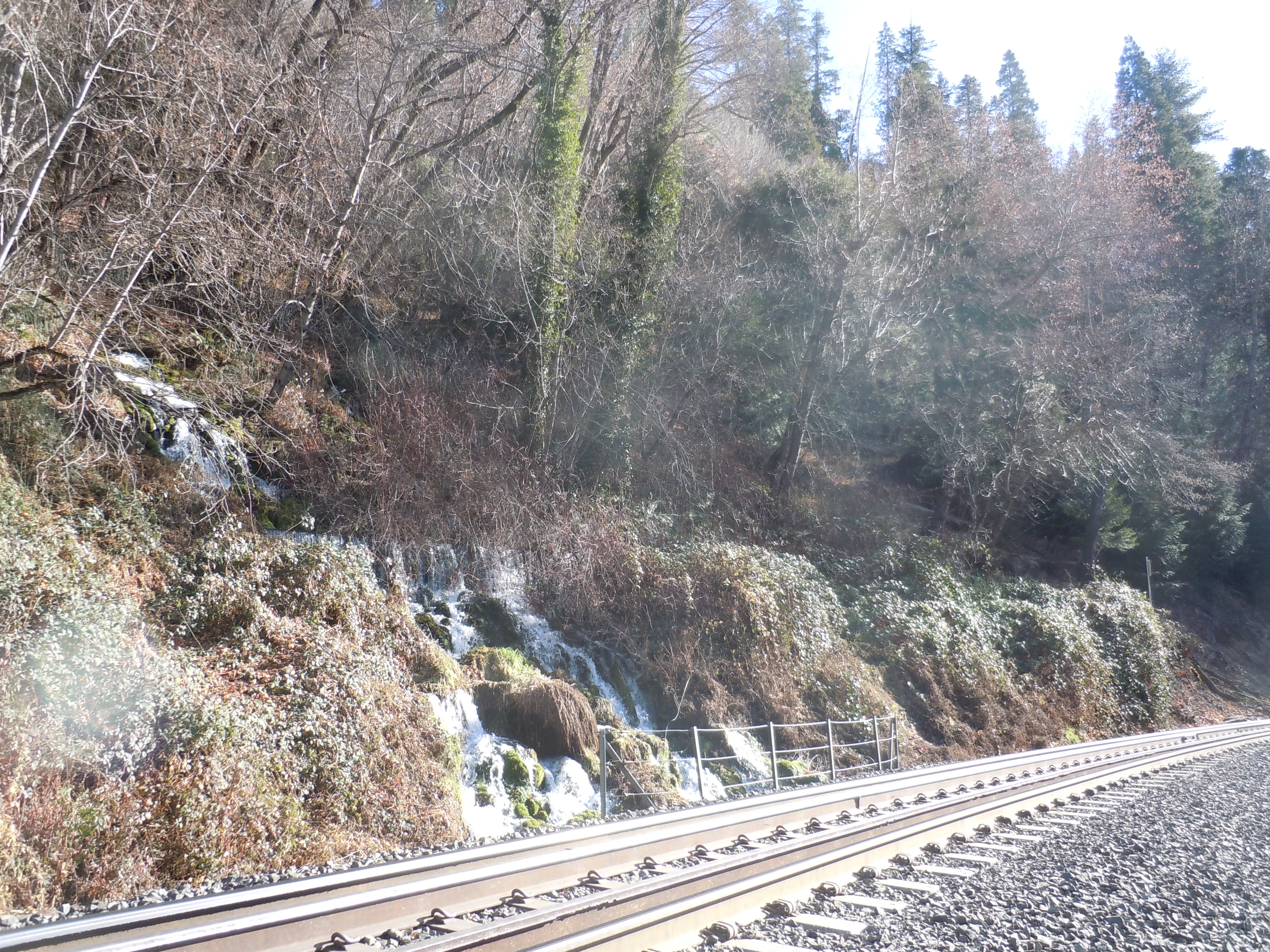
Other waterfalls in the vicinity

== See also ==
- List of waterfalls
- List of waterfalls in California
