= Dunsmuir, California =

City in California, United States

- City
- City of Dunsmuir
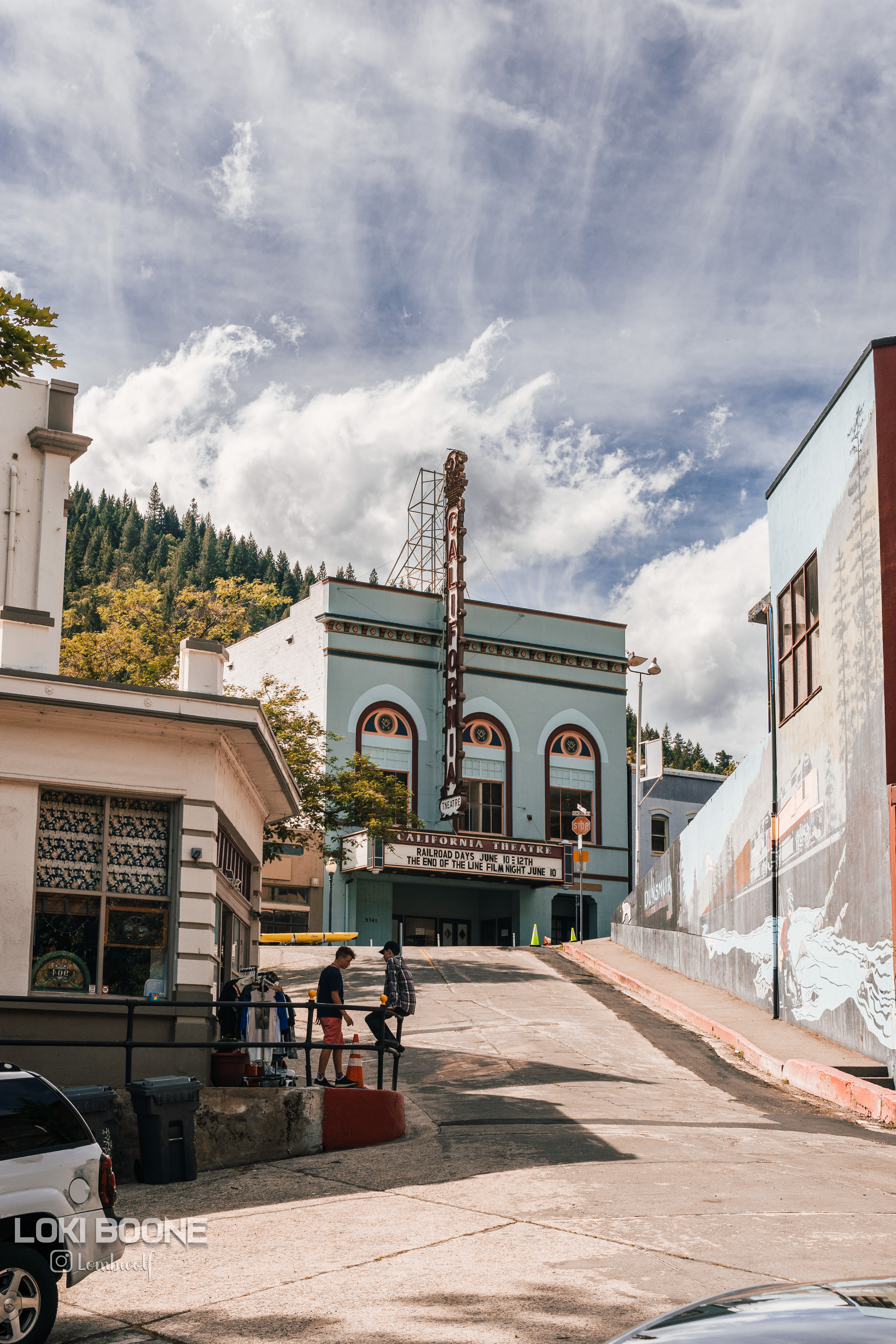
- The California Theater in Dunsmuir on a sunny day

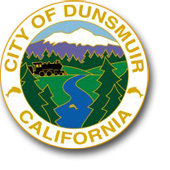
- Seal
- Motto(s): "California's City of Waterfalls" and "Home of the Best Water on Earth"
- Interactive map of Dunsmuir, California
- Location in the United States
- Coordinates: 41°13′18″N 122°16′23″W
- Country: United States
- State: California
- County: Siskiyou
- Incorporated: August 7, 1909

Government
  - Mayor: Juliana Lucchesi

Area
  - Total: 1.64 sq mi (4.25 km^{2})
  - Land: 1.61 sq mi (4.16 km^{2})
  - Water: 0.035 sq mi (0.09 km^{2}) 2.14%
- Elevation: 2,290 ft (698 m)

Population (2020)
  - Total: 1,707
  - Density: 1,063.9/sq mi (410.79/km^{2})
- Time zone: UTC-8 (Pacific (PST))
  - Summer (DST): UTC-7 (PDT)
- ZIP Code: 96025
- Area code: 530
- FIPS code: 06-20242
- GNIS feature IDs: 277501, 2410372
- Website: dunsmuirca.gov

Dunsmuir is a city in Siskiyou County, California. It is on the upper Sacramento River. Its population is 1,707 as of the 2020 census, up from 1,650 at the 2010 census.

Dunsmuir is currently a hub for tourism in Northern California, with Interstate 5 passing through it. Visitors enjoy fishing, skiing, climbing, or sight-seeing. During the steam locomotive railroad era, it was the site of an important Central Pacific (and later Southern Pacific) railroad yard, where extra steam locomotives were added to assist trains on the grade to the north.

== Commerce and tourism ==
Located in the Shasta Cascade area of Northern California, Dunsmuir is a popular destination for tourists. Visitors come to fish trout in the Sacramento and McCloud Rivers, or to see and climb Mount Shasta, Castle Crags or the Trinity Alps. Visitors ski (both alpine and cross-country) and bicycle, or can hike to the waterfalls, streams and lakes in the area, including nearby Mossbrae Falls, Hedge Creek Falls, Lake Siskiyou, Castle Lake and Shasta Lake.

Dunsmuir is located on the Upper Sacramento River, a blue ribbon trout stream that attracts fishermen from all over the world. Wild rainbow trout abound in the river. Additionally, the city has a private stocking permit from the Department of Fish and Game. The city currently has a "Big Fish Program" and stocks the river within the city limits with trophy-sized rainbow trout up to 14 pounds (6.4 kg). These stockings take place during the summer months. Catch-and-release fishing is permitted in the river during the off-season, so fly-fishing is available year-round.

The town is also a destination for historical and cultural tourists, as the town has preserved an authentic 1920s and 1930s look and feel. Dunsmuir's long connection with the railroad draws railfans to enjoy the sights and sounds of the railroad in the steep Sacramento River canyon. Dunsmuir is officially a Union Pacific "Train Town" and enjoys many financial benefits because of its relationship with the railroad.

During the summer, the city hosts many local weekend festivals, including "Dogwood Daze", "Railroad Days" and the "Tribute to the Trees" al fresco dinner/concert along the river in the city's pristine park, home to Dunsmuir Botanical Gardens. The city also has another river's edge park, Tauhindauli Park, over which passes the I-5 freeway, and several popular easy-access fishing spots.

== History ==
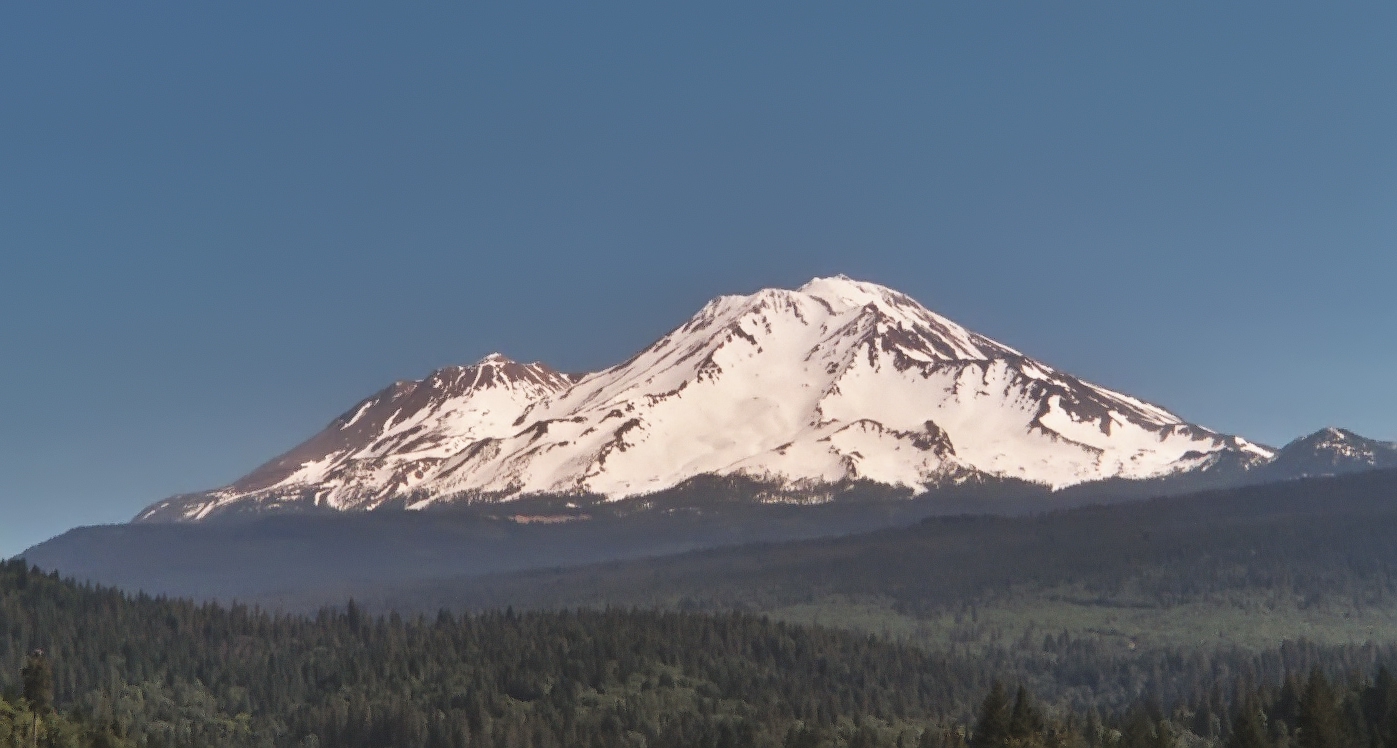
Mount Shasta as viewed from Dunsmuir

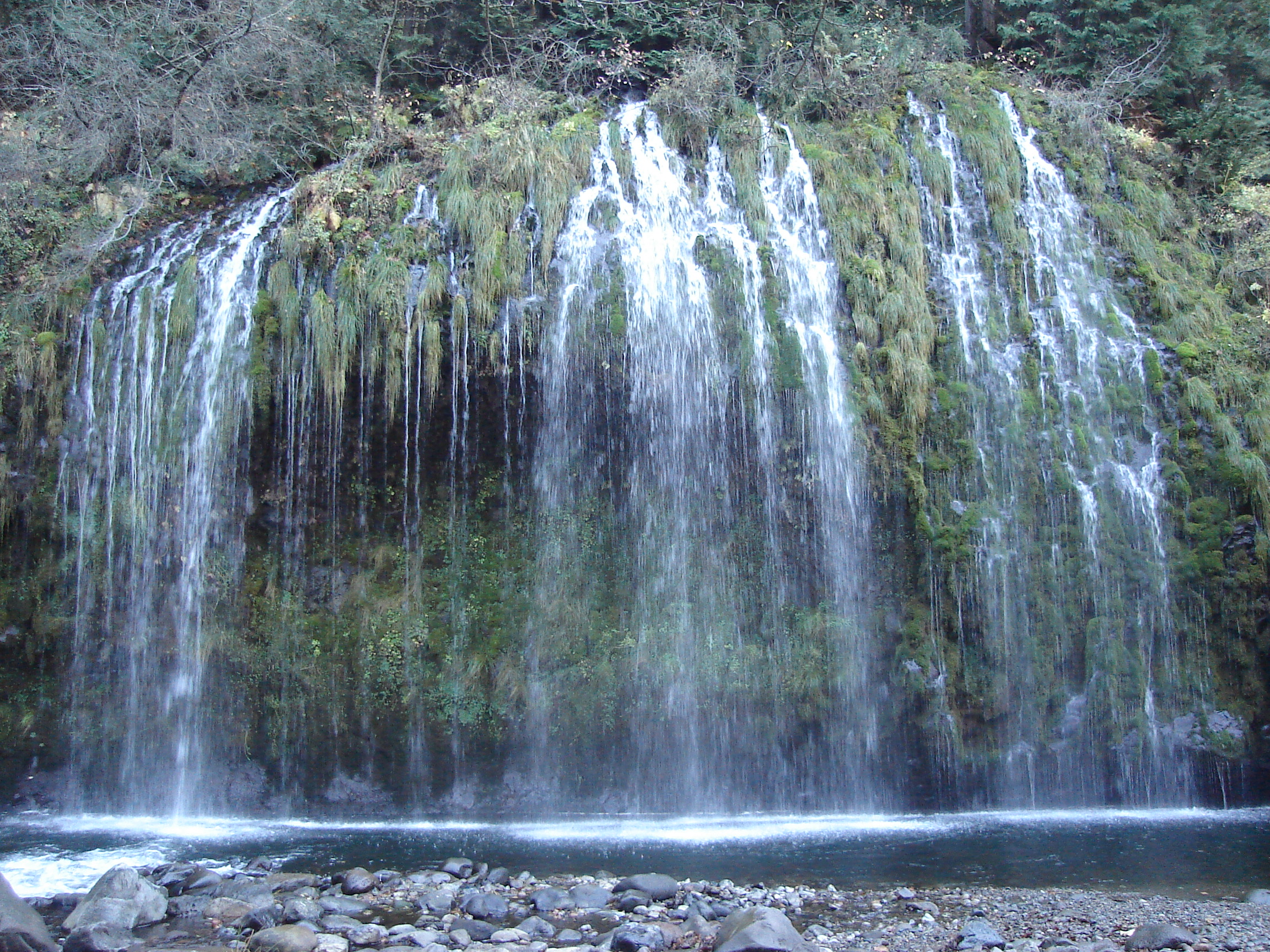
Mossbrae Falls, near north Dunsmuir

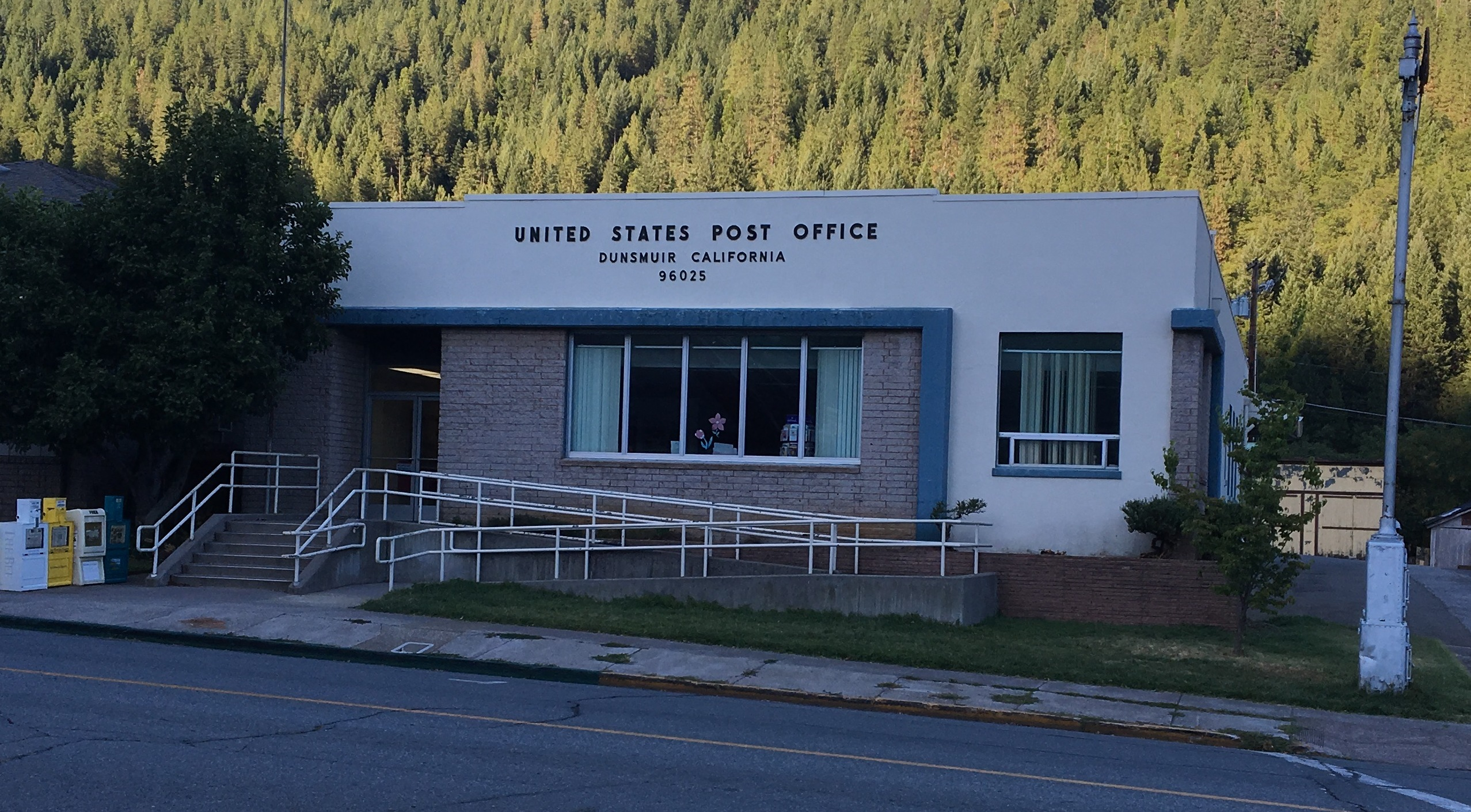
Post office in Dunsmuir

Sites in and near Dunsmuir have been inhabited for over 5000 years. At least three waves of early peoples swept through area, establishing residence. At the time of the first European-American contact in the 1820s, the site of Dunsmuir was within the range of the Okwanuchu tribe of Native Americans.

During the 1820s, early European-American hunters and trappers passed through Dunsmuir's site, following the Siskiyou Trail. In the mid-1830s, pioneer horse and cattle drives came up the Sacramento Canyon, delivering livestock from Mexican California to the new settlements in the Oregon Country to the north. In 1841, an overland party of the famous United States Exploring Expedition passed through the area.

The California Gold Rush led to increased traffic along the Siskiyou Trail through Dunsmuir's site, leading to the first non-Native American settlers at Upper Soda Springs in north Dunsmuir in the early 1850s. The discovery of gold at Yreka, California dramatically increased movement through the site of Dunsmuir, and a toll bridge and stagecoach hotel were built at Upper Soda Springs.

In 1887, the completion of the Central Pacific Railroad along the line of the Siskiyou Trail led to the creation of the modern town of Dunsmuir. The railroad developed a division point on the flats south of Upper Soda Springs, where railroad steam engines would be serviced, and added to trains to push them up the steep grades north of town. A roundhouse and turntable were built. All this activity required the creation of a town, initially known as 'Poverty Flats' or 'Pusher'. South of the present downtown and north of Castella is an area known as Nutglade, which was previously known as Dunsmuir and before that, Cedar Flat. So the name moved north from the South rail yard to the main rail yard. During the railroad heyday, Dunsmuir was the largest town in this County which is the size of Delaware and Rhode Island combined.

In 1888, Alexander Dunsmuir, second son of British Columbian coal baron Robert Dunsmuir, was passing through, and according to contemporary accounts, was so taken with the beauty of the area that he offered to donate a fountain to the new town, if they would rename the town in his honor.

By the early 1900s, Dunsmuir was the largest town in Siskiyou County, and for a long time had been the largest California city north of Sacramento. The construction of the Pacific Highway along the Siskiyou Trail in the mid-1910s brought more tourists. By the mid-1950s, the railroad transitioned from steam to diesel locomotives, and the substantial workforce in Dunsmuir was not needed, resulting in the town's contraction. Interstate 5 runs through the canyon along with the railroad and the upper Sacramento River.

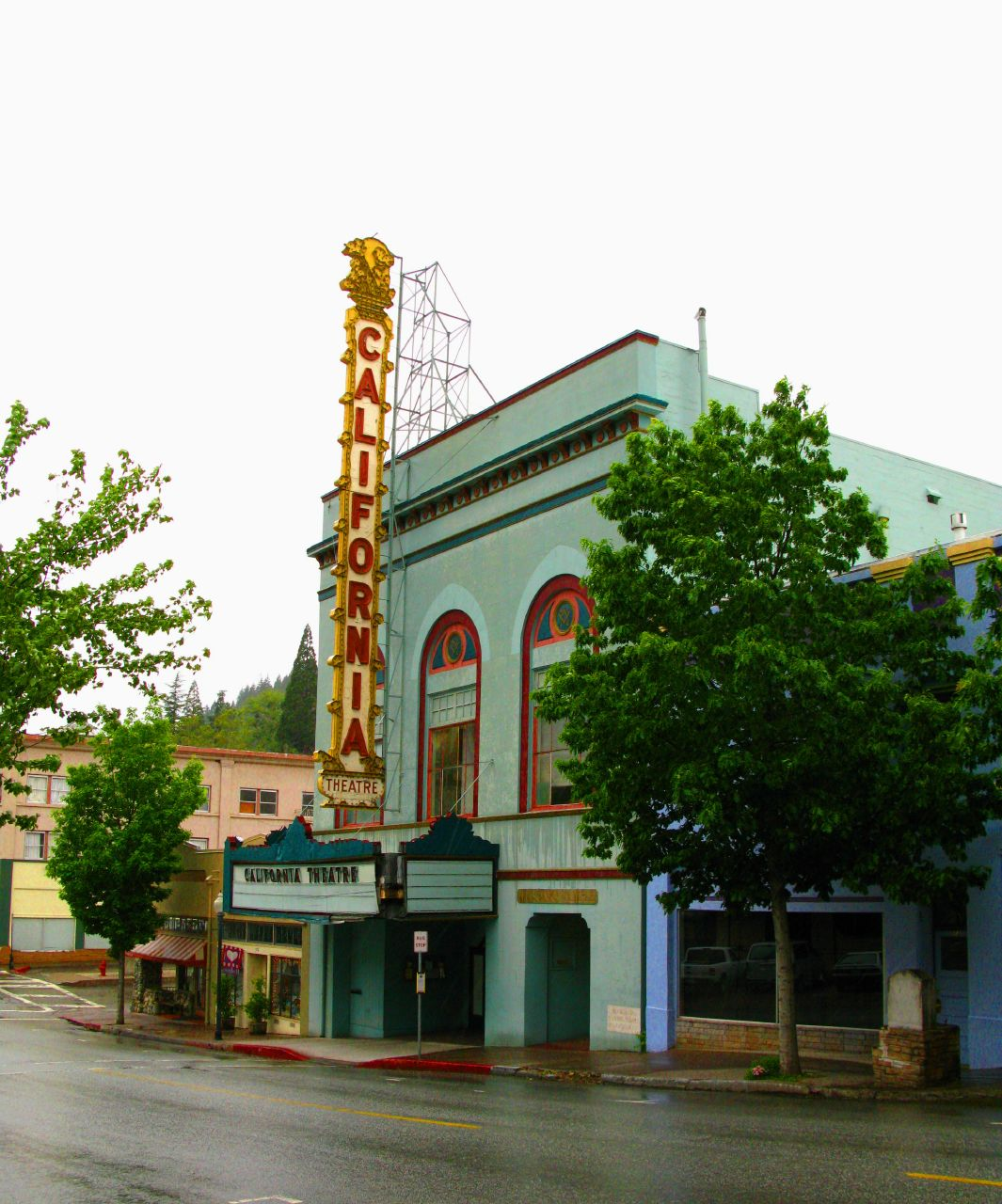
California Theater

As a result, Dunsmuir retains today much of the charm and scale of the 1920s and 1930s, and has been designated on the National Register of Historic Places. The downtown area is now a designated historic district. The California Theater, after fifty years without an organ, were able to acquire and re-install their original Wurlitzer instrument.

In July 1935, two fugitives were passing through town. Police Chief F.R. "Jack" Daw, and California Highway Patrol Officer C. "Doc" Malone went to catch them. The criminals ambushed the officers wounding Officer Malone and killing Chief Daw. One of the criminals, Clyde Johnson, was caught and put in jail in Yreka to await trial. A group of vigilantes from Dunsmuir went to Yreka, broke Johnson out of jail and lynched him. To this day the identity of those vigilantes has never been formally acknowledged. It is said to have been the last public lynching in California.

=== California's largest hazardous chemical spill ===
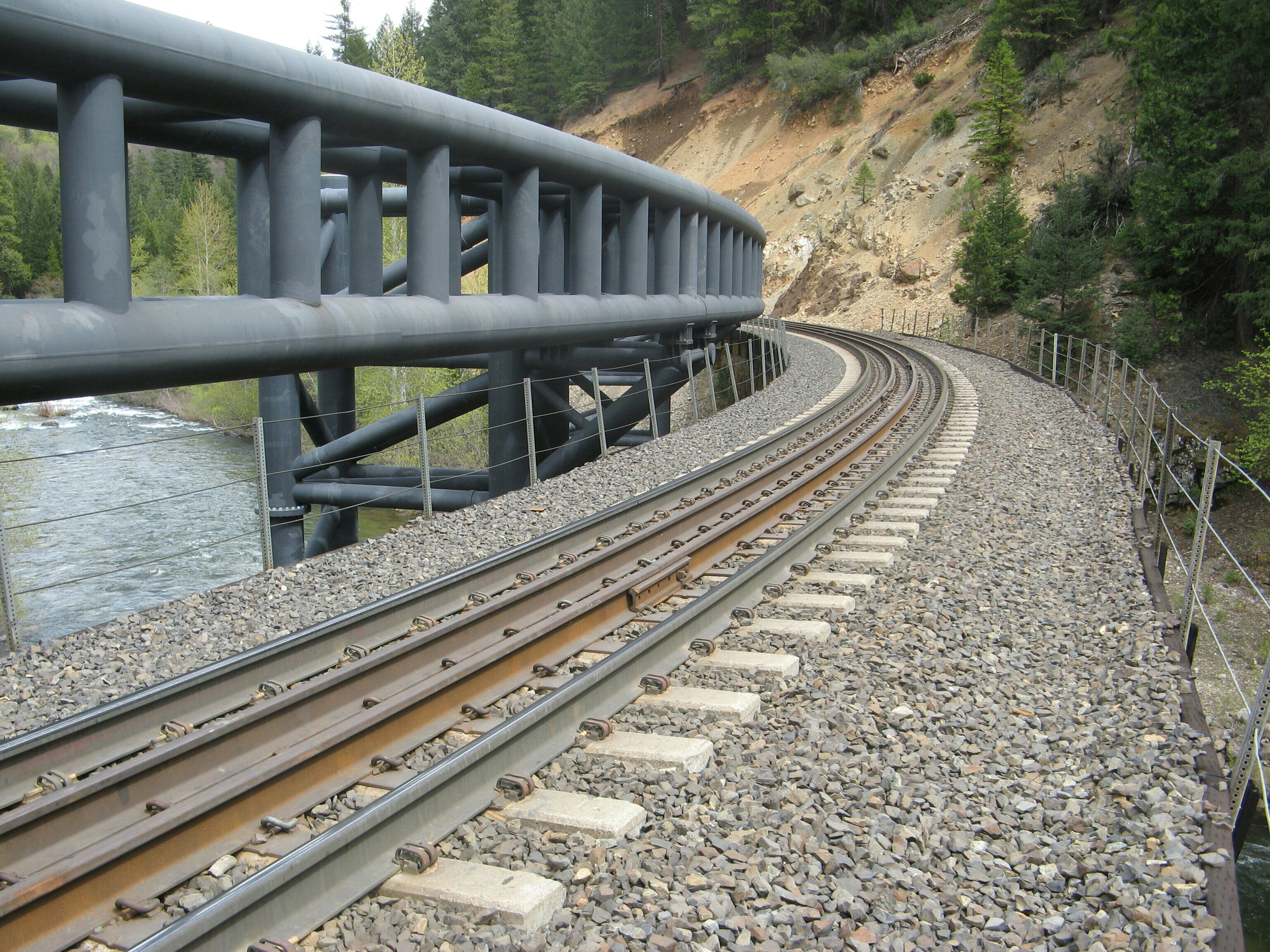
Site of the 1991 spill. Guardrail on left was constructed after the spill.

On the night of July 14, 1991, a Southern Pacific train derailed into the upper Sacramento River at a horseshoe curve of track known as the Cantara Loop, upstream from Dunsmuir. Several cars made contact with the water, including a tank car. On the morning of July 15, it became apparent that the tank car had ruptured and spilled its entire contents into the river – approximately 19,000 gallons of the soil fumigant metam sodium. Ultimately, over a million fish, and tens of thousands of amphibians and crayfish were killed. Millions of aquatic invertebrates, including insects and mollusks, which form the basis of the river's ecosystem, were destroyed. Hundreds of thousands of willows, alders, and cottonwoods eventually died. Many more were severely injured. The chemical plume left a 41-mile wake of destruction, from the spill site to the entry point of the river into Shasta Lake. The accident still ranks as the largest hazardous chemical spill in California history.

The Upper Sacramento River is now largely recovered from the spill though some species (crayfish and frogs) have not yet come back. The watershed is carefully stewarded by The Upper Sacramento River Exchange. The popular fishery is again healthy. Recent changes to angling regulations have opened the Upper Sacramento River to catch-and-release fishing all year round. Five-pound trout have often been caught right in the city.

== City parks and botanical gardens ==
Dunsmuir has numerous parks located throughout the city.

Dunsmuir City Park and Botanical Gardens is a 10-acre (4.0 ha) municipal park and botanical garden maintained by Dunsmuir Botanical Gardens Inc., a non-profit 501(c)(3) organization of volunteers within Dunsmuir City Park. It requires public support to maintain the Gardens, which are on City of Dunsmuir property under the general control of Siskiyou County, via the Board of Directors of the Dunsmuir Park & Recreation District. In 1924, New York Yankees Babe Ruth and Bob Meusel visited the park as part of a barnstorming tour, playing an exhibition baseball game against Dunsmuir locals.

Tauhindauli Park and Trail is on the former site of Upper Soda Springs resort along the Sacramento River canyon. It consists of approximately 10 acres (4.0 ha) of level ground on the bank of the river, the surrounding hillsides, and continues north along the eastern bank of the Sacramento River to the Dunsmuir City Park, in the heart of Dunsmuir. Long a local fishing spot, swimming hole, and site of both historical and ecological significance, the site has been improved to enhance its recreational opportunities and aesthetics. Environmental work and levee restructuring has improved flood control for the entire town. The Tauhindauli river restoration project created a park with pathways winding through native grasses and plants, with fishing access and picnic areas. For ecological and flood-control purposes, riparian forests and meadows have been restored close to their original condition. Levees have been moved and built up for maximum protection for the park from river erosion and to restore the watershed to the natural habitat which provides food for animals. The Park can be accessed from River Avenue. to the south and Stagecoach Road to Upper Soda Springs Road in the canyon. Tauhindauli Park and Trail was a project of the Dunsmuir Garden Club. Funding for this project came principally from the Cantara Trustee Council and the California Department of Fish and Wildlife.

== Historic resorts ==
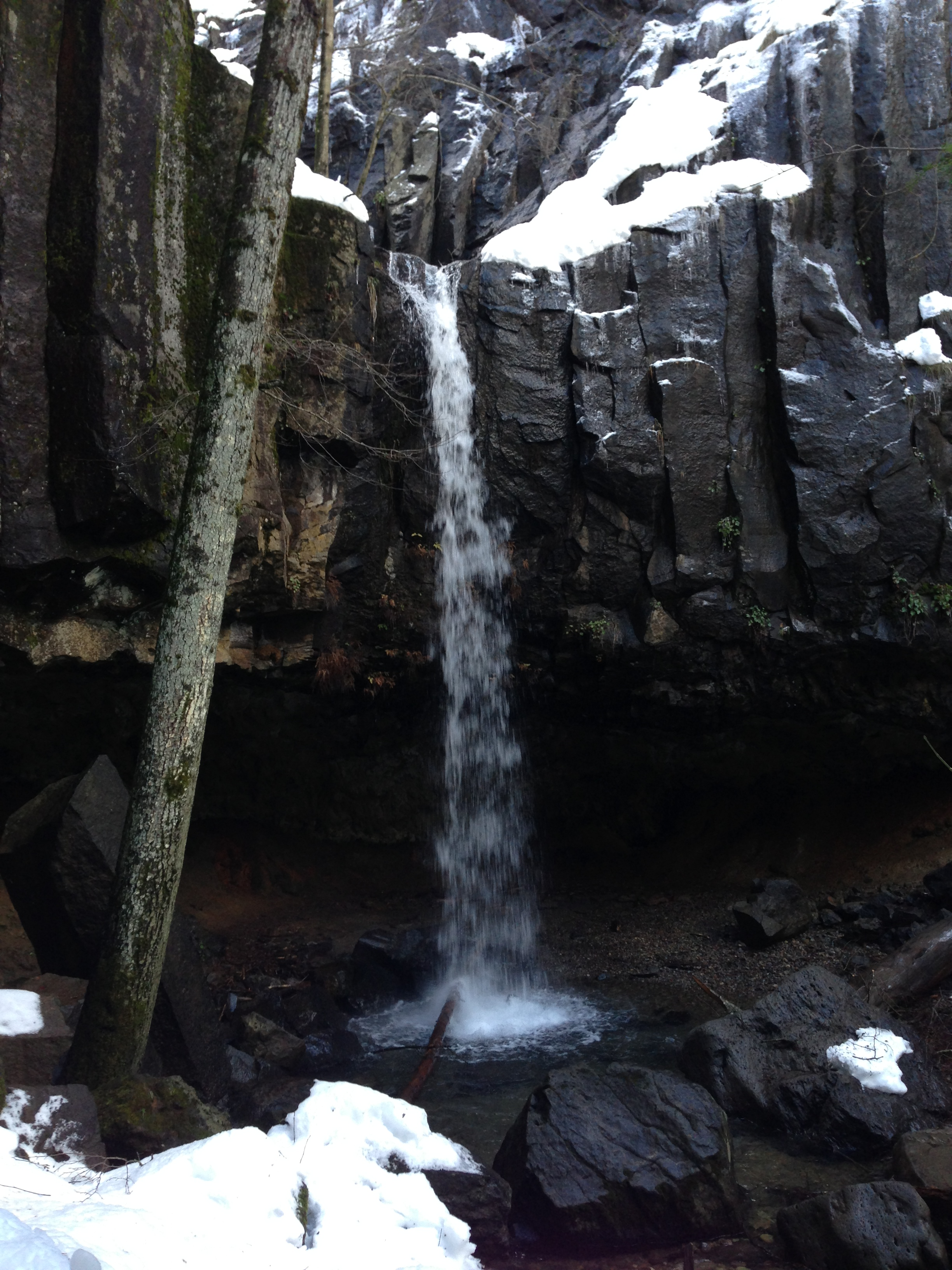
Hedge Creek Falls

Shasta Springs was the name of a popular summer resort on the Upper Sacramento River, during the late Nineteenth Century and early Twentieth Century. It was located just north of the City of Dunsmuir, California and just north of Upper Soda Springs along the Siskiyou Trail in northern California

Upper Soda Springs is on the banks of the Sacramento River in Dunsmuir, California. It consists of approximately ten acres (40,000 m^{2}) of level ground on both sides of the river, the surrounding hillsides, and continues north along the eastern bank of the Sacramento River to the Dunsmuir City Park. The State of California and the City of Dunsmuir are creating a new park on this historic site. The Upper Soda Springs site contains a riparian ecosystem and includes its namesake mineral water springs. In large part because of its location on the Siskiyou Trail, the site mirrors the history of the state and of the American West.

== Waterfalls ==
Mossbrae Falls is a waterfall flowing into the Upper Sacramento River, in the Shasta Cascade area in Dunsmuir, California. The falls are located just south of the lower portion of Shasta Springs. Access to the falls via a mile-long hiking trail on the Union Pacific Railroad tracks is currently closed, as Union Pacific and the City of Dunsmuir figure out a safer route to the falls.

Hedge Creek Falls is a waterfall on Hedge Creek, in the Shasta Cascade area in Dunsmuir, California. There is a small cave located behind the waterfall, allowing visitors to walk behind the cascading water. Shortly after the waterfall, Hedge Creek flows into the Sacramento River south of Mossbrae Falls. There is a viewing platform over the river, with a view of Mount Shasta. Access to the waterfall and viewing platform is via a short hiking trail. The trail starts at a small park off the Dunsmuir Ave/Siskiyou Ave exit on Interstate 5. The close proximity to Interstate 5 makes the waterfall a very popular stopping point for passing motorists. Charles E. Bolton, better known as Black Bart, robbed the Roseburg, Oregon to Redding, California stage near Dunsmuir on October 25, 1879. Evidence found at the time indicated that Bart hid in the shallow cave behind the falls prior to the holdup. This was one of three holdups committed by Black Bart in this area. Normally he operated much further south.

== Climate ==
Dunsmuir has an oceanic Mediterranean climate (Köppen: Csb, bordering on Csa), featuring cool, wet winters and hot, dry summers with cool mornings. Its temperatures are similar to those of the nearby cities of Yreka and Medford (about 90 miles or 140 km north in the state of Oregon) but Dunsmuir receives three-and-a-half times as much precipitation. There are an average of 59 afternoons with highs at or above 90 °F (32.2 °C) and an average of 104 mornings with lows of 32 °F (0 °C) or lower, using the most recent 1991–2020 climate period. The record high of 109 °F (42.8 °C) has occurred on four separate occasions: August 8, 1981; August 9, 1984; July 30, 2022; and July 31, 2022, and the record low of 4 °F (−16 °C) occurred on December 21, 1990. The warmest overnight low was 71 °F (22 °C) on June 26, 1981, and the coldest afternoon high was 17 °F (−8 °C) on December 21, 1990. The average dates of the first and last freeze are October 20 and April 24, respectively. Despite the long freeze period, extreme cold is uncommon, and some winters go without seeing a single night fall below 20 °F (−7 °C). This most recently occurred during the winter of 2019–2020.

The average annual precipitation is 63.33 inches (1,608.6 mm), with over 50% falling in just three months: December, January, and February. There are an average of 98 days with measurable precipitation. The wettest "water year" was from October 1982 to September 1983 with 111.14 inches (2,823.0 mm) and the driest from October 2020 to September 2021 with 27.28 inches (692.9 mm). The most rainfall in one month was 40.81 inches (1,036.6 mm) in January 1995. The most rainfall in one calendar day was 6.44 inches (163.6 mm) on December 31, 1996. Snowfall averages 26.7 inches (68 cm), falling on 13 days. The most snowfall in one season was 103.1 inches (262 cm) from July 2022 to June 2023, and the least snowfall in one season was 1.5 inches (3.8 cm) from July 2014 to June 2015. The most snowfall in one day is 30.0 inches (76 cm) on February 24, 2023.

Climate data for DUNSMUIR TRTMT PL, CA (1991-2020 normals, extremes 1978-)
Month	Jan	Feb	Mar	Apr	May	Jun	Jul	Aug	Sep	Oct	Nov	Dec	Year
Record high °F (°C)	70 (21)	78 (26)	83 (28)	92 (33)	99 (37)	105 (41)	109 (43)	109 (43)	106 (41)	99 (37)	81 (27)	75 (24)	109 (43)
Mean maximum °F (°C)	62 (17)	68 (20)	75 (24)	83 (28)	90 (32)	97 (36)	101 (38)	101 (38)	97 (36)	87 (31)	73 (23)	61 (16)	103 (39)
Mean daily maximum °F (°C)	48.6 (9.2)	52.4 (11.3)	57.2 (14.0)	63.3 (17.4)	72.8 (22.7)	81.2 (27.3)	89.9 (32.2)	89.1 (31.7)	83.5 (28.6)	70.9 (21.6)	56.3 (13.5)	47.7 (8.7)	67.7 (19.8)
Daily mean °F (°C)	39.3 (4.1)	41.6 (5.3)	45.3 (7.4)	50.2 (10.1)	58.4 (14.7)	65.7 (18.7)	71.9 (22.2)	70.3 (21.3)	64.9 (18.3)	55.1 (12.8)	44.9 (7.2)	38.9 (3.8)	53.9 (12.2)
Mean daily minimum °F (°C)	29.9 (−1.2)	30.8 (−0.7)	33.4 (0.8)	37.1 (2.8)	44.1 (6.7)	50.2 (10.1)	54.0 (12.2)	51.5 (10.8)	46.2 (7.9)	39.3 (4.1)	33.6 (0.9)	30.1 (−1.1)	40.0 (4.4)
Mean minimum °F (°C)	20 (−7)	23 (−5)	26 (−3)	29 (−2)	34 (1)	40 (4)	45 (7)	45 (7)	38 (3)	31 (−1)	25 (−4)	21 (−6)	17 (−8)
Record low °F (°C)	12 (−11)	8 (−13)	19 (−7)	22 (−6)	26 (−3)	33 (1)	39 (4)	41 (5)	31 (−1)	25 (−4)	18 (−8)	4 (−16)	4 (−16)
Average precipitation inches (mm)	11.08 (281)	10.46 (266)	9.20 (234)	4.90 (124)	2.83 (72)	1.33 (34)	0.15 (3.8)	0.20 (5.1)	0.68 (17)	3.04 (77)	6.89 (175)	12.57 (319)	63.33 (1,609)
Average snowfall inches (cm)	10.2 (26)	6.7 (17)	2.7 (6.9)	0.6 (1.5)	0.0 (0.0)	0.0 (0.0)	0.0 (0.0)	0.0 (0.0)	0.0 (0.0)	0.0 (0.0)	1.9 (4.8)	7.2 (18)	29.3 (74.2)
Average precipitation days (≥ 0.01 in)	14.7	12.8	13.2	11.4	7.7	4.0	1.3	1.3	2.3	5.6	10.3	13.8	98.4
Average snowy days (≥ 0.1 in)	3.7	2.5	1.3	0.5	0.0	0.0	0.0	0.0	0.0	0.0	1.0	3.4	12.4
Source: NOAA

== Geography ==
Dunsmuir is located at 41°13′18″N 122°16′23″W.

According to the United States Census Bureau, the city has a total area of 1.6 square miles (4.1 km^{2}), of which 97.86% is land and 2.14% is water.

At an elevation of approximately 2,350 feet (720 m) above sea level, a unique setting is created by the Sacramento River in which class 3 whitewater rapids are usually created during summer run off through a town of about 2,000 residents. In plain view from some of the city's public streets, this may be one of the few places in western North America where three categories of "twos" (population, elevation, and whitewater difficulty) are met or eclipsed. (Eastern US example: the Cherry River at Richwood, WV)

Mt. Shasta's lava layers filter the drinking water and eliminate the need for filtration or treatment; thus the town's marketing slogan, "Home Of The Best Water On Earth". Three water fountains are located on Dunsmuir Avenue in the Historic District. Two of the fountains previously ran 24 hours a day, however have since been changed in 2015 to only flow on demand due to water conservation measures placed on the state of California by Governor Jerry Brown.

== Demographics ==
Historical population
Census	Pop.	Note	%±
1910	1,719		—
1920	2,528		47.1%
1930	2,610		3.2%
1940	2,359		−9.6%
1950	2,256		−4.4%
1960	2,873		27.3%
1970	2,214		−22.9%
1980	2,253		1.8%
1990	2,129		−5.5%
2000	1,923		−9.7%
2010	1,650		−14.2%
2020	1,707		3.5%
U.S. Decennial Census

=== 2020 census ===
As of the 2020 census, Dunsmuir had a population of 1,707. The population density was 1,064.2 inhabitants per square mile (410.9/km^{2}). The median age was 47.9 years. The age distribution was 302 people (17.7%) under the age of 18, 113 people (6.6%) aged 18 to 24, 380 people (22.3%) aged 25 to 44, 471 people (27.6%) aged 45 to 64, and 441 people (25.8%) who were 65 years of age or older. For every 100 females, there were 102.0 males, and for every 100 females age 18 and over there were 103.0 males.

The Census reported that all residents lived in households. There were 798 households, out of which 191 (23.9%) had children under the age of 18 living in them, 269 (33.7%) were married-couple households, 86 (10.8%) were cohabiting couple households, 226 (28.3%) had a female householder with no spouse or partner present, and 217 (27.2%) had a male householder with no spouse or partner present. 278 households (34.8%) were one person, and 127 (15.9%) were one person aged 65 or older. The average household size was 2.14. There were 437 families (54.8% of all households).

There were 1,091 housing units at an average density of 680.2 units per square mile (262.6 units/km^{2}), of which 798 (73.1%) were occupied. Of occupied units, 439 (55.0%) were owner-occupied, and 359 (45.0%) were occupied by renters. Of all housing units, 26.9% were vacant. The homeowner vacancy rate was 0.2% and the rental vacancy rate was 3.5%.

0.0% of residents lived in urban areas, while 100.0% lived in rural areas.

Racial composition as of the 2020 census
Race	Number	Percent
White	1,404	82.2%
Black or African American	18	1.1%
American Indian and Alaska Native	30	1.8%
Asian	23	1.3%
Native Hawaiian and Other Pacific Islander	1	0.1%
Some other race	53	3.1%
Two or more races	178	10.4%
Hispanic or Latino (of any race)	202	11.8%

=== Income and poverty ===
In 2023, the US Census Bureau estimated that the median household income was $47,708, and the per capita income was $40,124. About 7.2% of families and 13.1% of the population were below the poverty line.

=== 2010 census ===
The 2010 United States census reported a population of 1,650. The population density was 951.0 inhabitants per square mile (367.2/km^{2}). The racial makeup of Dunsmuir was 1,443 (87.5%) White, 32 (1.9%) African American, 17 (1.0%) Native American, 15 (0.9%) Asian, 4 (0.2%) Pacific Islander, 30 (1.8%) from other races, and 109 (6.6%) from two or more races. Hispanic or Latino of any race were 167 persons (10.1%).

The Census reported that 1,650 people (100% of the population) lived in households, 0 (0%) lived in non-institutionalized group quarters, and 0 (0%) were institutionalized.

There were 763 households, out of which 180 (23.6%) had children under the age of 18 living in them, 276 (36.2%) were opposite-sex married couples living together, 84 (11.0%) had a female householder with no husband present, 51 (6.7%) had a male householder with no wife present. There were 80 (10.5%) unmarried opposite-sex partnerships, and 6 (0.8%) same-sex married couples or partnerships. 271 households (35.5%) were made up of individuals, and 99 (13.0%) had someone living alone who was 65 years of age or older. The average household size was 2.16. There were 411 families (53.9% of all households); the average family size was 2.77.

The population was spread out, with 320 people (19.4%) under the age of 18, 110 people (6.7%) aged 18 to 24, 354 people (21.5%) aged 25 to 44, 584 people (35.4%) aged 45 to 64, and 282 people (17.1%) who were 65 years of age or older. The median age was 47.0 years. For every 100 females, there were 105.7 males. For every 100 females age 18 and over, there were 101.2 males.

There were 1,110 housing units at an average density of 639.8 units per square mile (247.0 units/km^{2}), of which 416 (54.5%) were owner-occupied, and 347 (45.5%) were occupied by renters. The homeowner vacancy rate was 2.8%; the rental vacancy rate was 15.6%. 886 people (53.7% of the population) lived in owner-occupied housing units and 764 people (46.3%) lived in rental housing units.

== Government ==
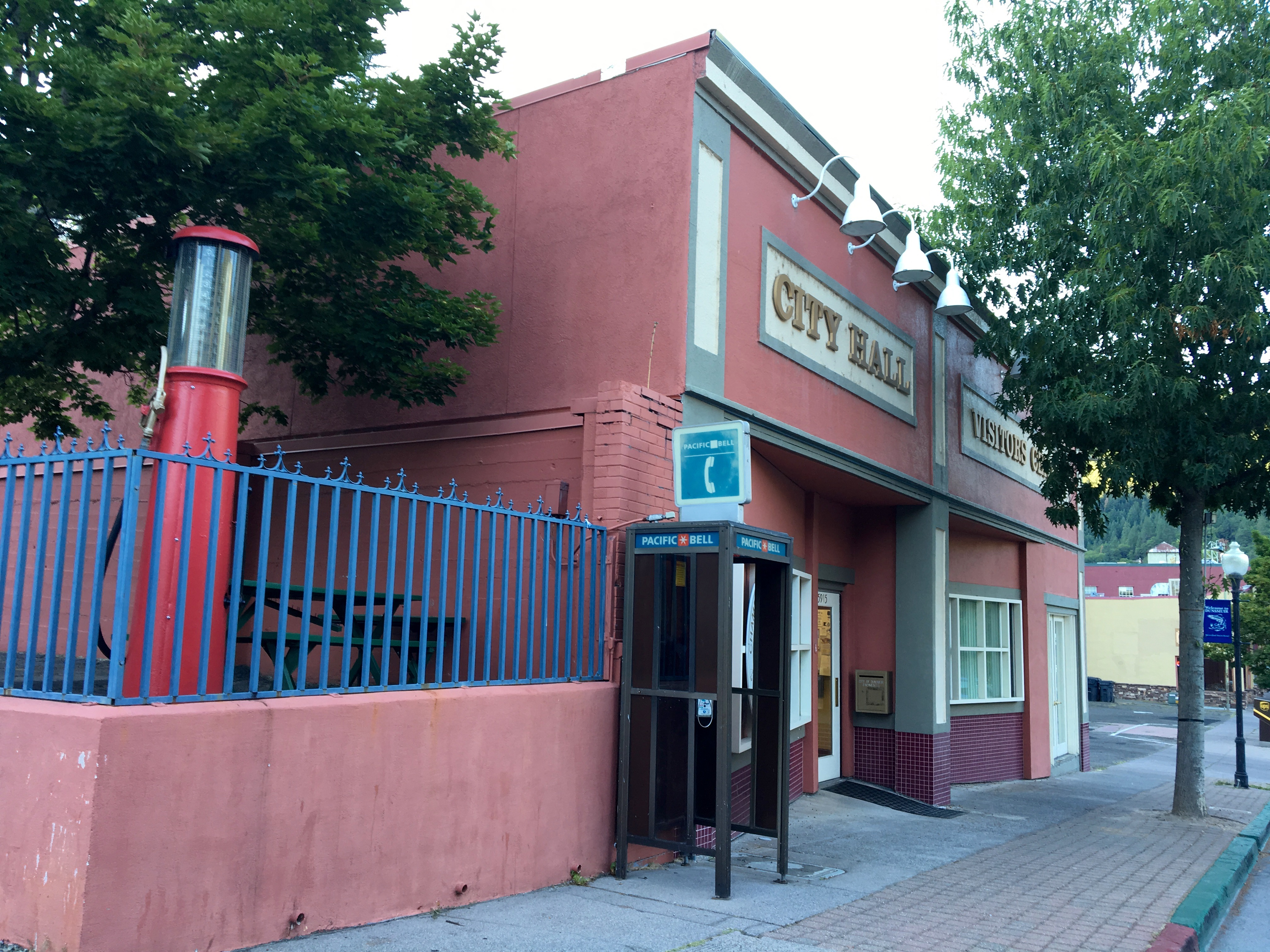
Dunsmuir City Hall

Dunsmuir has a City Manager form of government with an elected five-person Council, a Chamber of Commerce, a mayor, and two school districts. The current mayor is Michael Clarno.

The Dunsmuir Fire Department and The Dunsmuir Fire Protection District operate together under a Joint Powers Authority (JPA). The department has an automatic aid agreement with the Castella Fire District and all three are overseen by a single Fire Chief. The fire department runs on average 400 to 500 calls per year. The original city fire department was founded in 1897.

In 1992 the City of Dunsmuir Police Department was disbanded and law enforcement services for the city were contracted to the Siskiyou County Sheriff Department. Dunsmuir contracts for 7,200 hours of service per year which provides the city with a Sergeant and four Deputy Sheriffs. The sheriff department answers around 2,500 calls for service annually.

=== State and federal representation ===
In the California State Legislature, Dunsmuir is in the 1st senatorial district, represented by Republican Megan Dahle, and the 1st Assembly district, represented by Republican Heather Hadwick.

In the United States House of Representatives, Dunsmuir is in California's 1st congressional district, represented by Republican James Gallagher.

== Transportation ==
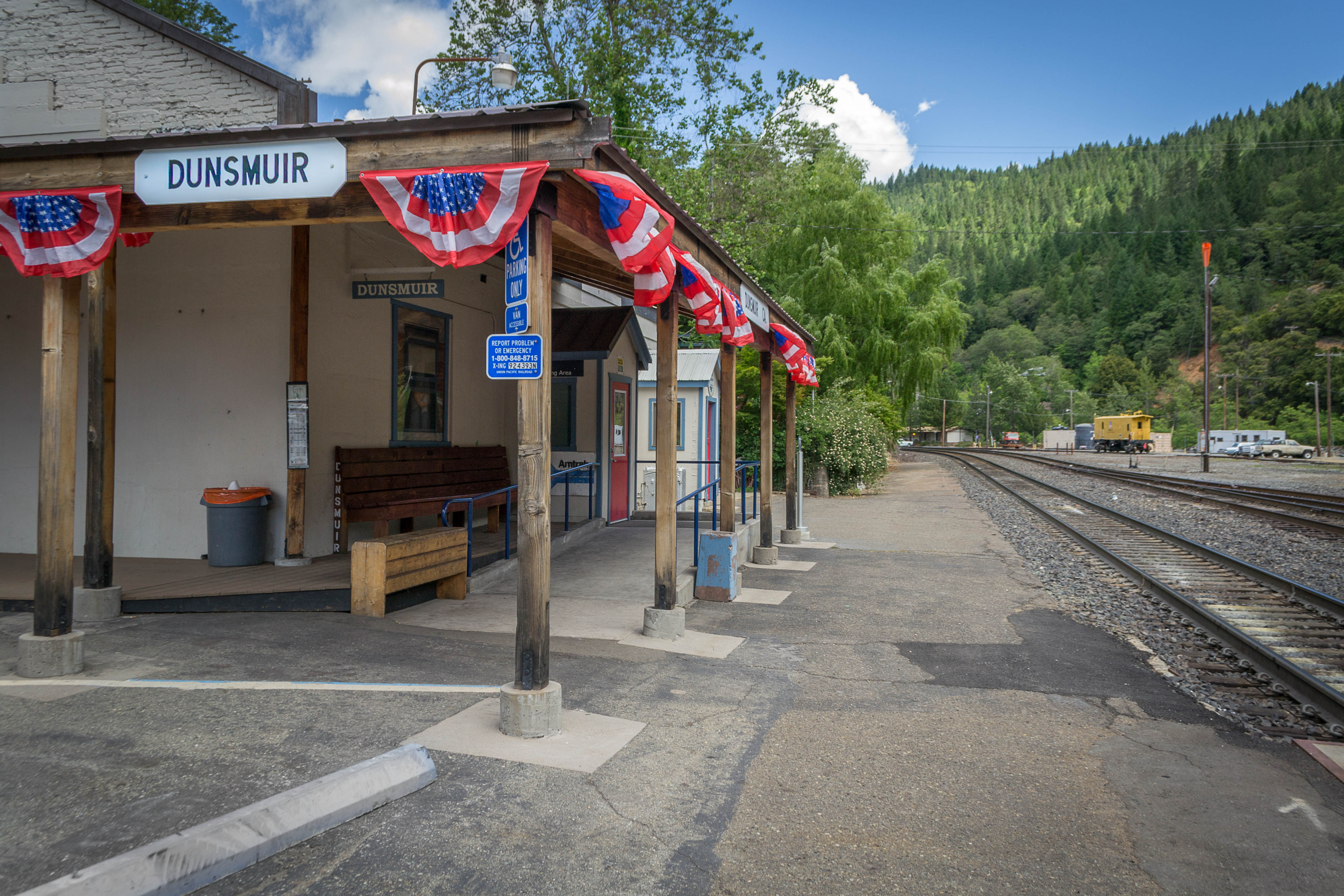
The Amtrak station in Dunsmuir

Amtrak's Coast Starlight stops daily in both directions at the Dunsmuir Amtrak station, located on one of Dunsmuir's two commercial streets, both in the historic district. This is the only stop in Siskiyou County, and the northernmost Amtrak station in California, located at a midpoint between Redding and Klamath Falls, Oregon. The County bus service, the Stage, from Dunsmuir north through the county (Mt. Shasta, Weed, Yreka, etc.) connects to Amtrak. The station is maintained by city residents and local rail enthusiasts, and includes a museum, telephones, restrooms and shelter from the weather. The town itself is a railroad museum with an operating turntable.

The city is bisected by Interstate 5, linking Yreka and Oregon to the north, and Redding and Sacramento to the south. Dunsmuir Municipal-Mott Airport is the city-owned public-use airport, located 3 nautical miles (5.6 km; 3.5 mi) north of the central business district.

== Notable residents ==
- Ray Coleman, Major League Baseball outfielder, was born in Dunsmuir.
- Nick Eddy, professional football player, was born in Dunsmuir.
- Ernie Wasson, horticulturist and author, lives in Dunsmuir.
- Robert Williams, astronomer and former president of the International Astronomical Union, was born in Dunsmuir.

== In popular culture ==
- Gerrold, David (September–October 2016). "The Dunsmuir Horror". Fantasy & Science Fiction Magazine. 131: 136. The central conceit of the story is that the town of Dunsmuir is comparable to Brigadoon in that it exists only intermittently.

== See also ==
- Castle Crags
- Dunsmuir Botanical Gardens
- Hedge Creek Falls
- Mossbrae Falls
- Shasta Springs
- Siskiyou County, California
- Upper Soda Springs
