= Dunsmuir Municipal-Mott Airport =

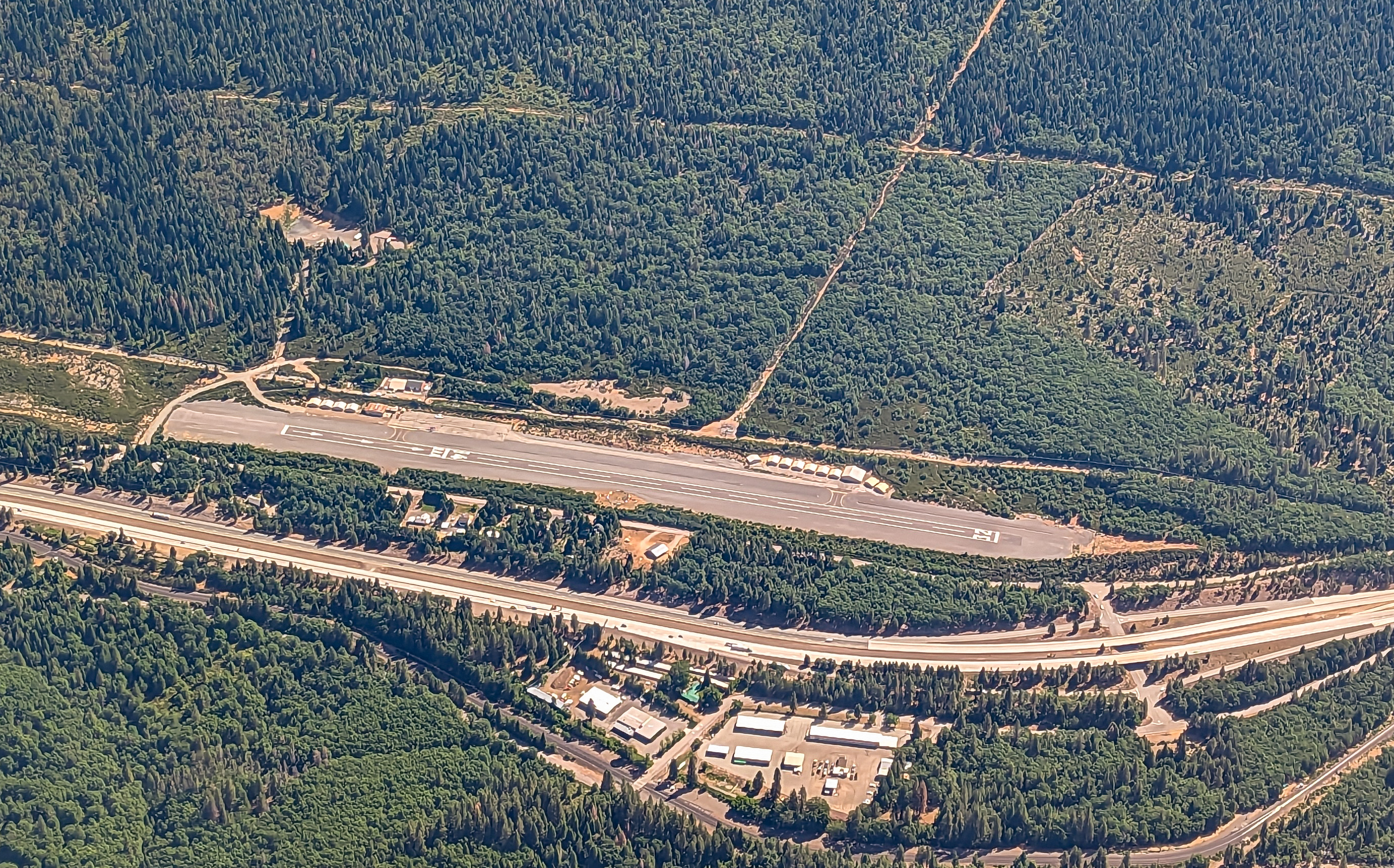
- Dunsmuir Airport aerial view
- IATA: MHS; ICAO: KMHS; FAA LID: 1O6

Summary
- Airport type: Public
- Owner: City of Dunsmuir
- Serves: Dunsmuir, California
- Elevation AMSL: 3,258 ft (993 m)
- Coordinates: 41°15′47″N 122°16′20″W
- Interactive map of Dunsmuir Municipal-Mott Airport

Runways
Direction	Length		Surface
Direction	ft	m	Surface
14/32	2,700	823	Asphalt

Statistics (2007)
- Aircraft operations: 500
- Based aircraft: 20
- Source: Federal Aviation Administration

Dunsmuir Municipal-Mott Airport (IATA: MHS, ICAO: KMHS, FAA LID: 1O6) is three miles north of Dunsmuir, in Siskiyou County, California. It was built as an auxiliary airfield on the San Francisco - Seattle airway.

== Facilities ==
The airport covers 126 acres (51 ha) at an elevation of 3,258 feet (993 m). Its one runway, 14/32, is 2,700 by 60 ft (823 x 18 m) asphalt.

In 2007 the airport had 500 aircraft operations, average 41 per month, all general aviation. 20 aircraft were then based at the airport, all single-engine.
