= Lake Siskiyou =

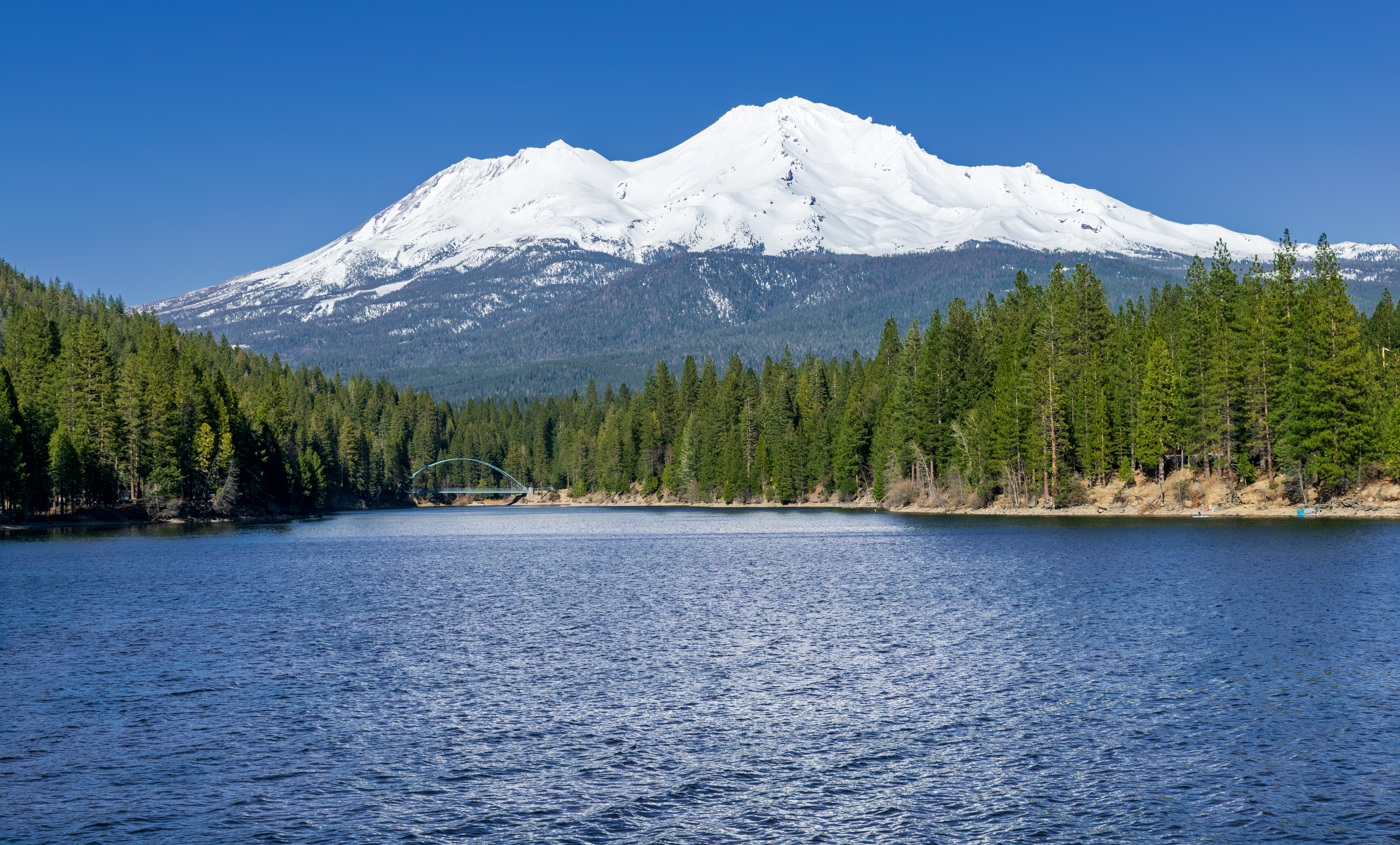
- with Mount Shasta in the distance.

- Location within California Location within the United States
- Location: Siskiyou County, California
- Coordinates: 41°17′00″N 122°20′21″W
- Type: Reservoir
- Primary inflows: Sacramento River
- Primary outflows: Sacramento River
- Basin countries: United States
- Max. length: 1.62 mi (2.61 km)
- Max. width: 1.39 mi (2.24 km)
- Surface area: 430 acres (170 ha)
- Water volume: 26,000 acre⋅ft (32,000,000 m^{3})
- Surface elevation: 3,185 ft (971 m)
- Settlements: Mount Shasta, California

Lake Siskiyou is a reservoir formed by Box Canyon Dam on the Sacramento River, in far northern California, near the town of Mount Shasta, California. It is the site of local recreation, as well as being used for watershed protection and flood control.

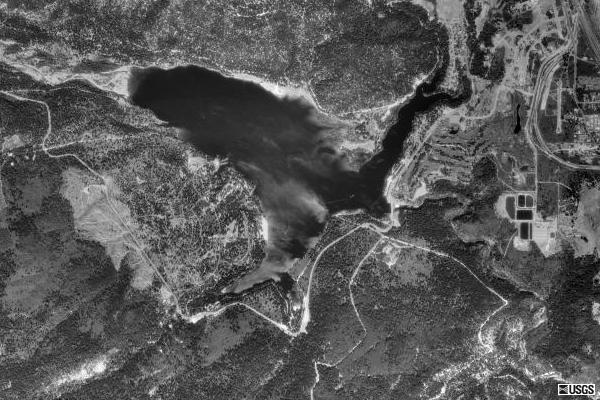
Satellite view

== History ==
Lake Siskiyou was created as part of The Box Creek Dam project, a subset of the California State Water Project subsequent to the passage of the Burns-Porter Act. The lake was purchased by the state using eminent domain from the local Boss and Spini families, who used the area for their ranches prior to the dam's construction.

== Wagon Creek Bridge ==
In late 2010 a walking bridge over the wagon creek inlet was completed, finishing a trail that wraps around the entire lake. The cost of the bridge was $2.8 million; funding was obtained from the McConnell Foundation, The State of California and federal stimulus funds. The McConnell Foundation also provided funds for the Sundial Bridge in Redding, California.

== See also ==
- List of dams and reservoirs in California
- List of lakes in California
