= Upper Soda Springs =

Park in Dunsmuir, California

Coordinates: 41°13′19″N 122°16′37″W

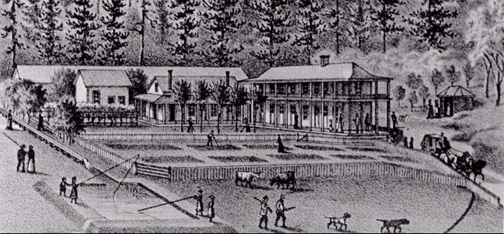
Engraving of the Upper Soda Springs Resort, circa 1875-1880

Upper Soda Springs is on the banks of the Sacramento River in Dunsmuir, California, USA. It consists of approximately 15 acres (60,000 m^{2}) of level ground on both sides of the River, the surrounding hillsides, and continues north along the eastern bank of the Sacramento River to the Dunsmuir City Park. The State of California and the City of Dunsmuir oversee a public park on this historic site. The Upper Soda Springs site contains a riparian ecosystem and includes its namesake mineral water springs. In large part because of its location on the Siskiyou Trail, the site mirrors the history of the state and of the American West.

== Before the California Gold Rush ==
Before the California Gold Rush, the site had no permanent inhabitants. The nearest inhabitants, members of the Okwanuchu tribe, used the site as a temporary campground during the annual salmon fishing season due to the locations most wide and shallow location on the river, which inhabitants called "place to cross the river". Another nearby tribe, the Wintu, likely did not have regular habitation sites this far north along the Sacramento.

The first European or American visitors in the area were likely hunters and trappers, including Hudson's Bay Company hunting and trapping parties headed by Michel Laframboise, coming down from the Pacific Northwest during the 1820s-30s. As early as the 1830s, a pioneer cattle drive led by Ewing Young, along what was to become known as the Siskiyou Trail from Mexican-controlled California to settlements in Oregon, stopped at Upper Soda Springs. In 1841, an overland party of the United States Exploring Expedition with cartographers and botanists entered the upper Sacramento River canyon, and recorded visits to mineral springs sites on the upper Sacramento River, including passing through Upper Soda Springs.

== During and after the Gold Rush ==
The discovery of gold at Sutter's Mill in 1848, brought the Forty-Niners to California in search of riches during the California Gold Rush. For the next ten years, these prospectors spread from the original Gold Country region of the Sierra Nevada throughout the state. Discovery of gold near Yreka, California in 1851 greatly increased the traffic between California's Central Valley and Yreka, and north into Oregon and Washington.

Packers with mule trains joined the prospectors heading north, following existing Native American foot trails through rugged mountains, including the Sacramento River canyon. A rustic wayside hostel for these travelers was the first permanent habitation on the site, established in the early 1850s. During this same time, a band of Wintu, fleeing the predation of the Forty-Niners on the Trinity River, crossed the mountains, and settled near the springs.

In about 1855, a toll bridge crossing the Sacramento River was built on the site by pioneers Ross McCloud and Mary Campbell McCloud. During the next 30 years, the first stagecoach road between the Central Valley and Oregon passed through the site and a more substantial inn was developed, with a covered "springhouse" to allow the public to enjoy the "soda water" from the mineral springs (on the far right in the image above.) Notably, the name "Dolly Varden trout" was first given to a colorful local fish species by Elda McCloud, the daughter of Ross and Mary McCloud.

The arrival of the Central Pacific railroad in 1886 heralded still further expansion of the inn. The railroad and lumber mills brought many jobs to the area, and at one point Dunsmuir was the largest city in California north of Sacramento (5,000 or so) Now known as the Upper Soda Springs Resort, it was a destination for well-to-do Victorian Era travelers who would come to "take the waters" at the mineral springs.

With the increasing usage of the automobile in the 20th century, vacation tastes changed, and the Resort closed by 1920. The property was subdivided, and became private residences and businesses.

== Modern era ==
Beginning in the late 1990s, through public and private efforts, riverside parcels of the historic Upper Soda Springs Resort property were acquired and dedicated to park land. After restoration and construction in the acquired property, Tauhindauli Park and Trail now exists on the section of the historic Resort property that is alongside the river.

== Tauhindauli Park and Trail ==
Tauhindauli Park and Trail has been developed along the beautiful Sacramento River on the former site of the Upper Soda Springs Resort in Dunsmuir, California. It consists of approximately one-half mile of riverside frontage, including approximately eleven acres of level ground alongside the river, and approximately three acres north along the eastern banks of the river to the Dunsmuir City Park in north Dunsmuir. Long a favorite local fishing spot, swimming hole, and a site of both historical and ecological significance, this special place has been improved to enhance its recreational opportunities and esthetics. Environmental work and levee restructuring was done which improved flood control for downstream communities. This is a river restoration project which has created a natural park with pathways that wind through native grasses and plants, no manicured lawns can be found.

Walking trails, fishing access, and picnic areas are available so the natural beauty of the Sacramento River can be enjoyed to the fullest. For ecological and flood purposes, riparian forests and meadows have been restored close to their original condition. Levees have been moved and built up for maximum protection for the Park from river erosion and to restore the watershed to the natural habitat which provides food and shelter for insects, birds, and other wildlife. The Park can be accessed from River Avenue from the south and Stagecoach Road to Upper Soda Springs Road from the north.

Tauhindauli Park and Trail originated as a project of the Dunsmuir Garden Club. Funding for this project came principally from the Cantara Trustee Council (using funds from the settlement following the Cantara Spill of 1991). There is a Friends of Tauhindauli Park 501(c)(3) organization which is providing restoration and enhancement projects for the Park.
