= Siskiyou Trail =

Historic footpath in California and Oregon

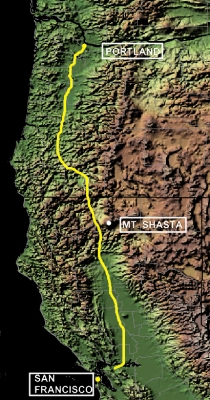
Siskiyou Trail from Portland, Oregon, to San Francisco, California

The Siskiyou Trail stretched from California's Central Valley to the Columbia River in Washington State; modern-day Interstate 5 follows this pioneer path. Originally based on existing Native American foot trails winding their way through river valleys, the Siskiyou Trail provided the shortest practical travel path between early settlements in California and Oregon.

== Development ==
The earliest European or European-American visitors along the Siskiyou Trail were likely hunters and trappers connected with the Hudson's Bay Company (HBC) who, in the 1820s, began to travel the rivers of Southern Oregon and Northern California in search of fur and pelts.

The HBC had established itself on the Columbia River, and built Fort Vancouver, its regional headquarters in 1824. HBC parties began to explore south toward California in 1825. Alexander McLeod led exploration and trapping parties south beginning in 1826, reaching the Klamath River in 1827, and the Sacramento River in 1828. In 1829 he led the first HBC trapping expedition to the Sacramento Valley, which allowed later expeditions to reach as far south as French Camp near today's Stockton.

McLeod's exploring and trapping expeditions essentially established the Siskiyou Trail, linking Fort Vancouver with the Sacramento Valley. At first it was known by names such as the California Brigade Trail and the Southern Party Trail.

McLeod and other members of his parties reported that the Native Americans south of the Umpqua River, along the Klamath and Siuslaw Rivers, had never seen white men before. Although the 42nd parallel (today the boundary between California and Oregon) marked the northern border of Mexican California, the Mexicans knew little about the interior and the HBC trappers ranged south at will.

Other HBC trappers who made early use of the Siskiyou Trail include Peter Skene Ogden and Michel Laframboise.

In 1834, Ewing Young brought a herd of horses and mules over the Siskiyou Trail from missions in California for sale at British and American settlements in Oregon. Although this initial effort was met with suspicion by Hudson's Bay Company officials in Oregon, Young returned to California in 1837, where he purchased 700 head of cattle which he drove over the Siskiyou Trail to Oregon. This monumental task, requiring nearly three months, helped widen and establish the trail thereby solidifying the new American settlements in Oregon.

In 1841, an overland party of the United States Exploring Expedition came down the Siskiyou Trail with the first scientists and cartographers in the region.

The California Gold Rush, beginning in 1848, ushered in dramatically increased use of the Siskiyou Trail. The discovery of gold in Siskiyou County in 1851, and especially at Yreka, California, brought thousands more miners along the trail in search of riches. The terrain was so rugged over the mountains of the trail that travel was restricted to mule trains and horses. Early travelers were able to travel perhaps 20 miles (32 km) in a day, stopping at wayside inns and hostels, such as at Portuguese Flat, Upper Soda Springs and Sisson, in Northern California. It was not until the 1860s that toll roads usable by stagecoaches were finally carved through the mountains of Northern California, permitting uninterrupted stagecoach travel for the length of the Siskiyou Trail.

The first telegraph line connected early towns along the trail in 1864. Development accelerated with the arrival of the Central Pacific Railroad track completed in 1887, which followed the path of the Siskiyou Trail.

== Route ==
The historic route of the Siskiyou Trail extended from the Columbia District headquarters of the Hudson's Bay Company, at Fort Vancouver in southern Washington, to the San Francisco Bay Area. In California, the trail went through or near modern-day Redding, Dunsmuir and Yreka. In Oregon, the route went through or near modern-day Ashland, Grants Pass, Roseburg, Eugene, Salem and Portland.

The trail used the valleys of the Willamette, Umpqua, Rogue, Klamath, Shasta and Sacramento rivers to make the connection between Oregon and California, and to traverse the rugged mountains of Northern California and Southern Oregon (Siskiyou Mountains). The trail crested at the Siskiyou Summit (elevation 4,310 ft (1,310 m)) just north of the Oregon-California border, and went past or near landmarks such as Mount Shasta, Upper Soda Springs, Castle Crags and Sutter Buttes.

== Modern roads ==
Between 1869 and 1887, the Oregon & California Railroad Company built a railroad along this route, crossing Siskiyou Summit in 1887. In the mid-1910s, the pioneering Pacific Highway, later numbered as U.S. Route 99, provided the first easy automobile access along the path of the trail. Interstate 5 was built in the 1960s along the route of the original 1820s Siskiyou Trail. About 4 miles (7 km) north of the California border, and just south of Ashland, Oregon, the highway crosses Siskiyou Summit, the highest point on I-5 (elevation 4,310 ft (1,310 m)). The railroad and interstate highway deviate from the original trail in small ways according to the needs and engineering available to their builders.
