= Trinity Alps =

Mountain range in Siskiyou and Trinity Counties, California

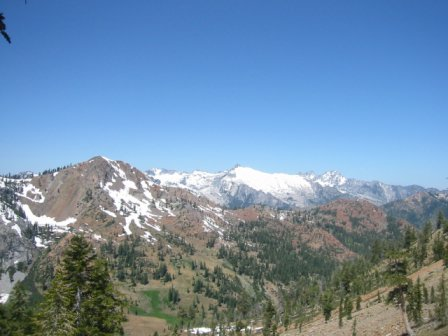
- Trinity Alps near Granite Lake

Highest point
- Peak: Thompson Peak
- Elevation: 9,001 ft (2,744 m)

Geography
- Location within California
- Country: United States
- State: California
- Region: Shasta Cascade
- Counties: Trinity and Siskiyou
- Range coordinates: 41°0′1.505″N 123°2′54.126″W
- Topo map: USGS Thompson Peak

The Trinity Alps are a mountain range in Trinity County and Siskiyou County in Northern California. They are a subrange of the Klamath Mountains located to the north of Weaverville.

== Geography ==
The Trinity Alps are within the Pacific Coast Ranges physiographic region, in the Klamath Mountains System, which lies between the California Coast Ranges to the west and the Cascade Range to the east. Elevations range from 1,350 feet (411 m) to 9,001 feet (2,744 m) on Thompson Peak. Other notable peaks include Granite Peak (8,094 feet (2,467 m)) and Ycatapom Peak (7,593 feet (2,314 m)). The Trinity Alps are noted for their scenic views and alpine environment. The range's alpine flora differs from that found in the Sierra Nevada or the Cascades. Within the Klamath Mountains, adjacent subranges of the Trinity Alps include the Salmon Mountains and Scott Mountains.

The Trinity Alps Wilderness covers 517,000 acres (2,090 km^{2}), making it the second largest wilderness area in California. The area was formerly known as the Salmon-Trinity Alps Primitive Area since 1932 until a series of expansions.

== Glaciers, snowfields, and ice fields ==
The lowest snowfield in California that does not disappear except in the extreme runs of dry years is located above Mirror Lake at an elevation of 6,600 ft (2,000 m).

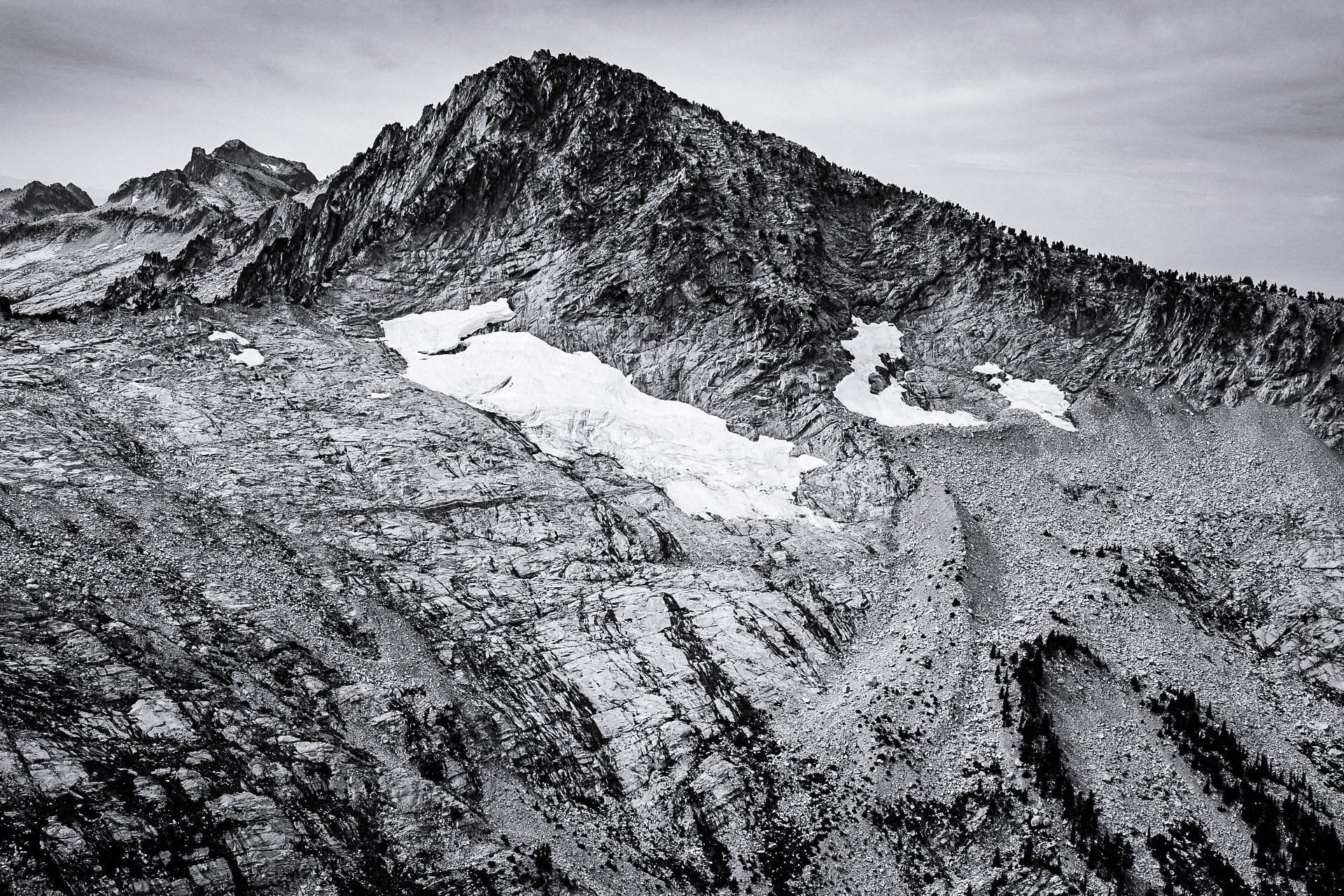
The Grizzly Glacier below the north face of Thompson Peak

Research had shown that some glaciers in the Trinity Alps were more resistant to the effects of global warming than are other California glaciers. According to recent, but incorrect, USGS maps, 35 permanent bodies of snow and several tiny glaciers dotted the highest peaks of the Alps.

The only glaciers to survive to the 21st century were the Salmon Glacier and the Grizzly Glacier, a 15-acre (61,000 m^{2}) icefield on the north side of Thompson Peak, which showed crevasses indicating true motion even on so small an icefield. The Salmon Glacier went extinct in 2015. The Grizzly Glacier was declared extinct in the fall of 2022.

=== Changes after the retreat of the Grizzly Glacier ===
The landscape under the former extent of the Grizzly Glacier now consists of silts, cobbles, and polished granite. A plant community has established itself on the former glacier's moraine. Researchers in a study, which began in 2012, found an establishing plant community of 82 different plant taxa. Researchers documented the Asteraceae family to have the most species. Many of the plants in the retreat zone are subalpine shrubs which can live in small rock outcroppings. Across the plants emerging, after the glacier’s retreat, are 4 distinct ecological communities: a terminal moraine dwarf shrub community, lateral moraine community, foreland meltwater stream community, and a drier foreland community.

=== Glaciers during the Pleistocene ===
During the Pleistocene era the Trinity Alps had glaciers from the valleys to the mountain peaks. Many of these Pleistocene era glaciers have had a significant impacts on modern day geological formations. During the late glaciation period, the Trinity Alps contained over 30 valley glaciers. Researchers have found markings of ancient glaciers in the region which could have spanned for more than 13 miles and reached down to 2450 feet in elevation. The remnants of these glaciers today are expressed in glacial debris throughout the mountains. Prior to the Salmon and Grizzly Glaciers melting out, the Trinity Alps consisted of unique glacial formations given the comparatively low elevations to the nearby Cascades glaciers.

=== Temporary glacier ===
On the ridge south of Sapphire Lake is an unusual phenomenon consisting of a temporary glacier, versus an inactive snowfield that melts out in dry years. Following years of heavy accumulation, an icefield appears in this fully sheltered north-facing cirque that can show active crevasses and seracs some tens of feet high. But this ice body, at an elevation of only 7,500 ft (2,300 m) in a region experiencing a long, hot dry season from about mid May to mid October, can disappear completely during a run of drier years.

== Natural history ==
=== Flora ===
The Trinity Alps section of the Klamath Mountains Ecoregion is botanically outstanding by having the second greatest number of conifer species of any place in the world. Russian Peak, in the Russian Wilderness just north of the Trinity Alps, has the greatest number of conifer species in North America. So many genera and species of conifers exist together because the Trinity Alps are at the intersection of the Mediterranean climate of the south and the Northwestern coastal climate, which has a shorter dry season.

Northern tree species, such as subalpine fir (Abies lasiocarpa), Pacific silver fir (Abies amabilis), and Engelmann spruce (Picea engelmannii) are found here, as well as southern trees, such as incense cedar (Calocedrus decurrens), ponderosa pine (Pinus ponderosa), and white fir (Abies concolor), plus unique populations of foxtail pine (Pinus balfouriana) and weeping spruce (Picea breweriana).

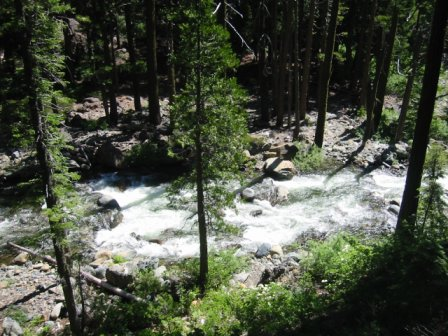
Swift Creek viewed from a footbridge in July 2005

Other plants along the trails include the carnivorous California pitcher plant (Darlingtonia californica), the showy pinkish Lewisia cotyledon, and the rare Trinity Alps endemic wildflower Trinity penstemon (Penstemon tracyi). Sagebrush is found on ridges in the Scott Mountains.

Large fires have burned through some of the forests in the wilderness, including much of the 105,855-acre (428.38 km^{2}) Iron/Alps Complex fire in 2008.

=== Fauna ===
Most of the lakes have been stocked with rainbow, brown or brook trout, and some have self-sustaining populations. The major streams of the North Fork Trinity River and New River watersheds have spawning chinook salmon, and some have steelhead.

The Trinity Alps are home to much wildlife, including: American black bear, mountain lion, bobcat, blacktailed deer, lizards, chipmunks, and a great number of bird species. Deer and black bear are commonly seen. Less common but present are mountain lion, pine marten, fisher, and wolverine. Rough-skinned newts are commonly found in ponds and lakes. The Trinity Alps may be home to a cryptozoological phenomenon, the Trinity Alps Giant Salamander.

=== Geology ===
Deer Lake and reddish ultramafic peridotite rock

Geologically, the Trinity Alps consist of a mixture of igneous, granite and metamorphic peaks. In the eastern mountains are the Red Trinities, due to reddish ultramafic peridotite; in the central granitic batholith are the White Trinities; and in the western mountains are the Green Trinities, due to more extensive forest cover. The region contains much pine and fir forest as well as meadows, creeks, and lakes.

== Recreation ==
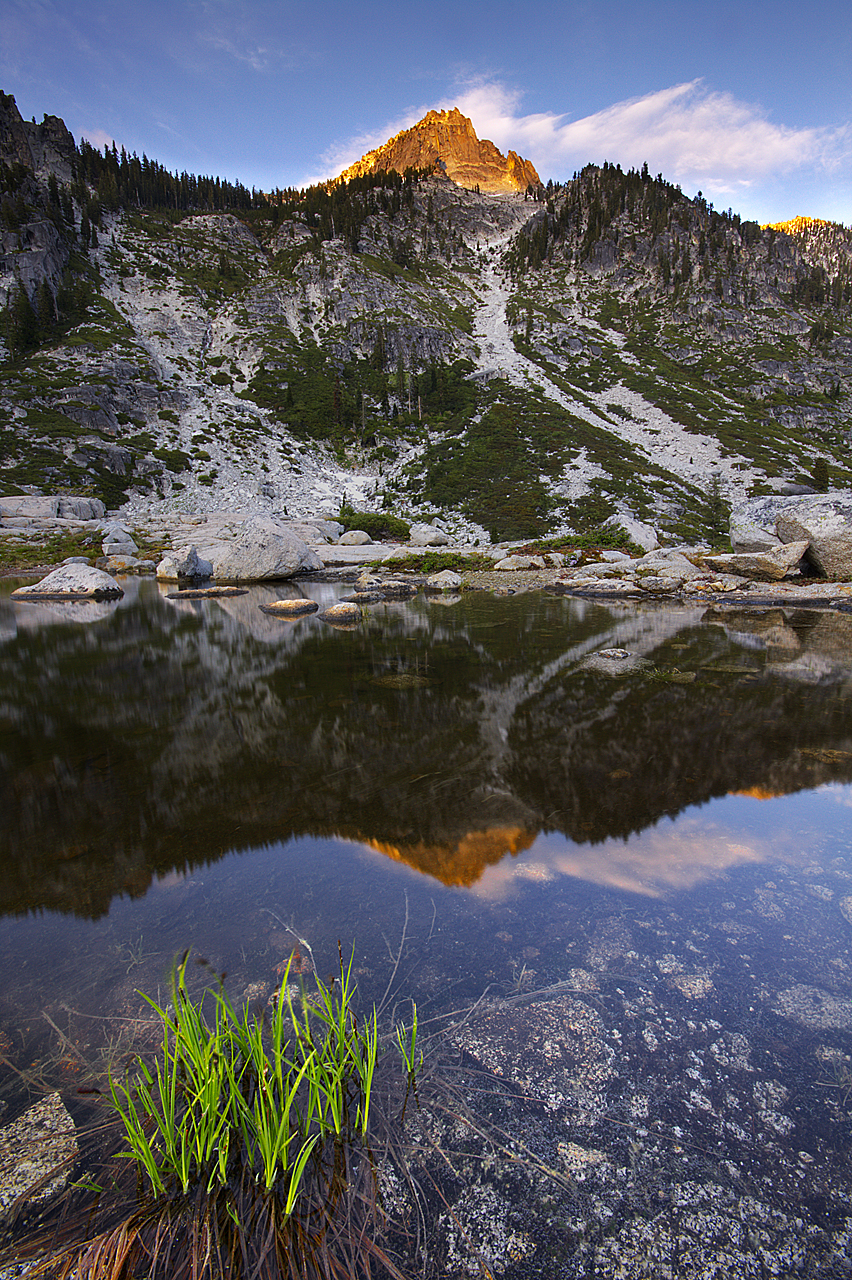
Canyon Creek Lakes

The US Forest Service, Shasta-Trinity National Forest, manages most of the Trinity Alps Wilderness. The northern boundary extends into the Klamath National Forest, and the western boundary extends into the Six Rivers National Forest. There are also private inholdings, especially in the eastern portions. The wilderness contains hiking trails, backcountry camping, and scenery. Access is off California State Route 299 on the south, CA Route 3 on the east, and various old logging and mining roads on the north and west. Wilderness permits are required for hiking. The Pacific Crest Trail connects the northeast corner of the Trinity Alps to the Russian Wilderness and Marble Mountain Wilderness to the north and the Castle Crags Wilderness in the Trinity Divide to the east.

Less-visited areas include New River, Salmon Mountain, Horse Linto Creek, Pony Buttes, and Limestone Ridge in the west, and Packers Peak, Deadman Peak, and Eagle Peak in the Scott Mountains. Most of the area is visited much less heavily than many other wilderness areas in California, such as in the High Sierra of Yosemite National Park and Kings Canyon National Park, but more heavily than the nearby Yolla Bolly-Middle Eel Wilderness.

The most popular destinations beyond the trailheads are Canyon Creek Lakes, Emerald and Sapphire Lakes on the Stuart Fork, and Granite Lake on the Swift Creek trail. The western ridges are mostly lower in elevation with fewer lakes, and ridgetop trails there can be hot and dry in the summer. Trails do not reach all of the lakes; cross-country routes are possible.

The Trinity Alps overlook Trinity Lake to the east, a large reservoir of the federal Central Valley Project on the Trinity River. Hunting occurs for deer, bear, and bandtailed pigeon in season. Rock climbing is excellent in the areas with granite cliffs, such as Caribou Peak and Sawtooth Ridge. During the winter months the Trinity Alps are also a destination for backcountry skiing.

== California Wilderness Act of 1984 ==
Alpine meadow in the Trinity Alps

Motorized vehicles such as snowmobiles and ATVs alongside motorized machinery like chainsaws are not allowed in the Trinity Alps Wilderness because it is part of the California Wilderness Act of 1984. The incorporation of the mountains into the California Wilderness Act of 1984 changed the designation of the mountains as a primitive area to a wilderness part of the National Wilderness Preservation System. This also directed the U.S. Secretary of Agriculture to buy any private lands within the Trinity Alps Wilderness and the broader Shasta-Trinity National Forest .

== See also ==
- Klamath Mountains Ecoregion
- Flora of the Klamath Mountains
