= California State Route 203 =

Highway in California

State Route 203
- SR 203 highlighted in red

Route information
- Maintained by Caltrans
- Length: 8.67 mi (13.95 km)
- Restrictions: Segment from the Mammoth Mountain Ski Area west to Minaret Summit closed in winter

Major junctions
- West end: Minaret Summit
- East end: US 395 near Mammoth Lakes

Location
- Country: United States
- State: California
- Counties: Mono

Highway system
- State highways in California; Interstate; US; State; Scenic; History; Pre‑1964; Unconstructed; Deleted; Freeways
← SR 202	→ SR 204

State Route 203 is a state highway in the U.S. state of California that serves as a spur route from U.S. Route 395 in Mono County to the town of Mammoth Lakes and Minaret Summit. Within Mammoth Lakes, State Route 203 is known as both "Minaret Road" and "Main Street." It connects to Lake Mary Road and the Mammoth Scenic Loop via secondary roads.

== Route description ==
Route 203 is defined in section 503, subsection (a), of the California Streets and Highways Code, and that the highway is "from the Mono County line near Minaret Summit to Route 395". In addition, subdivision (b) permits the state to relinquish control of the portion of Route 203 located within Mammoth Lakes to the town.

SR 203's western terminus is at Minaret Summit, on the border of Mono County and Madera County approximately 7 miles northeast of Devils Postpile National Monument. It then heads east and intersects with Mammoth Scenic Loop Road, before entering the town of Mammoth Lakes, where it is known as both "Minaret Road" and "Main Street". It continues east to its eastern terminus at U.S. Route 395.

West of SR 203's western terminus, the road continues locally as "Postpile Road" or "Minaret Summit Rd" for 8.5 miles passing Devils Postpile National Monument and ending at Red's Meadow Resort and Pack Station. East of US-395, the road continues for 1.7 miles as "Old Hwy" connecting utility yards and rural residences to the route.

Minaret Summit receives significant snowfall during the winter. The highway usually closes between Minaret Summit and the Main Lodge of Mammoth Mountain Ski Area before Thanksgiving and usually does not open much before Memorial Day. There is no actual road closure gate here, as the highway is simply not plowed past the area west of the lodge where ski lifts cross over the road.

== Major intersections ==
Except where prefixed with a letter, postmiles were measured on the road as it was in 1964, based on the alignment that existed at the time, and do not necessarily reflect current mileage. Postmile prefixes include: R reflecting a realignment in the route since then, M indicating a second realignment, L referring to an overlap due to a correction or change, and T indicating postmiles classified as temporary. Segments that remain unconstructed or have been relinquished to local control may be omitted. The entire route is in Mono County.

Location	Postmile	Destinations	Notes
Minaret Summit	L0.00	Minaret Summit Road – Devils Postpile National Monument (closed in winters)	West end of SR 203
	R0.55	Mammoth Mountain Ski Area Main Lodge (SR 203 west closed in winters beyond this point)	
	R3.80	Mammoth Scenic Loop Road to US 395	
Mammoth Lakes	4.78	Lake Mary Road, Minaret Road – Lake Mary	
Mammoth Lakes	5.86	Sierra Park Road, Sawmill Cutoff	Serves Mammoth Hospital
	R8.67	US 395 – Lee Vining, Bishop	Interchange; east end of SR 203; road continues as Substation Road (Old Highway)
1.000 mi = 1.609 km; 1.000 km = 0.621 mi
