= Minaret Summit =

Mountain in the American state of California

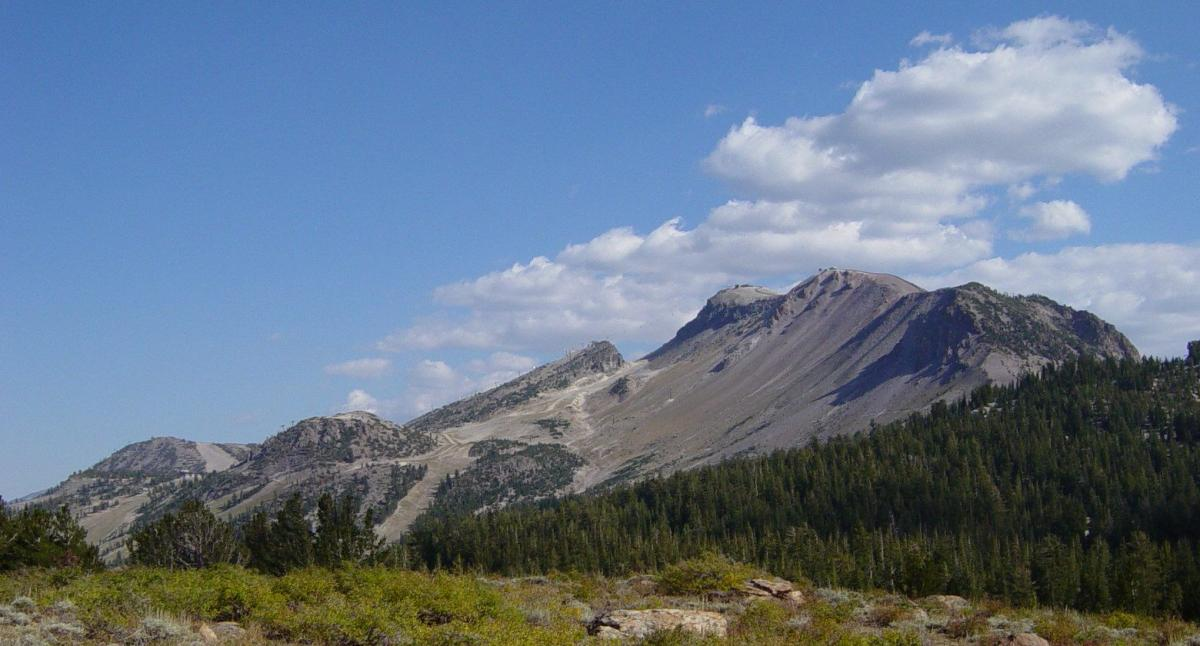
- Mammoth Mountain as viewed from Minaret Summit

- Location within California
- Elevation: 9,265 feet (2,824 m)
- Traversed by: SR 203

Third Approach
- Location: Madera / Mono counties, California, United States
- Range: Sierra Nevada
- Coordinates: 37°39′23″N 119°03′37″W
- Topo map: USGS Mammoth Mountain

Minaret Summit is a mountain pass on Highway 203 in the central Sierra Nevada. The pass, lying on the Madera-Mono County border, is within the Mammoth Ranger District of the Inyo National Forest and located near Devils Postpile National Monument, Mammoth Lakes, and Mammoth Mountain. The elevation of the pass is about 9,265 ft (2,824 m). Highway 203 ends at Minaret Summit. The road continues, now called Reds Meadow Road, until its dead end at the Reds Meadow Pack Station near the Rainbow Falls trailhead.

Plans for a Trans-Sierra Highway connecting the Eastern Sierra and the San Joaquin Valley via Minaret Summit had been discussed since the early days of highway building. The gap between Minaret Road, which runs northeast into the Sierra from North Fork, California, and the end of the Reds Meadow Road is less than 10 miles or 16 kilometres. An area southwest of Minaret Summit was not included in the Wilderness Act of 1964 in order to leave a corridor for this potential highway. While Governor of California, Ronald Reagan made a horse packing trip into the area. Afterwards he supported conservationists' efforts to prevent this highway. Reagan continued his efforts after being elected President in 1980 and the area was eventually designated wilderness by the California Wilderness Act of 1984. The Sierra Nevada escarpment is now a continuous Wilderness from Ball Mountain (near Inyokern) to Tioga Pass, a distance of about 150 miles (240 km).

The Summit offers views of the Ritter Range, including The Minarets, Mount Ritter and Banner Peak, to the west and the Long Valley Caldera, the Glass Mountains and the White Mountains to the east. The Middle Fork of the San Joaquin River runs through the valley between the Summit and the Minarets.

The pass receives significant snowfall during the winter. The road usually closes near the Main Lodge of Mammoth Mountain Ski Area before Thanksgiving and usually doesn't open much before Memorial Day.

In October 2008 items belonging to missing adventurer Steve Fossett were found by Preston Morrow on a hike near Minaret Lake, which is in an area visible from Minaret Summit. This led to the discovery of his remains and aircraft.

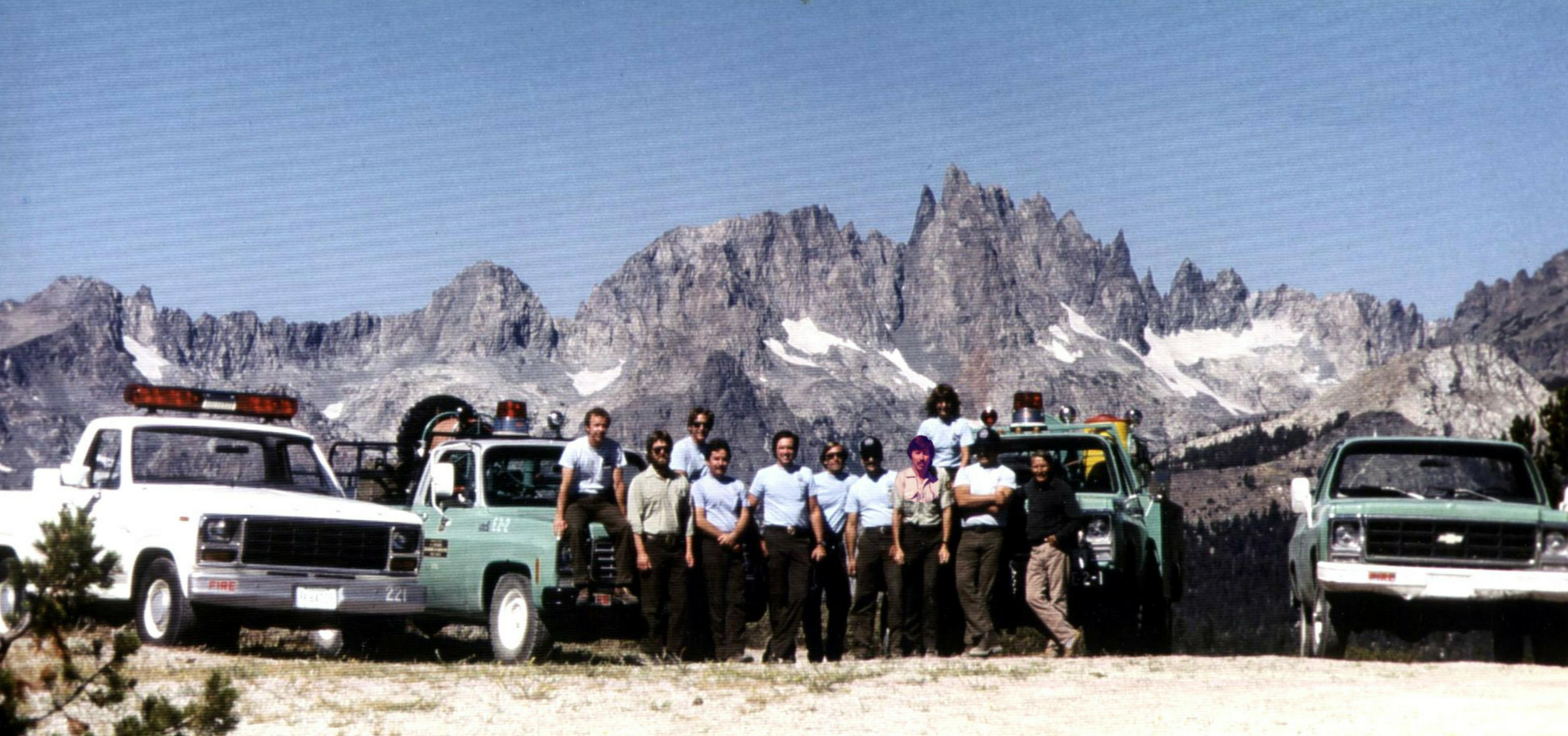
The Minarets behind the Mammoth Ranger District Fire Crew (Inyo National Forest) at Minaret Summit Vista Point circa August 1984. Steve Fossett's remains were found approximately at the spot in the distance behind the leftmost fireman.
