= Genny Smith =

American publisher and editor

- Education: Reed College (B.A.)
- Occupations: Publisher and editor

Genny Smith (1922 - March 4, 2018) was a publisher and editor of guidebooks about the Eastern Sierra Nevada and the Owens Valley of California, United States. Her writings about the history, geology and biology of the region had caused her to be dubbed "the Naturalist Queen of the Eastern Sierra".

Starting in 1958, Smith lobbied against a Trans-Sierra Highway starting at Minaret Summit near Mammoth Lakes, California. Smith and other residents of Mammoth worked with Norman Livermore to convince Governor Ronald Reagan to cancel the road in 1972.

She received a B.A. degree from Reed College in 1943. She was a resident of Cupertino, California, while spending her summers in Mammoth Lakes, California. She was formerly on the board of directors of the Mono Lake Committee.

Smith received the Andrea Lawrence Award from the Mono Lake Committee in 2017, for her guidebook writing and work in preventing the trans-Sierra road.
