= Sapphire Lake =

Sapphire Lake can refer to the following lakes in the United States:

- Sapphire Lake (Fresno County, California), near Mount Fiske
- Sapphire Lake (Trinity County, California)
- Sapphire Lake (Colorado) in El Paso County
- Sapphire Lake (Florida) in Hillsborough County
- Sapphire Lake (Idaho) in Custer County
- A lake in Lake Township, Missaukee County, Michigan
- Sapphire Lake (Minnesota) in Lake County
- Sapphire Lake (Montana), a lake of in Missoula County, Montana
- Sapphire Lake (North Carolina) in Jackson County
- Sapphire Lake (Oregon) in Lane County
- Sapphire Lake (Johnson County, Wyoming)
- Sapphire Lake (Sublette County, Wyoming)

== See also ==
- Lake Sapphire (disambiguation)
