= Granite Peak (Trinity County, California) =

Mountain in California, USA

- Location within California

Highest point
- Elevation: 8,094 ft (2,467 m) NAVD 88
- Prominence: 447 ft (136 m)
- Coordinates: 40°54′37″N 122°52′20″W

Geography
- Location: Trinity County, California, U.S.
- Parent range: Klamath Mountains, Trinity Alps
- Topo map: USGS Covington Mill

Granite Peak is a mountain located in the Trinity Alps of California in the Trinity Alps Wilderness. It rises to the west of Highway 3 and Trinity Lake to an elevation of 8,094 feet (2,467 m). The peak receives copious amounts of snow during the winter.
