= Stuart Fork Trinity River =

Stream in California, United States

Coordinates: 40°49′24″N 122°45′57″W

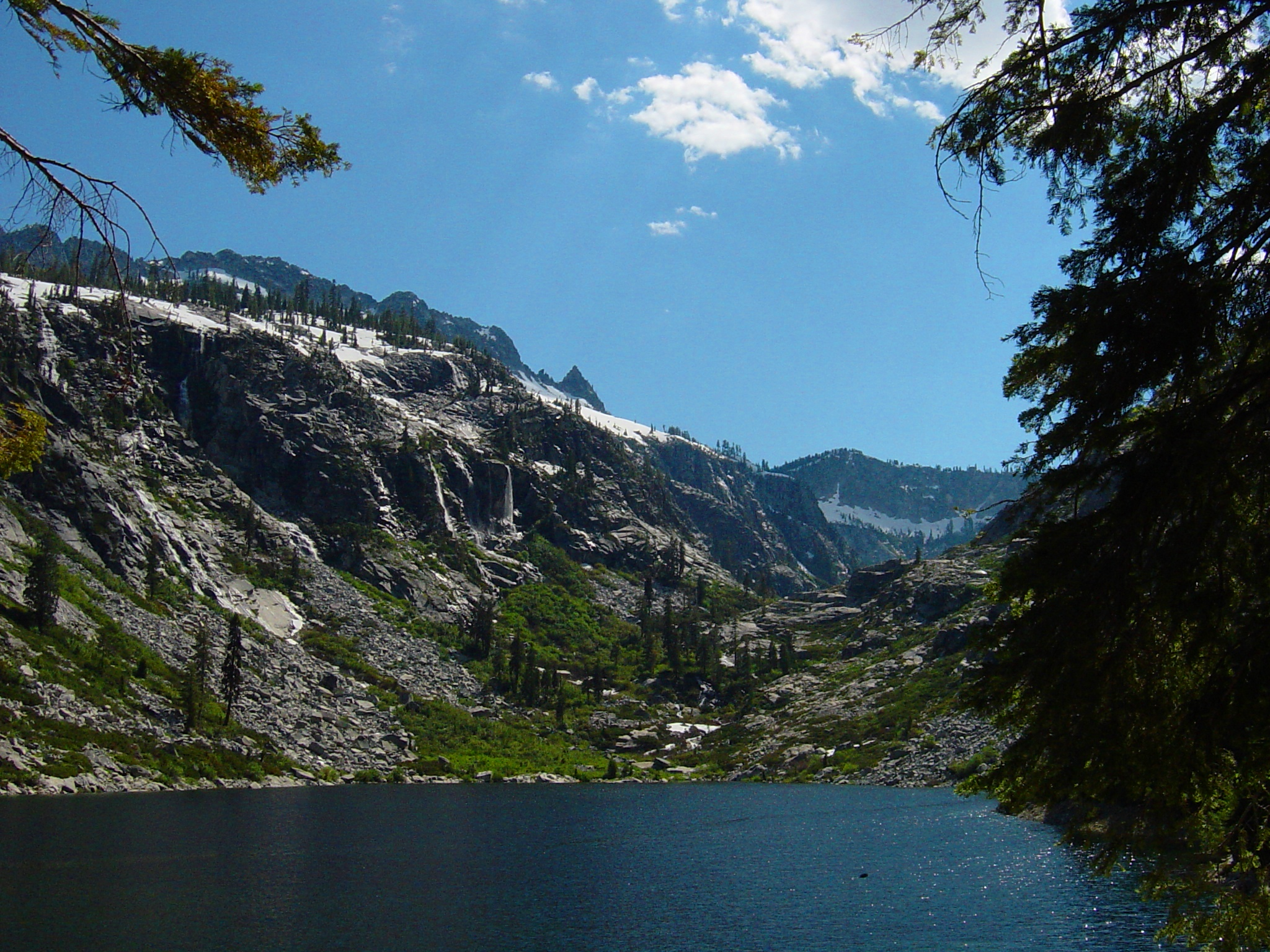
The Stuart Fork begins at Emerald Lake

The Stuart Fork Trinity River (also called Stewart's Fork) is a 14-mile (23 km) tributary of the Trinity River in the U.S. state of California. The Stuart Fork Trinity river rises in the Trinity Alps from its headwaters at Emerald Lake and flows generally southeast into Trinity Lake, a reservoir formed by the Trinity Dam, just north of Buckeye Ridge. Important tributaries include Deer, Hobel and Boulder Creeks; the last 4 miles (6.4 km) of the river is submerged in the lake. Stuart Fork drains an area of roughly 90 square miles (230 km^{2}) and is one of the most important tributaries to the upper Trinity River.

In the 1850s the Stuart Fork of the Trinity River was an important gold mine area, and was dredged by several mining companies. When the Trinity Lake levels are low you can still see large piles of tailings.
