= Minaret Summit Highway =

Proposed highway in California

The Minaret Summit Highway was a proposed highway across the central Sierra Nevada between Madera and Mono counties in California. Proposals for a road through the Mammoth Pass and Minarets area appeared as early as the 1920s and were repeatedly revived during the mid–20th century by Central Valley business and political interests seeking a direct route across the mountains.

The proposal drew opposition from residents and conservation groups concerned about its effects on the San Joaquin River headwaters, Devils Postpile National Monument, and surrounding wilderness. In 1972, Governor Ronald Reagan announced that the Nixon administration would not support construction of the highway. The remaining corridor was later included in wilderness protections under the California Wilderness Act of 1984, preventing construction of the proposed route.

== History ==
=== Initial proposals ===
Proposals for highways across the central Sierra Nevada appeared during the 1920s, but none were built. The National Park Service has described their failure as reflecting the growing strength of conservation interests.

The relatively low elevation of Mammoth Pass continued to attract interest from Central Valley business interests. When the High Sierra and Minarets primitive areas were designated west of the Middle Fork San Joaquin River valley in 1931, a five–mile gap was left between them to allow for the possible construction of a highway.

=== Lobbying and opposition ===
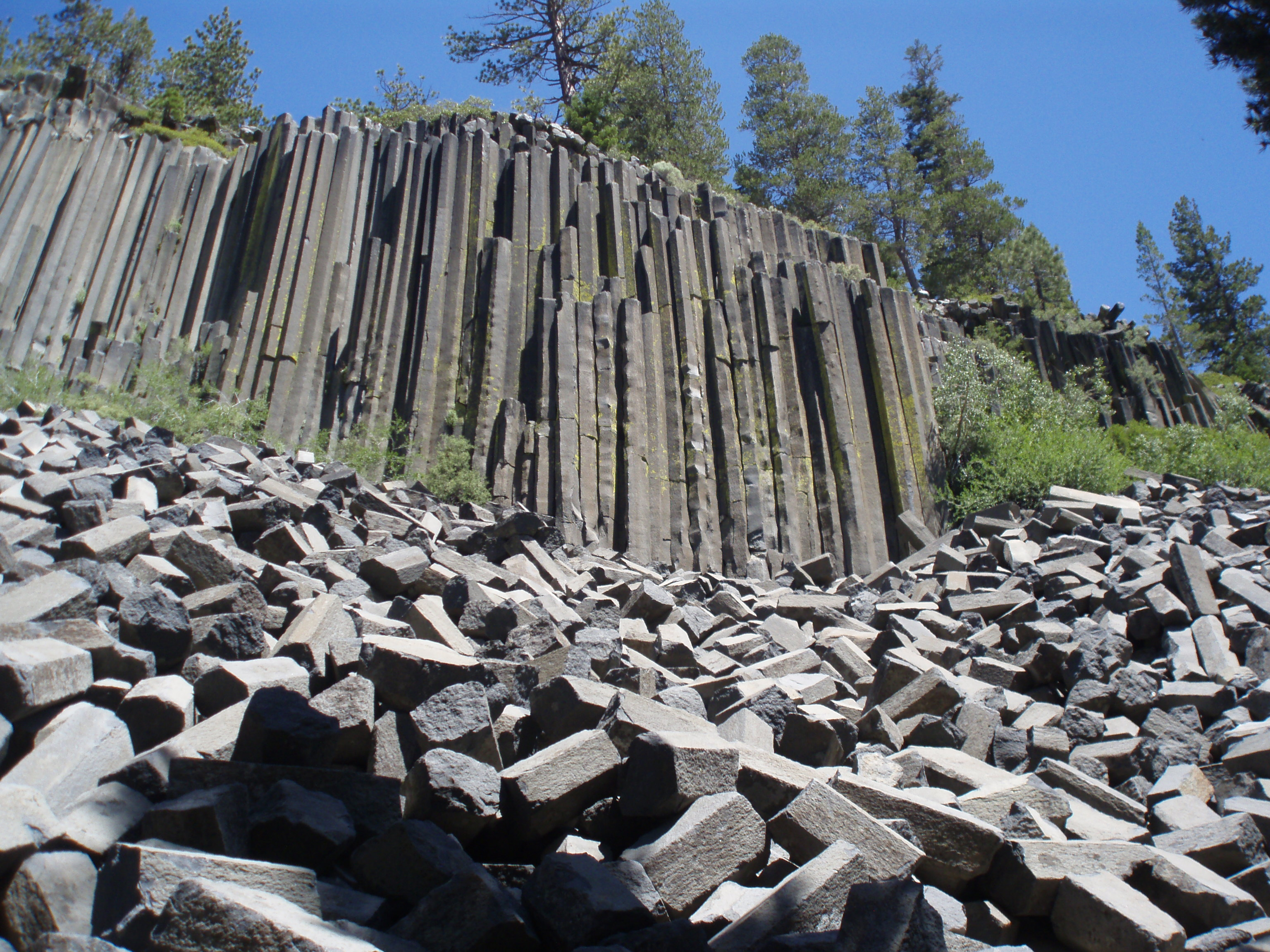
Devils Postpile National Monument, one of the areas cited in opposition to the proposed highway.

The proposal resurfaced in the mid–1950s, when representatives from Fresno, Madera, and Merced counties began lobbying for a highway across the Sierra. Supporters promoted the route as a way to reach the "rich markets to the east," while others argued for it on national-defense grounds.

A 1957 study by the Bureau of Public Roads and the U.S. Forest Service concluded that a highway was feasible. Opposition subsequently grew in the Mammoth area, where residents gathered hundreds of signatures against the proposal, laying the groundwork for a local movement led in part by Genny Smith.

In 1966, California state highway engineer J. C. Womack concluded that although the highway was technically feasible, construction would be difficult and expensive. His report cited the need for large bridges across steep canyons, unusually high snow–removal costs, and the possibility that blasting near Devils Postpile National Monument could damage the monument's basalt columns. Womack recommended that neither state nor federal funds be allocated to the project, although some state legislators continued to support it.

=== Environmental review and rejection ===
An environmental impact statement issued in 1971 concluded that the proposed highway would have "substantial adverse impacts," citing effects on scenery, soils, vegetation, fish, wildlife, and recreation areas. California subsequently objected to the proposal, arguing that its environmental effects had not been adequately addressed.

In 1972, Governor Ronald Reagan announced during a pack trip in the Sierra Nevada that President Richard Nixon opposed the highway and supported closing the remaining gap between the surrounding protected areas. At Summit Meadow, Reagan declared that "the proposed Trans-Sierra Highway will not be built."
