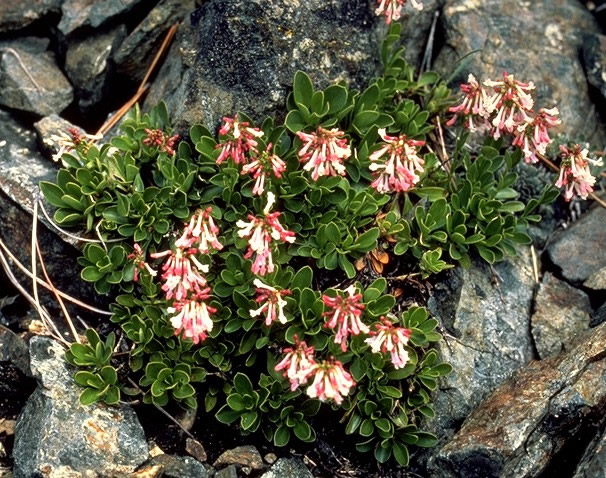

Conservation status
- Imperiled (NatureServe)

Scientific classification
- Kingdom: Plantae
- Clade: Tracheophytes
- Clade: Angiosperms
- Clade: Eudicots
- Clade: Asterids
- Order: Lamiales
- Family: Plantaginaceae
- Genus: Penstemon
- Species: P. tracyi

Binomial name
- Penstemon tracyi D.D.Keck

= Penstemon tracyi =

Species of flowering plant

Penstemon tracyi is a rare species of penstemon known by the common names Trinity penstemon and Tracy's beardtongue.

The plant is endemic to Trinity County, California, where it is known from fewer than 10 occurrences in the Trinity Alps, of the Klamath Mountains. It grows in exposed rocky outcrops and barren talus in the high mountains.

== Description ==
Penstemon tracyi is a squat perennial herb growing no more than 12 centimeters tall. The hairless oval to rounded leaves are 1 to 2 centimeters long.

The inflorescence bears dense clusters of tubular pink flowers each about a centimeter long. The mouth of the flower has hairs along the floor and a tuft of hairs at the tip of the staminode.
