= Mammoth Brewing Company =

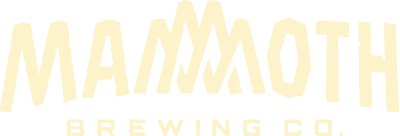
- Industry: Brewing
- Founded: 1995
- Founder: Sam Walker
- Headquarters: Mammoth Lakes, California, United States
- Area served: California & Nevada
- Products: Beer
- Owner: Sean Turner
- Number of employees: 40+
- Parent: Mammoth Brewing Group
- Website: www.mammothbrewingco.com

Mammoth Brewing Company is a Californian regional brewery founded in 1995 in Mammoth Lakes.

== History ==
Mammoth Brewing Company was founded in 1995, and is one of the highest elevation breweries on the West Coast of the United States at over 8,000 feet above sea level. Since 2007 it is owned by Sean Turner. The brewery and tasting room are located at 18 Lake Mary Road, in Mammoth Lakes. They also had a tasting house, office and gift shop at 94 Berner Street, Mammoth, although this was relocated in 2013. In early 2013 they produced 5,300 barrels per year; in May 2013 they added two fermenters and one bright beer tank to increase their capacity to 8,000 barrels a year.

== Beers ==
Mammoth's beers include:

- Golden Trout Kolsch (5.5% abv) - a kolsch style beer
- Yosemite Pale Ale (5.5% abv) - an American pale ale.
- Double Nut Brown (5.5% abv) - a porter. Won a gold award at the 2012 World Beer Cup in the Brown Porter category, and a gold medal at the 2014 Great American Beer Festival in the Brown Porter category.
- Real McCoy Amber (5.5% abv) - an Amber Ale. Won a bronze award at the 2012 World Beer Cup in the German Style Brown/Düsseldorf-Style Altbier category.
- Epic IPA (6.5% abv) - an India pale ale.
- IPA 395 (8.0% abv) - a double IPA or a spiced ale.

=== Seasonals ===
Mammoth Brewing Company has a variety of seasonal beers including:

- "Elderberry Sour" (8.0% abv)- A Belgian style sour beer.
- "El Capitan" (9.5% abv)- a west coast style imperial IPA.
- Floating Rock Hefeweizen (5.0% abv) - a wheat beer named after pumice.
- Wild Sierra Mountain Farmhouse Ale (7.5% abv)
- Blondibock (7.5% abv) - A bourbon barrel aged German style bock, formerly known as Bluesapalooza Blonde Bock.
- Lair of the Bear (9.5% abv)
- Fire & Eisbock (10.0% abv)
- Hair of the Bear Doppelbock (9.0% abv)
