= Gilbert Hill =

Monolith column of black basalt rock at Andheri, in Mumbai, India

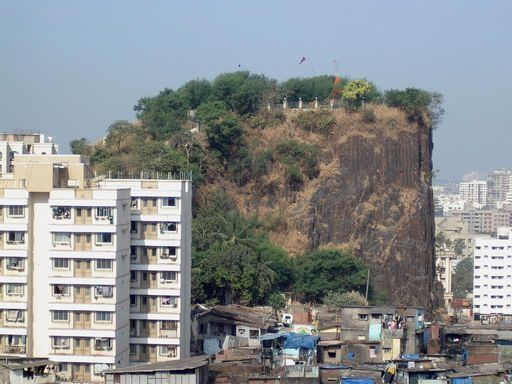
- Gilbert Hill

Highest point
- Elevation: 60 m (200 ft)
- Coordinates: 19°07′15″N 72°50′24.24″E

Geography
- Location within Mumbai
- Location: Andheri, Mumbai, India

Geology
- Rock age: 66 myr
- Mountain type: Volcanic
- Volcanic zone: Deccan Traps

Climbing
- Easiest route: East (steps)

Gilbert Hill is a 200 ft (61 m) monolith column of black basalt rock at Andheri, in Mumbai, India. The rock has a sheer vertical face and was formed when molten lava was squeezed out of the Earth's clefts during the Mesozoic Era about 66 million years ago. During that era, molten lava had spread around most of the Indian states of Maharashtra, Gujarat and Madhya Pradesh, covering an area of 50,000 square kilometres (19,000 sq mi). The volcanic eruptions were also responsible for the destruction of plant and animal life during that era. According to experts, this rare geological phenomenon was the remnant of a ridge and had clusters of vertical columns in nearby Jogeshwari which were quarried off two decades ago. These vertical columns are similar to the Devils Tower National Monument in Wyoming, and the Devils Postpile National Monument in eastern California, USA. Gilbert Hill was declared a National Park in 1952 by the Central Government under the Forest Act. In 2007, after years of lobbying by geologists, the hill was declared a Grade II heritage structure by the Municipal Corporation of Greater Mumbai (MCGM), and all quarrying and other activities around the monument were prohibited. Over the period of time, Gilbert Hill has faced severe erosion problems too.

Atop the rock column, two Hindu temples, the Gaodevi and Durgamata temples, set in a small garden, are accessed by a steep staircase carved into the rock. The hill offers a panoramic view of suburban Mumbai.

== Gallery ==
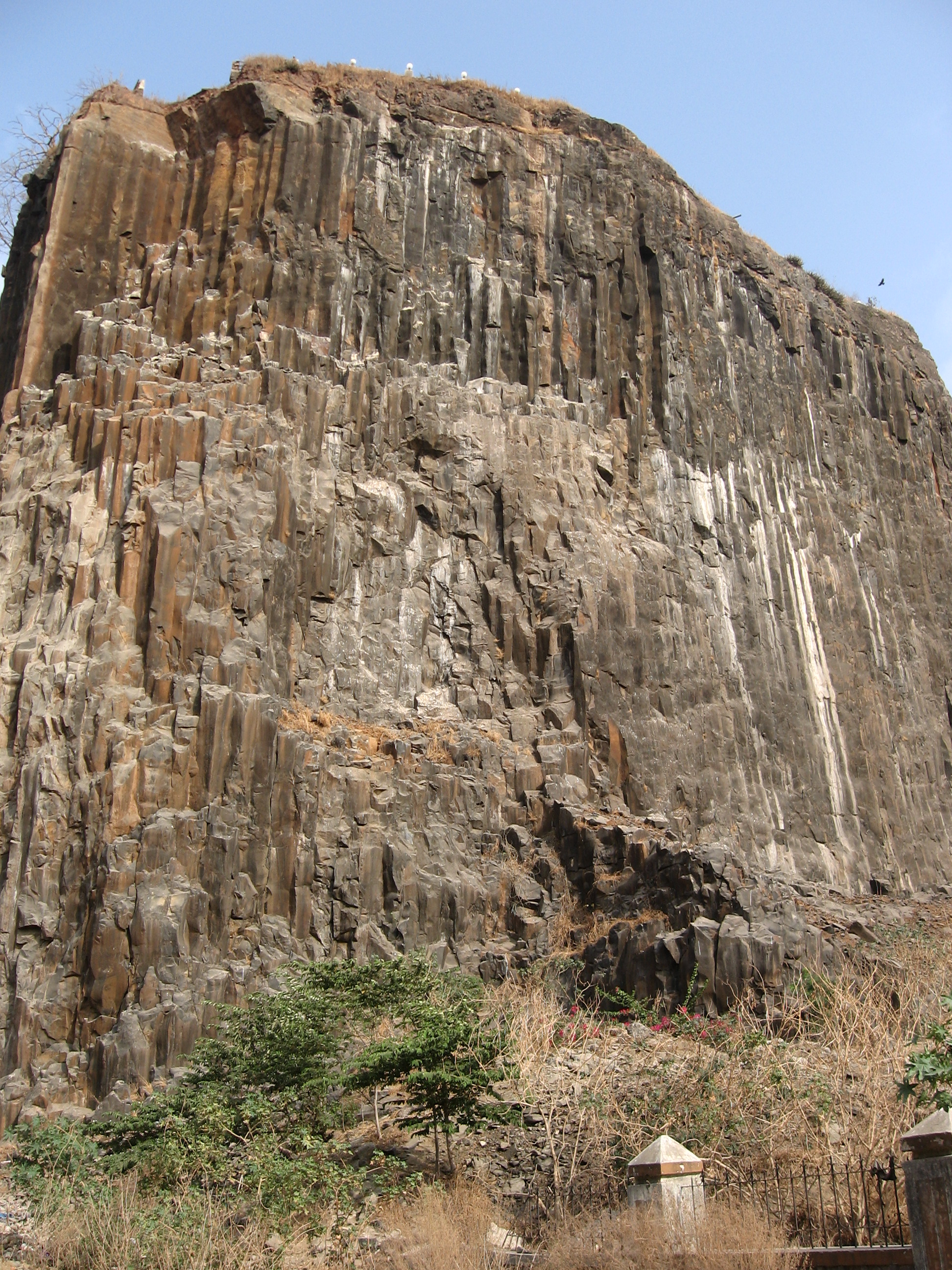

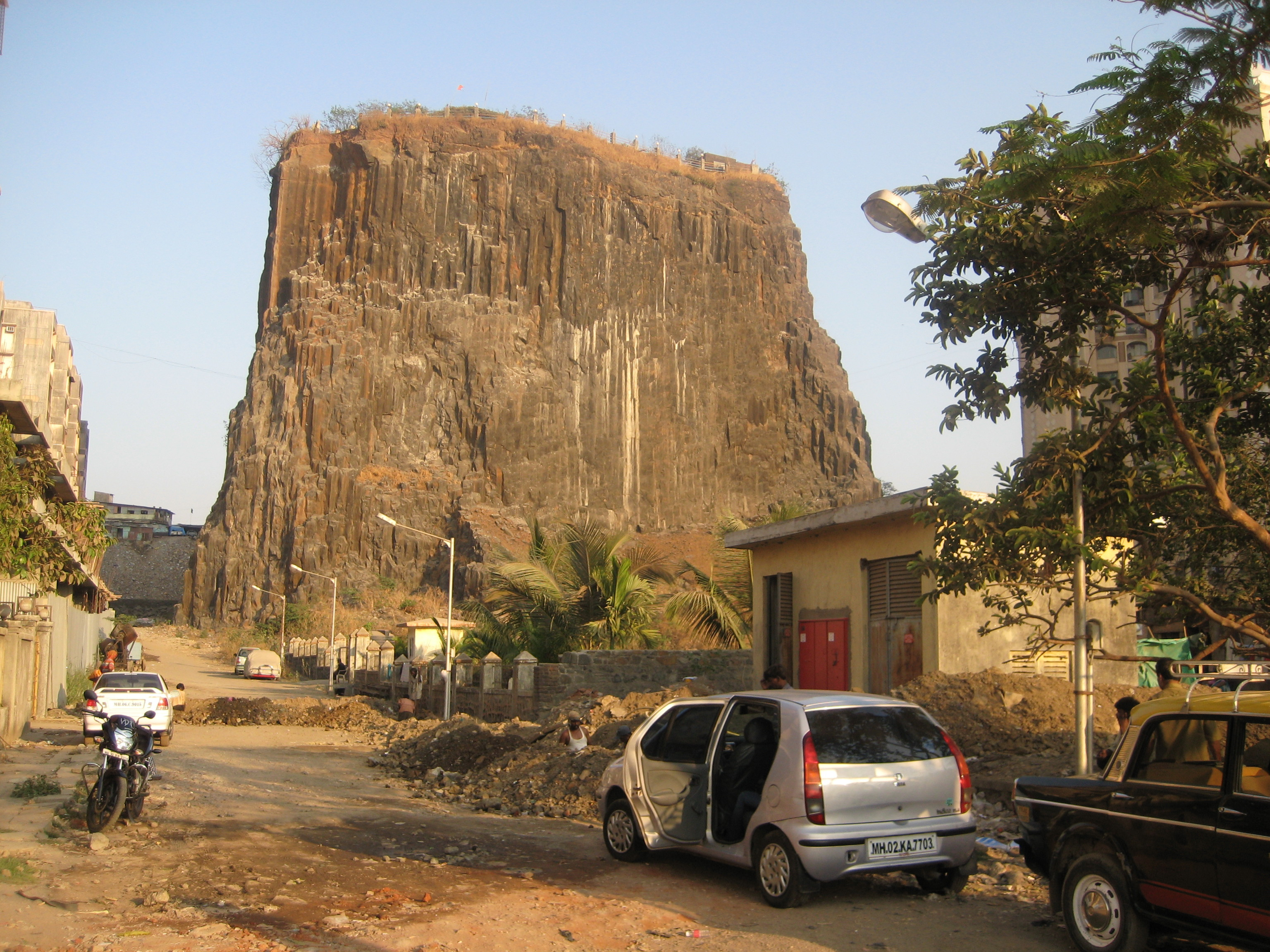
Gilbert Hill, a monolith column of black basalt

== See also ==
- Devils Postpile National Monument
- Deccan Trap
