= George Whitmore (climber) =

American mountain climber and conservationist (1931–2021)

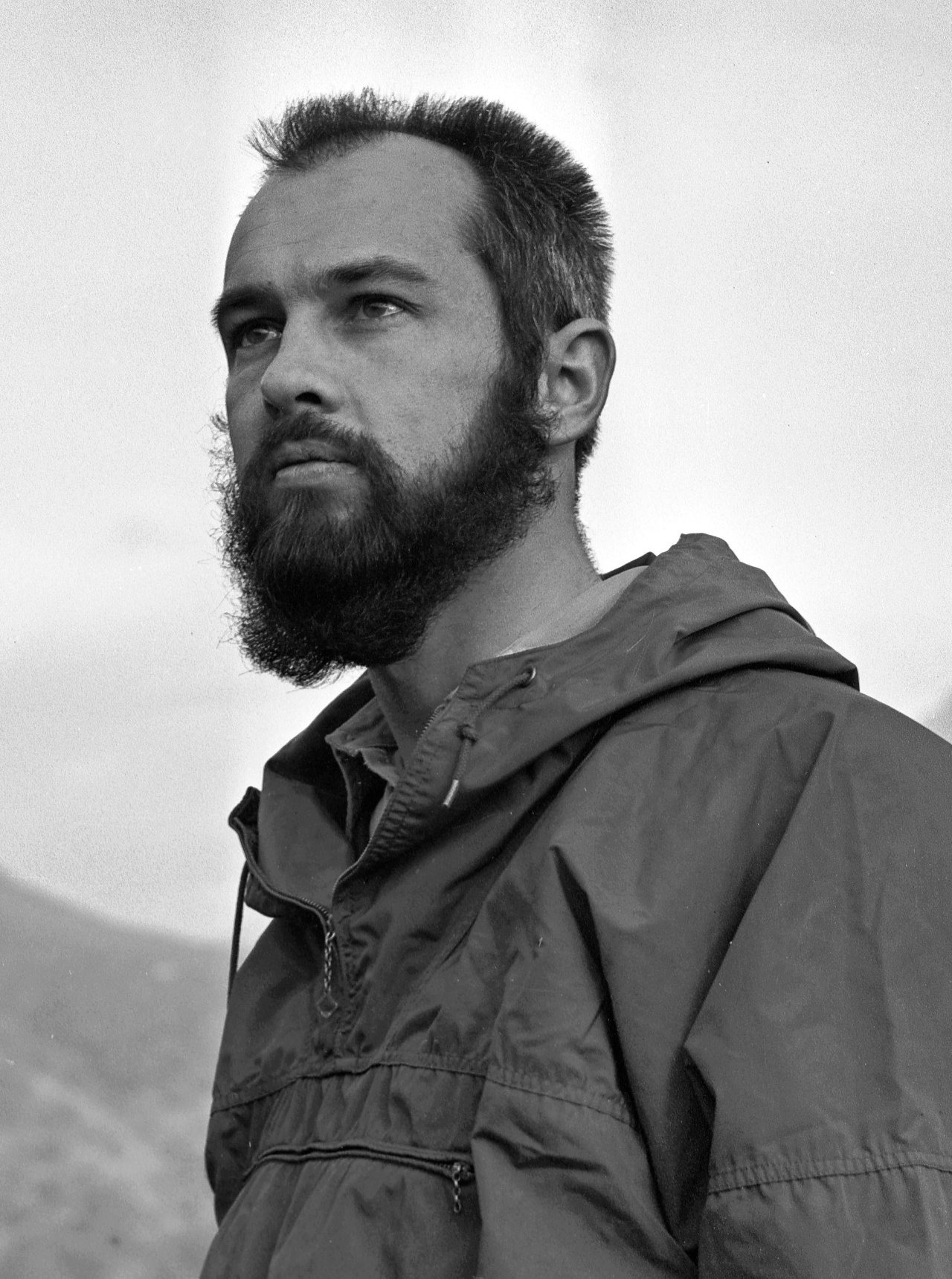

George William Whitmore (February 8, 1931 – January 1, 2021) was an American mountain climber and conservationist. He was a member of the first team to climb a vertical face El Capitan in 1958, by the route called The Nose.

== Background ==
Whitmore was trained as a pharmacist at the University of California, San Francisco.

He served in the Air Force as an aeromedical evacuation officer and later worked as a pharmacist. Whitmore was a lifelong environmental activist on behalf of wilderness preservation, such as promoting the establishment of the Kaiser Wilderness in 1976. He lobbied for passage of the California Wilderness Act of 1984, which he later described as establishing "the longest stretch of de facto wilderness in the lower 48 states."

Whitmore previously beat cancer. He died from complications subsequent to COVID-19 in Fresno, California, on January 1, 2021, at the age of 89.
