= Ycatapom Peak =

Mountain in California, United States

Highest point
- Elevation: 7,593 ft (2,314 m) NAVD 88
- Coordinates: 41°01′43″N 122°47′44″W

Geography
- Parent range: Trinity Alps
- Topo map: USGS Ycatapom Peak

Ycatapom Peak (/waɪˈkɑːtəpɒm/ or /waɪˈkætəpɒm/) is a mountain in the Trinity Alps in California, United States.

The name "Ycatapom" comes from the Wintu wayk'odipom, meaning "north step place".
