= Little Devils Postpile =

Rock formation in California

Coordinates: 37°54′02″N 119°24′45″W

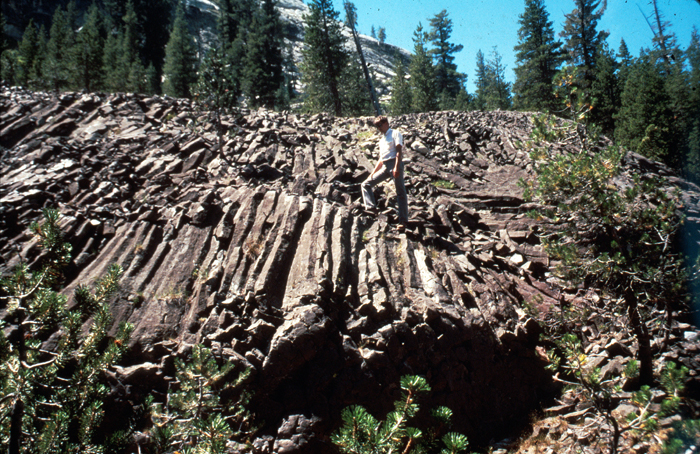
Little Devils Postpile

Little Devils Postpile is a columnar basalt rock formation in the Sierra Nevada, located within Yosemite National Park and eastern Tuolumne County, California.

The formation is a set of columnar joints in a basalt plug resembling the larger formation in Devils Postpile National Monument, to the south in the Sierra Nevada. It is located along the Tuolumne River, several miles west of Tuolumne Meadows.

== See also ==
- List of places with columnar jointed volcanics
- Rock formations of California
