= Devils Postpile National Monument Ranger Cabin =

- U.S. National Register of Historic Places
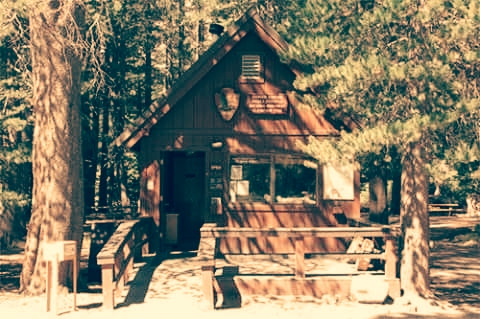
- Devils Postpile National Monument Ranger Cabin

- Location within California Location within the United States
- Location: Minaret Summit Rd., Devils Postpile National Monument
- Coordinates: 37°37′49″N 119°05′05″W
- Area: less than one acre
- Built: 1941
- Built by: Shilko, Hiram S.
- NRHP reference No.: 15000859
- Added to NRHP: December 8, 2015

The Devils Postpile National Monument Ranger Cabin, in Devils Postpile National Monument, is located on Minaret Summit Road, about 8 miles (13 km) from the summit. It was listed on the National Register of Historic Places in 2015.

According to its NRHP nomination

As the oldest standing building in Devils Postpile National Monument, the ranger cabin provides a unique connection to the early period of NPS planning and development at the monument. It typifies the emphasis on efficiency, creative reuse of materials, and functional construction that became a feature of national park planning and development during the late 1930s and early 1940s. The cabin also embodies the utilitarian approach to planning that formed at Devils Postpile during its early years as a subsidiary of Yosemite National Park. Initially a response to severe budget and staffing constraints, the focus on maintaining quality visitor contacts with minimal facilities became a hallmark of Devils Postpile’s administrative evolution. The ranger cabin symbolizes the continuation of this management philosophy to the present and contributes significantly to the monument’s historic character.
