= California Wilderness Act of 1984 =

Congress of the United States
- Long title: California Wilderness Act of 1984
- Enacted by: Congress of the United States
- Enacted: September 12, 1984
- Signed: September 28, 1984
- Introduced by: Phillip Burton (D-CA-5th-San Francisco)

The California Wilderness Act of 1984 is a federal law (Public Law 98-425), passed by the United States Congress on September 28, 1984, that authorized the addition of over 3 million acres (12,000 km^{2}) within the state of California to the National Wilderness Preservation System. Conservation activist George Whitmore later credited the Act with establishing "the longest stretch of de facto wilderness in the lower 48 states." The California Wilderness Act was one of a number of federal Wildnerness Acts signed in 1984 which established and expanded wilderness areas in different states, including the Washington, Oregon and Vermont Wilderness Acts.

== Background-Roadless Areas ==
The federal Wilderness Act passed in 1964 provided guidelines and provisions for future wilderness additions, of which this California Act is one. One key provision called for evaluating roadless areas for future wilderness classification. The US Forest Service began its evaluation in 1967 and was known as the Roadless Area Review and Evaluation or "RARE." Each area had to be at least 5,000 acres (20 km^{2}), have only foot trails, and be undeveloped. The first evaluation and inventory was completed in April 1972 and after public input, a final list of 16 roadless areas came out in 1973. This list had three-quarters of a million acres (4,000 km²) of public land spread across 12 national forests.
A second evaluation (RARE II) was done in 1977 that was more extensive and had more time for public input. It was completed and published in 1978. RARE II guidelines were a bit more relaxed than its predecessor. It allowed slight traces of human impact, such as limited fencing, old fire towers and unimproved roads, as long as these traces did not disturb the "wilderness" ambiance. This second inventory had 69 roadless areas totaling almost 900,000 acres (3,600 km^{2}), 176 non-wilderness areas of about 2,500,000 acres (10,000 km^{2}) and 118 further planning areas. Then things got a bit complicated. The state of California sued the US Forest Service charging that the agency's Environmental Impact Statement (EIS) process was faulty as it only had public comments from northern California and had ignored the remaining 97.5 per cent of the state's population.
In a letter, Regional Forester Smith commented,

...On balance, I think RARE II was a success...for the first time somebody thought about what the wilderness system ought to look like when it was complete. For the first time somebody took the time to estimate the criteria and characteristics of a complete National Wilderness Preservation System. RARE II ...brought the question of land use, particularly wilderness, to the attention of more people in this country than any other effort.

— Source: letter from Zane G. Smith, Jr to Dr. Richard P. Gayle
Feb.4, 1982 Box 3, 95-91-0003 National Archive Record Center San Bruno, CA

The old 1978 inventory was updated and revised in 1983 but was still too controversial in many states. It finally came down to a state-by-state basis instead of a nationwide recommendation.

The California Wilderness Act included the inventoried roadless areas from RARE II as well as other areas recommended by environmentalists.

== Special provisions ==
The California Wilderness Act of 1984 contains several special provisions allowing certain uses and activities within the wilderness areas that are otherwise prohibited. These exemptions are:

1. Motorized access- §101(a)(2) and (25) allow continued access for livestock facilities in two specific areas which are the Wolf Creek drainage area in the Toiyabe National Forest (Carson-Iceberg Wilderness) and the Heitz Meadow Guard Station area (San Joaquin /Ansel Adams wilderness areas)
§101(a)(6) allows motorized administrative use of the Buckhorn Fire Road between the contiguous areas of Dick Smith Wilderness and the San Rafael Wilderness.
§101(a)(24) allows a right-of-way corridor for construction, within 10 years, of a transmission powerline. If the powerline is constructed, the corridor will no longer be within the wilderness boundary of the San Jacinto Wilderness.

2. Water Infrastructure- §101(a)(25) protects rights for water diversion and use, including construction, operation, maintenance, and repair in the hydroelectric project on the North Fork San Joaquin River.

== Minaret Area Considerations ==
When the Wilderness Act of 1964 was being drafted California politicians were concerned about maintaining the viability of plans for a Trans-Sierra Highway connecting the Eastern Sierra and the San Joaquin Valley. These plans centered on the Minaret Summit area as the distance between the end of Minaret Road, which runs northeast into the Sierras from North Fork, California, and the end of the Red's Meadow Road, running west from Mammoth Lakes, California is less than 10 miles. The Act excluded an area southwest of Minaret Summit to create a corridor for this possibility.

During his time as Governor of California, Ronald Reagan made a horse packing trip into the area. Afterwards he supported conservationists' efforts to prevent this highway. Reagan continued his efforts after being elected President in 1980 and his influence helped the area to eventually be designated as wilderness by this legislation. The Sierra Nevada escarpment is now a continuous wilderness from Round Mountain (near Inyokern) to Tioga Pass, a distance of about 150 miles.

== The "G-O Road" ==
The passage of the California Wilderness Act created the 153,000-acre (620 km^{2}) Siskiyou Wilderness within the Six Rivers, Klamath and Siskiyou national forests. Within this wilderness area is a portion of the forest road connecting the towns of Gasquet and Orleans (hence the term "G-O Road") which traverses land traditionally used by Native Americans for religious practices. The Forest Service planned to pave a section of the road and conduct a timber sale in the early 1970s . A lawsuit filed by Native Americans to stop this road's upgrade and associated timber harvest went all the way to the US Supreme Court.

The US Forest Service planned to upgrade and pave a 6-mile (9.7 km) segment of the road that goes through an area called Chimney Rock. In addition, a timber harvest was also scheduled for this area. In 1975, the Forest Service released a draft environmental impact statement (DEIS) as required by the National Environmental Policy Act, or NEPA. In response to public comments received on the environmental statement, including consideration of other routes and appeals by the Sierra Club and a group of Native Americans, the Secretary of Agriculture, Richard E. Lyng, supported the Chief Forester and Regional Forester's decision favoring the Chimney Rock Corridor.
In 1977 the Forest Service issued a second DEIS for construction of the G-O Road. After public discussion on this second DEIS, the Forest Service hired an external, professional anthropological consulting firm called Theodoratus Cultural Research, to estimate the effect of building the G-O Road and harvesting timber in the Chimney Rock Section of the Six Rivers National Forest.

Theodoratus Cultural Research, Inc. reported that a cultural conflict existed between Indian religious activity and Forest Service management practices. They concluded that "intrusions on the sanctity of the...high country are . . . potentially destructive of the very core of Northwest [Indian] religious beliefs and practices." They recommended against completing the G-O Road. In 1982, the Forest Service decided not to adopt this recommendation, and it prepared a final environmental impact statement for construction of the road.

Several groups, including a Native American organization and individuals, nature organizations, and the State of California—challenged both the roadbuilding and timber harvesting decisions in the United States District Court for the Northern District of California. Respondents claimed that the Forest Service's decisions violated the Free Exercise of Religion Clause in the First Amendment, the Federal Water Pollution Control Act (FWPCA), the National Environmental Policy Act of 1969 (NEPA), and several other federal statutes.

After trial, the District Court issued a permanent injunction prohibiting the Forest Service from constructing the Chimney Rock section of the G-O road or putting the timber harvesting management plan into effect. (Northwest Indian Cemetery Protective Assn. v. Peterson, 565 F.Supp. 586 (1983)). The court found that both actions would violate the Free Exercise Clause because they "would seriously damage the salient visual, aural, and environmental qualities of the high country." The court also found that both proposed actions would violate the FWPCA, and that the environmental impact statements for construction of the road were deficient under the NEPA. Finally, the court concluded that both projects would breach the Government's trust responsibilities to protect water and fishing rights reserved for Native Americans of Hoopa Valley. The Forest Service appealed the decision.

While an appeal was pending before the US Court of Appeals for the Ninth Circuit, the California Wilderness Act of 1984 was passed, which means that timber harvesting and road construction are forbidden. The Ninth Circuit Court upheld the lower court's decision.

In 1987 The US Supreme court heard arguments in the case, and overturned the lower court's rulings by a 5–3 decision. Justice O'Connor wrote the majority opinion which basically stated that the First Amendment rights of the Native Americans have not been violated because the actions of the Forest Service do not prohibit the practice of religion.
As stated in the Opinion:

This does not and cannot imply that incidental effects of government programs, which may make it more difficult to practice certain religions but which have no tendency to coerce individuals into acting contrary to their religious beliefs, require government to bring forward a compelling justification for its otherwise lawful actions. The crucial word in the constitutional text is "prohibit"...

Justice Brennan wrote the dissenting opinion, stating,

I thus cannot accept the Court's premise that the form of the government's restraint on religious practice, rather than its effect, controls our constitutional analysis. Respondents here have demonstrated that construction of the G-O road will completely frustrate the practice of their religion, for, as the lower courts found, the proposed logging and construction activities will virtually destroy respondents' religion, and will therefore necessarily force them into abandoning those practices altogether.

In 1992 the Smith River National Recreation Area was established and the area in which the G-O Road was established was incorporated into the Siskiyou Wilderness ending years of uncertainty over whether the road would be built.
