= Horse Linto Creek =

Stream in California, United States

Coordinates: 41°00′01″N 123°37′13″W

Horse Linto Creek is a stream in Humboldt County, California, in the United States. It flows into the Trinity River about 4 miles (6.4 km) north of the town of Willow Creek.

Horse Linto was the phonetic pronunciation of the Native American settlement formerly at the creek.

== See also ==
- List of rivers of California
