= Rainbow Falls (California) =

Waterfalls in Madera County, California, United States

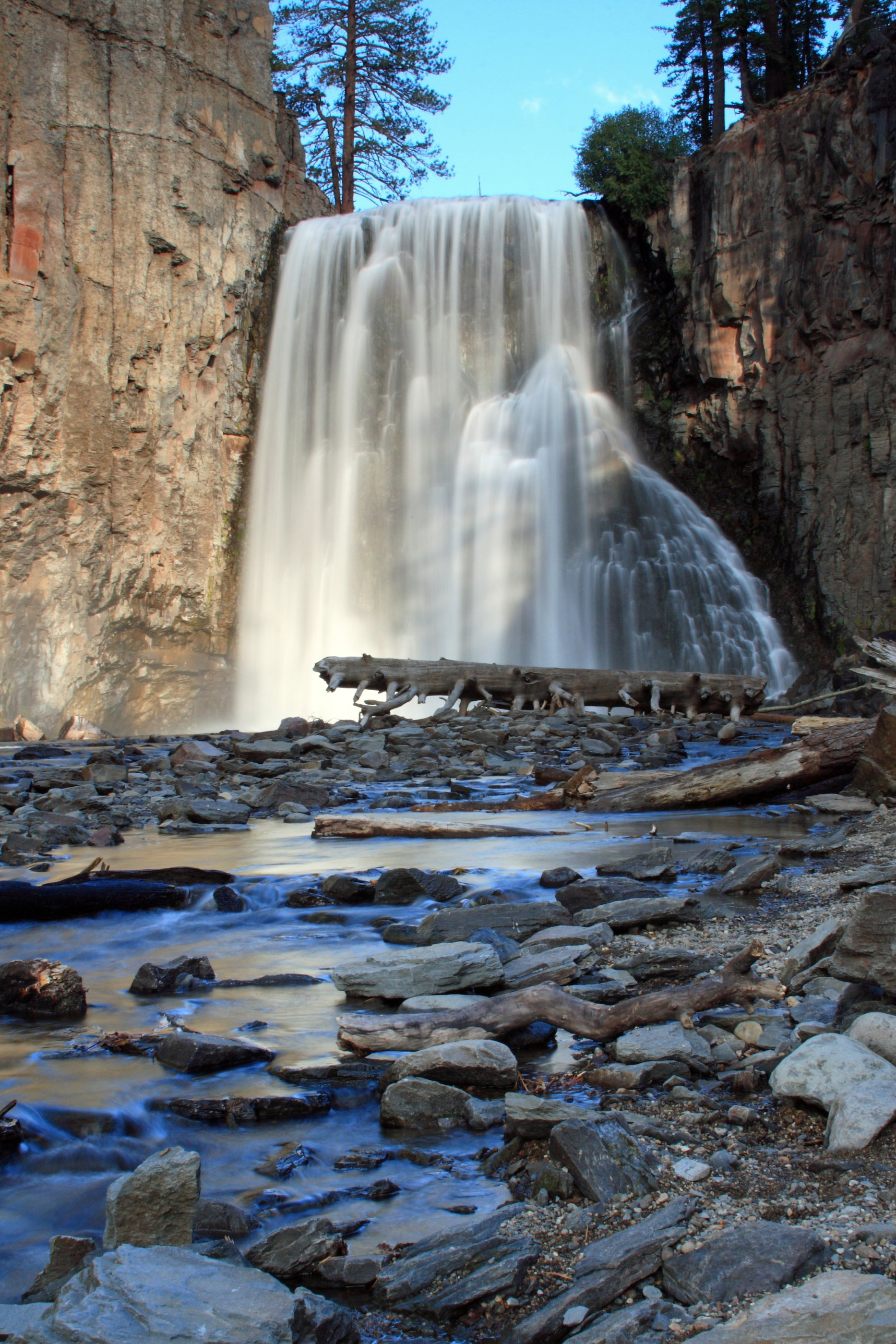

- Location within California
- Location: Devils Postpile National Monument, Madera County, California, United States
- Coordinates: 37°36′06″N 119°05′00″W
- Elevation: 7,415 feet (2,260 m)
- Total height: 101 feet (31 m)
- Number of drops: 1
- Watercourse: San Joaquin River

Rainbow Falls is the highest waterfall on the Middle Fork of the San Joaquin River, in the eastern Sierra Nevada mountains of California, in the United States. Plunging 101 feet (31 m) to the turbulent water below, the falls are named for the rainbows that appear in their mist on sunny summer days. Rainbow Falls is located within the boundaries of Devils Postpile National Monument.

About 75,000 years ago, lava erupted from a vent just east of the present-day falls. The eruption occurred in two stages. The first pulse of lava flowed about 1 kilometre (0.62 mi) westward and pooled in the Middle Fork of the San Joaquin drainage. The second pulse of lava insulated the first, allowing it to cool slowly and to fracture vertically. The layer above cooled under different conditions and fractured horizontally. Geologists describe these rocks as platy rhyodacite; they are visible in the cliffs that surround Rainbow Falls.

As water rushes over the cliff, it erodes the vertically fractured rhyodacite more easily. A small cavern begins to form at the base of the falls, and the overlying rock loses its support and collapses. This process, known as undercutting, causes the waterfall to recede slowly upstream. To date Rainbow Falls has retreated about 500 feet (150 m) due to undercutting.

== See also ==
- List of waterfalls
- List of waterfalls in California
