= Lake Mary (California) =

Lake in the state of California, United States

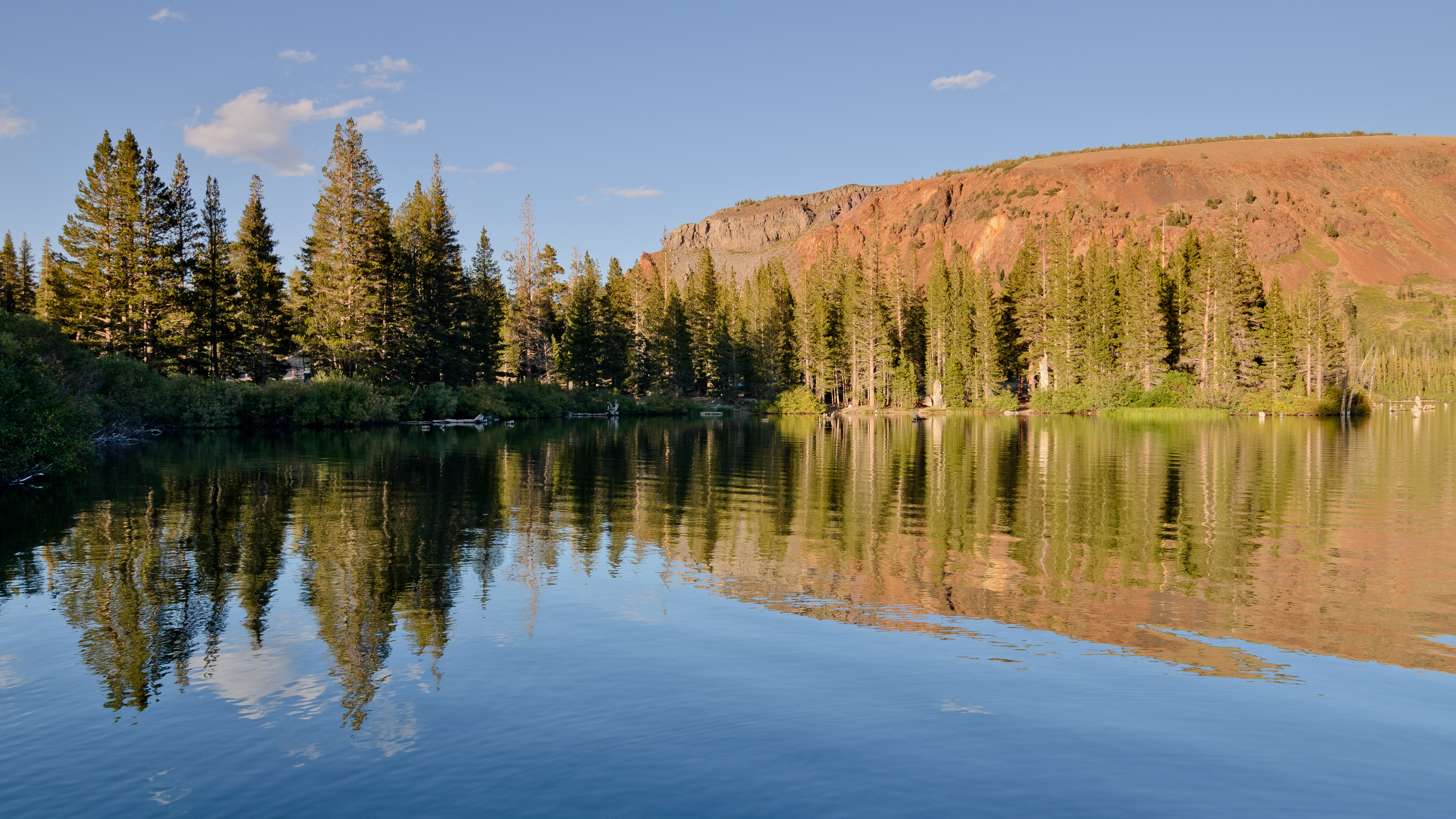
- Lake Mary viewed from the west

- Location within California Location within the United States
- Location: Mono County, California
- Coordinates: 37°36′10″N 119°00′10″W
- Basin countries: United States
- Surface elevation: 8,966 ft (2,733 m)

Lake Mary is a freshwater lake and the largest of the Mammoth Lakes in Mono County, California. Lake Mary has a campground on its northwest end and can be used for rainbow trout, brook, and brown trout fishing. The lake also features two marinas with motorboat and kayak rental.

The lake is accessible from the town of Mammoth Lakes via Lake Mary Road and is surrounded by the scenic Around Lake Mary Road.

According to the Eastern California Museum's interview with Maude Kemp (resident of Independence, California, born 1895), Lake Mary was named after Maude's grandmother, Mary Calvert (wife of Maude's grandfather, George Calvert).

== Climate ==
Lake Mary has a warm-summer humid continental climate (Dsb) with long, very snowy winters, and warm, dry summers.

Climate data for Lake Mary, 37°36′10″N 119°00′10″W, 8,999 ft (2,743 m), 1991–2020 normals
Month	Jan	Feb	Mar	Apr	May	Jun	Jul	Aug	Sep	Oct	Nov	Dec	Year
Mean daily maximum °F (°C)	39.3 (4.1)	39.3 (4.1)	43.4 (6.3)	47.7 (8.7)	55.3 (12.9)	65.1 (18.4)	72.9 (22.7)	72.4 (22.4)	66.4 (19.1)	56.6 (13.7)	45.3 (7.4)	38.3 (3.5)	53.5 (11.9)
Daily mean °F (°C)	27.5 (−2.5)	26.9 (−2.8)	30.0 (−1.1)	34.2 (1.2)	41.7 (5.4)	50.4 (10.2)	57.8 (14.3)	57.0 (13.9)	51.5 (10.8)	43.1 (6.2)	33.6 (0.9)	27.1 (−2.7)	40.1 (4.5)
Mean daily minimum °F (°C)	15.8 (−9.0)	14.6 (−9.7)	16.6 (−8.6)	20.7 (−6.3)	28.0 (−2.2)	35.7 (2.1)	42.7 (5.9)	41.6 (5.3)	36.5 (2.5)	29.5 (−1.4)	21.9 (−5.6)	15.9 (−8.9)	26.6 (−3.0)
Average precipitation inches (mm)	10.19 (259)	8.56 (217)	7.70 (196)	4.46 (113)	2.72 (69)	0.64 (16)	0.46 (12)	0.35 (8.9)	0.41 (10)	2.34 (59)	3.45 (88)	8.70 (221)	49.98 (1,268.9)
Source: PRISM Climate Group
