= Emerald Lake (Trinity County, California) =

Lake in California, United States

- Location within California Location within the United States
- Location: Trinity County, California, United States
- Coordinates: 41°00′19″N 122°59′51″W
- Basin countries: United States
- Max. length: 1,970 ft (600 m)
- Max. width: 700 ft (210 m)
- Surface elevation: 5,500 ft (1,700 m)

Emerald Lake is a lake located in the Trinity Alps Wilderness area, in Northern California. The lake sits in a granite bowl, approximately 5,500 ft (1,700 m) above sea level. It is dammed with a rock wall constructed many years ago when the area was used by miners. Visitors can still find old rusty pieces of their equipment around the lake, including giant gears, winches, and cables.

Visitors can access the lake by hiking the Stuart Fork Trail, and the lake is downstream of Sapphire Lake.

== See also ==
- List of lakes in California
