= Sapphire Lake (Trinity County, California) =

Lake in the state of California, United States

- Location within California Location within the United States
- Location: Trinity County, California
- Coordinates: 40°59′56″N 123°00′42″W
- Type: Glacial
- Basin countries: United States
- Surface elevation: 5,882 ft (1,793 m)

Sapphire Lake is a lake located in the Trinity Alps Wilderness area, in Northern California. The lake sits in a granite bowl, where it is fed by rainwater that runs down the surrounding mountains. Sapphire Lake sits just southwest of, and approximately 300 ft (91 m) above Emerald Lake. The surface of the lake is 5,882 ft (1,793 m) above sea level.

Visitors can access the lake by hiking the Stuart Fork Trail and continuing past Emerald Lake.

== See also ==
- List of lakes in California
