= Mammoth Lakes, California =

Town in California, United States

- Town
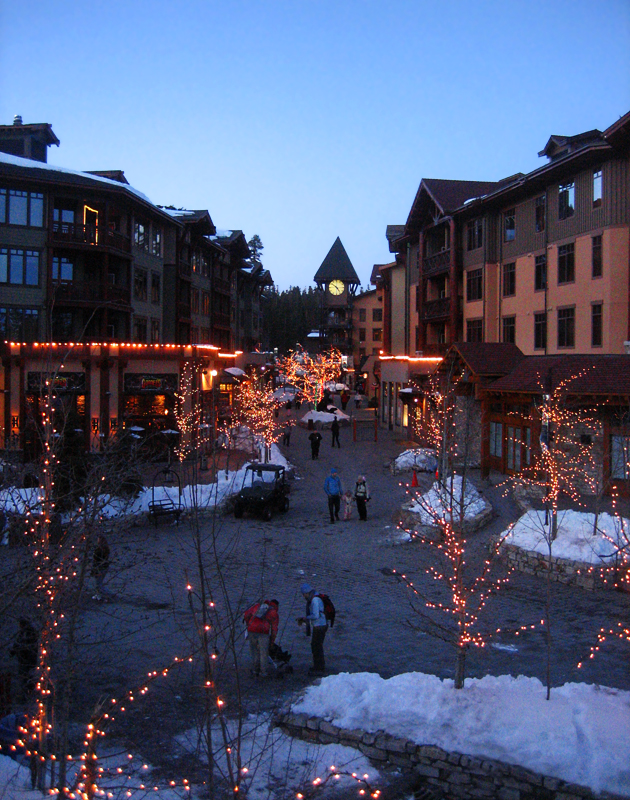
- The "Village" section of town

- Seal
- Interactive map of Mammoth Lakes, California
- Location in California
- Coordinates: 37°37′38″N 118°59′24″W
- Country: United States
- State: California
- County: Mono
- Incorporated (town): August 20, 1984

Government
  - Type: Council-Manager
  - Mayor: Chris Bubser

Area
  - Total: 25.31 sq mi (65.54 km^{2})
  - Land: 24.86 sq mi (64.40 km^{2})
  - Water: 0.44 sq mi (1.14 km^{2}) 1.74%
- Elevation: 8,075 ft (2,461 m)

Population (2020)
  - Total: 7,191
  - Density: 289.2/sq mi (111.66/km^{2})
- Time zone: UTC-8 (PST)
  - Summer (DST): UTC-7 (PDT)
- ZIP code: 93546
- Area code: 442/760
- FIPS code: 06-45358
- GNIS feature ID: 2412936
- Website: www.townofmammothlakes.ca.gov

Mammoth Lakes is the only incorporated town in Mono County, California, United States. It is located immediately to the east of Mammoth Mountain, at an elevation of 7,880 feet (2,400 m). As of the 2020 United States census, the population was 7,191, representing a decrease of 12.7% from the 8,234 recorded in the 2010 Census.

== History ==
The Mono people were the first settlers of the Mammoth Lakes area, thousands of years ago. They settled in the valley but traveled by foot to other areas when trading with different tribes.

The European history of Mammoth Lakes started in 1877, when four prospectors staked a claim on Mineral Hill, south of the current town, along Old Mammoth Road. In 1878, the Mammoth Mining Company was organized to mine Mineral Hill, which caused a gold rush. By the end of 1878, 1,500 people settled in the mining camp called Mammoth City. The winters of 1879 and 1880 brought heavy snowfall, which, alongside the company shutting down in early 1880, began a population decline. In November 1880, a large fire destroyed almost half of the settlement, furthering the decline. By 1888, the population declined to fewer than 10 people.

By the early 1900s, the town of Mammoth (known today as "Old Mammoth") was informally established near Mammoth Creek. The economy of the original town was based on logging and tourism. The first post office at Mammoth Lakes opened in 1923. The completion of Highway 203 in 1937 led many businesses from Old Mammoth to relocate north to the modern-day location of the town.

In 1971, a group of Mammoth Lakes residents filed a lawsuit against two proposed apartment buildings, arguing the development violated the California Environmental Quality Act (CEQA). Prior to the lawsuit, CEQA was commonly understood as only applying to publicly funded developments. In 1972, the California Supreme Court ruled the developer required an environmental impact study. Known as the Friends of Mammoth Interpretive Principle, the decision set the precedent of requiring all public or private developments in California that required government authorization, be subject to the CEQA rules.

In 2004, the Mammoth Ski Museum opened in town. The museum featured many vintage artifacts, photographs, and posters. A movie documenting the life of the founder of the ski resort (Dave McCoy) and those of early famous skiers in the area is shown. In 2010, photographs taken by Dave McCoy were featured in an exhibit at the museum.

In 2008, after a jury trial, the Mono County Superior Court entered a $43 million judgment against the Town of Mammoth Lakes for breach of a development agreement. The California Court of Appeal, Third District, affirmed the judgment in December 2010, and the California Supreme Court declined to hear the appeal on March 23, 2011. On Monday July 2, 2012, Mammoth Lakes filed for bankruptcy in the face of the judgement. Later the same year, the bankruptcy was dismissed as a result of a settlement between the town and its largest creditor.

== Geography ==
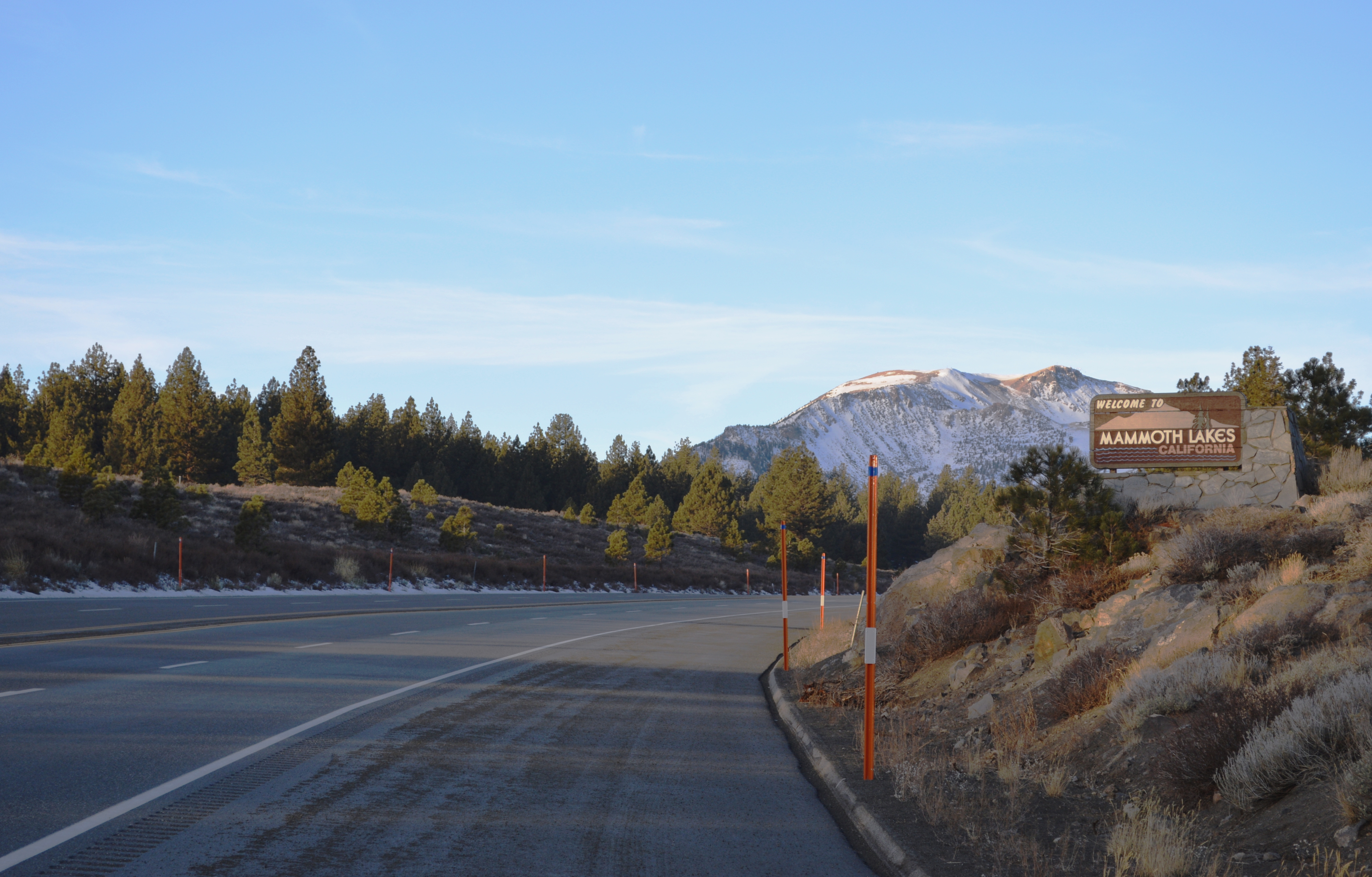
"Welcome to Mammoth Lakes, California"

According to the United States Census Bureau, the town has a total area of 25.3 square miles (66 km^{2}), of which 24.9 mi^{2} (64 km^{2}) are land, and 0.4 mi^{2} (1.0 km^{2}) (1.74%) water.

Mammoth Lakes lies on the edge of the Long Valley Caldera. The area around the town is geologically active, with hot springs and rhyolite domes that are less than 1000 years old.

Visitors can take State Route 203 from the town of Mammoth Lakes to the Mammoth Mountain Ski Area, over Minaret Summit, then down to Devils Postpile National Monument, with access to the Ansel Adams Wilderness.

The area has natural hot springs, some of which offer bathing opportunities and are popular with both locals and visitors. Other features include lakes, soda springs, and an obsidian dome. Mammoth Lakes is north of the Owens Valley, a scenic area with extensive hiking opportunities. Lake Mary is south of the town and has recreation facilities.

The town is surrounded by mountains: on the west, Mammoth Mountain looms over the town, while to the south, the Sherwin Range dominates the view. This hilly terrain and the high altitude makes the area great for high-altitude athletic training, including among elite long-distance runners, who live and train in the thin air.

The town is surrounded by acres of forest and is bordered by the Ansel Adams and John Muir Wilderness Areas. The eastern entrance of Yosemite National Park is located 32 miles (51 km) north of town. The town is situated in the southwestern, mountainous part of Mono County, California.

=== Climate ===
Mammoth Lakes has a warm-summer humid continental climate (Dsb) with long, very snowy winters, and warm, dry summers. Snowfall is particularly heavy from December through March, and averages 206 inches (5.23 m) per season. On average, there are 21 days of 80 °F (27 °C)+ highs, twenty-one days of highs under 32 °F (0.0 °C) and 4.6 nights of sub-0 °F (−18 °C) lows annually.

In the wake of the 2022–2023 California floods, Mammoth Lakes was the snowiest place in North America.

Climate data for Mammoth Lakes, California, 1991–2020 normals, extremes 1993–2021
Month	Jan	Feb	Mar	Apr	May	Jun	Jul	Aug	Sep	Oct	Nov	Dec	Year
Record high °F (°C)	67 (19)	66 (19)	68 (20)	73 (23)	81 (27)	86 (30)	91 (33)	88 (31)	83 (28)	80 (27)	70 (21)	64 (18)	91 (33)
Mean maximum °F (°C)	54.9 (12.7)	55.3 (12.9)	58.8 (14.9)	66.9 (19.4)	73.4 (23.0)	82.2 (27.9)	85.4 (29.7)	83.7 (28.7)	78.9 (26.1)	71.9 (22.2)	62.6 (17.0)	56.1 (13.4)	86.3 (30.2)
Mean daily maximum °F (°C)	41.2 (5.1)	41.0 (5.0)	45.5 (7.5)	51.2 (10.7)	60.4 (15.8)	70.3 (21.3)	77.8 (25.4)	77.4 (25.2)	71.3 (21.8)	60.7 (15.9)	49.3 (9.6)	41.4 (5.2)	57.3 (14.0)
Daily mean °F (°C)	28.4 (−2.0)	28.9 (−1.7)	33.2 (0.7)	38.6 (3.7)	47.4 (8.6)	56.2 (13.4)	62.9 (17.2)	61.9 (16.6)	55.5 (13.1)	45.5 (7.5)	36.2 (2.3)	29.2 (−1.6)	43.7 (6.5)
Mean daily minimum °F (°C)	15.6 (−9.1)	16.7 (−8.5)	21.9 (−5.6)	26.1 (−3.3)	33.5 (0.8)	42.2 (5.7)	47.9 (8.8)	46.4 (8.0)	39.8 (4.3)	30.2 (−1.0)	23.2 (−4.9)	17.1 (−8.3)	30.1 (−1.1)
Mean minimum °F (°C)	0.6 (−17.4)	0.3 (−17.6)	5.9 (−14.5)	11.6 (−11.3)	22.9 (−5.1)	29.7 (−1.3)	40.8 (4.9)	39.7 (4.3)	26.4 (−3.1)	16.0 (−8.9)	6.2 (−14.3)	−2.1 (−18.9)	−5.3 (−20.7)
Record low °F (°C)	−16 (−27)	−11 (−24)	−8 (−22)	−1 (−18)	13 (−11)	17 (−8)	25 (−4)	30 (−1)	13 (−11)	8 (−13)	−8 (−22)	−12 (−24)	−16 (−27)
Average precipitation inches (mm)	4.20 (107)	3.77 (96)	3.28 (83)	1.54 (39)	1.49 (38)	0.47 (12)	0.51 (13)	0.49 (12)	0.47 (12)	1.43 (36)	2.00 (51)	4.07 (103)	23.72 (602)
Average snowfall inches (cm)	33.5 (85)	35.5 (90)	29.6 (75)	13.4 (34)	3.9 (9.9)	0.0 (0.0)	0.0 (0.0)	0.0 (0.0)	0.4 (1.0)	5.3 (13)	13.6 (35)	34.4 (87)	169.6 (429.9)
Average extreme snow depth inches (cm)	33.1 (84)	34.9 (89)	35.8 (91)	17.2 (44)	3.3 (8.4)	0.0 (0.0)	0.0 (0.0)	0.0 (0.0)	0.2 (0.51)	2.7 (6.9)	8.1 (21)	20.7 (53)	40.6 (103)
Average precipitation days (≥ 0.01 in)	5.5	7.4	8.1	5.9	5.5	2.6	3.4	1.6	1.9	4.6	4.9	7.5	58.9
Average snowy days (≥ 0.1 in)	4.9	6.5	6.7	4.3	1.7	0.0	0.0	0.0	0.1	1.2	3.4	6.3	35.1
Source 1: NOAA
Source 2: National Weather Service (mean maxima and minima, snow/snow days/snow depth, precip days 2006–2020)

== Demographics ==
Historical population
Census	Pop.	Note	%±
1880	473		—
1980	3,929		—
1990	4,785		21.8%
2000	7,093		48.2%
2010	8,234		16.1%
2020	7,191		−12.7%
U.S. Decennial Census

=== 2020 census ===
As of the 2020 census, Mammoth Lakes had a population of 7,191. The population density was 289.2 inhabitants per square mile (111.7/km^{2}). The median age was 36.5 years. 20.9% of residents were under the age of 18, 7.7% were aged 18 to 24, 34.4% were aged 25 to 44, 26.0% were aged 45 to 64, and 11.0% were 65 years of age or older. For every 100 females, there were 118.2 males, and for every 100 females age 18 and over, there were 123.9 males age 18 and over.

Racial composition as of the 2020 census
Race	Number	Percent
White	4,775	66.4%
Black or African American	35	0.5%
American Indian and Alaska Native	95	1.3%
Asian	104	1.4%
Native Hawaiian and Other Pacific Islander	13	0.2%
Some other race	1,272	17.7%
Two or more races	897	12.5%
Hispanic or Latino (of any race)	2,395	33.3%

The census reported that 98.4% of the population lived in households, 1.6% lived in non-institutionalized group quarters, and no one was institutionalized. In addition, 98.0% of residents lived in urban areas, while 2.0% lived in rural areas.

There were 2,934 households, out of which 31.4% included children under the age of 18. Of all households, 41.9% were married-couple households, 9.3% were cohabiting couple households, 29.2% had a male householder with no spouse or partner present, and 19.6% had a female householder with no spouse or partner present. 28.2% of households were one person, and 7.2% were one person aged 65 or older. The average household size was 2.41. There were 1,720 families (58.6% of all households).

There were 9,330 housing units at an average density of 375.2 units per square mile (144.9 units/km^{2}), of which 2,934 (31.4%) were occupied and 68.6% were vacant. Of occupied units, 47.6% were owner-occupied and 52.4% were occupied by renters. The homeowner vacancy rate was 1.9%, and the rental vacancy rate was 22.6%.

=== Income and poverty ===
In 2023, the US Census Bureau estimated that the median household income was $87,121, and the per capita income was $56,390. About 4.4% of families and 8.6% of the population were below the poverty line.

=== 2010 census ===
The 2010 United States census reported that Mammoth Lakes had a population of 8,234. The population density was 325.4 inhabitants per square mile (125.6/km^{2}). The racial makeup of Mammoth Lakes was 6,643 (80.7%) White, 29 (0.4%) African American, 49 (0.6%) Native American, 128 (1.6%) Asian, 5 (0.1%) Pacific Islander, 1,151 (14.0%) from other races, and 229 (2.8%) from two or more races. Hispanic or Latino of any race were 2,772 persons (33.7%).

The Census reported that 8,076 people (98.1% of the population) lived in households, 158 (1.9%) lived in non-institutionalized group quarters, and 0 (0%) were institutionalized.

There were 3,229 households, out of which 942 (29.2%) had children under the age of 18 living in them, 1,401 (43.4%) were opposite-sex married couples living together, 177 (5.5%) had a female householder with no husband present, 144 (4.5%) had a male householder with no wife present. There were 293 (9.1%) unmarried opposite-sex partnerships, and 13 (0.4%) same-sex married couples or partnerships. 899 households (27.8%) were made up of individuals, and 153 (4.7%) had someone living alone who was 65 years of age or older. The average household size was 2.50. There were 1,722 families (53.3% of all households); the average family size was 3.14.

The population was spread out, with 1,719 people (20.9%) under the age of 18, 1,050 people (12.8%) aged 18 to 24, 2,833 people (34.4%) aged 25 to 44, 2,100 people (25.5%) aged 45 to 64, and 532 people (6.5%) who were 65 years of age or older. The median age was 32.6 years. For every 100 females, there were 121.4 males. For every 100 females age 18 and over, there were 127.0 males.

There were 9,626 housing units at an average density of 380.4 per square mile (146.9/km^{2}), of which 1,502 (46.5%) were owner-occupied, and 1,727 (53.5%) were occupied by renters. The homeowner vacancy rate was 3.4%; the rental vacancy rate was 33.6%. 3,464 people (42.1% of the population) lived in owner-occupied housing units and 4,612 people (56.0%) lived in rental housing units.

== Economy ==
Mammoth Lakes' economy is primarily tourism-based. A 13% tax is added to the rental of any lodging facility and campgrounds for stays of less than a month. There are more than 4,599 rental units in Mammoth Lakes and the lodging industry generates around two-thirds of the gross revenue of the Town of Mammoth Lakes. As well as the pull from winter extreme sports, Mammoth Lakes also benefits greatly from tourism in the summer from people who visit to camp, hike and fish.

The Mammoth Lakes real estate market has gone through ups and downs over the past few decades. In 1980, an earthquake with magnitude of 6.1 on the Richter scale sent area property values plummeting on fears of a potential volcanic eruption similar to the 1980 eruption of Mount St. Helens. A significant real estate surplus formed after this, during which Mammoth Lakes had a total of over 1200 properties on the market. The development of the Mammoth Mountain ski area has had a direct effect on housing in more recent years. The tourist market has led to an explosion of property values. This peaked in 2003 when the median property value reached $750,000. Another peak occurred in 2006 with the sale of the Mammoth Mountain ski area to Starwood Capital Group. As of August 2022, the median listing price was again $752,000.

Mammoth Lakes is home to Mammoth Brewing Company and Distant Brewing (previously known as Black Doubt Brewing Company.)

== Government ==
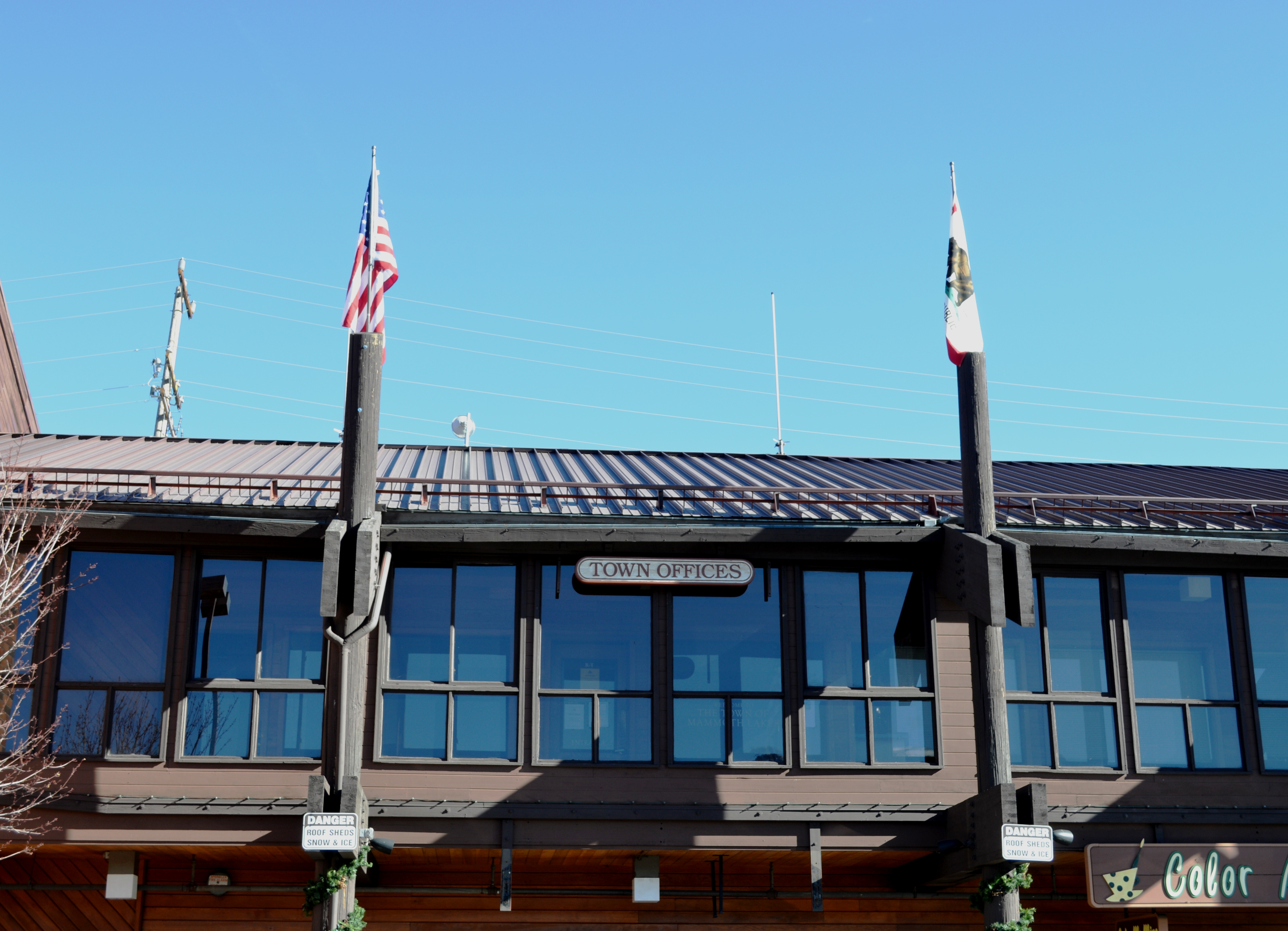
The Town Offices of Mammoth Lakes

The municipal government of Mammoth Lakes is of the council–manager type. The town council consists of five members serving staggered four-year terms. A mayor and a mayor pro tem are selected from town council on an annually rotating basis. Law enforcement is provided by the Mammoth Lakes Police Department and fire protection is provided by the Mammoth Lakes Fire Protection District. Emergency medical service is provided by Mono County operating out of Mammoth Lakes Fire Station #1.

In the California State Legislature, Mammoth Lakes is in the 4th senatorial district, represented by Republican Marie Alvarado-Gil, and in the 8th Assembly district, represented by Republican David Tangipa.

In the United States House of Representatives, Mammoth Lakes is in California's 3rd congressional district, represented by Independent Kevin Kiley.

== Education ==
The Mammoth Unified School District, which covers the entire town, includes the following schools: Mammoth Elementary School, Mammoth Middle School, Mammoth High School, Sierra High School, and Mammoth High School ILC.

The Mono County Office of Education offers an alternative high school, the Jan Work Community School, where highly motivated students are allowed to earn credits more quickly than may be earned in a traditional semester.

The Mammoth Lakes Campus of Cerro Coso Community College is also known as the Eastern Sierra College Center. It was established in 1998 and is accredited by the Accrediting Commission for Community and Junior Colleges (ACCJC).

The Mammoth Lakes Library opened in December 2007.

== Transportation ==
Mammoth Lakes receives scheduled passenger airline service seasonally via the Eastern Sierra Regional Airport in Bishop with nonstop regional jet service operated to Los Angeles (LAX), San Francisco (SFO) and Denver (DEN) on United Express operated by SkyWest Airlines. It also has Mammoth Yosemite Airport, which primarily serves general aviation but also has limited scheduled service.

Local and intercity bus service is provided by Eastern Sierra Transit Authority. Yosemite Area Regional Transportation System provides summer bus connections to Yosemite.

== In popular culture ==
Various western films have been shot by Mammoth Lakes. Examples include Thundering Hoofs (1924), The Border Legion (1924), Beyond the Rockies (1932), Flaming Guns (1932), The Trail Beyond (1934), Call of the Wild (1935), Moonlight on the Prairie (1935), King of the Royal Mounted (1936), God's Country and the Woman (1937), Cassidy of Bar 20 (1938), Hawk of the Wilderness (1938), Knights of the Range (1940), Melody Ranch (1940), Sierra Sue (1941), The Return of Frank James (1940), Flame of the Barbary Coast (1945), Frontier Gal (1945), and Rose Marie (1954).

== Notable people ==
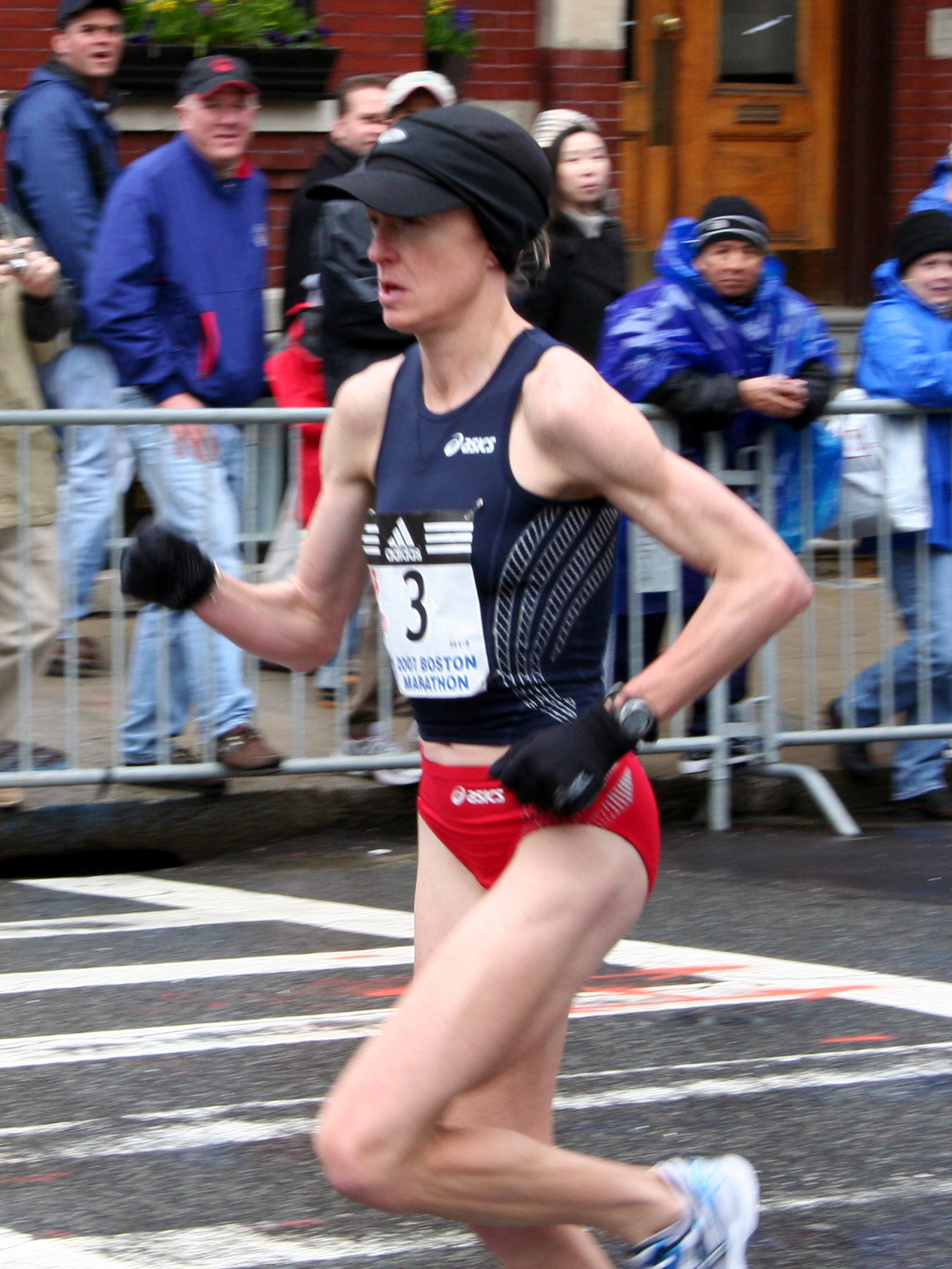
Deena (Drossin) Kastor

- John Bachar, deceased 2009, professional rock climber known for free soloing
- Josh Cox, former 50k US record holder
- Trevor Donovan, actor who played Teddy Montgomery from CW Network's hit series 90210
- Trace Gallagher, Fox News anchor and reporter, who grew up in Mammoth Lakes
- Bill Green, former U.S. and NCAA record holder in Track and Field, 5th place in the Hammer Throw at the 1984 Olympic Games owned property in Mammoth from 1995-2008
- Ryan Hall, runner of the fastest marathon ever by an American, 2:04:58, at the 2011 Boston Marathon
- Deena (Drossin) Kastor, 2004 Olympic bronze medalist in the marathon and winner of the London Marathon in 2006
- Meb Keflezighi, 2004 Olympic silver medalist in the marathon and winner of the New York City Marathon in 2009 and the Boston Marathon in 2014.
- Chloe Kim, Winter X Games snowboarder and 2018 and 2022 Olympic gold medalist.
- A total of six Mammoth Lakes residents competed in the 2014 Winter Olympics in Sochi, Russia; Kelly Clark, Greg Bretz, John Teller, Trevor Jacob and Stacey Cook represented the U.S. while Kaya Turski represented Canada.

== See also ==
- List of lakes in California
- Convict Lake
- Mammoth Times
