= Trinity Lake =

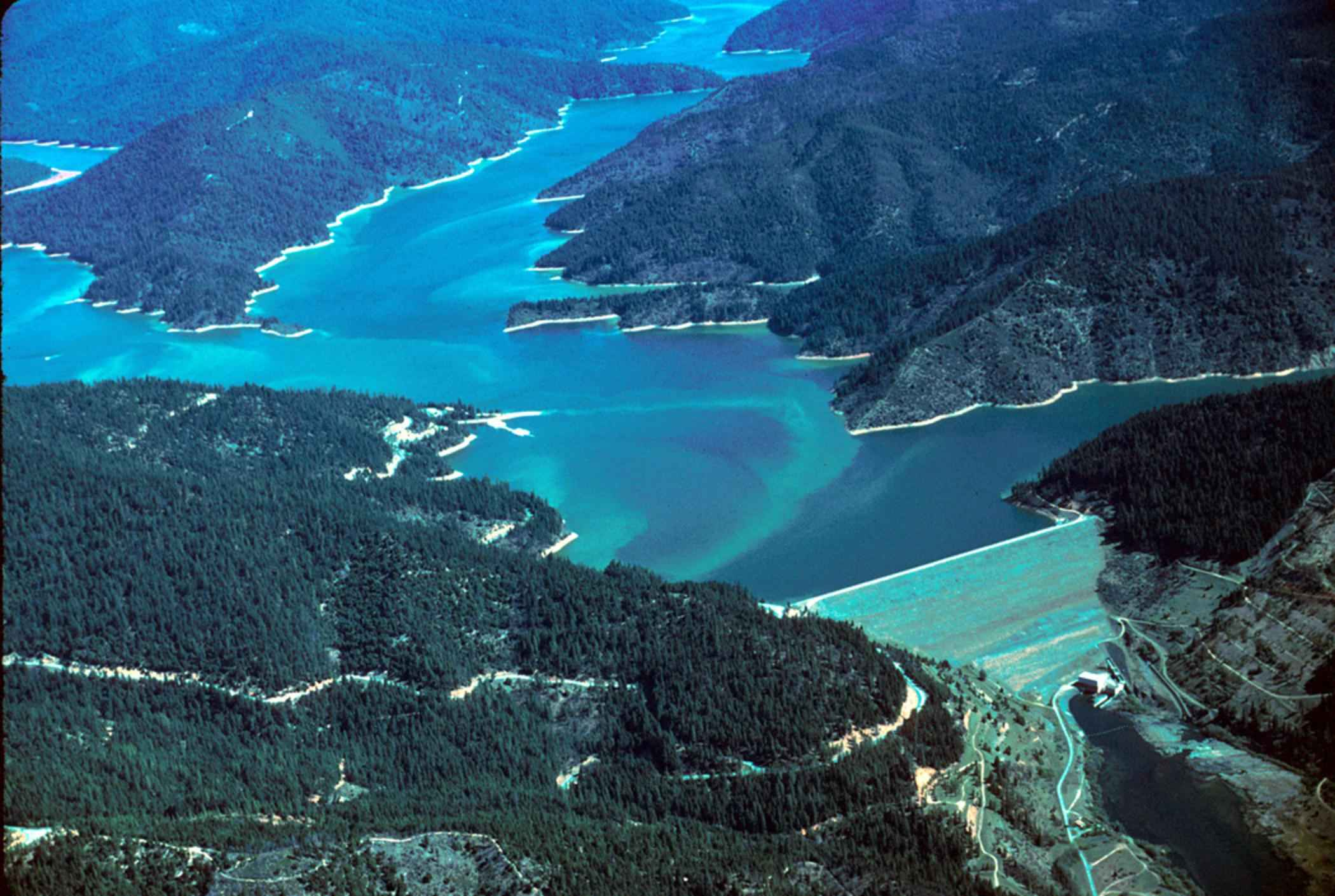

- Location within California Location within the United States
- Location: Trinity County, California
- Coordinates: 40°49′21″N 122°45′54″W
- Type: Reservoir
- Primary inflows: Trinity River, Stuart Fork, East Fork Trinity River
- Primary outflows: Trinity River
- Basin countries: United States
- Managing agency: United States Bureau of Reclamation
- Water volume: 2,447,650 acre⋅ft (3,019.13 GL)
- Surface elevation: 2,387 ft (728 m)
- Website: www.fs.usda.gov/r05/shasta-trinity/recreation

Trinity Lake, previously called Clair Engle Lake, is a reservoir on the Trinity River formed by the Trinity Dam and located in Trinity County, California, United States. The dam was built by the U.S. Bureau of Reclamation. The lake's capacity is 2,447,650 acre⋅ft (3,019.13 GL), making it one of the largest reservoirs in California. The lake's surface is at 2,370 ft (720 m) above MSL. Trinity Lake captures and stores water for the Central Valley Project, which provides the Central Valley with water for irrigation and produces hydroelectric power. This lake is known for its many small arms, glassy inlets, and good water-skiing conditions.

After the death in office of California United States Senator Clair Engle in 1964, the lake was renamed after him. The name change never received wide popularity and the name was returned to the original name.

The lake is serviced by three marinas: Trinity Alps Marina located on the southern end in view of the Dam; Cedar Stock marina on the Stuart Fork arm on the west end of the lake; and Trinity Center marina at the northern end of the main arm of the lake. Most of the marinas rent houseboats to vacationers year round.

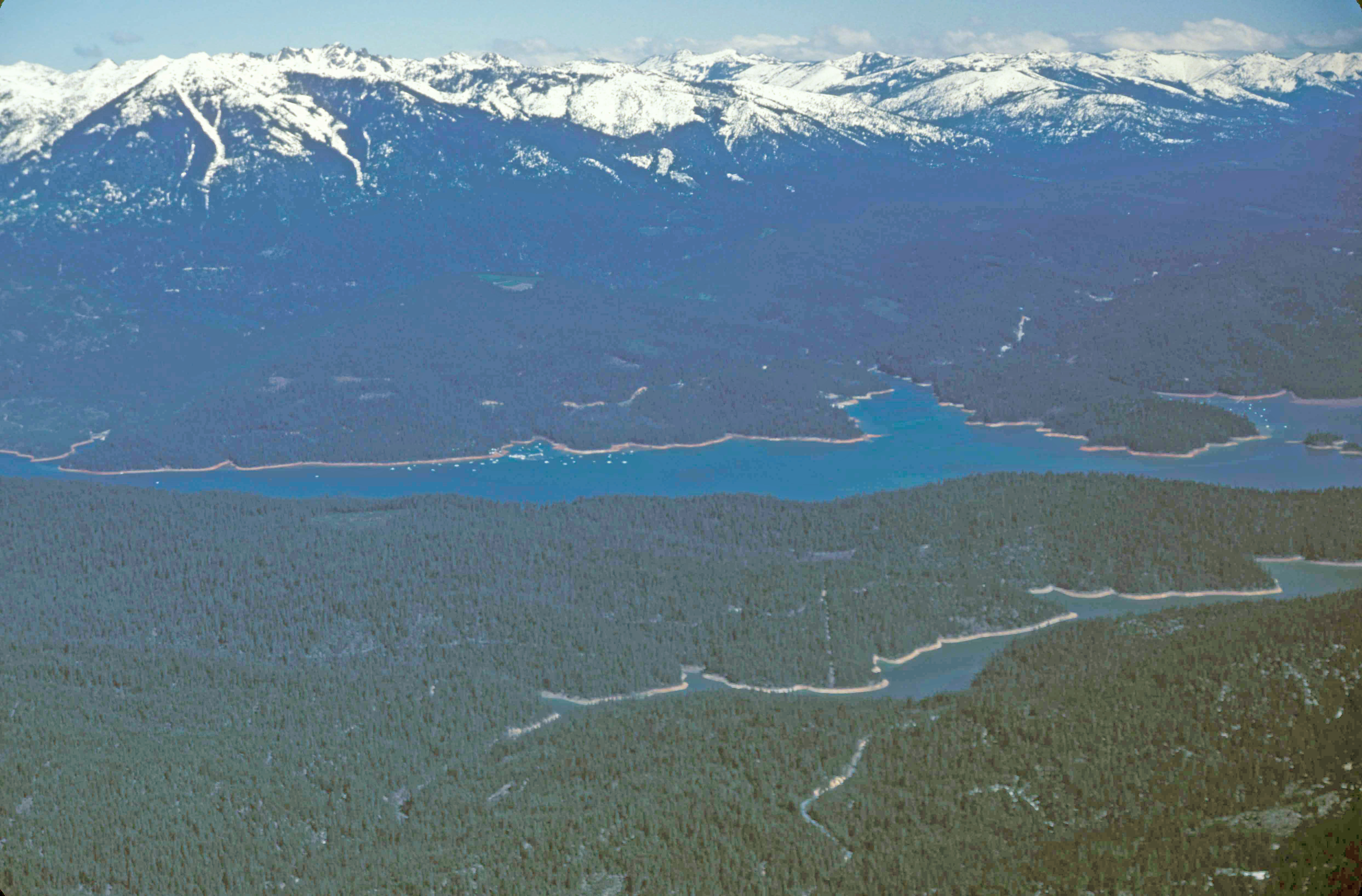
View of Trinity Lake

== Geology ==
Trinity Lake is located northwest of Redding, off of Highway 299 north-northeast of the Gold Rush mining town of Weaverville. The Alpine scenery surrounding the lake makes up the Trinity Alps. The Alps were formed in the late Jurassic Period by volcanic activity in the form of ultramafic and granitic plutons (igneous rock formed from super-heated magma cooling under the surface of the earth), and tectonic activity (the super continent of Pangaea was beginning to pull apart into two separate super-sized continents) and glaciation during frigid climate periods known as ice ages (land surface modified by action of glaciers). The last remaining glaciers are on Thompson's peak, at more than 9,000 feet (2,700 m). The lake bed was originally a series of deep valleys in the Alps.

== History ==
The discovery of gold in 1848 prompted hundreds of miners to move into the area. In 1958, a plan to divert water from Trinity River to California's Central Valley led to the construction of Trinity Dam and the creation of Trinity Lake. This project was also designed to provide hydroelectric power to the local area. The Trinity River Division of the Central Valley Project came to fruition in 1961 with the completion of Trinity Dam. The lake was renamed Clair Engle Lake from 1964 to 1997 until its original name was revived. The lake was completely filled with water from the Trinity River by 1963 and is the third largest lake in California with 145 miles (233 km) of shoreline.

== Recreation ==
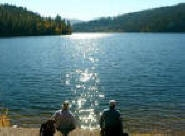
View at Trinity Lake

Trinity Lake is less used by vacationers than the lower Lake Shasta due in part to the lengthy winding road up from the valley floor. Typical drive time from Redding (Interstate 5) to the lake is about 90 minutes along a winding mountain road. This makes it a destination spot for fishing and water sports. Popular fishing includes that of smallmouth and largemouth bass, catfish, kokanee, rainbow and brown trout. Fish remain ample, despite the negative impact that the dams have had on spawning ground in part due to the Trinity River Fish Hatchery, located just below Lewiston Dam.

The California Office of Environmental Health Hazard Assessment (OEHHA) has developed a safe eating advisory for fish caught in Trinity Lake based on levels of mercury or PCBs found in local species.

House boating, speed boating, and waterskiing are also popular lake activities. Surrounding the lake, visitors enjoy hiking and camping in the pristine wilderness of the Trinity Alps and the Shasta-Trinity National Forest.

== Wildlife ==
There has been a dramatic decline in various fish species in the river since the dams were built and the lake created. Spawning steelhead, Chinook and Coho Salmon populations have all been affected by their loss of spawning ground. However, wildlife populations surrounding the lake remain strong. Black bears are common, so proper precautions must be taken to secure campsites, throw away garbage and store food safely. Additional wildlife includes bobcats, mountain lions and many different bird species. The lake contains land-locked populations of kokanee salmon and king salmon, along with more typical California lake species such as largemouth and smallmouth bass, rainbow trout and catfish.

== See also ==
- List of dams and reservoirs in California
- List of lakes in California
- List of largest reservoirs in the United States
- List of largest reservoirs of California
