= Devils Postpile National Monument =

National monument in California, United States

The Devils Postpile National Monument
- IUCN category III (natural monument or feature)
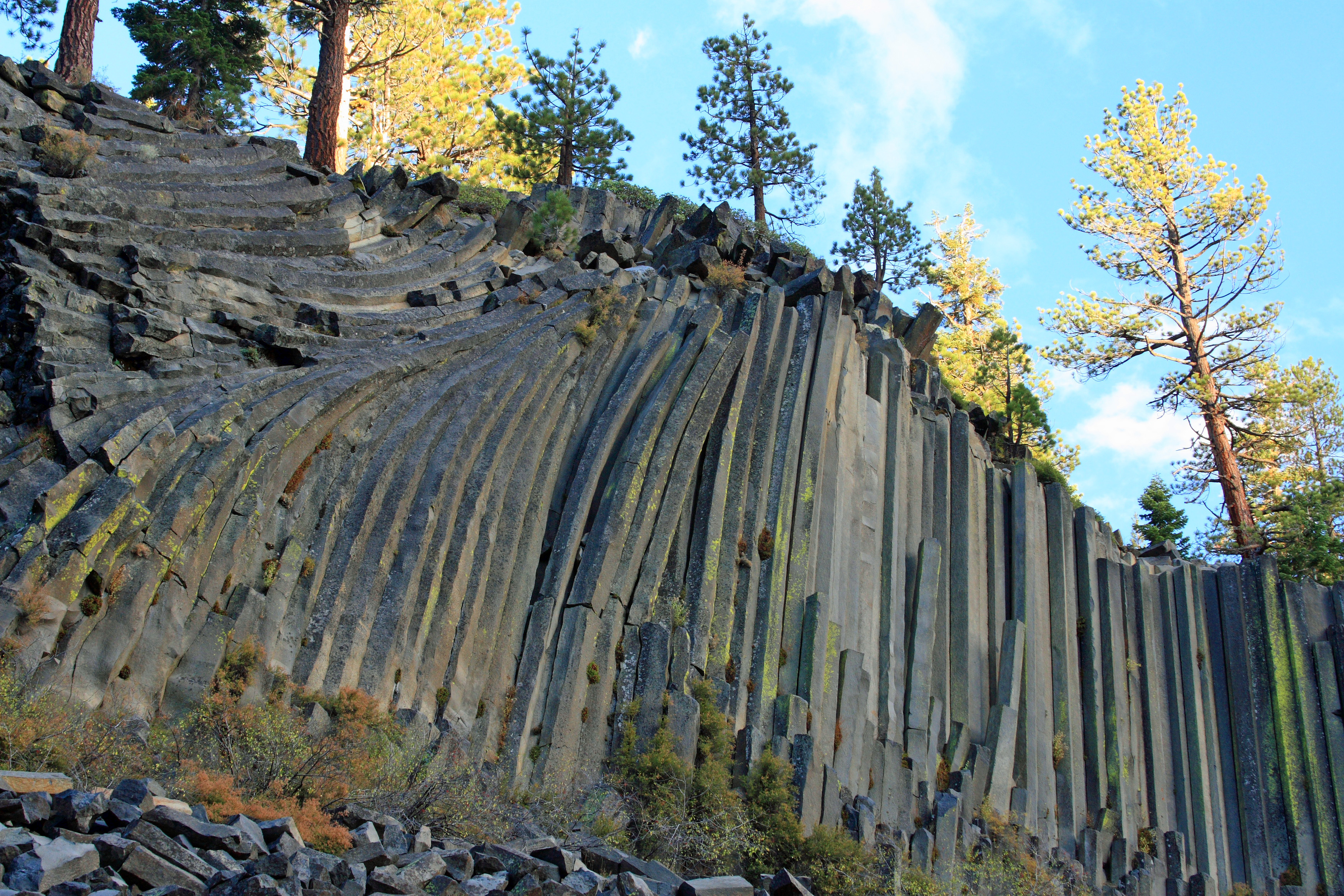
- Basalt columns of Devils Postpile

- Location within California Location within the United States
- Interactive map of The Devils Postpile National Monument
- Location: Madera County, California, United States
- Nearest city: Mammoth Lakes, CA
- Coordinates: 37°37′28″N 119°5′4″W
- Area: 798 acres (323 ha)
- Created: July 6, 1911
- Visitors: 99,652 (in 2025)
- Governing body: National Park Service
- Website: Devils Postpile National Monument

Devils Postpile National Monument is a U.S. national monument located near Mammoth Mountain in Eastern California. The monument protects Devils Postpile, an unusual rock formation of columnar basalt, "all closely and perfectly fitted together like a vast mosaic", and Rainbow Falls a waterfall on the Middle Fork of the San Joaquin River, which are also the two main attractions. The monument encompasses 798 acres (323 ha). In addition, the John Muir Trail and Pacific Crest Trail merge into one trail as they pass through the monument. Excluding a small developed area containing the monument headquarters, visitor center and a campground, the National Monument lies within the borders of the Ansel Adams Wilderness.

== History ==
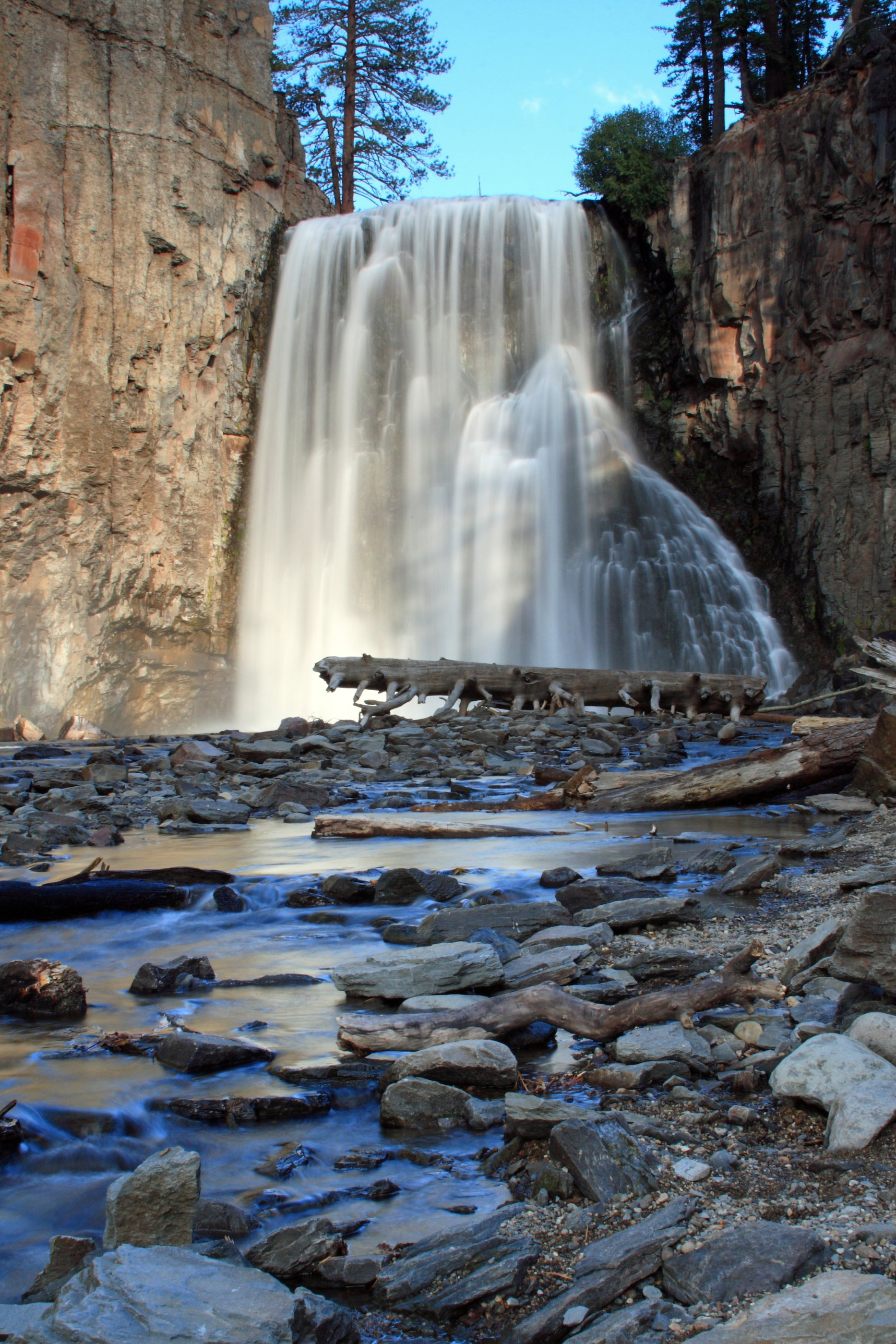
Rainbow Falls at Devils Postpile National Monument

The monument was established in 1911 as "Devil Postpile National Monument", (no possessive) but is widely referred to as Devils Postpile National Monument, and has been officially styled as plural without the apostrophe since the 1930s.

An alternate historic name was Devil's Woodpile. According to Historic Spots in California (1966), "In every scenic freak the sheep-herder recognizes the work of his Satanic majesty. This formation is therefore known to local fame as the Devil's Woodpile."

The monument was once part of Yosemite National Park, but discovery of gold in 1905 near Mammoth Lakes prompted a boundary change that left the Postpile on adjacent public land. Later, a proposal to build a hydroelectric dam called for blasting the Postpile into the river. Influential Californians, including John Muir, persuaded the federal government to stop the demolition and, in 1911, President William Howard Taft protected the area as a National Monument.

== Flora and fauna ==
The elevation of the national monument is between 7,200 and 8,200 ft (2,200 and 2,500 m), and the flora and fauna are typical of the western Sierra Nevada at these elevations. The monument area contains animals and plants such as black bears, pine martens, mule deer, coyotes, quaking aspen, black cottonwood, alder, and willows, Dark-eyed juncos and white-crowned sparrows are common in the summer.

Native wildflowers include:

- Crimson columbine (Aquilegia formosa)
- Giant red Indian paintbrush (Castilleja miniata)
- Pine forest larkspur (Delphinium gracilentum)
- Sierra shooting star (Dodecatheon jeffreyi)
- Wandering fleabane (Erigeron peregrinus)
- Shortleaf hulsea (Hulsea brevifolia)
- Sierra tiger lily (Lilium parvum)
- Large-leaved lupine (Lupinus polyphyllus)
- Common yellow monkeyflower (Mimulus guttatus)
- Parish's yampah (Perideridia parishii)
- Sticky cinquefoil (Potentilla glandulosa)
- Ranger's buttons (Angelica capitellata)
- California corn lily (Veratrum californicum)

== Access ==
The most common method for accessing Devils Postpile is via the mandatory shuttle bus operated by Eastern Sierra Transit Authority in the summer months at the price of $15 for an adult, followed by a 1/4 mile walk. The shuttle route begins at Mammoth Mountain Ski Area's Adventure Center and makes several stops throughout the valley and begins operating when the Reds Meadow Road opens in the summer, and continues through Labor Day weekend.

Devils Postpile is also accessible on foot from Mammoth Lakes by hiking over Mammoth Pass and into the Reds Meadow Valley. During the winter months, there are no services available, but adventurers can visit the site via cross-country ski or snowshoe.

Due to the Reds Meadow Road reconstruction project for the 2024 season, entry is limited to Friday starting at 9 AM, all day Saturday, and Sunday until 11 PM, this schedule until September 15, 2024. From then until the winter closure, it’s only open on Saturdays and Sundays from 9 AM to 7 PM, and there’s no shuttle. It’s closed on other days for reconstruction of the road to improve access and safety.

== Devils Postpile ==
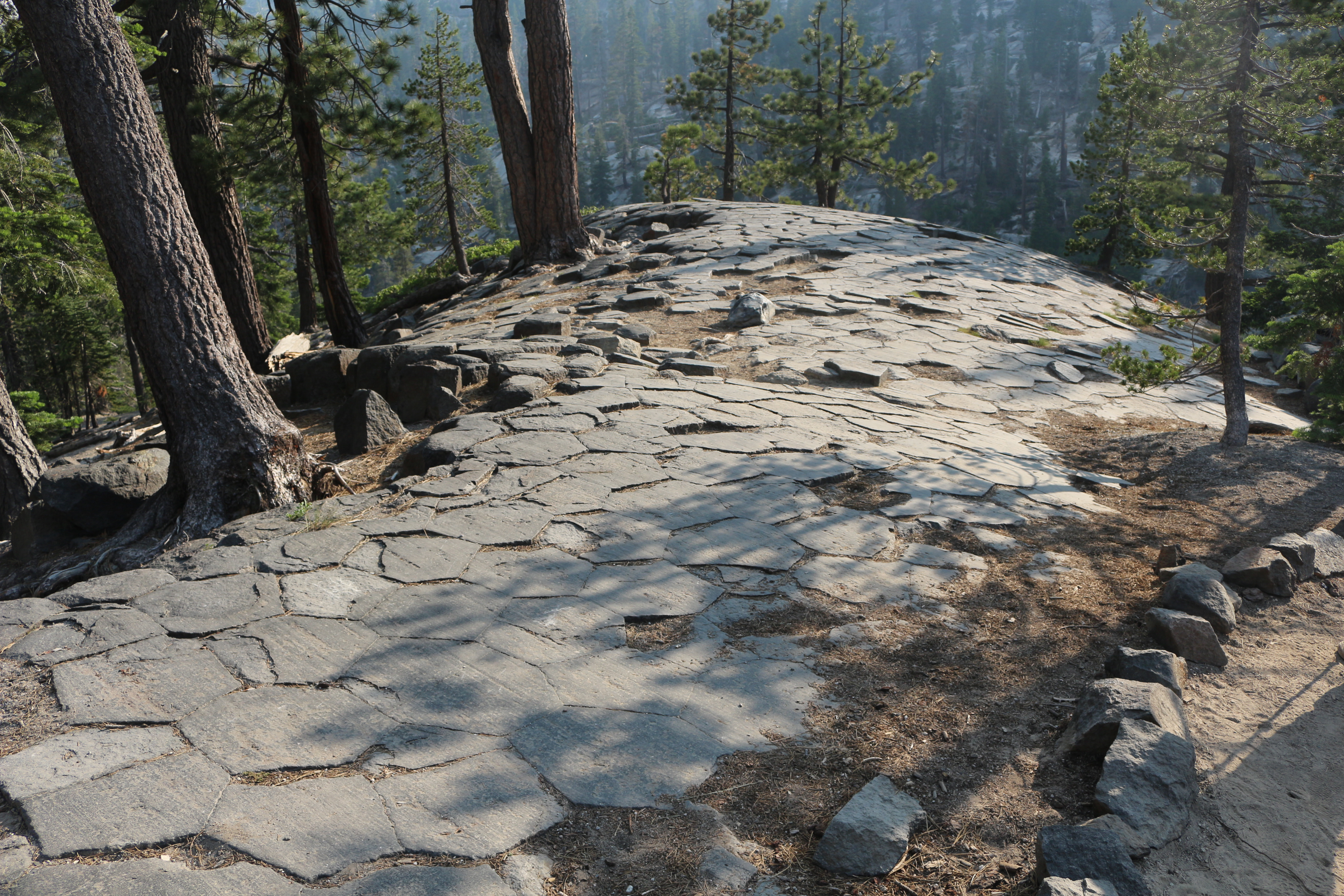
The tops of the postpile columns are accessible to visitors. The shapes of the column cross sections are seen clearly here.

The name "Devils Postpile" refers to a dark cliff of columnar basalt. Radiometric dating indicates the formation was created by a lava flow at some time less than 100,000 years ago. The source of the lava is thought to have been somewhere near Upper Soda Springs campground at the north end of Pumice Flat on the floor of the Middle Fork of the San Joaquin River, from where it flowed to the site of the Postpile. Estimates of the formation's thickness range from 400 feet (120 m) to 600 feet (180 m). The lava that now makes up the Postpile was near the bottom of this mass.

Because of its great thickness, much of the mass of pooled lava cooled slowly and evenly, which is why the columns are so long and so symmetrical. Columnar jointing occurs when certain types of lava contract while cooling.

A glacier later removed much of this mass of rock and left a polished surface on top of the columns with very noticeable glacial striations and glacial polish.

The Postpile's columns average 2 feet (0.61 m) in diameter ("The columns vary in size from ten to 30 inches in diameter."), the largest being 3.5 feet (1.1 m), and many are up to 60 feet (18 m) long.

Together they look like tall posts stacked in a pile, hence the feature's name. If the lava had cooled perfectly evenly, all of the columns would be expected to be hexagonal, but some of the columns have different polygonal cross-sections due to variations in cooling. A survey of 400 of the Postpile's columns found that 44.5% were 6-sided, 37.5% 5-sided, 9.5% 4-sided, 8.0% 7-sided, and 0.5% 3-sided. Compared with other examples of columnar jointing, the Postpile has more hexagonal columns. Another feature that places the Postpile in a special category is the lack of horizontal jointing.

=== Similar structures ===
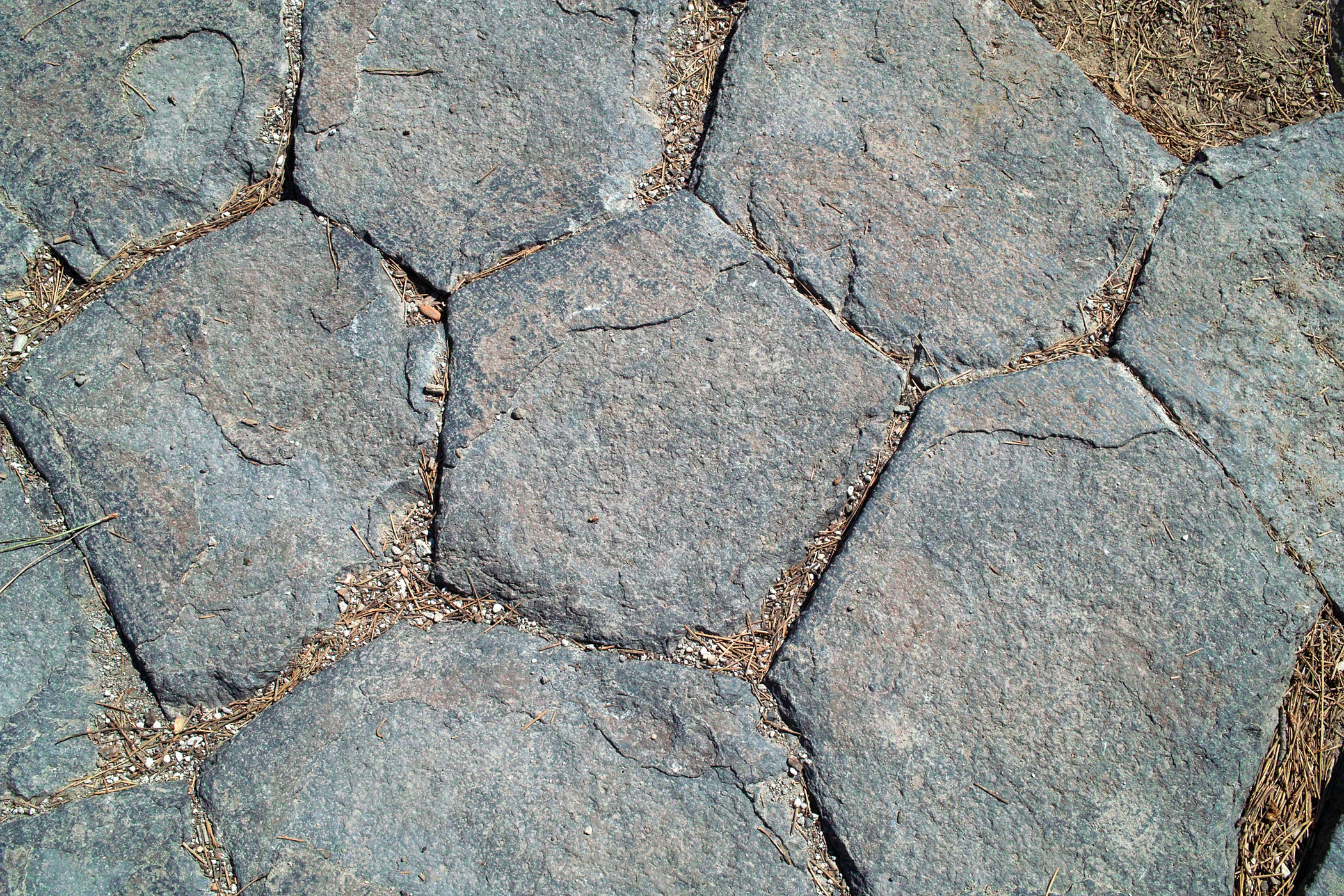
Top of columnar basalt showing polygonal shapes

Although the basaltic columns are impressive, they are not unique. Basalt columns are a common volcanic feature, and they occur on many scales (faster cooling produces smaller columns). Other notable sites include Svartifoss in Vatnajökull National Park in Iceland, Giant's Causeway in Northern Ireland, Fingal's Cave in Scotland, Titan's Piazza of the Mount Holyoke Range in Massachusetts, the Garni Gorge in Armenia, the Cyclopean Isles near Sicily, Sheepeater Cliff at Yellowstone National Park in Wyoming, Basaltic Prisms of Santa María Regla in Huasca de Ocampo, Mexico, the Organ Pipes formation on Mount Cargill in New Zealand, Gilbert Hill in Mumbai, Organ Pipes National Park in Australia and the Column Cape (Russian: Mis Stolbchaty) on Kunashir Island, the southernmost of the Kuril Islands, Cerro Colorado and Mar Brava (Ancud) in Chile. Columnar basalt can also be seen in a high desert dry river falls area just north of Lajitas, Texas. The much more massive Devils Tower National Monument in Wyoming is superficially similar but consists of a phonolite porphyry, formed by the intrusion of igneous rock.

== See also ==
- Ansel Adams Wilderness
- Devils Postpile National Monument Ranger Cabin
- Gilbert Hill
- List of national monuments of the United States
- Little Devils Postpile
- Protected areas of the Sierra Nevada

== Bibliography ==
- Roadside Geology of Northern and Central California, Alt, Hyndman (Mountain Press Publishing Company, Missoula; 2000) ISBN 0-87842-409-1
