= Klamath Mountains =

Mountain range in Oregon and California, United States

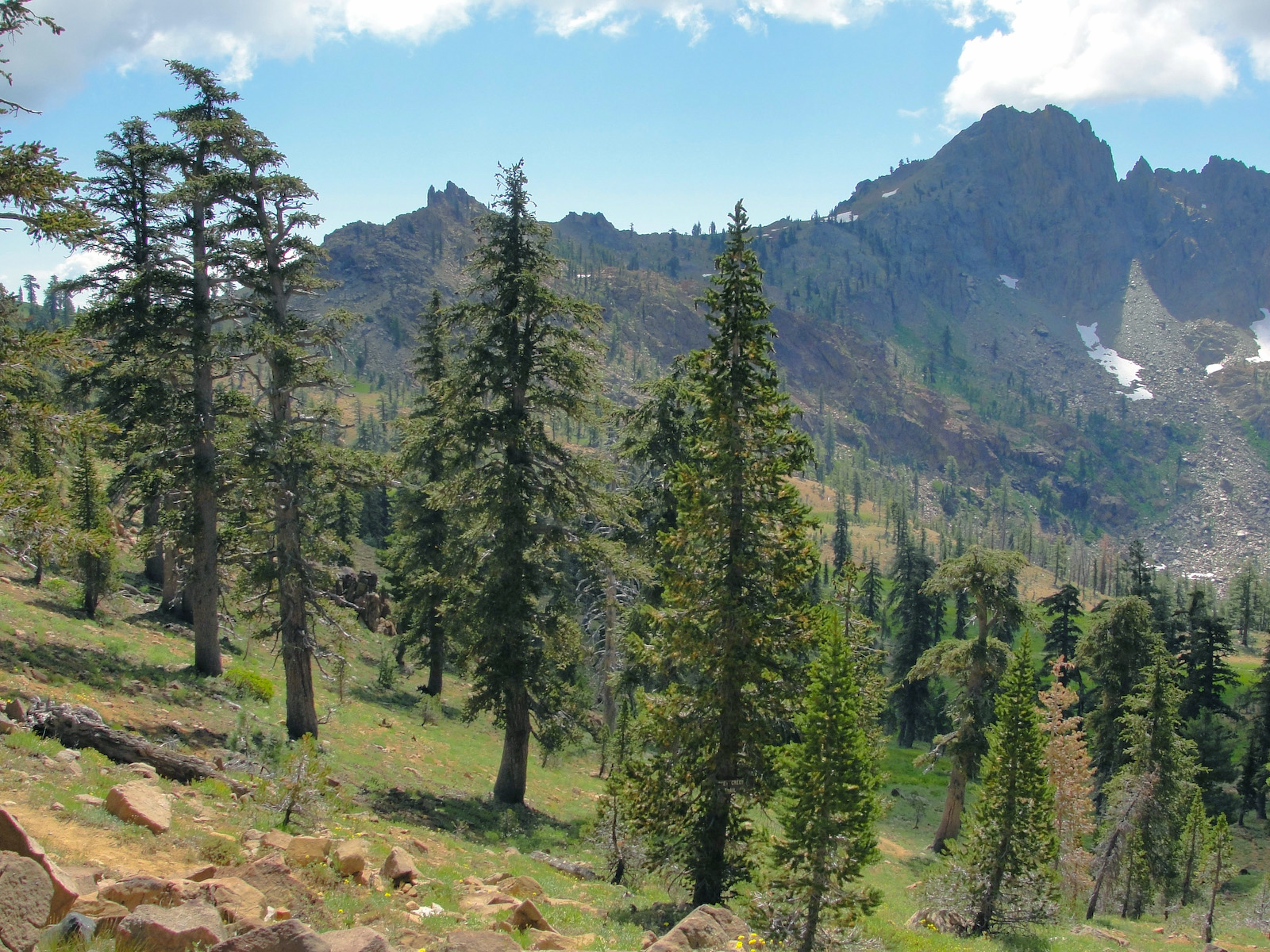
- Mixed conifer forest in the Trinity Alps

Highest point
- Peak: Mount Eddy
- Elevation: 9,025 ft (2,751 m)
- Listing: Mountains of Oregon; Mountains of California

Dimensions
- Length: 249 km (155 mi)
- Width: 181 km (112 mi)
- Area: 25,595 km^{2} (9,882 mi^{2})

Geography
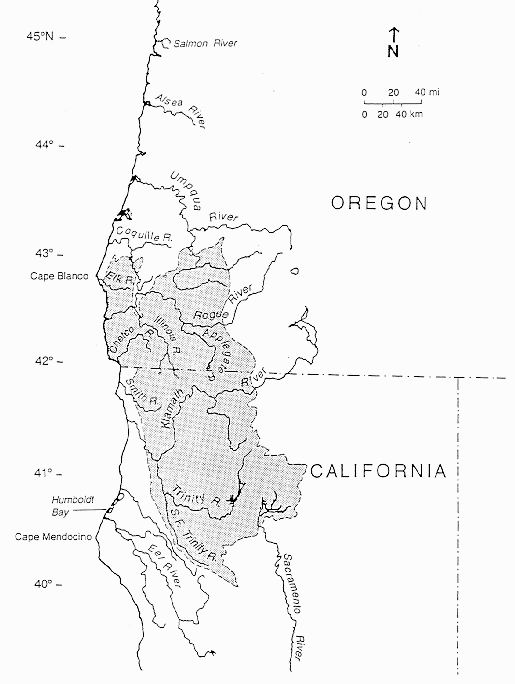
- Map of the Klamath Mountains Geologic Province, Pacific Coast Ranges
- Country: United States
- States: Oregon; California
- Range coordinates: 41°19′12″N 122°28′44″W
- Parent range: Pacific Coast Ranges

The Klamath Mountains are a rugged and lightly populated mountain range in northwestern California and southwestern Oregon in the western United States. As a mountain system within both the greater Pacific Coast Ranges and the California Coast Ranges, the Klamath Mountains have a varied geology, with substantial areas of serpentinite and marble, and a climate characterized by moderately cold winters with very heavy snowfall and warm, very dry summers with limited rainfall, especially in the south. As a consequence of the geology and soil types, the mountains harbor several endemic or near-endemic trees, forming one of the largest collections of conifers in the world. The mountains are also home to a diverse array of fish and animal species, including black bears, large cats, owls, eagles, and several species of Pacific salmon. Millions of acres in the mountains are managed by the United States Forest Service. The northernmost and largest sub-range of the Klamath Mountains are the Siskiyou Mountains.

== Geography ==
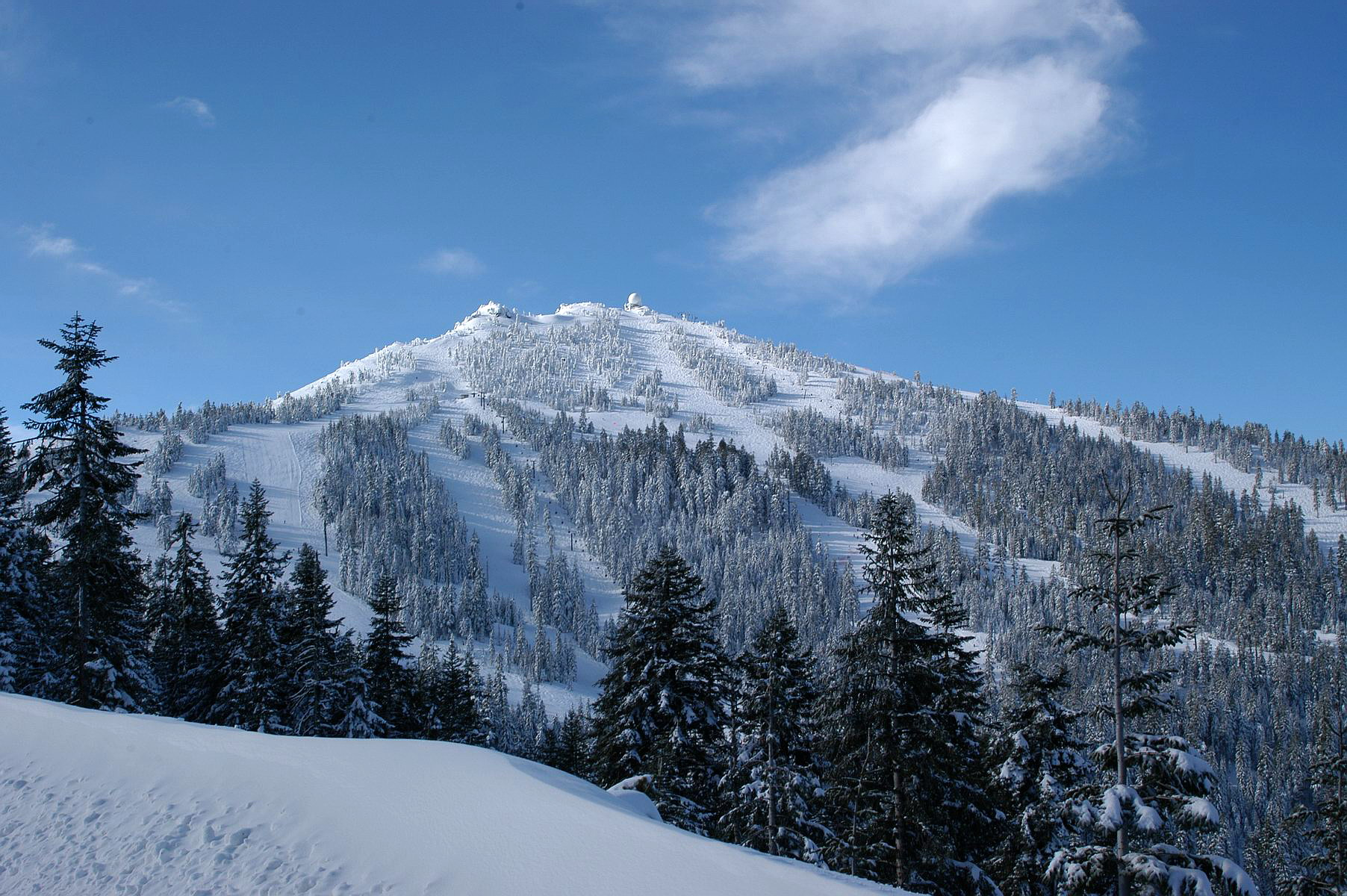
Mount Ashland, the highest point of the Siskiyou Mountains

Physiographically, the Klamath Mountains include the Siskiyou Mountains, the Marble Mountains, the Scott Mountains, the Trinity Mountains, the Trinity Alps, the Salmon Mountains, and the northern Yolla-Bolly Mountains. They are a section of the larger Pacific Border province, which in turn is part of the Pacific Mountain System (Pacific Coast Ranges) physiographic division. Klamath Mountains is the name given to one of California's eleven geomorphic provinces.

=== Ten highest peaks ===
These are the ten highest points in the Klamath Mountains:

1. Mount Eddy (Trinity County and Siskiyou County, California; 9,029 feet (2,752 m))
2. Thompson Peak (Trinity and Siskiyou County, California; 9,002 feet (2,744 m))
3. Mount Hilton (Trinity and Siskiyou County, California; 8,934 feet (2,723 m))
4. Caesar Peak (Trinity and Siskiyou County, California; 8,920 feet (2,720 m))
5. Sawtooth Mountain (Trinity County, California; 8,891 feet (2,710 m))
6. Wedding Cake Mountain (Trinity County, California; 8,570 feet (2,610 m))
7. Caribou Mountain (Siskiyou County, California; 8,564 feet (2,610 m))
8. China Mountain (Siskiyou County, California; 8,551 feet (2,606 m))
9. Gibson Peak (Trinity County, California; 8,403 feet (2,561 m))
10. Boulder Peak (Siskiyou County, California; 8,299 feet (2,530 m))

=== Protected areas ===
A large portion of the Klamath Mountains is managed by the United States Forest Service. Several national forests lie in the Klamath Mountains region, including the Shasta-Trinity National Forest, Siskiyou National Forest, Klamath National Forest, Six Rivers National Forest, and Mendocino National Forest.

The Klamath Mountains contain 11 wilderness areas in both Oregon and California:

- Chanchelulla Wilderness
- Kalmiopsis Wilderness
- Marble Mountain Wilderness
- Mount Lassic Wilderness
- North Fork Wilderness
- Red Buttes Wilderness
- Russian Wilderness
- Siskiyou Wilderness
- Soda Mountain Wilderness
- Trinity Alps Wilderness
- Yolla Bolly-Middle Eel Wilderness

== Recreation ==
There are extensive hiking trail systems, recreation areas, and campgrounds both primitive and developed in the Klamaths. A 211-mile (340 km) stretch of the Pacific Crest Trail (PCT) passes through these mountains as well. This section of the PCT is known locally as "The Big Bend" and is the transition from the California Floristic Province to the Cascades.

The Bigfoot Trail is a 400-mile (640 km) trail through the Klamath Mountains from the Yolla Bolly-Middle Eel Wilderness to Crescent City, California.

== Geology ==
The rocks of the Klamath Mountains originated as island arcs and continental fragments in the Pacific Ocean. The island masses consisted of rifted fragments of pre-existing continents and volcanic island masses created over subduction zones. These island masses contain rocks as old as 500 million years, dating to the early Paleozoic Era. A succession of eight island terranes moved eastward on the ancient Farallon Plate and collided with the North American Plate between 260 and about 130 million years ago. Each accretion left a terrane of rock of a single age. During the accretion, subduction of the plate metamorphosed the overlying rock and produced magma which intruded the overlying rock as plutons. Serpentinite, produced by the metamorphism of basaltic oceanic rocks, and intrusive rocks of gabbroic to granodiorite composition are common rocks within the Klamath terranes.

Subsequent lava flows from active volcanoes in the Cascade Range and the erosion of the Oregon Coast Range to the north partially covered these rocks with basalt and sediments.

== Ecology ==
=== Flora ===
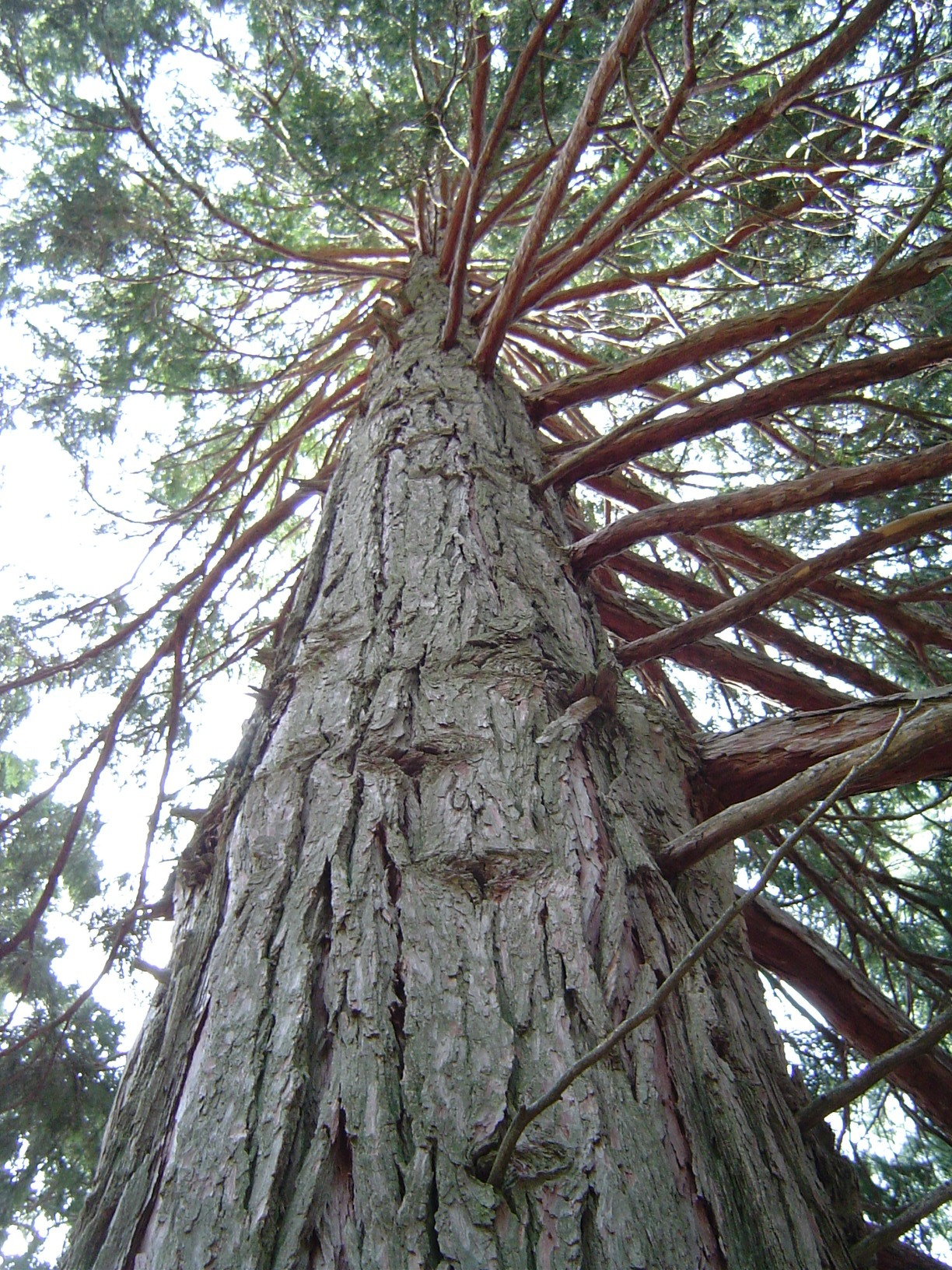
California incense-cedar (Calocedrus decurrens)

As a consequence of the geology, the mountains harbor rich biodiversity, with several distinct plant communities, including temperate rain forests, moist inland forests, oak forests and savannas, high elevation forests, and alpine grasslands. These communities form the Klamath Mountains ecoregion. One of the principal plant communities in the Klamath Mountains is Mediterranean California Lower Montane Black Oak-Conifer Forest.

The ecoregion includes several endemic or near-endemic species, such as Port Orford cedar or Lawson's cypress (Chamaecyparis lawsoniana), foxtail pine (Pinus balfouriana spp. balfouriana), and Brewer's spruce (Picea breweriana), forming one of the largest collections of different conifers in the world. The flowering plant Kalmiopsis leachiana, also endemic to the Klamaths, is limited to the Siskiyou sub-range in Oregon.

Conifers

A large concentration of diverse coniferous species of trees exists in these mountains. Thirty conifer species (or more, depending on where one delineates the region) inhabit the area, including two endemic species, the Brewer's spruce and the Port Orford cedar, making the Klamath Mountains one of the richest coniferous forest regions of the world in terms of concentrated species diversity. The region also has several edaphic plant communities, adapted to specific soil types, notably serpentine outcrops.

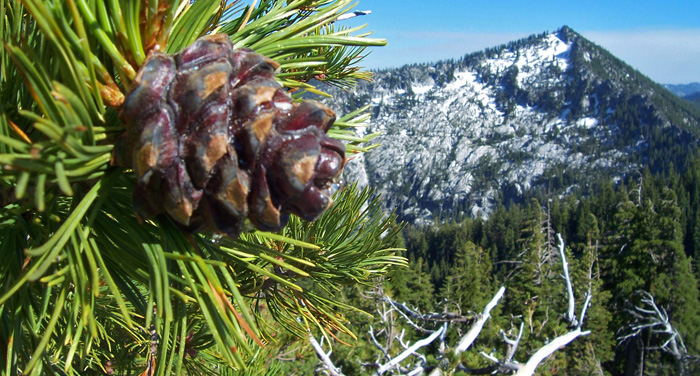
Russian Peak and whitebark pine

In 1969, Drs. John O. Sawyer and Dale Thornburgh discovered 17 species of conifers in 1 square mile (2.6 km^{2}) around Little Duck Lake and Sugar Creek in the Russian Wilderness. They called this diverse area the Miracle Mile. In 2013 Richard Moore identified an 18th species, western juniper, in the Sugar Creek canyon. This is now considered the richest assemblage of conifers per unit area in any temperate region on Earth.

Conifer species in the Klamath Mountains include coast Douglas-fir (Pseudotsuga menziesii ssp. menziesii), Port Orford cedar, ponderosa pine (Pinus ponderosa), sugar pine (Pinus lambertiana), mountain hemlock (Tsuga mertensiana), western hemlock, white fir (Abies concolor var. lowiana), red fir (A. magnifica var. shastensis), Brewer spruce, coast redwood (Sequoia sempervirens), western red cedar (Thuja Plicata),Pacific yew (Taxus brevifolia),Western White Pine, Lodgepole Pine, Whitebark Pine, Incense Cedar, Foothill Pine, Foxtail Pine, western Juniper, common juniper, subalpine fir, grand fir, sitka spruce, Shasta fir, knobcone pine, Engelmann spruce, Noble fir, Bishop Pine, Baker cypress, yellow cedar, shore pine and Jeffrey Pine. The Westernmost stand of Quaking Aspen trees is located in the northern portion of the Yolla Bolly-Middle Eel Wilderness .

Trinity Alps flora

Typical species of the Trinity Alps region include Douglas fir, ponderosa pine, red fir, white fir, black oak, canyon live oak, Pacific madrone, bigleaf maple, California Buckeye, incense cedar, and Jeffrey pine. California's northernmost stand of gray pine (Pinus sabiniana) is found here along the South Fork of the Salmon River.

=== Fauna ===
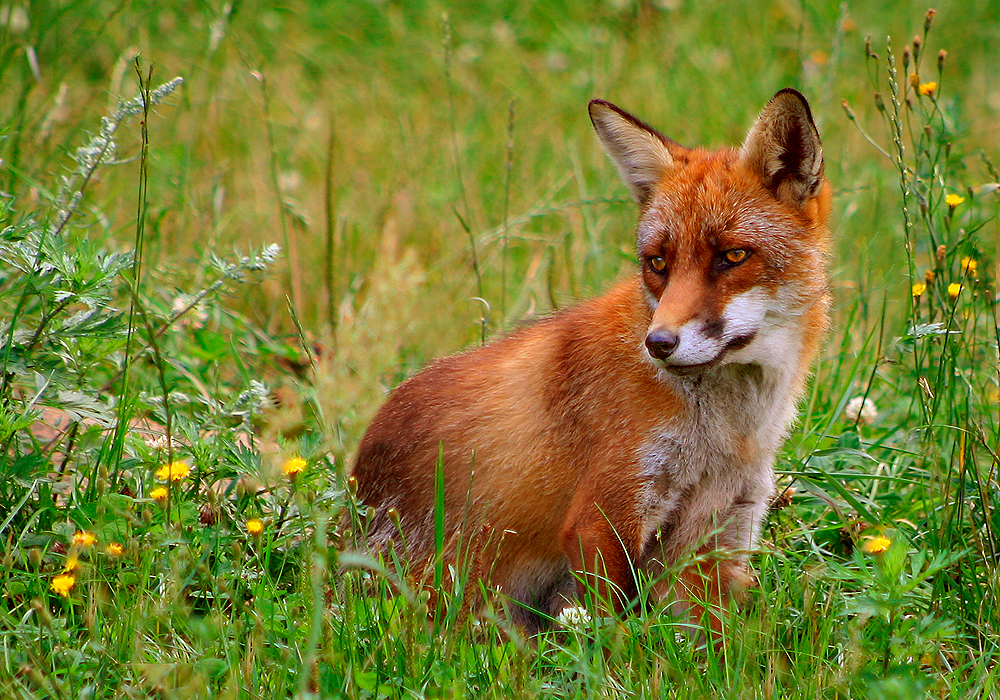
Red fox (Vulpes vulpes)

The vast forested wildlands, coupled with a low rate of human settlement in the rugged remote terrain, provides excellent habitat for a number of species. Mammal species include mountain lions, black bears, bobcats, lynx, raccoons, martens, fishers, beavers, grey fox, red fox, northern flying squirrel, and plentiful black-tailed deer. Bird species include golden eagles, bald eagles, pileated woodpecker, Flicker woodpecker, band-tailed pigeon, several hawks including goshawks, Red-tailed hawks several large owl species including the spotted owl, plus an extensive variety of additional species both plant and animal.

Grizzly bears, gray wolves, and mule deer once inhabited the area, but were extirpated by European settlers. A project to reintroduce Roosevelt elk began in 1985 in the western Marble Mountains, near Elk Creek. Over the next 10 years the number and placement of reintroduced animals was expanded, and now elk can be seen roaming throughout the Marble Mountain Wilderness, Trinity Alps Wilderness, in the northern Siskiyou Mountains, along the South Fork of the Salmon River, and in small numbers near Trinity Lake and Reading Creek.

Some of the most remote areas are the location of supposed Bigfoot/Sasquatch sightings from time to time, and the legendary creature plays a part in the folk tales of the Native American populations.

=== Rivers and fish ===
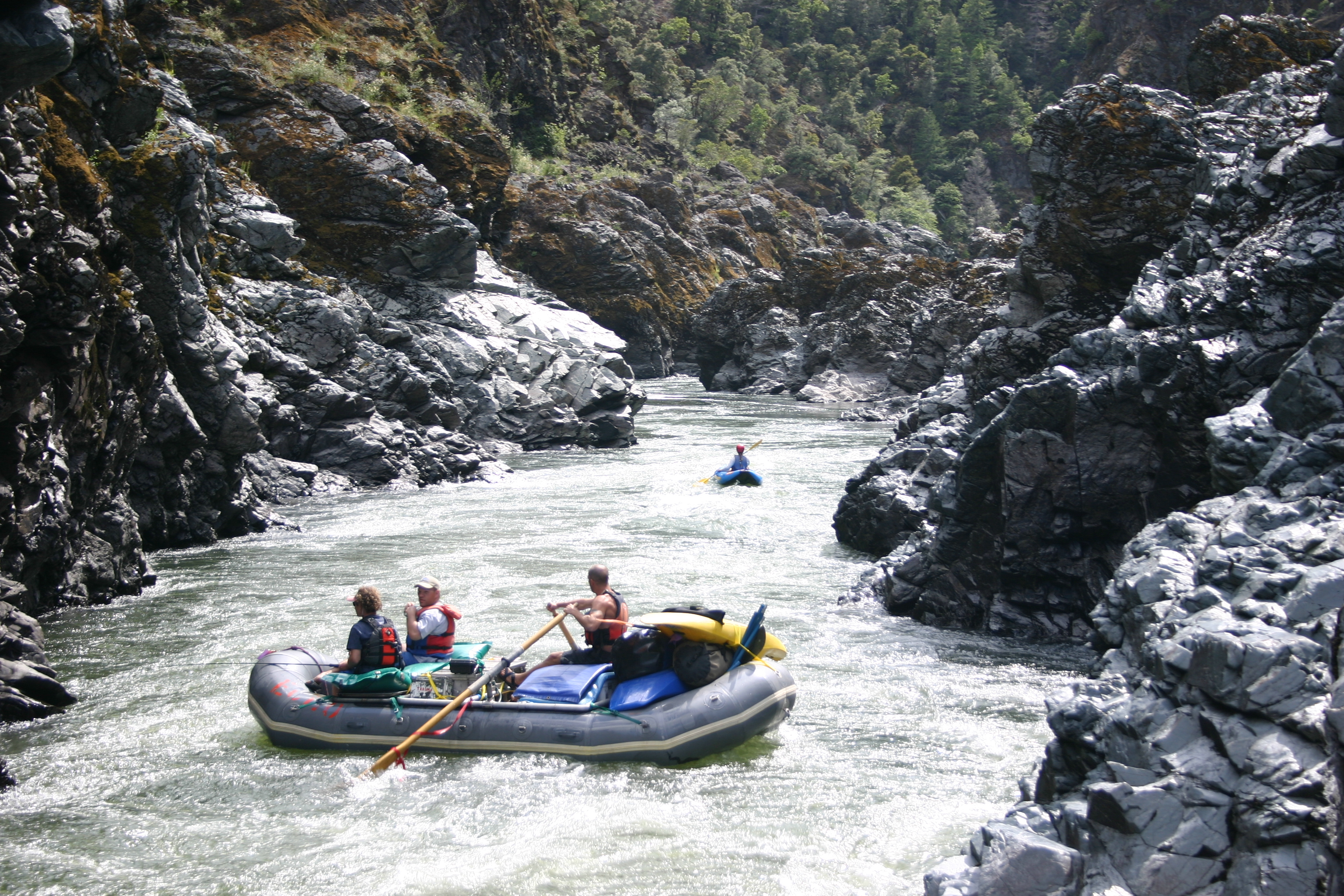
Rafters on the Rogue River in the northern Klamath Mountains in southwestern Oregon

Major rivers and lakes in the Klamath Mountains include the Klamath River, Trinity River, Smith River, Salmon River, Rogue River, Scott River, upper Sacramento River, Chetco River, Mad River, Van Duzen River, Applegate River, Illinois River, Elk River, South Umpqua River, South Fork Coquille River, Shasta Lake, Trinity Lake, Ruth Lake, Castle Lake, Applegate Lake, and Whiskeytown Lake.

The many mountains, streams and rivers form a major spawning ground for several species of trout and salmon; yet recently, in the last 50 years, some of the fish stocks have fallen drastically, particularly salmon stocks. The ecoregion's rivers and streams are home to nine species of native salmonids. The depletions occur mainly due to construction of dams and clearcutting of forests on the rugged slopes of the area contribute to large amounts of silt in the stream beds, which in turn interfere with spawning salmon, as they lay their eggs in exposed gravel beds. The notable fish species are king, kokanee, and silver salmon, brown, brook, and rainbow trout (including steelhead), cutthroat trout, and crappie, bluegill, catfish, and largemouth and smallmouth bass.

== See also ==
- The Klamath Knot

== Works cited ==
- Axelrod, Daniel I. (January 1985). Miocene Floras from the Middlegate Basin, West-Central Nevada. University of California Publications in Geological Sciences. Vol. 129. Berkeley, CA: University of California Press. ISBN 9780520096950. OCLC 10532850.
- Benke, Arthur C., ed., and Cushing, Colbert E., ed.; Stanford, Jack A.; Gregory, Stanley V.; Hauer, Richard F.; Snyder, Eric B. (2005). Rivers of North America. Burlington, MA: Elsevier Academic Press. ISBN 0-12-088253-1. OCLC 59003378.
- Bishop, Ellen Morris (2004). Hiking Oregon's Geology (2nd ed.). Seattle, WA: Mountaineers Books. ISBN 9780898868470. OCLC 53887464.
- Briles, Christy E.; Whitlock, Cathy; Skinner, Carl N.; Mohr, Jerry (2011). "Holocene forest development and maintenance on different substrates in the Klamath Mountains, northern California, USA" (PDF). Ecology. 92 (3). Ecological Society of America: 590–601. doi:10.1890/09-1772.1. hdl:1969.1/182773. PMID 21608468. Archived from the original (PDF) on January 20, 2022.
- Lewon, Dennis (2001). Hiking California's Trinity Alps Wilderness. Helena, MT: Falcon. ISBN 9781560447139. OCLC 47039653.
- Kauffmann, Michael (2012). Conifer Country (1st ed.). Kneeland, CA: Backcountry Press. ISBN 9780578094168. OCLC 798852130.
- Sawyer, John O. (2004). "Conifers of the Klamath Mountains". Vegetation Ecology, Proceedings of the second conference on Klamath-Siskiyou ecology. Cave Junction, OR: Siskiyou Field Institute.
- Sawyer, John O. (2006). Northwest California: A Natural History. Berkeley, CA: University of California Press. ISBN 9780520928367. OCLC 76812956.
- Skinner, C.N.; Taylor, A.H.; Agee, J.K. (2006). "Klamath Mountains bioregion". In Sugihara, N.G.; van Wagtendonk, J.W.; Fites-Kaufman, J.; Shaffer, K.E; Thode, A.E. (eds.). Fire in California's Ecosystems. Berkeley, CA: University of California Press. ISBN 9780520932272. OCLC 86110764.
- Strothmann, R.O.; Roy, Douglass F. (December 1984). "Regeneration of Douglas-fir in the Klamath Mountains Region, California and Oregon" (PDF). U.S. Forest Service.
- White, Mike (2010). Trinity Alps and Vicinity: Including Whiskeytown, Russian Wilderness, and Castle Crags Areas (5th ed.). Berkeley, CA: Wilderness Press. ISBN 9780899975016. OCLC 351330287.
- Wuerthner, George (1997). California's Wilderness Areas. Englewood, CO: Westcliffe Publishers. ISBN 9781565792333. OCLC 39698847.
