= Russian Peak =

Mountain in the state of California

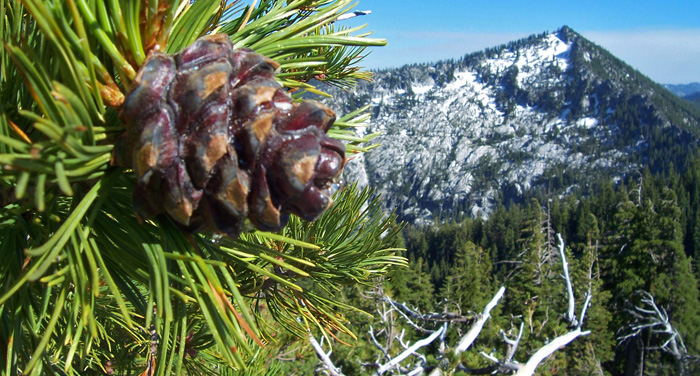
- Whitebark pine and Russian Peak

Highest point
- Elevation: 8,199 ft (2,499 m) NAVD 88
- Prominence: 2,230 ft (680 m)
- Coordinates: 41°16′57″N 122°57′06″W

Geography
- Location: Russian Wilderness; Siskiyou County, California, U.S.
- Parent range: Klamath Mountains
- Topo map: USGS Eaton Peak

Russian Peak is part of a sub-range of the Klamath Mountains, California, called the Salmon Mountains—a horseshoe-shaped range encompassing the headwaters of the Salmon River. The mountain itself is part of the granitic Russian Peak batholith. This peak is also the highest peak in the Russian Wilderness—12,700 acres (51 km^{2}) of subalpine lakes and botanical wonders.

The peak gained prominence amongst botanists in the 1970s when Dale Thornburgh and John Sawyer began conducting studies in its drainages. In addition to discovering the first stands of subalpine fir in California, the diversity of other conifers they found here was reason for pause and then return studies. In all, after several years of research, they discovered 17 species of conifers in one square mile—of varied terrain—below the peak. Those conifers are: foxtail pine, whitebark pine, western white pine, Jeffrey pine, ponderosa pine, lodgepole pine, sugar pine, white fir, Shasta fir, subalpine fir, Engelmann spruce, Brewer spruce, mountain hemlock, Douglas-fir, incense-cedar, common juniper, and Pacific yew. An 18th conifer, the western juniper, was documented and reported by Richard Moore in 2013.

Sawyer and Thornburgh coined the term Enriched Stands of the Klamath Mountains to define the phenomenon here, and a few other place in the Klamath Mountains, where high diversity and rare associations of conifers exists. They went on to suggest that these complex vegetation associations are due to reduced biological interactions—or simply minimal competition between species. In addition to being part of the Western Pacific Cordillera, connecting it with the Cascade Range and Sierra Nevada (U.S.) and allowing for migrations over time, the area has varied climate, nutrient rich and poor soils, and sporadic disturbance, like fires. The interaction of these factors ultimately reduces competition between these species allowing such diversity in a small area. This is a formula for not only conifer diversity but other plant diversity as well. Eventually this duo, helped by their students from Humboldt State University, identified over 400 species of vascular plants around the peak.
