= Russian Wilderness =

Protected wilderness area in California, United States

- IUCN category Ib (wilderness area)

- Location within the United States
- Location: Klamath National Forest, Siskiyou County, California
- Nearest city: Eureka, California
- Coordinates: 41°18′30″N 122°56′28″W
- Area: 12,700 acres (51 km^{2})
- Governing body: United States Forest Service / United States Department of Agriculture

The Russian Wilderness is a wilderness area of 12,000 acres (49 km^{2}) located approximately 65 miles (105 km) northeast of Eureka in northern California. It is within the Klamath National Forest in Siskiyou County and is managed by the US Forest Service. It was added to the National Wilderness Preservation System when the US Congress passed the California Wilderness Act of 1984.

The Russian Wilderness protects the Russian Mountains, a portion of the high crest of the Salmon Mountains, which are composed of metamorphic and granitic rock. There are over twenty named lakes at different elevation levels as well as the major watersheds of the Scott River and North Fork Salmon River.

The Russian is one of three wilderness areas that form an almost continuous chain, from the Trinity Alps Wilderness to the south, and the Marble Mountain Wilderness in the north, these areas provide an important corridor for wildlife such as the migrating herds of black-tailed deer. The Russian Wilderness is part of the largest nearly roadless complex in northwestern California.

Elevations range from 2,500 feet (760 m) to the high point of the wilderness, Russian Peak, at 8,196 feet (2,498 m) [41°17′N 122°57′W].

== Flora and fauna ==
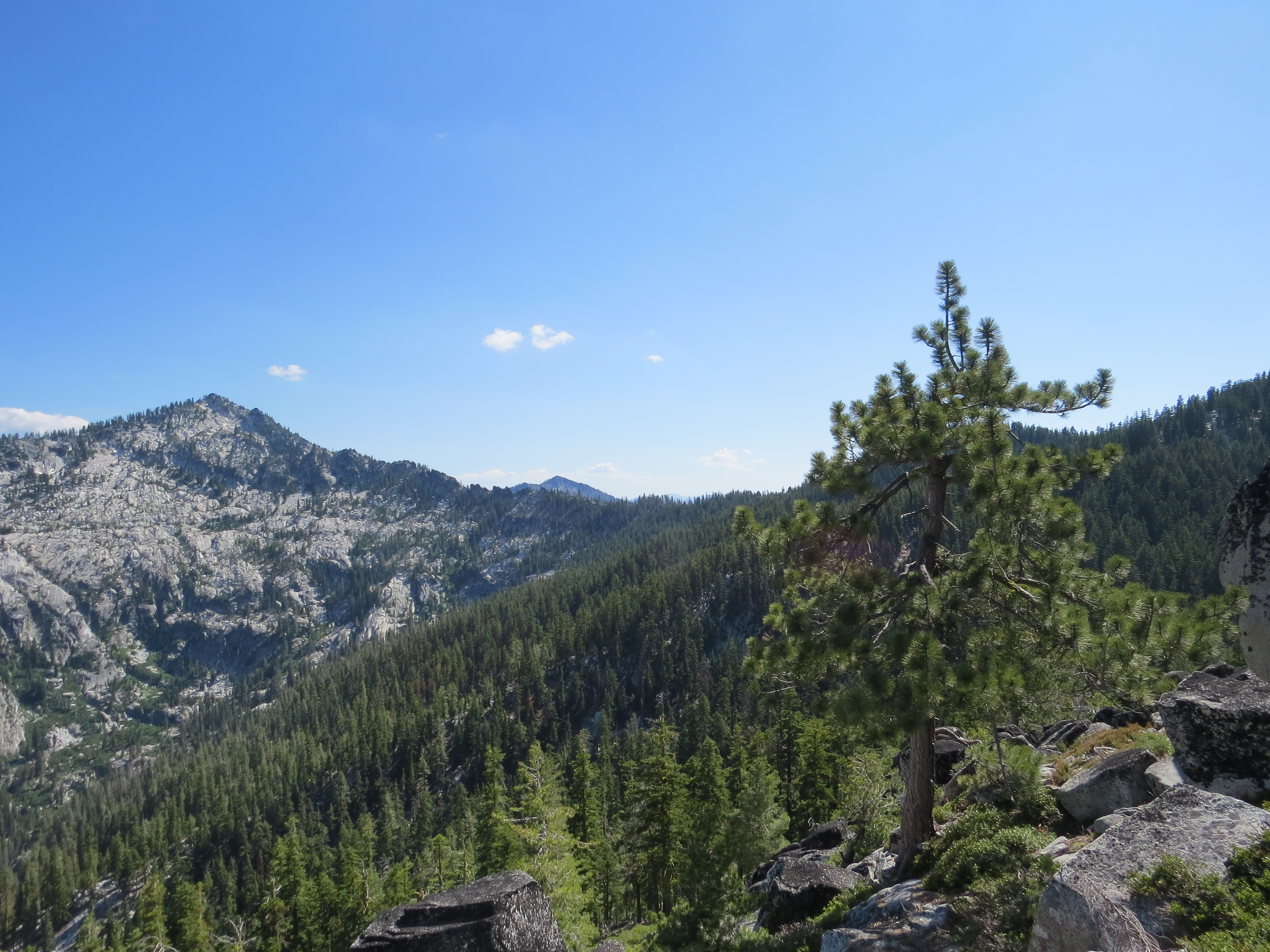
Jeffrey Pine in the Russian Wilderness with Russian Peak in the background

There are several stands of conifers that are rare for California, including subalpine fir and Engelmann spruce in the wilderness. The region gained prominence amongst botanists in the 1970s when Dale Thornburgh and John Sawyer began conducting studies in Sugar Creek. In addition to discovering the first stands of subalpine fir in California, the diversity of other conifers they found here was reason for pause and then return studies. In all, after several years of research, they discovered 17 species of conifers in one square mile—of varied terrain—below the peak. Those conifers are: foxtail pine, whitebark pine, western white pine, Jeffrey pine, ponderosa pine, lodgepole pine, sugar pine, white fir, Shasta fir, subalpine fir, Engelmann spruce, Brewer spruce, mountain hemlock, Douglas-fir, incense-cedar, common juniper, and Pacific yew. An 18th conifer, the western juniper, was documented and reported by Richard Moore in 2013.

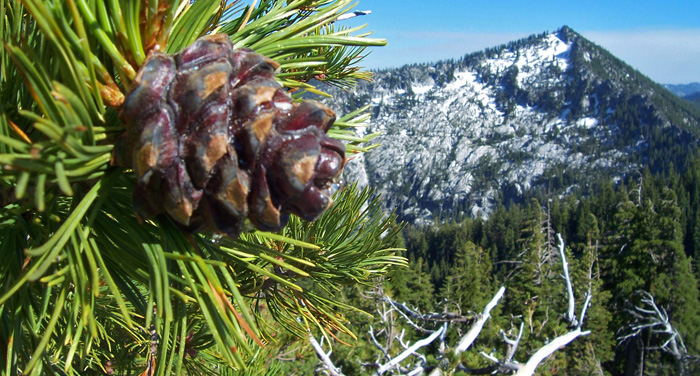
Russian Peak and whitebark pine

Rare perennials include the Siskiyou fireweed (Epilobium siskiyouense), and several types of lousewort (Pedicularis). The rare annual Siskiyou phacelia ( Phacelia leonis), was observed by John O. Sawyer and J. Smith in 1988. Siskiyou phacelia has bell-shaped blue-purple flowers, blooms in summer, and grows in serpentine soils.

The wilderness protects habitats for American black bears, deer, Douglas squirrels, California quail and rattlesnakes. Less common animals include the fishers, American martens, wolverines, northern pileated woodpeckers, North American beavers, California valley coyotes and North American cougars. Rainbow trout, eastern brook trout and brown trout are found in the lakes and streams.

== Geology ==
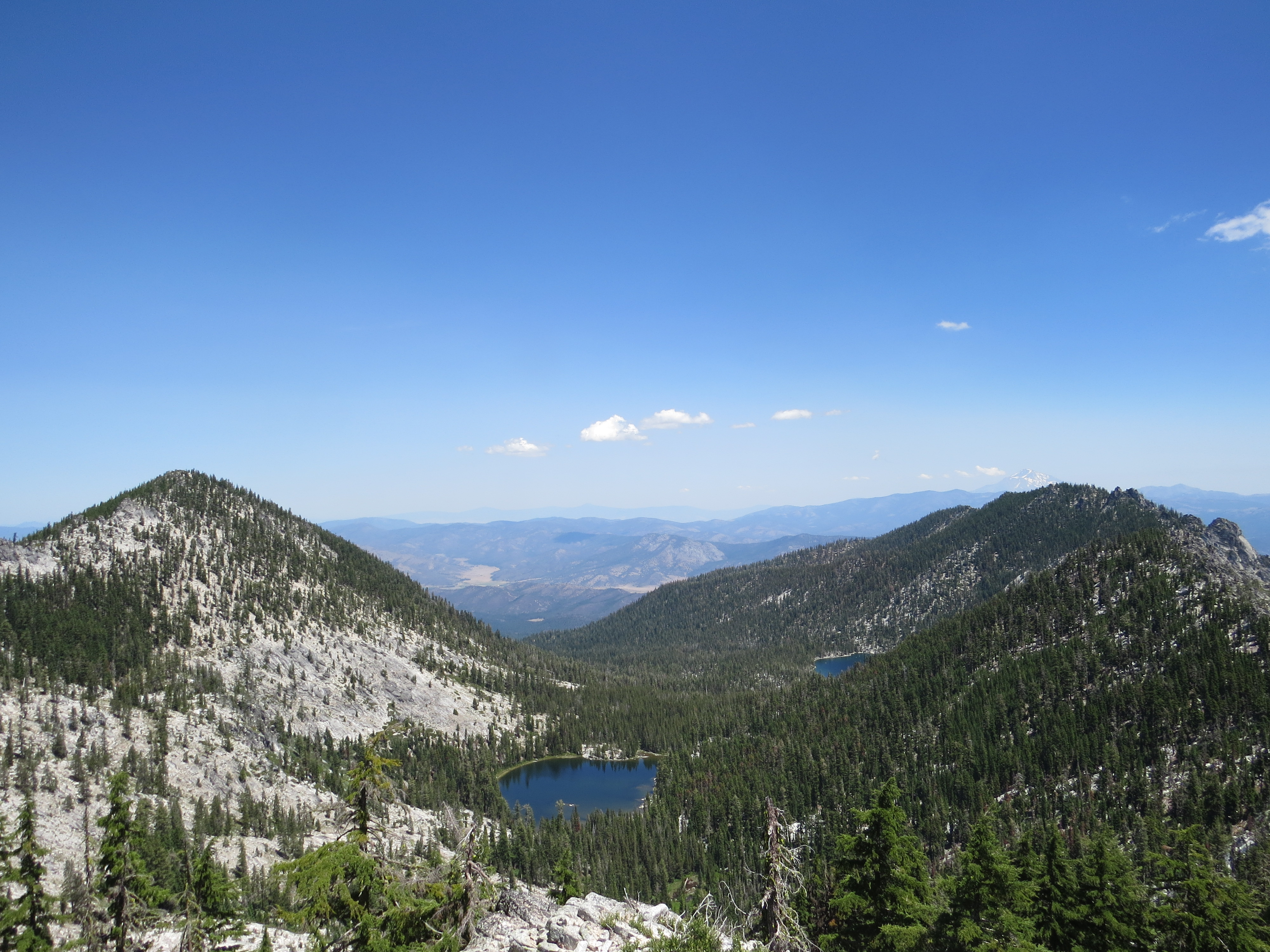
Glacially carved valley in the Russian Wilderness showing the characteristic white granite and "U" shape

The wilderness is dominated by glacier-carved granite crags, dating from the Mesozoic, similar to the Sierra Nevada. This results in similar surface topography, including cirques and U-shaped glacial valleys. Similar to the Ritter Range, a chain of dark metavolcanic rock is dominant in the mountains along the edge of the wilderness.

== Recreation ==
The Pacific Crest Trail travels 18.5 miles (29.8 km) along the Salmon Mountain crest. The Bigfoot Trail passes through the wilderness for 5 miles (8.0 km) where it crosses the Salmon Mountain crest, from Syphon Lake to Russian Creek. Because of the small size of the wilderness, visitors can reach the highlights in less than two hours of hiking or horseback riding. Ski and snowshoe trips are possible with four cirque (glacial lake) basins providing good telemark skiing. Major drainages are the North Fork Salmon and Scott rivers and have populations of rainbow trout and steelhead.

== Roadless areas ==
There are three separate units totaling 16,800 acres (68 km^{2}) adjacent to the wilderness. These roadless areas have stands of old growth forests of oak and madrone growing in a terrain of glacially modified landscape, with U-shaped valleys and granite crags.
