= Bigfoot Trail =

Long-distance hiking trail in the United States

- The Bigfoot Trail passes Russian Lake in the Russian Wilderness
- Length: approx 360 miles (600 km)
- Location: Klamath Mountains, California, United States
- Use: Hiking
- Difficulty: Strenuous

The Bigfoot Trail is an unofficial U.S. long-distance hiking trail in northern California. The Bigfoot Trail was originally proposed by Michael Kauffmann in 2009 as a suggested route to navigate the Klamath Mountains from south to north as well as a long-trail to introduce nature lovers to the biodiversity of the Klamath Mountains region. The trail begins in the Yolla Bolly-Middle Eel Wilderness and ends in Redwood National Park at the Pacific Ocean near Crescent City, California. A major focus along the trail is conifer diversity, passing 32 species in 360 miles (580 km). The route crosses six wilderness areas, one National Park, and one State Park. Northwest California's Klamath Mountains foster one of the most diverse temperate coniferous forests on Earth, and this route is intended to be a celebration of that biodiversity.

== Route ==
Of the 360 miles, approximately 100 miles (160 km) are along seldom used Forest Service roads while the remaining segments are backcountry trails, either in wilderness or on National Forest land. The Pacific Crest Trail briefly coincides with the Bigfoot Trail in the northern Marble Mountain Wilderness and north of Seiad Valley to the edge of the Red Buttes Wilderness. Due to the strenuous nature of the trail and the fact that some sections have been un-maintained for many years it is not a trail that can be hiked quickly. Experience using map and compass as well as the ability to read the landscape are necessary for a successful thru-hike.

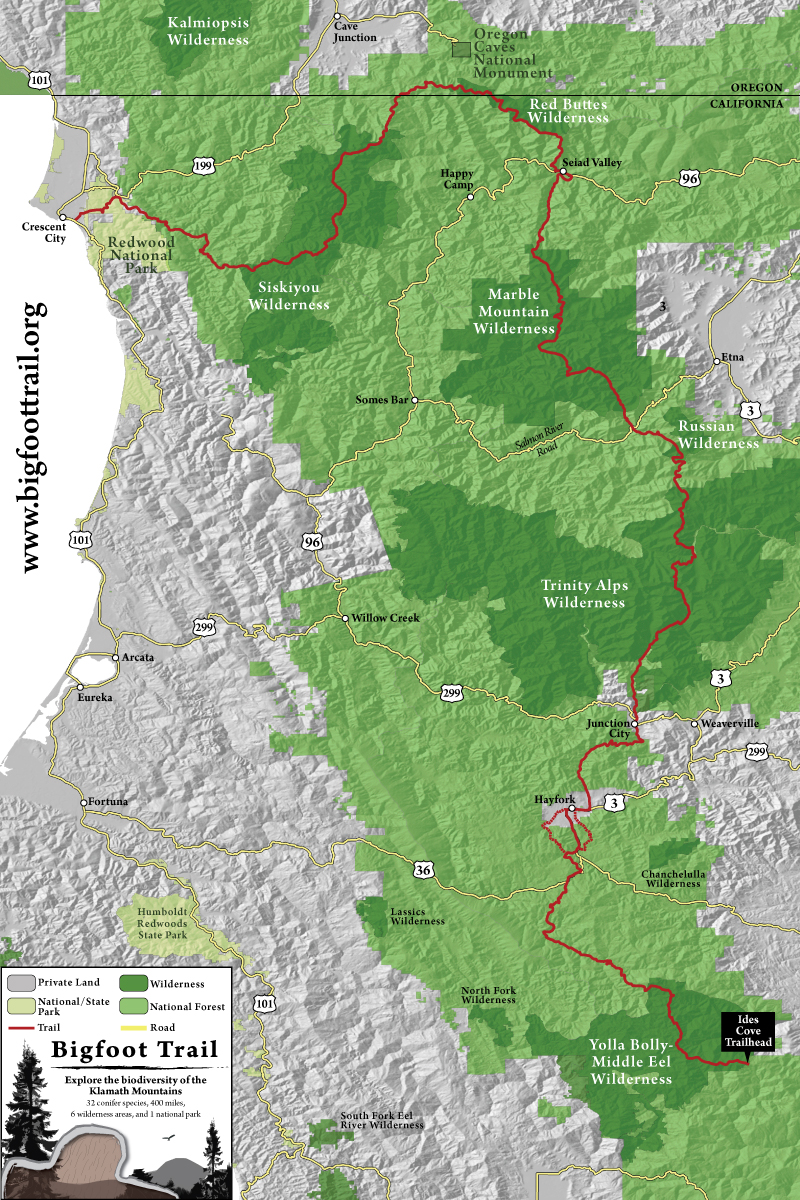
The Bigfoot Trail Route

The trail passes through these areas, listed south to north:

- Mendocino National Forest

Yolla Bolly-Middle Eel Wilderness

- Shasta-Trinity National Forest

Trinity Alps Wilderness

- Klamath National Forest

Russian Wilderness
Marble Mountain Wilderness
Red Buttes Wilderness
Siskiyou Wilderness

- Six Rivers National Forest

Siskiyou Wilderness

- Smith River National Recreation Area
- Jedediah Smith Redwoods State Park
- Redwood National Park

== Flora ==
The botanical diversity exists in northwest California because of a variety of factors that have remained "consistent" for millions of years. Northwest California features many paleoendemics, and fosters the growth of new species, called neoendemics, in unusual nooks created by complex climate and soils. These small microclimates, linked with isolation, create this unique setting.

Northwest California is an ancient meeting ground—having a central location and continuity with other mountain ranges as well as a proximity to the Pacific Ocean. While there are many endemic plants in northwest California, the endemic and relict conifers are of particular interest and importance because there is so much diversity in such a small area. There are 3,540 vascular plant taxa (species, subspecies, and variations) of plants—and as many as 38 species of conifers depending on where one delineates northwest California The Klamath Mountains fosters one of the most diverse temperate coniferous forests on Earth and the Bigfoot Trail is in place to visit and celebrate that diversity.

== Geology ==
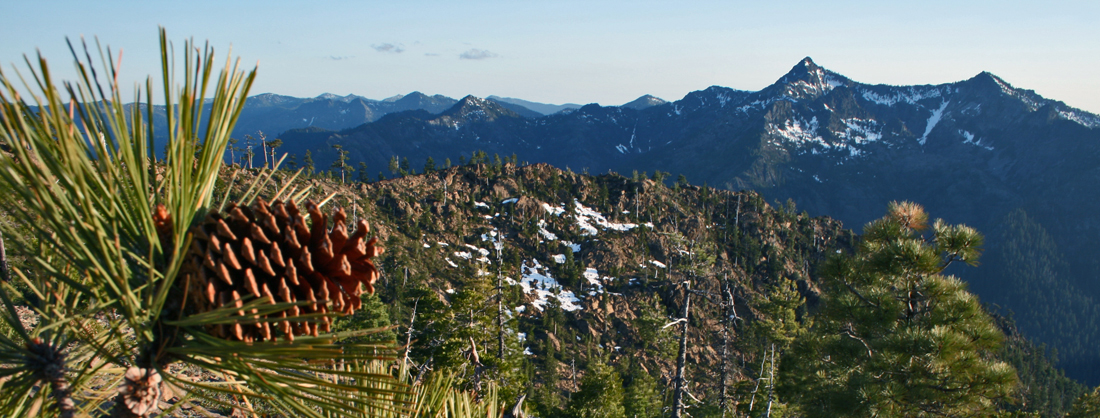
Serpentine outcrops in the Siskiyou Wilderness foster the growth of Jeffrey pine

For the majority of the route, the Bigfoot Trail is in the Klamath Mountains. Topographically, the Klamath Mountains are part of the set of coastal ranges that run roughly parallel to the Pacific Ocean in California and Oregon, but the Klamath Mountains differ in history, complexity, and geological character. In fact, the Klamath Mountains' closest geological connection is to the Sierra Nevada (U.S.). While most of northwest California can geologically be referred to as the Klamath Mountain Province, the region also presents a coastal area called the North California Coast Range. The first 27 miles and final 16 miles traverse the Coast Range (here defined as the Franciscan Complex). This geologic region also has its share of interesting botanical rarities.

The geology of northwest California has helped foster the regions high plant species diversity. Complex soils of the Klamath Mountains have helped create a spectrum of subtle microclimates in which plant species have been able to "hide out" and evolve.

== Climate ==
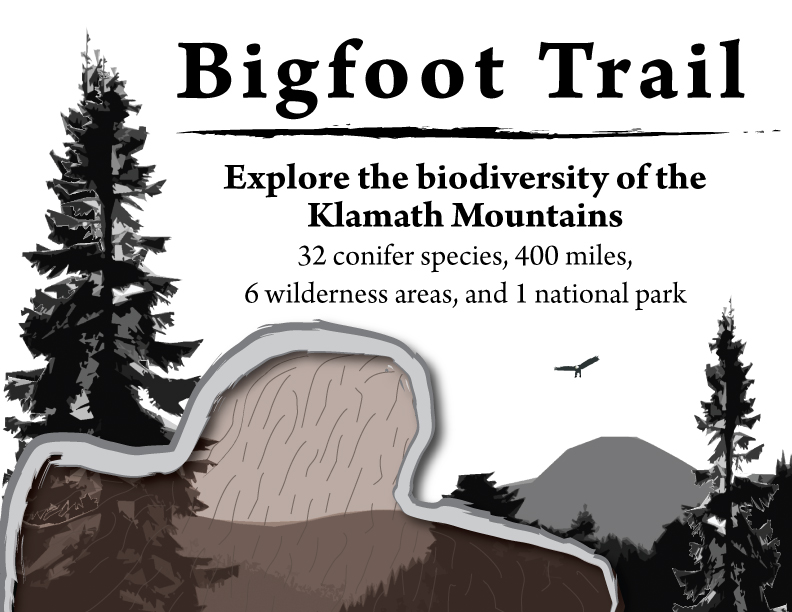
Bigfoot Trail Logo

On a grand scale, the area is comfortable for plant growth compared to other areas of the West—there is a moderate climate. The region fosters three distinct climatic gradients. First, there is a north-to-south trend of decreasing winter precipitation and warmer summer temperatures. Second, there is a west to east trend away from cooler and moister summer temperatures to a warmer, drier environment. Third, a montane gradient is expressed in which temperature decreases and precipitation increases with elevation. While in California's Mediterranean climate it is difficult to calculate an "average" level of precipitation—as fluctuations from year to year are common—northwest California offers more year-to-year stability than any other place in the state. These climatic gradients contribute to the plant diversity of the region—and the botanical rarities that can be seen along the Bigfoot Trail. Because the trail traverses varied topography by first traveling in a south to north direction and then east to west, many of northwest California's common and unique vegetation types are visited.
