= Marble Mountains (Siskiyou County) =

Mountain range in California, United States

- Location within California

Highest point
- Elevation: 2,516 m (8,255 ft)

Geography
- Country: United States
- State: California
- Region: Shasta Cascade
- District: Siskiyou County
- Range coordinates: 41°34′43.482″N 123°5′31.148″W
- Topo map: USGS Boulder Peak

The term Marble Mountains is a common term for the northwestern portion of the Salmon Mountains range in northwestern California. The Salmon Mountains are themselves a sub-range of the Klamath Mountains, which are a constituent part of the greater Northwest U.S. Coast Ranges. The local name derives from Marble Mountain and Black Marble Mountain, prominent peaks and the namesake of the surrounding Marble Mountain Wilderness Area. The term "Marble Mountains" is commonly applied not only to the ridges of Marble Mountain and Black Marble Mountain themselves but as a name for the northwestern ranges of the Salmon Mountains.

The 242,500-acre (981 km^{2}) Marble Mountain Wilderness is a forested area and contains 89 lakes stocked with trout. Large streams have steelhead trout and salmon. Bear, deer and other wildlife are plentiful. Long recognized for its wild value, this region became a Primitive area in 1931, a Wilderness in 1953, and a part of the National Wilderness Preservation System in 1964.

The area where the Marble Mountains now exist was once part of the flat bottom of an ancient, shallow ocean. Millions of years ago, violent volcanic upheavings and the erosive cutting action of rivers and glaciers combined to form the Marble Mountains. Marble Mountain itself is composed primarily of prehistoric marine invertebrates. Almost all the lakes of the Marble Mountains were formed by ancient glacial activity.

The Pacific Crest Trail runs through the wilderness near the crest of the range for 32 miles (51 km). The Marble Mountain Wilderness features an unparalleled diversity of plant life found nowhere else in the state. More species of conifers (17) live in proximity here than any place else in the world. These trees include the Brewer's spruce, incense cedar, Western Juniper; white, subalpine, and Shasta red fir; Engelmann spruce, mountain hemlock, Pacific yew; and whitebark, knobcone, foxtail, lodgepole, sugar, ponderosa, and Western white pine.

The Marble Mountains form part of the drainages of the Salmon, Scott, and Klamath rivers.

Marble Mountain can be reached by trail access via State Route 96 between Hamburg and Somes Bar, State Route 3 via the Scott River Road between Scott Bar and Fort Jones or State Route 3 via Salmon River Road.
