= Yolla Bolly–Middle Eel Wilderness =

Protected wilderness area in California, US

- IUCN category Ib (wilderness area)
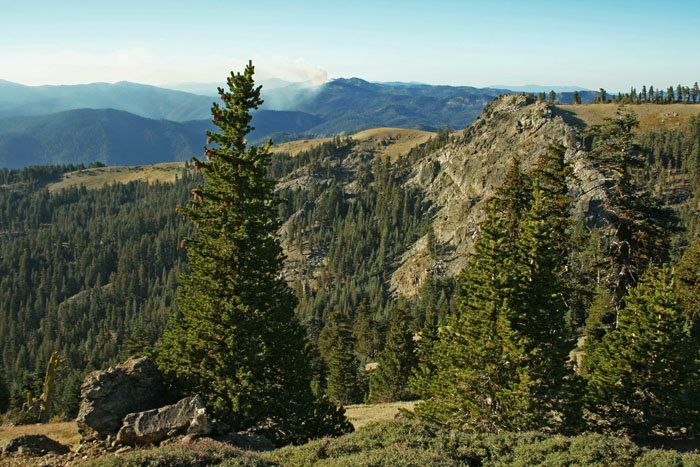

- Location within California Location within the United States
- Interactive map of Yolla Bolly–Middle Eel Wilderness
- Location: Yolla Bolly Range of the Klamath Mountains and Inner Northern California Coast Ranges, both of which are constituent regions of the greater Northern U.S. Coast Ranges; Tehama / Trinity / Mendocino Counties, California, United States
- Nearest city: Covelo, California
- Coordinates: 40°03′45″N 123°13′19″W
- Area: 180,877 acres (731.98 km^{2}; 282.620 mi^{2})
- Established: 1964
- Governing body: U.S. Forest Service / Bureau of Land Management

The Yolla Bolly–Middle Eel Wilderness is a federally designated wilderness area in the Yolla Bolly Range of the southern Klamath Mountains and the Inner Northern California Coast Ranges, in Northern California.

== Geography ==
The wilderness area is located northeast of Covelo, 45 miles (72 km) west of Red Bluff and Interstate 5, and east of Garberville and U.S. Route 101. It is within sections of eastern Mendocino County, western Tehama County, and Trinity County.

The Yolla Bolly–Middle Eel Wilderness was created by the Wilderness Act of 1964, with an original land area of 689 km^{2} (266 sq mi). It was enlarged by the California Wilderness Act of 1984, and again by the Northern California Coastal Wild Heritage Wilderness Act of 2006, for a present-day total of 732 square kilometres (283 sq mi).

Most of the area (700 km^{2} (270 sq mi)) is managed by the US Forest Service and is within three national forest boundaries, the: Mendocino National Forest, Shasta-Trinity National Forest and Six Rivers National Forest. The remaining 32 km^{2} (12 sq mi) is managed by the Bureau of Land Management. The name is a combination of: a phrase from the Native American Wintun language of the region's Wintun peoples, Yo-la meaning snow-covered and Bo-li meaning high peak; and a reference to the Middle fork of the Eel River.

Elevations range from 2,700 feet (820 m) to a high point of 8,092 feet (2,466 m) at the summit of Mount Linn.

== Climate ==
Climate data for North Yolla Bolly, California
Month	Jan	Feb	Mar	Apr	May	Jun	Jul	Aug	Sep	Oct	Nov	Dec	Year
Mean daily maximum °F (°C)	39 (4)	38 (3)	41 (5)	47 (8)	56 (13)	65 (18)	75 (24)	74 (23)	70 (21)	59 (15)	44 (7)	38 (3)	54 (12)
Mean daily minimum °F (°C)	25 (−4)	24 (−4)	24 (−4)	26 (−3)	33 (1)	40 (4)	45 (7)	45 (7)	41 (5)	35 (2)	29 (−2)	24 (−4)	33 (0)
Average precipitation inches (mm)	15.29 (388)	13.35 (339)	11.04 (280)	5.95 (151)	3.60 (91)	1.05 (27)	0.40 (10)	0.21 (5.3)	0.40 (10)	3.98 (101)	9.59 (244)	15.79 (401)	80.65 (2,047.3)
Source: Prism

== History ==
In 1927, U.S. Chief Forester William Greeley directed the district supervisors to study and recommend areas in the nation's forests suitable for a new classification as "wilderness." By 1929 fourteen areas in the California Region 5 forests were proposed for this designation.

The regulations for wilderness areas, known as the L-20, became − with modifications by Secretary of Agriculture William Jardine − the management policy for these areas. The L-20 Regulations used the term "primitive areas" with the purpose stated as to:

maintain primitive conditions of environment, transportation, habitation, and subsistence with a view to conserving the value of such areas for purposes of public education and recreation.

Of the three new "primitive areas" located in northern California, the Middle Eel–Yolla Bolla Primitive Area was the largest at 810 km^{2} (310 sq mi). The size was reduced to 433.8 km^{2} (167.5 sq mi) in 1931. By the close of 1932 California had eighteen new primitive areas protecting 7,700 km^{2} (3,000 sq mi).

Federal protection was given when this area became part of the National Wilderness Preservation System, created by the passage of the Wilderness Act of 1964.

== Waterways ==
Located within the southern Klamath Mountains and Inner Northern California Coast Ranges, the rugged topography of the Yolla Bolly–Middle Eel Wilderness protects headwaters of the Middle Fork of the Eel River, the North Fork of the Eel, the Mad River, the South Fork of the Trinity River and the East Fork of the South Fork Trinity River. The eastern side has the watersheds of Cottonwood and Thomes Creeks, which flow into the Sacramento River. The very northern tip of the wilderness—around the summits of Black Rock Mountain and North Yolla Bolly Peak—are in the Klamath Mountain Range. Both the Middle and North Forks of the Eel River have Wild and Scenic River designation, as does the South Fork of the Trinity River. Several small, shallow lakes occur in remnant glacial basins near the highest peaks. Numerous springs are found off of the main ridgetops. The largest of these include North Yolla Bolly Lake, Black Rock Lake, Square Lake, and Long Lake.

== Flora and fauna ==
The wilderness has Coast Range and Klamath montane, mixed evergreen and Douglas fir forest types. Conifers include the California endemic foxtail pine, ponderosa pine, red fir and white fir, the rare western white pine, sugar pine, incense cedar, and the Pacific yew. Other tree species include oaks and cottonwoods. The southern side of Shell Mountain is home to a rare stand of Juniper trees. The Cedar Basin area is also home to the farthest western stand of Quaking Aspen trees. The area includes wet meadows and open grasslands supporting abundant deer herds (as well as cattle and sheep but they are mainly kept out of the wilderness area). Lower elevations have chamise, manzanita, and ceanothus.

Wildlife in the wilderness includes black bear, Roosevelt elk, black-tailed deer, gray fox, mountain lion, bobcat, coyote, northern flying squirrel, fisher and martin. The northern spotted owl can be found here, as well as eagles, hawks, turkey vultures and smaller birds like grouse, quail, and band-tailed pigeon. On rare occasions Turkey and herds of wild horse have been spotted as well.

Rainbow trout live in most larger streams, such as in the South Fork of Cottonwood Creek, and in Black Rock Lake. The Middle Fork Eel River watershed and the South Fork Trinity River watershed has summer- and winter-run steelhead and spring-run and fall-run chinook salmon, but fishing is restricted. North Yolla Bolly lake was also stocked with Eastern Brook Trout but few remain. Coho Salmon and German Brown Trout have also been seen in many of the rivers but are rare.

== Geology ==
Rocks in the northern mountains are predominantly gray greenstone while the southern mountains include sandstone and serpentine of the Franciscan formation. Cirque basins from former glaciers are seen above about 6,000 feet (1,800 m) elevation. Extensive faulting in the rocks makes the region prone to erosion, slumping and landslides. One modern landslide near Ides Cove, on the north flank of Mount Linn, reached more than two miles (3 km) toward the South Fork Cottonwood Creek, upending old-growth forests and leaving large fissures on its perimeter.

== Recreation ==
Recreational activities include backpacking, day-hiking, camping, fishing, hunting, and nature photography. There are 15 trailheads all around the wilderness boundary with the most frequent users being hunters in the autumn months. Visitor use has one of the lowest densities among wilderness areas in California. The Ides Cove Loop Trail is over 10 miles (16 km) in length and travels through very scenic areas. This trailhead is also the beginning of the Bigfoot Trail. The US Forest Service encourages visitors to use Leave No Trace ethics when visiting the wilderness to minimize impact to the environment.

Access to trailheads on the northwest side of the wilderness is available by paved road from Ruth. Other roads suitable for most passenger vehicles reach the south boundary from Covelo and the east boundary from Corning or Red Bluff.

== See also ==
- Flora of the Klamath Mountains
- Endemic flora of California
- Natural history of the California Coast Ranges
- Wilderness areas of California
