= Kangaroo Lake (California) =

Lake in the state of California, United States

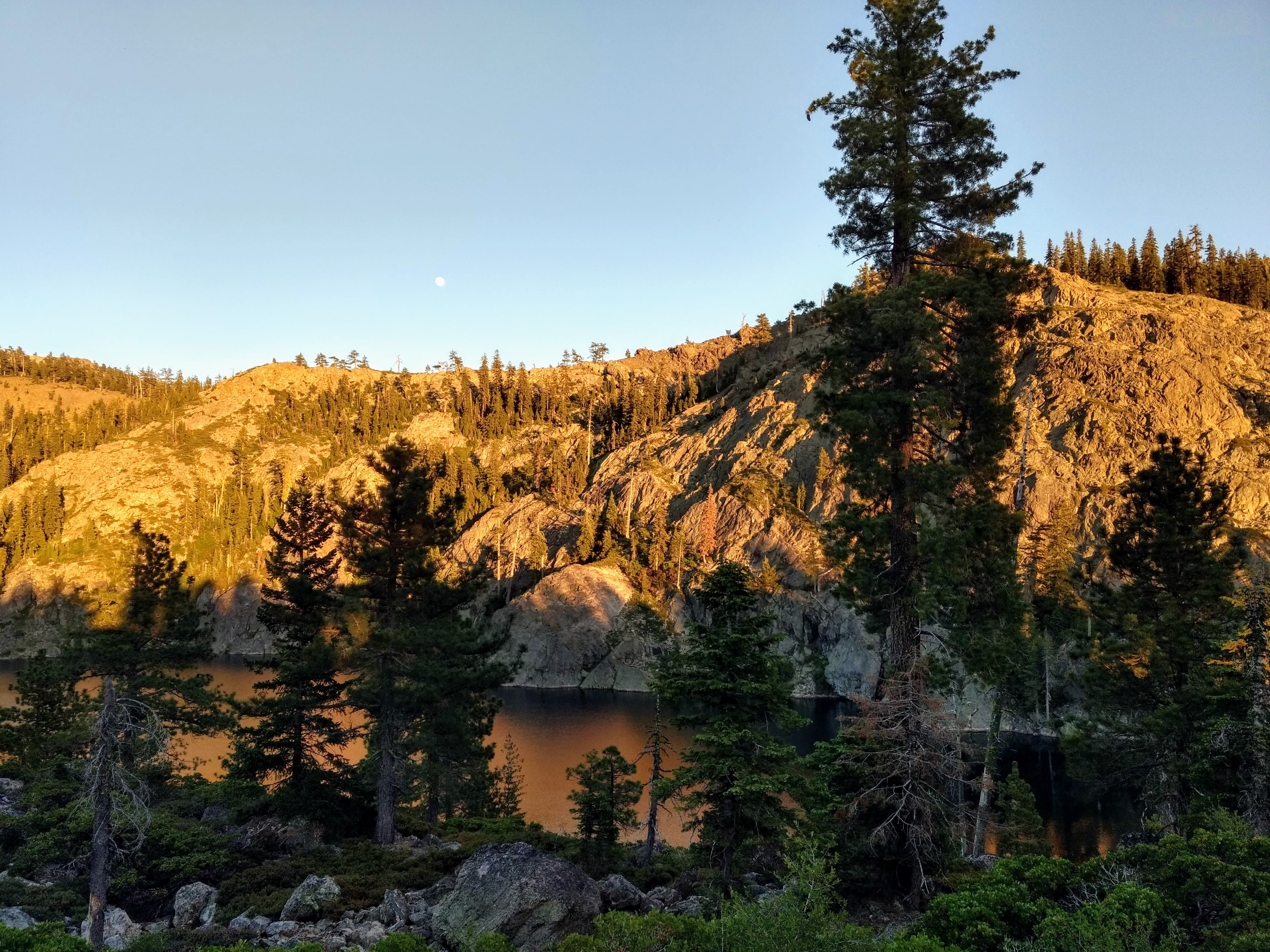
- Kangaroo Lake viewed from the nearby campground.

- Location within California Location within the United States
- Location: Klamath National Forest, Siskiyou County, California, United States
- Coordinates: 41°20′02″N 122°38′06″W
- Surface area: 21 acres (8.5 ha)

Kangaroo Lake is a lake located in Klamath National Forest. The lake covers 21 acres (8.5 ha) and contains large brook trout. There is a nearby campground with both drive-in and walk-in campsites. Non-motorized boats are allowed on the lake, although there is no boat ramp.

== See also ==
- List of lakes in California
