= Sawyers Bar Catholic Church =

Historic church in California, United States

- U.S. National Register of Historic Places
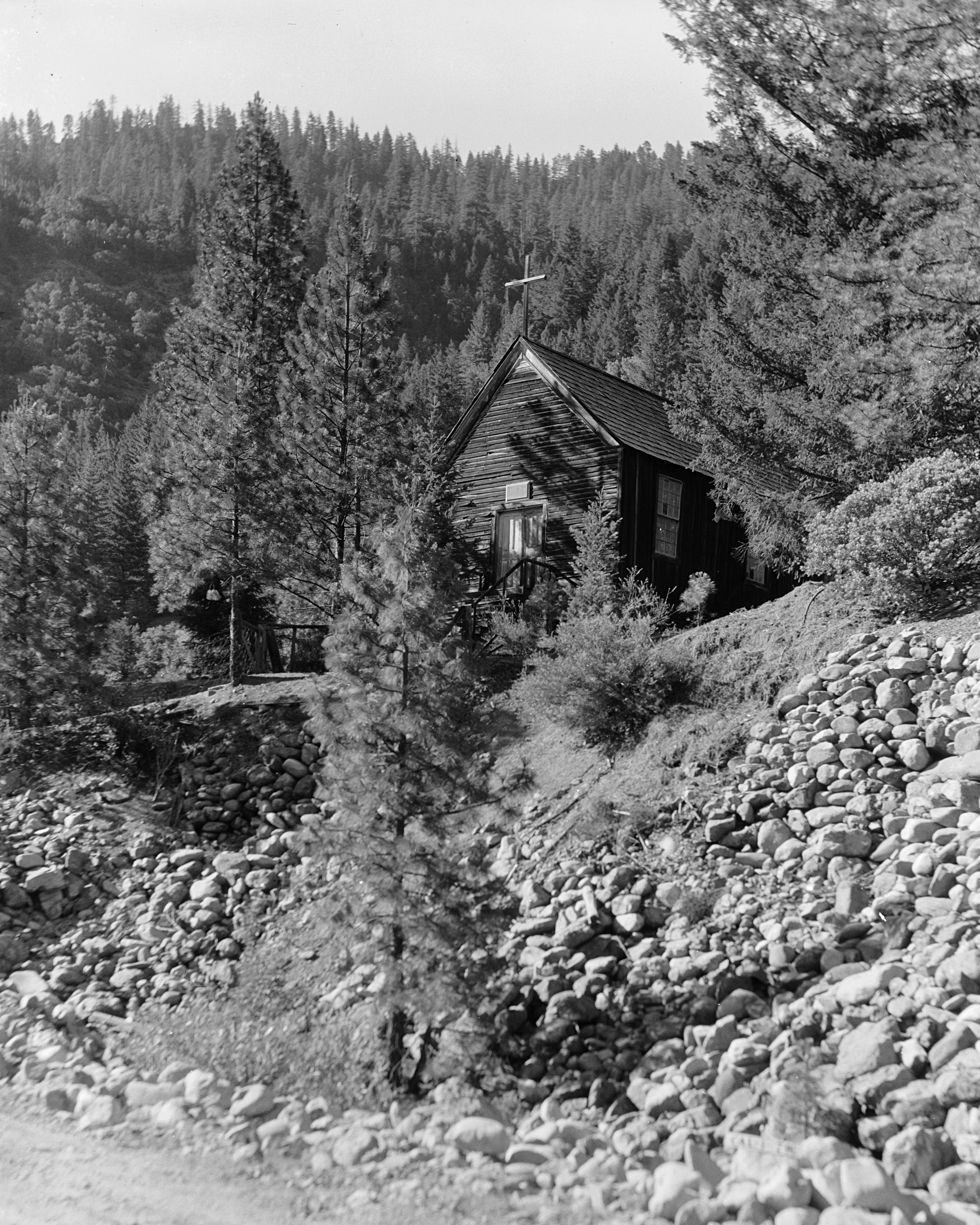

- Location within California Location within the United States
- Location: Klamath National Forest, Sawyers Bar, California
- Coordinates: 41°18′3″N 123°8′10″W
- Area: 0.6 acres (0.24 ha)
- Built: 1855
- NRHP reference No.: 78000792
- Added to NRHP: July 7, 1978

Sawyers Bar Catholic Church (St. Joseph's Catholic Church) is a historic church building in the Klamath National Forest in Sawyers Bar, California, within the Roman Catholic Diocese of Sacramento.

The church was built in 1855 under the direction of Father Florian Schwenninger, a Benedictine monk, who had come to the area of the Salmon River to serve the needs of the Catholic population among the local miners. The first Mass was celebrated in 1857. The site also contains a graveyard with graves dating to as early as 1850. The Church was added to the National Register of Historic Places in 1978.

Today, the church is considered a mission church of Sacred Heart Parish in Fort Jones, CA.
