= Trinity Alps Wilderness =

Protected wilderness area in California, United States

- IUCN category Ib (wilderness area)
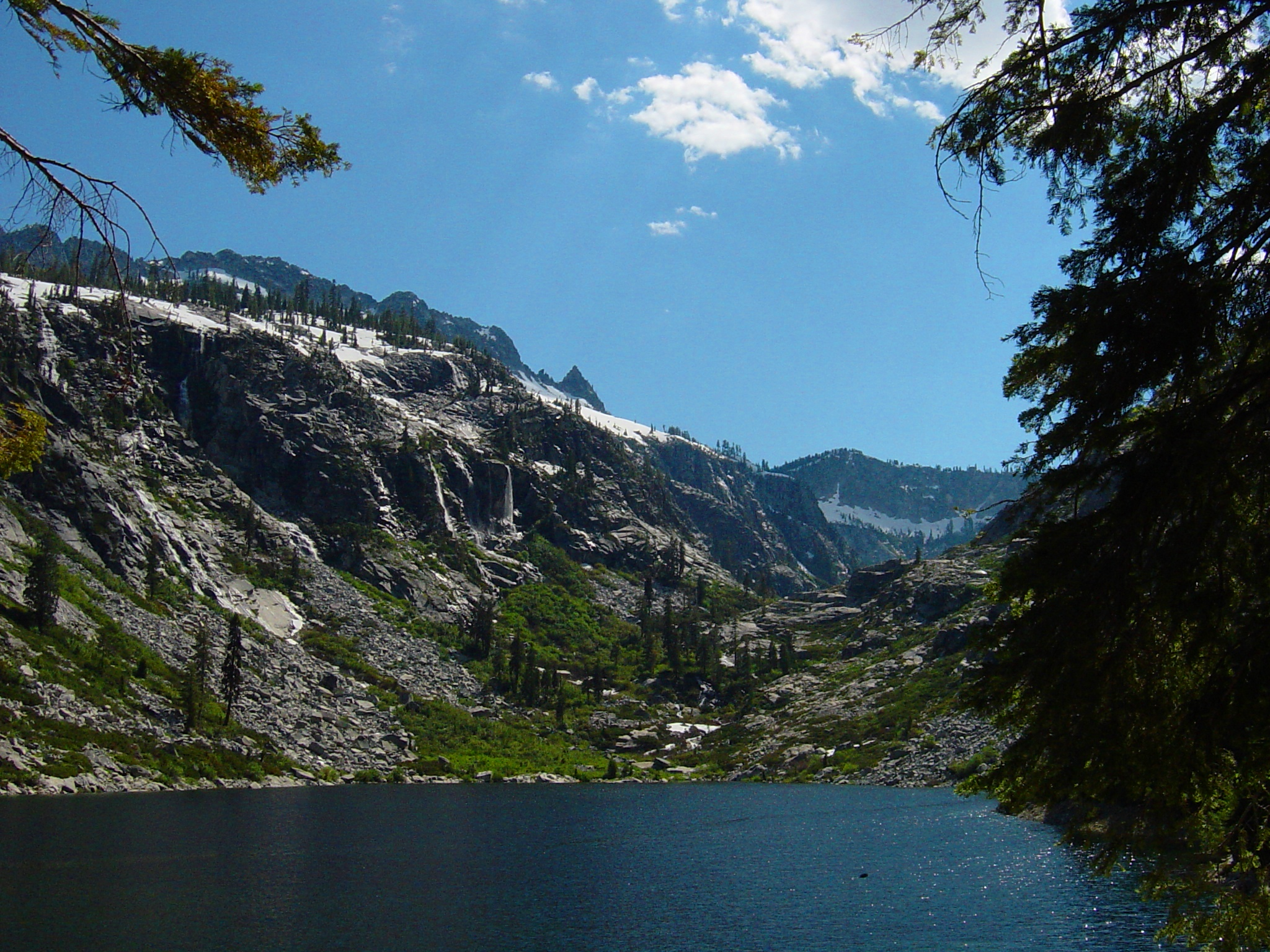
- 55 large alpine lakes dot the Trinity Alps Wilderness, with more than 100 smaller ones

- Location within California Location within the United States
- Interactive map of Trinity Alps Wilderness
- Location: Trinity / Siskiyou / Humboldt counties, California, United States
- Nearest city: Weaverville, California
- Coordinates: 41°01′00″N 123°05′10″W
- Area: 537,537 acres (2,175.34 km^{2}; 839.902 mi^{2})
- Established: 1984
- Governing body: U.S. Forest Service / Bureau of Land Management

The Trinity Alps Wilderness is an 537,357 acres (2,174.61 km^{2}) designated wilderness located in northern California, roughly between Eureka and Redding. It is wholly administered by the U.S. Forest Service through the Shasta-Trinity, Klamath, and Six Rivers National Forests. The wilderness is located in the Salmon and Scott Mountains, subranges of the Klamath Mountains region. The high, granitic and ultramafic peaks of the eastern half of the wilderness area are known as the Trinity Alps. Granite peaks at the core of the area are known as the White Trinities, reddish ultramafic peaks in the southeast are known as the Red Trinities, and the forested mountains in the western half of the wilderness are known as the Green Trinities.

== Flora and fauna ==
The botanical diversity of the Trinity Alps is quite unique. The region has intrigued botanists for many years because of the predominance of the Sierran flora only 60 miles (100 kilometers) from the Pacific Ocean. Conifers common in the Sierra Nevada such as foxtail pines, lodgepole pines, western white pines, whitebark pines, ponderosa pines, red firs, and white firs are also common in the Alps alongside the endemic Brewer spruce. Large wildfires swept through the western forests in recent years.

Wildlife species include American black bears, black-tailed deer, cougars, coyotes, bobcats, porcupine, spotted skunk, various birds of prey and songbirds . Bears are common in the wilderness, so use a bear bag or bear canister.

== Geology and Hydrology ==
Glacial cirques dominate the high country. The highest point is Thompson Peak at 9,001 ft (2,744 m).

The North Fork Trinity River from Hobo Gultch downstream to the wilderness boundary, and the New River from the confluence of Virgin Creek and Slide downstream to the wilderness boundary are both designated as Wild.

== Recreation ==
The wilderness contains approximately 520 miles (840 km) of hiking trails, including 17 miles (27 km) of the Pacific Crest Trail and 35 miles (60 km) of the Bigfoot Trail. The most popular entry points into the wilderness are from the Weaverville area around Trinity Lake or from Junction City. Additional routes are seasonally accessible by car from the north and west. The paved road north from Junction City leads to the Canyon Creek trail, the most popular trail in the wilderness. The longest trails take several days to complete. The Pacific Crest Trail traverses the Scott Mountains in the northeast portion of the wilderness.

Glacial cirques hold many small lakes stocked with trout and ponds frequented by newts. Streams offer trout fishing, and tributaries to the lower Trinity River hold migratory steelhead and chinook salmon. Hunting occurs in late summer and fall for deer, bear, and bandtailed pigeon.

Although some of the high lakes are popular in summer, most of the land is infrequently visited. Many of the trails are in poor condition and hard to follow, so skills with map and compass are essential. Rock climbing opportunities are excellent on vast granite slabs and peaks.

Historic gold mining structures and relics add interest for visitors in various parts of the wilderness. Gold panning continues to be good for the experienced amateur.

Granite Peak is a good destination for views as well as Silligo peak, on the Four Lakes Loop. Trinity Lake is visible to the south, and much of the rest of the area is visible as well. Remnants of the old lookout station remain.

== Private land ==
Until recently, about 4,000 acres (6.3 mi^{2}; 16 km^{2}) of private land (inholdings) remained within the Trinity Alps Wilderness. Purchases by the Wilderness Land Trust have reduced this acreage by more than 40%.
