= Red Buttes Wilderness =

Protected wilderness area in California and Oregon, United States

- IUCN category Ib (wilderness area)
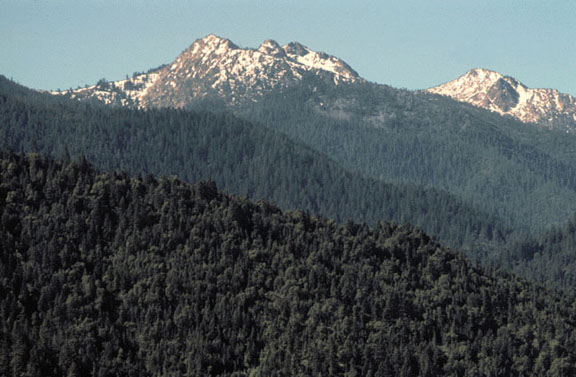
- Interactive map of Red Buttes Wilderness
- Location: Siskiyou County, California / Josephine County, Oregon, United States
- Coordinates: 42°00′34″N 123°22′44″W
- Area: 19,940 acres (80.7 km^{2}; 31.16 mi^{2})
- Established: 1984
- Governing body: United States Forest Service

The Red Buttes Wilderness is a wilderness area in the Klamath and Rogue River national forests in the U.S. states of Oregon and California. It comprises 19,940 acres (80.7 km^{2}; 31.16 mi^{2}), approximately 16,190 acres (65.5 km^{2}; 25.30 mi^{2}) of which is located in California, and 3,750 acres (15.2 km^{2}; 5.86 mi^{2}) in Oregon. It was established by the California Wilderness Act of 1984 and the Oregon Wilderness Act of 1984.

== Topography ==
Red Buttes Wilderness is situated in both Oregon and California and includes the crest of the Siskiyou Mountains between the Rogue River and Klamath River drainages. The wilderness is 13 miles (21 km) long and 6 miles (9.7 km) wide, with elevations ranging from 2,800 feet (853 m) in Butte Fork Canyon to 6,740 feet (2,054 m) at the east summit of the Red Buttes.

The main waterways that flow through Red Buttes Wilderness are all part of the Rogue River watershed, including the Butte Fork and the Middle Fork of the Applegate River, as well as Sucker Creek, a tributary of the Illinois River. The Wilderness contains the headwaters of the Illinois River.

== Geology ==
Red Buttes Wilderness takes its name from the dominant peak along the Siskiyou Crest; because of its high iron and magnesium content, the butte's rock is a reddish-orange color.

The Siskiyou Mountains are part of the larger "Klamath Mountains Province" of southwestern Oregon and northwestern California, and they include some of the oldest rocks in the region. The former ocean-bottom sediments that make up most of the Wilderness are several hundred million years old. Over time they were slowly changed by pressure and heat into the complex variety of metamorphic rocks present today: schist, quartzite, gneiss, and several outcrops of white marble. During the last ice age small glaciers sculpted the Siskiyou basins that now contain lakes and meadows.

== Flora and fauna ==
=== Flora ===
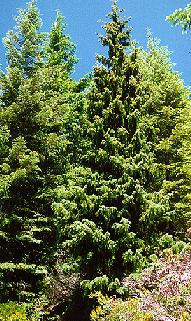
Brewer spruce (Picea breweriana)

At the lowest elevations of the Red Buttes Wilderness is found a magnificent old-growth forest of ponderosa pine, sugar pine, Douglas-fir and incense-cedar, with an understory of Pacific madrone, canyon live oak, and chinquapin. On the higher slopes are found white fir, Shasta red fir, and mountain hemlock. Knobcone pine is also common along some dry, rocky ridges. Perhaps the most distinctive vegetation community is that found on the peridotite/serpentinite outcrops - Jeffrey pine, western white pine, and Brewer spruce. A small stand of subalpine fir was also recently discovered by Frank Callahan in the wilderness.

Some of the plant species in the Wilderness - such as Brewer's spruce, Sadler oak, Siskiyou lewisia, and a number of sclerophyllous shrubs - are found only in southwestern Oregon and northwestern California.

=== Fauna ===
The Wilderness is home to a wide variety of animals. Black-tailed deer are common, while American black bears, California Valley coyotes, banded bobcats, ring-tail cats, and North American cougars are less common but still may be seen. A number of small mammals, particularly members of the rodent and weasel families, inhabit the area. Many species of birds can be seen in the Wilderness, including eagles, hawks, falcons, northern goshawks, owls, Steller's jays, and ravens.

Unsubstantiated sightings of the infamous Bigfoot or Sasquatch date back over the last century.

== History ==
Beginning perhaps as early as 8,000 years ago, Native American groups traveled and hunted along this portion of the Siskiyou Crest. By late prehistoric times, the Dakubetede Indians of the Applegate Valley used this area, probably sharing it on occasion with their neighbors the Shasta, the Karok, and the Takelma. They hunted deer, bighorn sheep, elk, and grizzly bear. Arrowheads, scrapers, and other stone tools from several thousand years of human prehistory have been found in the Red Buttes Wilderness.

The first non-native people to visit the Red Buttes Wilderness most likely came through during the Siskiyou Mountain gold rush in the early 1850s. Prospecting and small-scale mining, along with trapping, hunting, livestock grazing, continued to bring local residents up into the Wilderness during the late 19th and early 20th centuries. In the 1920s and 1930s, the Forest Service built trails and a few cabins in the remote area, and during World War II, the U.S. government constructed a narrow mining road from the Klamath River to the chromite deposits on the south slope of the Red Buttes. In 1945, a single-engine airplane crashed in the Red Buttes Wilderness. A bronze plaque along the Butte Fork Trail marks the grave of three victims on board. In 1984, the area was designated Wilderness and afforded the protections laid out in the Wilderness Act of 1964.

== Recreation ==
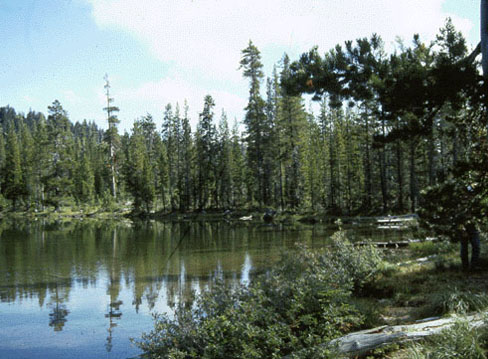
Azalea Lake in Red Buttes Wilderness

Primary recreational activities in the Wilderness include hiking, camping, horseback riding, and wildlife watching. Several hiking trails run throughout the Wilderness, including Azalea Lake Trail, Frog Pond Trail, Cameron Meadows Trail, and Butte Fork Trail. The Bigfoot Trail also passes through the wilderness, using the Boundary National Recreation Trail as well as other seldom hiked trails.

== See also ==
- Kalmiopsis Wilderness
- List of Oregon Wildernesses
- List of U.S. Wilderness Areas
- List of old growth forests
