= Klamath National Forest =

National forest in California, US

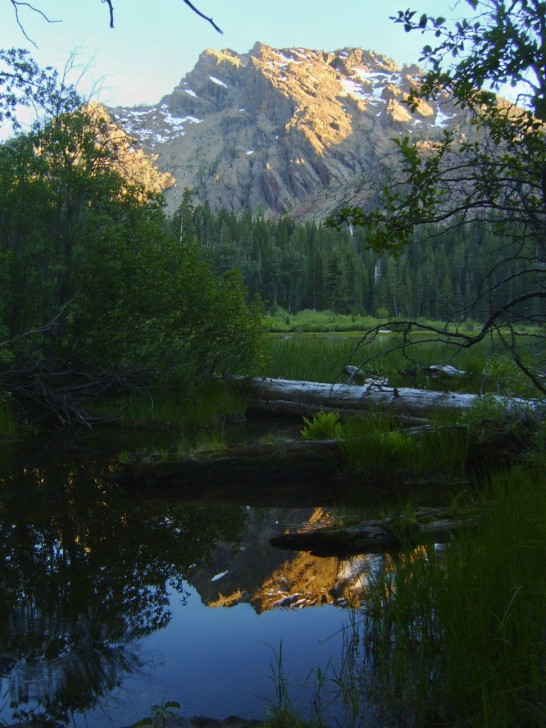
- Little Elk Lake in Klamath National Forest
- Interactive map of Klamath National Forest
- Location: Siskiyou County, California / Jackson County, Oregon
- Nearest city: Yreka, California
- Coordinates: 41°30′01″N 123°20′00″W
- Area: 1,737,774 acres (7,032.52 km^{2})
- Governing body: U.S. Forest Service
- Website: Klamath National Forest

Klamath National Forest is a 1,737,774-acre (2,715 mi^{2}; 7,033 km^{2}) national forest, in the Klamath Mountains and Cascade Range, located in Siskiyou County in northern California, but with a tiny extension (1.5 percent of the forest) into southern Jackson County in Oregon. The forest contains continuous stands of ponderosa pine, Jeffrey pine, Douglas fir, red fir, white fir, lodgepole pine, Baker Cypress (Cupressus bakeri), and incense cedar. Old growth forest is estimated to cover some 168,000 acres (680 km^{2}) of forest land. Forest headquarters are located in Yreka, California. There are local ranger district offices located in Fort Jones, Happy Camp, and Macdoel, all in California. The Klamath was established on May 6, 1905. This forest includes the Kangaroo Lake and the Sawyers Bar Catholic Church, which are located within the boundaries of the Forest. The Forest is managed jointly with the Butte Valley National Grassland.

== Wilderness areas ==
There are four officially designated wilderness areas in Klamath National Forest that are part of the National Wilderness Preservation System. Two of them extend into neighboring national forests, and one of those into land managed by the Bureau of Land Management.

- Marble Mountain Wilderness
- Russian Wilderness
- Red Buttes Wilderness
- Siskiyou Wilderness (mostly in Six Rivers NF)
- Trinity Alps Wilderness (mostly in Trinity NF; partly in Shasta NF, Six Rivers NF, and BLM land)

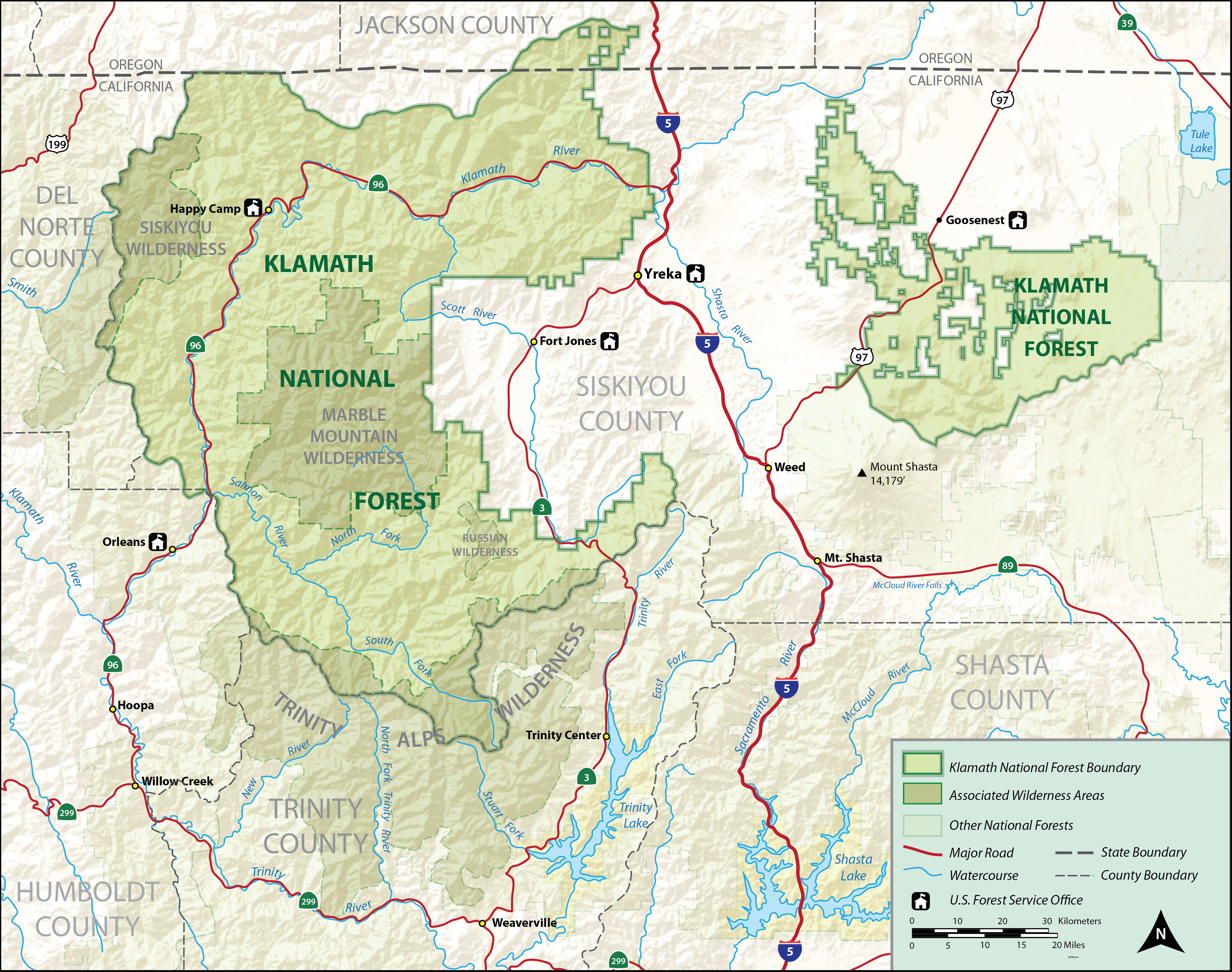
Map of the Klamath National Forest

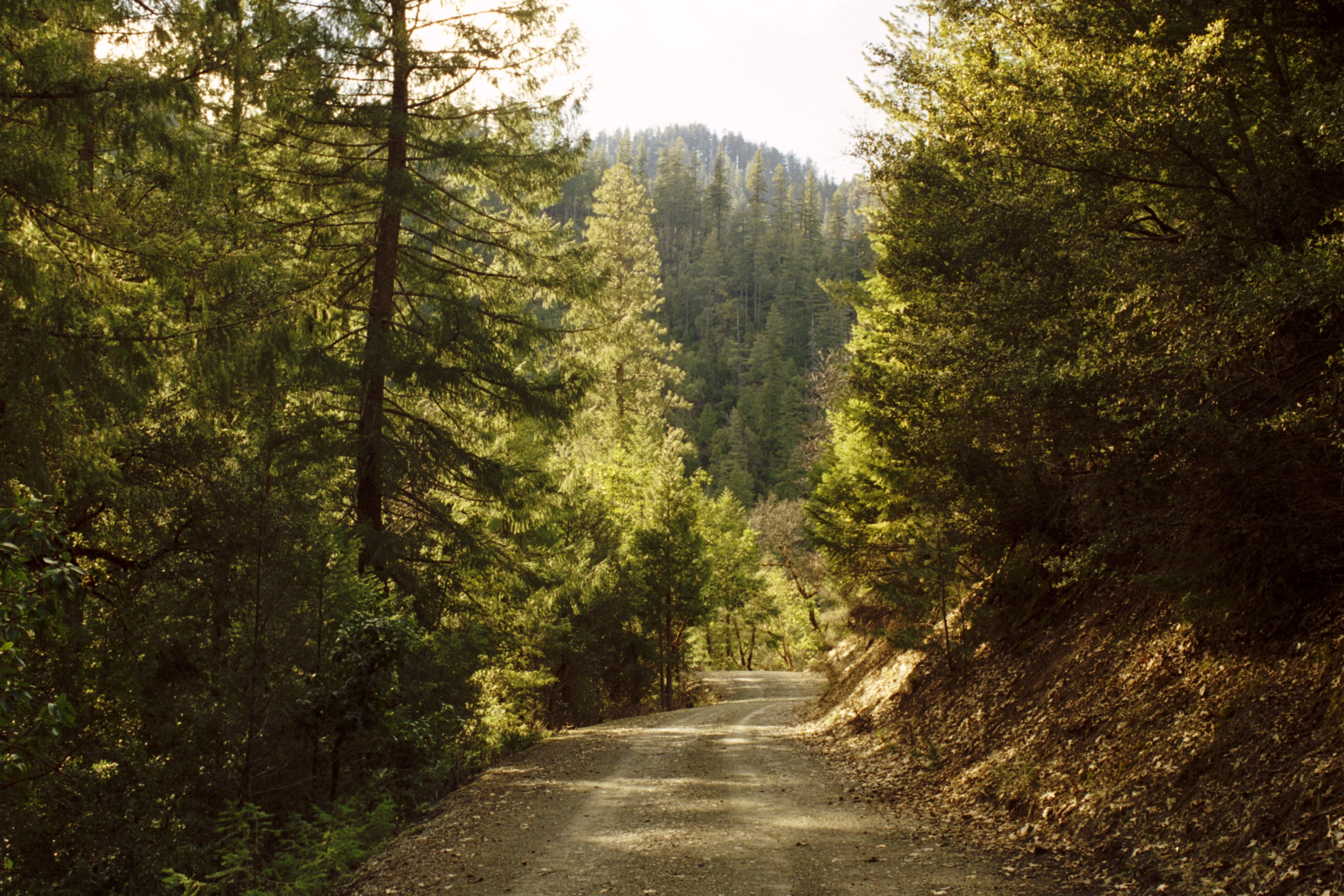
Klamath National Forest

== Local activism ==
Between the late 1980s and 2010, the Klamath Forest Alliance played major roles in the "timber wars" in the Klamath/Siskiyou Bioregion of Northwest California and Southwest Oregon, including timber sale appeals and litigation to defend roadless areas, the Northern Spotted Owl controversy, and efforts to protect Ancient Forests through federal legislation.

== See also ==
- List of national forests of the United States
