= Salmon Mountains =

Subrange of the Klamath Mountains, California

- Russian Lake in the Salmon Mountains

Highest point
- Elevation: 2,726 m (8,944 ft)

Geography
- Location within California
- Country: United States
- State: California
- Region(s): Klamath National Forest, Shasta-Trinity National Forest and Six Rivers National Forest
- District: Siskiyou County
- Range coordinates: 41°12′N 123°13′W
- Topo map: USGS Thompson Peak

The Salmon Mountains are a subrange of the Klamath Mountains in Siskiyou and Trinity Counties in northwestern California.

== Geography ==
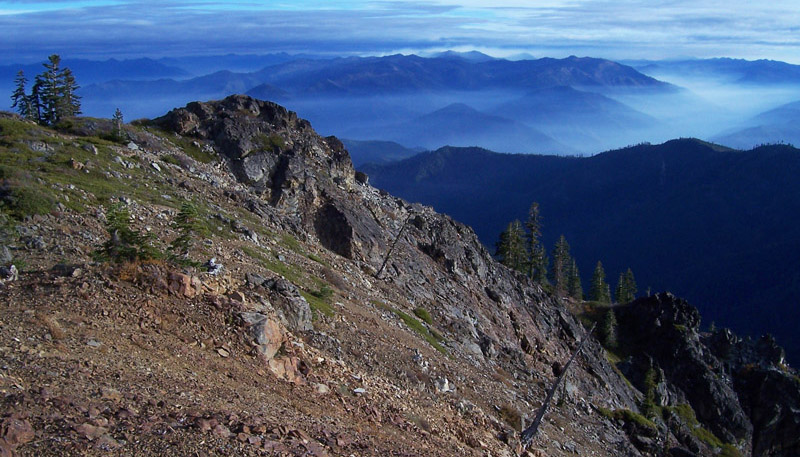
View from Salmon Mountains, as a wildfire burns below in the Salmon River Canyon.

The Salmon Mountains are a sub-mountain range within the Klamath Mountains system. The Klamath system are of the Pacific Coast Ranges series of mountain range systems that stretch along the West Coast of North America.

The Salmon range is within sections of the Klamath National Forest, Shasta-Trinity National Forest, and Six Rivers National Forest and includes portions of the Trinity Alps Wilderness Area, Russian Wilderness Area, and Marble Mountain Wilderness Area.

The Yurok and Hoopa Valley Indian Reservations are to the west. California State Route 299 runs along the south of the range.

== Ecology ==
Ecoregion

The Salmon Mountains are within the Klamath-Siskiyou forests — Klamath Mountains ecoregion, which is part of the Temperate coniferous forests biome.

Flora

Plant communities in the range include:

- California mixed evergreen forest
- Cedar hemlock douglas-fir forest

== See also ==
- List of mountain ranges of California
- Index: Klamath Mountains System
