= Marble Mountain Wilderness =

Protected wilderness area in California, United States

- IUCN category Ib (wilderness area)
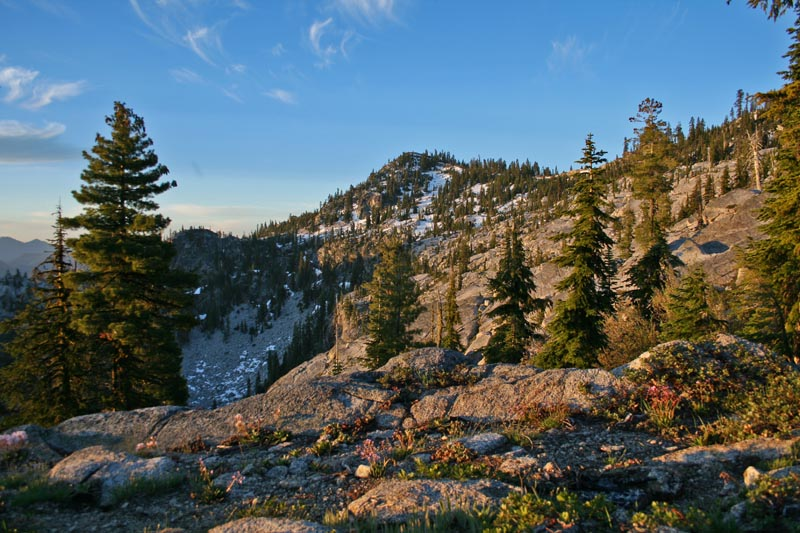
- English Peak in the wilderness

- Location within California Location within the United States
- Interactive map of Marble Mountain Wilderness
- Location: Klamath National Forest, Siskiyou County, northern California
- Nearest city: Yreka, California
- Coordinates: 41°29′24″N 123°13′30″W
- Area: 241,744 acres (978.30 km^{2})
- Established: 1964
- Governing body: U.S. Forest Service

The Marble Mountain Wilderness is a 241,744-acre (978.30 km^{2}) wilderness area located 60 miles (97 km) southwest of Yreka, California, in the United States. It is managed by the United States Forest Service and is within the Klamath National Forest in Siskiyou County. The land was first set aside in April 1931 as the Marble Mountain Primitive Area, which comprised 234,957 acres (950.84 km^{2}). It was one of four areas to gain primitive status under the Forest Service's L-20 regulations that year. In 1964, it became a federally designated wilderness area when the U.S. Congress passed the Wilderness Act.

The name comes from the distinctive coloration caused by light-colored limestone along with black metamorphic rock on some peaks, giving the mountains a marbled appearance. There are at least five different rock types identified here. The wilderness is in the Klamath Mountains geomorphic province (a large area having similar features such as terrain and geology). The horseshoe-shaped Salmon Mountains are at the core of the wilderness with Marble Mountain being a north-trending spur ridge of the Salmons. The highest point in the Marbles is Boulder Peak at 8,299 feet (2,530 m).

== Flora and fauna ==
This area of high divides, deep canyons and perennial mountain streams provides habitat for a wide variety of plant and animal life. With more than 7,000 feet (2,100 m) of vertical relief, soils from several rock types, and abundant rain and snowfall, the diversity of ecosystems is unequaled anywhere else in the country.

The wilderness contains a number of isolated stands of locally rare conifers. For example, the subalpine fir grows along the granite moraines at the head of watersheds above 6,000 feet (1,800 m) in open areas surrounding lakes and meadows, in the Sky High Lakes Basin, in Shelly Meadow along the Pacific Crest Trail and in the Deep Lake area. All of the subalpine fir groves in northwest California are more than 50 miles (80 km) from the next closest subalpine fir stand, which is in southern Oregon on Mount Ashland. In addition, the headwaters of the Salmon River in the wilderness also hold a relict stand of Pacific silver fir, which is the southernmost stand in the range of the species.

Common wildlife include the black-tailed deer and black bear. Less commonly seen species are badger and wolverine. Bird species include the great gray owl and northern goshawk, and also the peregrine falcon and bald eagle, both of which have been removed (August 2007 and August 1999, respectively) from the federal threatened/endangered species list. Fish species include summer steelhead and a spring run of king salmon in Wooley Creek, as well as resident rainbow trout in other streams in the wilderness.

There are several rare wildflowers that are adapted to serpentine soils of the Marble Mountain Wilderness and surrounding area. These include crested cinquefoil or crested potentilla (Potentilla cristae), Siskiyou fireweed (Epilobium siskiyouense), and McDonald's rock cress (Arabis mcdonaldiana), a perennial found in conifer forests of California and Oregon. McDonald's rockcress is both state-listed (1979) and federally listed (1978) as endangered.

== Recreation ==
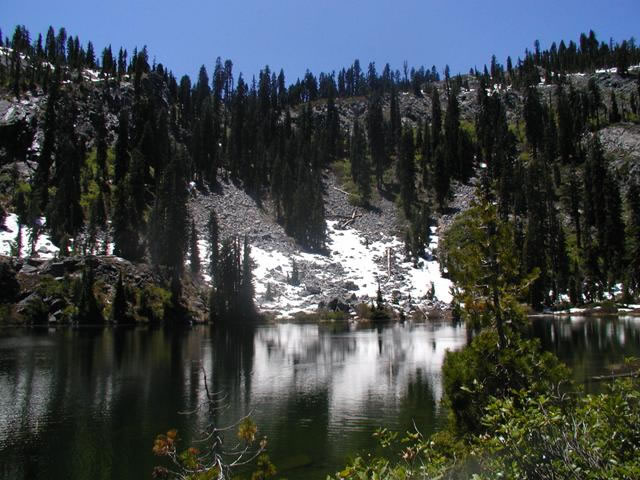
Snowcapped ridges surrounding Cuddihy Lakes, Marble Mountains Wilderness Area, CA

With 89 lakes and two major Wild and Scenic river systems-Wooley Creek and the North Fork Salmon River, as well as 32 miles (51 km) of the Pacific Crest Trail, there are many recreation opportunities. Elevations range from 400 to 8,299 feet (122 to 2,530 m); the wilderness has highly variable terrain with low-elevation canyons and high ridges such as the 22-mile (35 km)-long English Peak ridge.

Popular activities include fishing, backpacking and cross-country skiing.

There are also numerous caves within this wilderness, accessible to prepared spelunkers. They all feature stalactites and other flowstone formations, and are accessible mostly by vertical drops. Due to the hidden nature of most of the cave mouths, caving is not regulated, though the Forest Service and National Speleological Society request only experienced cavers attempt to access these dangerous caves. Signs at the trail heads that access the Marble Rim warn of white nose syndrome. One of the deepest caves in the continental US is located in the wilderness, Bigfoot Cave.

There are several national forest campgrounds outside the boundary and one camp inside the wilderness near Wooley Creek, named after Anthony Milne, who was a miner in the area around 1885.
