= Six Rivers National Forest =

National forest in California, USA

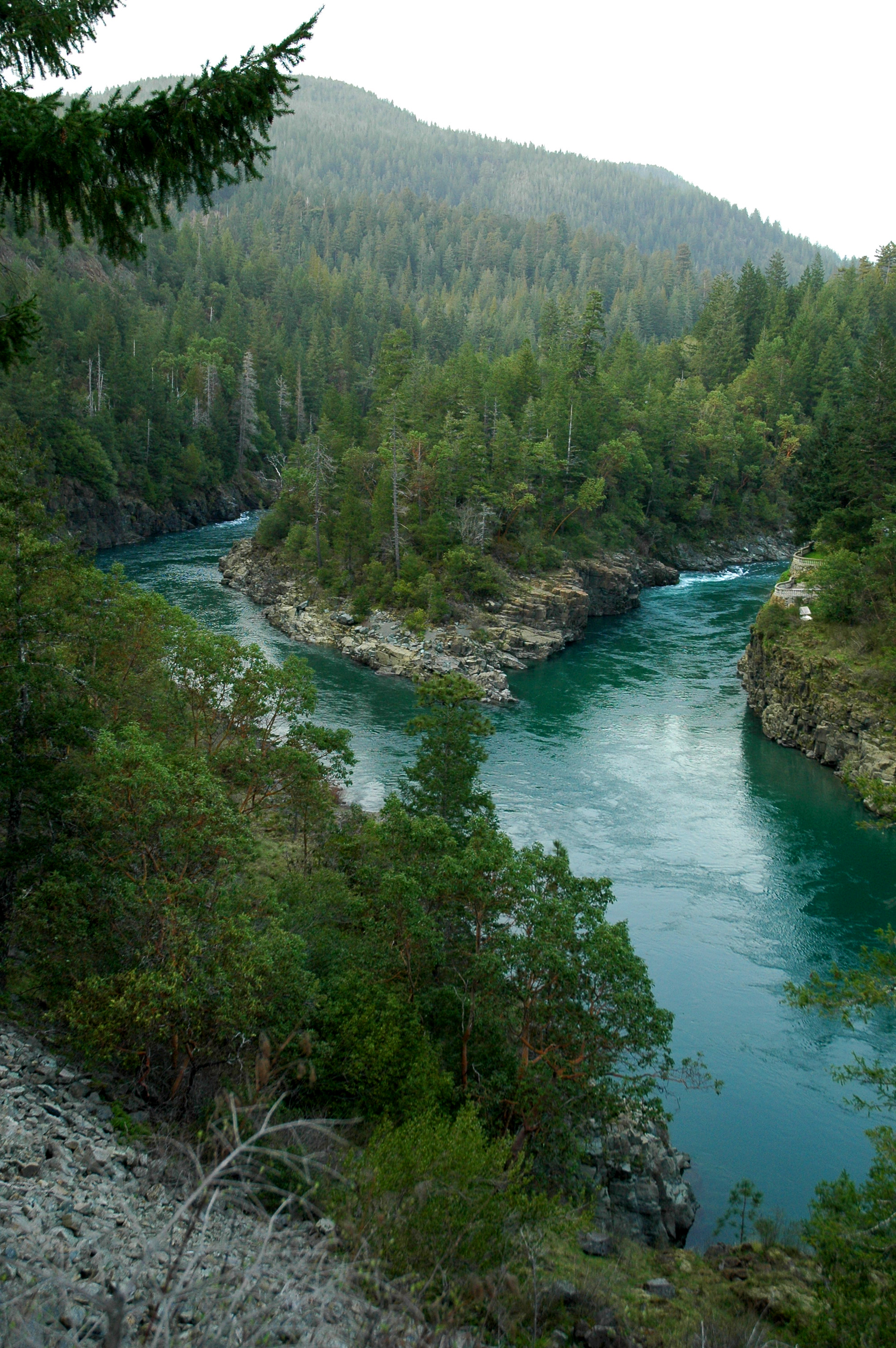
- Interactive map of Six Rivers National Forest
- Location: Northwest California, US
- Nearest city: Crescent City, California
- Coordinates: 41°46′40″N 124°01′00″W
- Area: 957,590 acres (3,875.2 km^{2})
- Established: 1947
- Governing body: U.S. Forest Service
- Website: Six Rivers National Forest

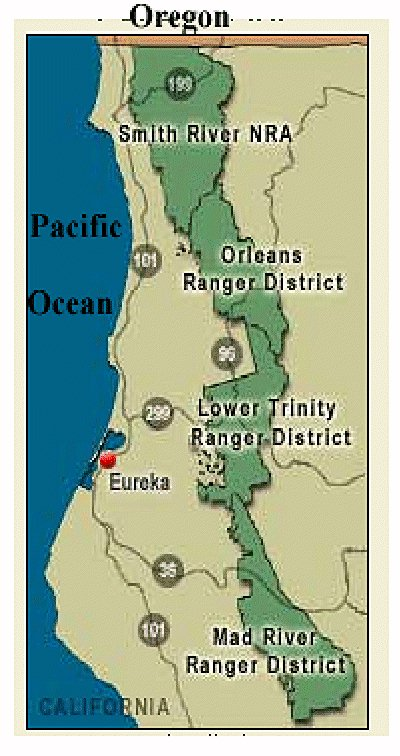

The Six Rivers National Forest is a U.S. National Forest located in the northwestern corner of California.

== History ==
It was established on June 3, 1947 by U.S. President Harry S. Truman from portions of Klamath, Siskiyou and Trinity National Forests. It expands over one million acres (1,600 sq mi) of land with a variety of ecosystems and 137,000 acres (55,000 ha) of old growth forest.

It lies in forestland areas in portions of the four counties of Del Norte, Humboldt, Trinity, and Siskiyou counties. The forest is named after the Eel, Van Duzen, Klamath, Trinity, Mad, and Smith Rivers, which flows through or near the forest's boundaries.

The forest has 366 mi (589 km) of wild and scenic rivers, six distinct botanical areas, and public-use areas for camping, hiking, and fishing. The northernmost section of the forest is known as the Smith River National Recreation Area. Forest headquarters are located in Eureka, California. There are ranger district offices in Bridgeville, Gasquet, Orleans, and Willow Creek.

Its old-growth forests include Coast Douglas-fir (Pseudotsuga menziesii var. menziesii), Tanoak (Notholithocarpus densiflorus), Pacific madrone (Arbutus menziesii), and White Fir (Abies concolor).

== Wilderness areas ==
There are five designated wilderness areas in Six Rivers National Forest that are part of the National Wilderness Preservation System. Two of them lie mostly in other National Forests or on Bureau of Land Management land.

- Mount Lassic Wilderness
- North Fork Wilderness
- Siskiyou Wilderness (partly in Klamath NF)
- Trinity Alps Wilderness (mostly in Trinity NF; partly in Shasta NF, Klamath NF, or on BLM land)
- Yolla Bolly-Middle Eel Wilderness (mostly in Mendocino NF; partly in Trinity NF, or BLM land)

== Important events ==
- The Patterson-Gimlin film, claimed to be a recording of a Bigfoot, was filmed in this national forest.
- Lyng v. Northwest Indian Cemetery Protective Association, a 1988 US Supreme Court decision, concerned land in the forest claimed as sacred by several local Native American tribes.
- In 1947, Jose Garcia, father of then 5-year-old Jerry Garcia, slipped on a rock while fly fishing in the Trinity River and drowned. Jerry claimed to have witnessed this happen, though others familiar with the family assert that he did not.

== See also ==
- List of national forests of the United States
- Shasta-Trinity National Forest
- Mendocino National Forest
- Klamath National Forest
- Rogue River-Siskiyou National Forest
