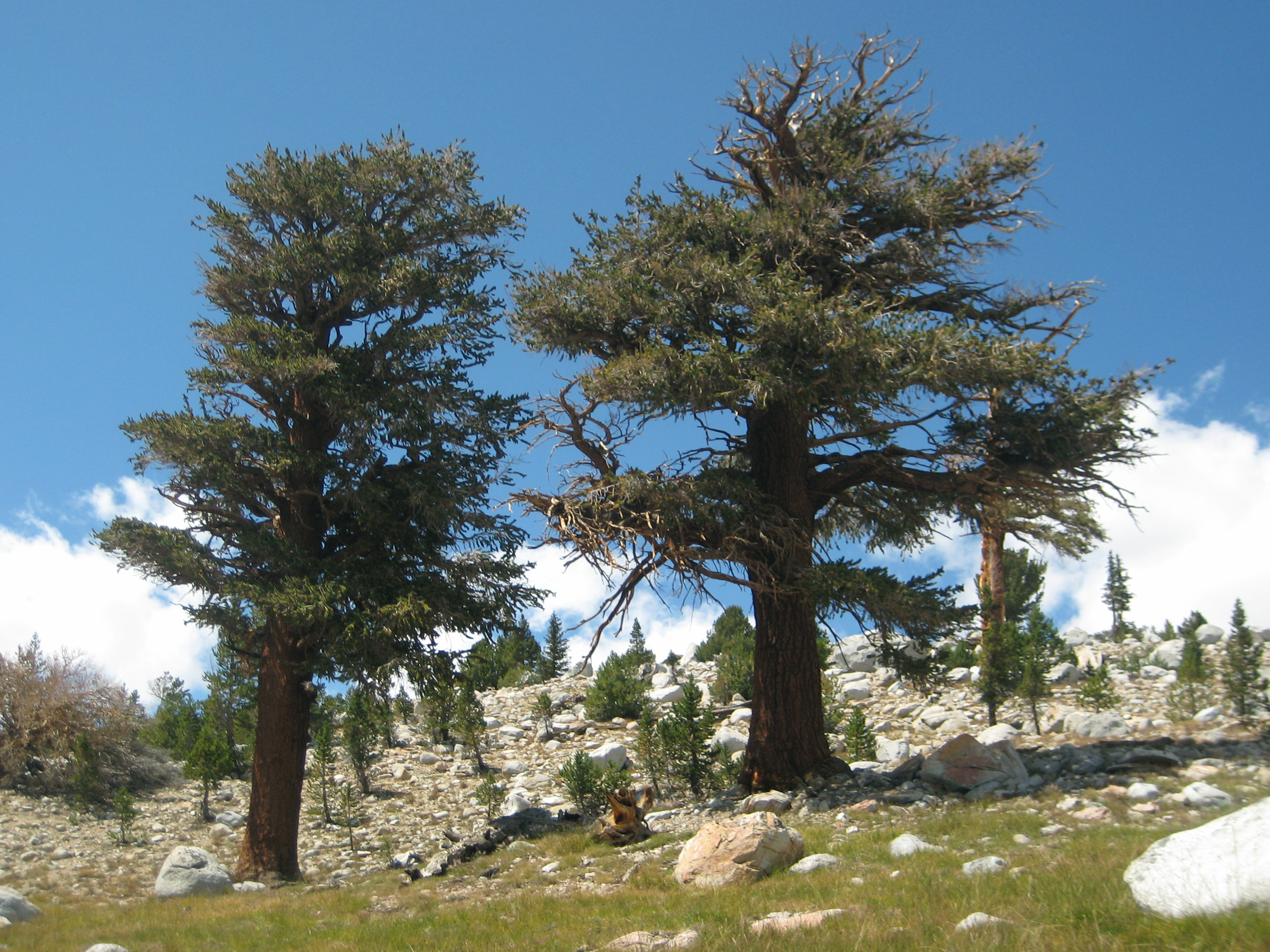
- John Muir Trail, between Forester Pass and Wallace Creek, southern Sierra Nevada

Conservation status
- Near Threatened (IUCN 3.1)

- Apparently Secure (NatureServe)

Scientific classification
- Kingdom: Plantae
- Clade: Tracheophytes
- Clade: Gymnosperms
- Division: Pinophyta
- Class: Pinopsida
- Order: Pinales
- Family: Pinaceae
- Genus: Pinus
- Subgenus: P. subg. Strobus
- Section: P. sect. Parrya
- Subsection: P. subsect. Balfourianae
- Species: P. balfouriana

Binomial name
- Pinus balfouriana Balf., 1853
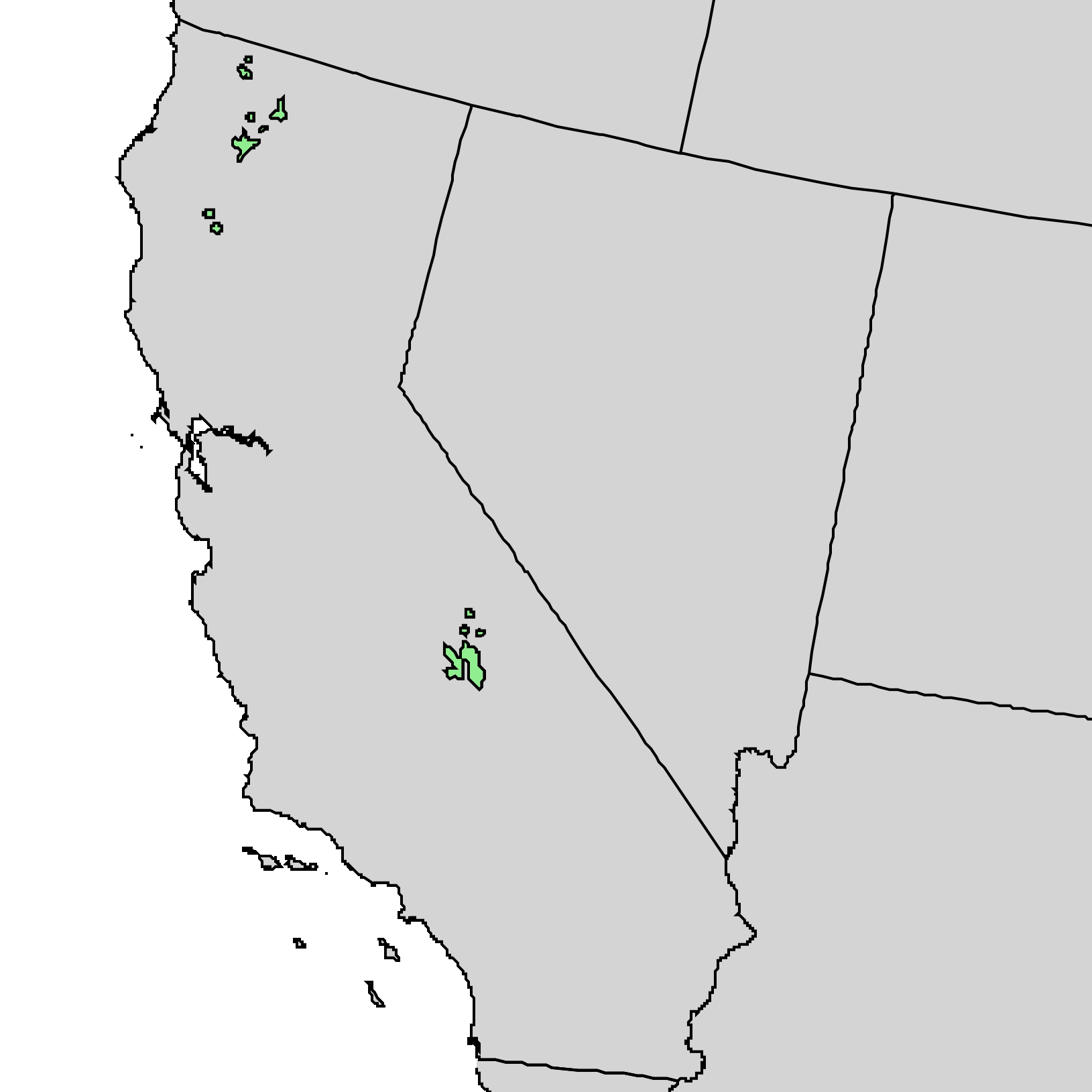
- Natural range of Pinus balfouriana

Synonyms
- List: Pinus balfouriana subsp. austrina R.J.Mastrog. & J.D.Mastrog. (1980); Pinus balfouriana var. austrina (R.J.Mastrog. & J.D.Mastrog.) Silba (1984)

= Pinus balfouriana =

Foxtail pine

Californian endemic species of pine tree

Pinus balfouriana, the foxtail pine, is a rare high-elevation pine that is endemic to California, United States. One of three species of bristlecone pines (family Pinaceae, genus Pinus, subsection Balfourianae), P. balfouriana is closely related to the Great Basin and Rocky Mountain bristlecone pines. Although these three species can hybridize in cultivation, their ranges do not overlap, and hybridization has not been demonstrated in wild populations.

== Description ==
P. balfouriana grows up to 22 m (70 ft) tall, with a trunk up to 2.6 m (9 ft) in diameter. Its leaves are needle-like, in bundles of five, and 1.5–4 cm (1/2–1 1/2 in) long, deep glossy green on the outer face, and white on the inner faces; they persist for 10–30 years. The cones are 6–11 cm (2 1/2–4 1/2 in) long, dark purple ripening red-brown, with soft, flexible scales each with a 1-millimeter (1/16-inch) central prickle.

== Distribution ==
P. balfouriana is a tree line species, with two subspecies currently recognized. The two subspecies occur in two geographically distinct populations. P. balfouriana var. balfouriana occurs in the subalpine forest at an elevation of 1,950–2,750 m (6,400–9,020 ft) in the Klamath Mountains, while P. balfouriana var. austrina is found in pure or nearly pure stands at an elevation of 2,750–3,650 m (9,020–11,980 ft) in the southern Sierra Nevada, around the headwaters of the Kings, Kern and Kaweah Rivers (in the area around Sequoia and Kings Canyon National Parks).

Image	Subspecies	Distribution
	Pinus balfouriana var. balfouriana	southern Klamath Mountains
	Pinus balfouriana var. austrina	the southern Sierra Nevada

== Age ==
P. balfouriana may live up to 3000 years in the Sierra Nevada, although the oldest reliably dated living specimen is 2110 years. In the Klamath Mountains, ages are only known to about 1000 years.

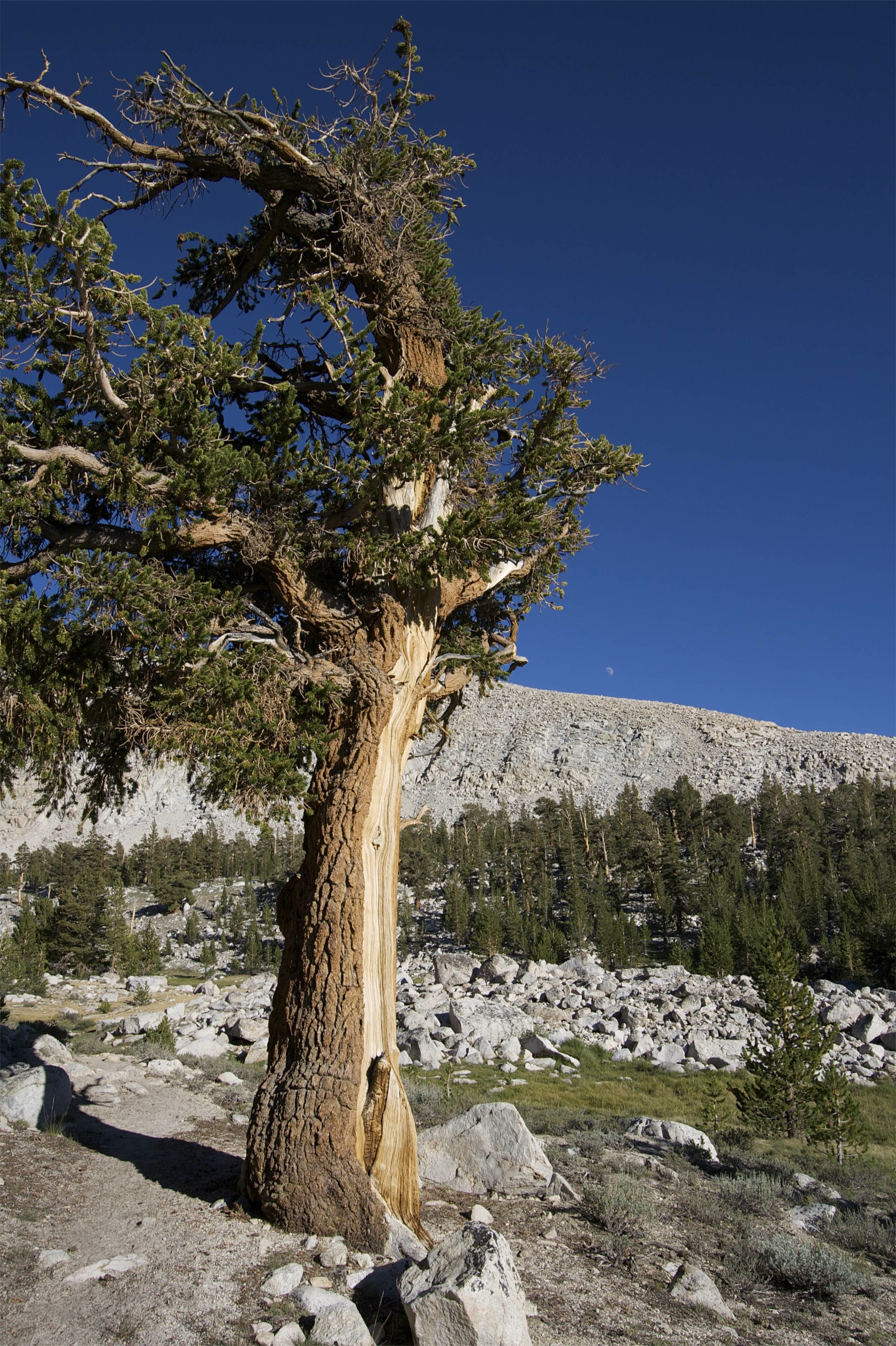
A Foxtail Pine in the southern Sierra Nevada

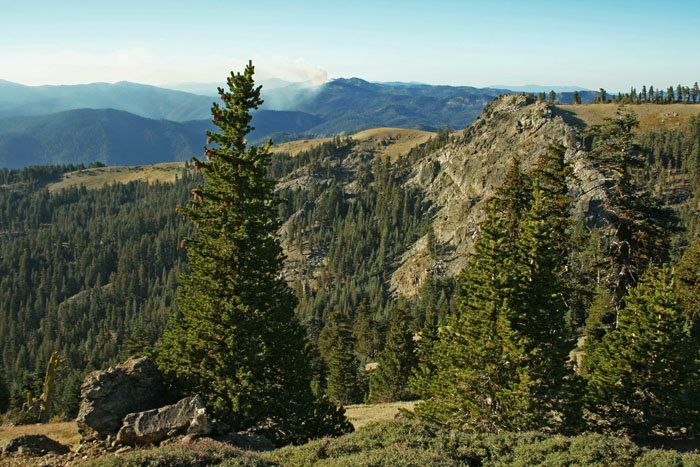
In the Yolla Bolly-Middle Eel Wilderness.
