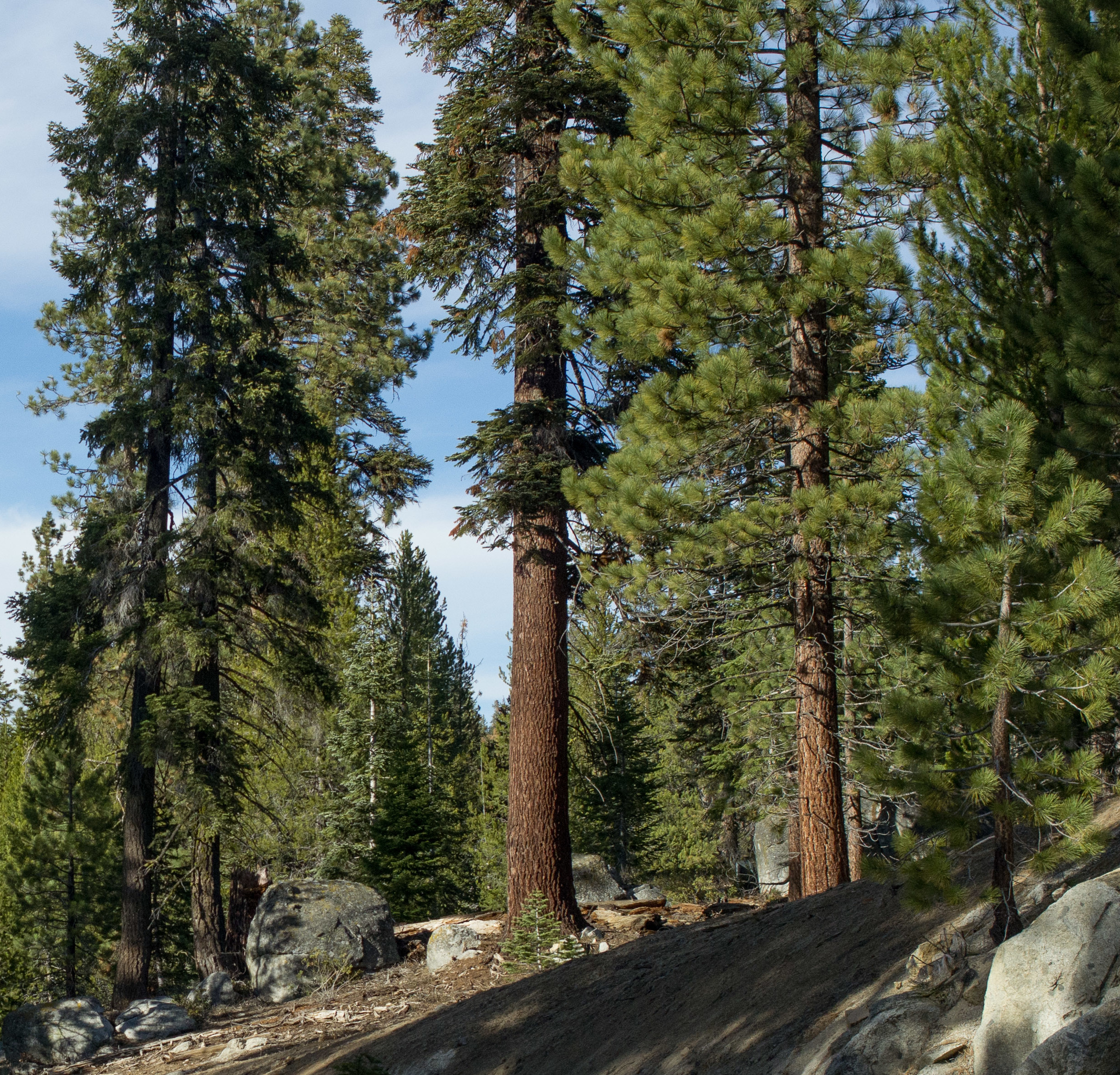
- Red fir forest, Giant Sequoia National Monument

Conservation status
- Least Concern (IUCN 3.1)

Scientific classification
- Kingdom: Plantae
- Clade: Tracheophytes
- Clade: Gymnosperms
- Division: Pinophyta
- Class: Pinopsida
- Order: Pinales
- Family: Pinaceae
- Genus: Abies
- Section: Abies sect. Nobilis
- Species: A. magnifica

Binomial name
- Abies magnifica A.Murray bis
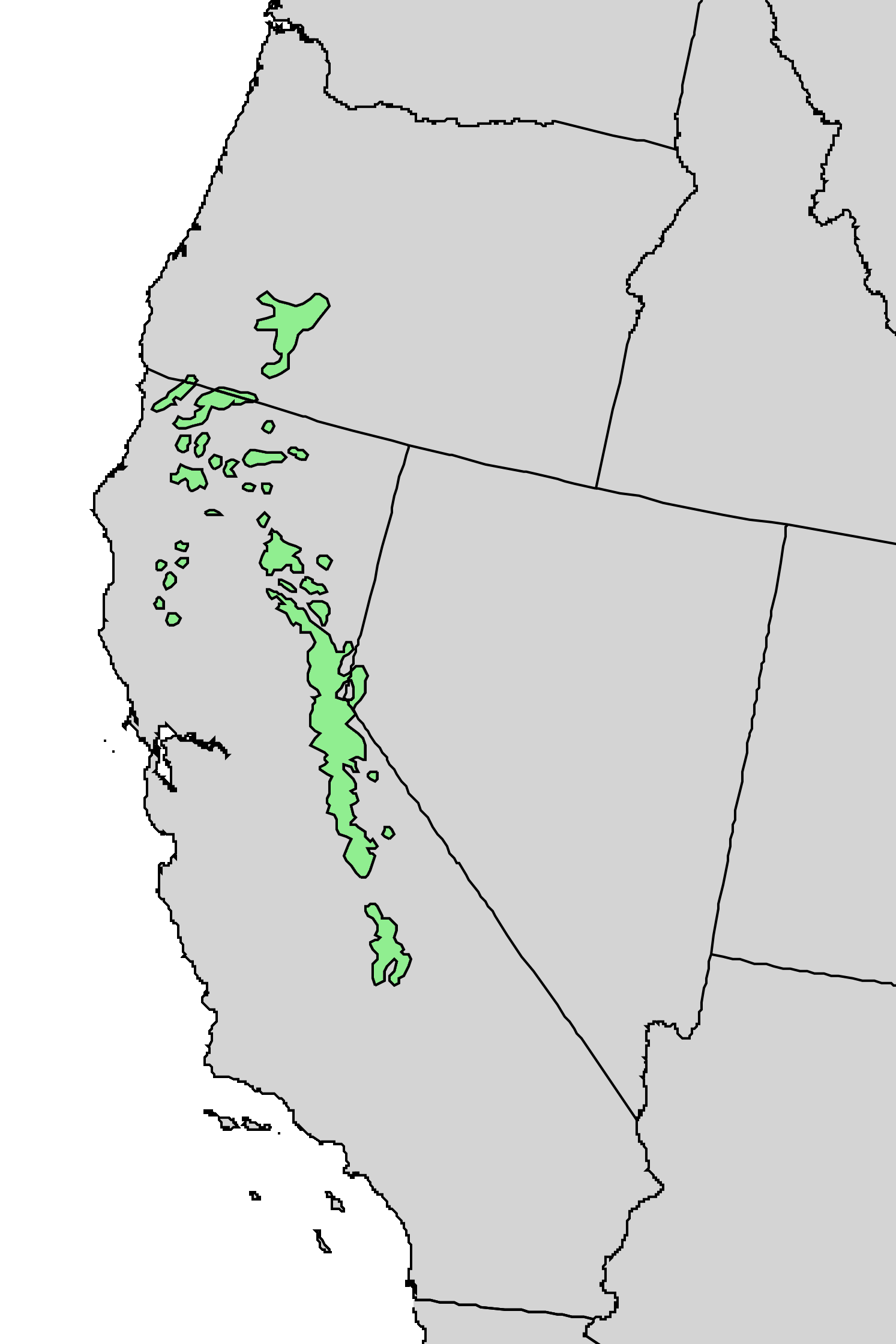
- Natural range of Abies magnifica

= Abies magnifica =

Species of tree found in North America

Abies magnifica, the red fir or silvertip fir, is a western North American fir, native to the mountains of southwest Oregon and California in the United States. It is a high-elevation tree, typically occurring at 1,400–2,700 metres (4,600–8,900 ft) elevation, though only rarely reaching tree line. The name red fir derives from the bark color of old trees.

== Description ==
Abies magnifica is a large evergreen tree typically up to 40–60 metres (130–200 ft) tall and 2 m (6 ft 7 in) trunk diameter, rarely to 76.5 m (251 ft) tall and 3 m (9 ft 10 in) diameter, with a narrow conic crown. The bark on young trees is smooth, grey, and has resin blisters, becoming orange-red, rough and fissured on old trees. The leaves are needle-like, 2–3.5 centimetres (3/4–1 1/2 in) long, glaucous blue-green above and below with strong stomatal bands, and an acute tip. They are arranged spirally on the shoot, but twisted slightly S-shaped to be upcurved above the shoot.

The cones are erect, 9–21 cm (3 1/2–8 1/4 in) long, yellow-green (occasionally purple), ripening brown and disintegrating to release the winged seeds in fall.

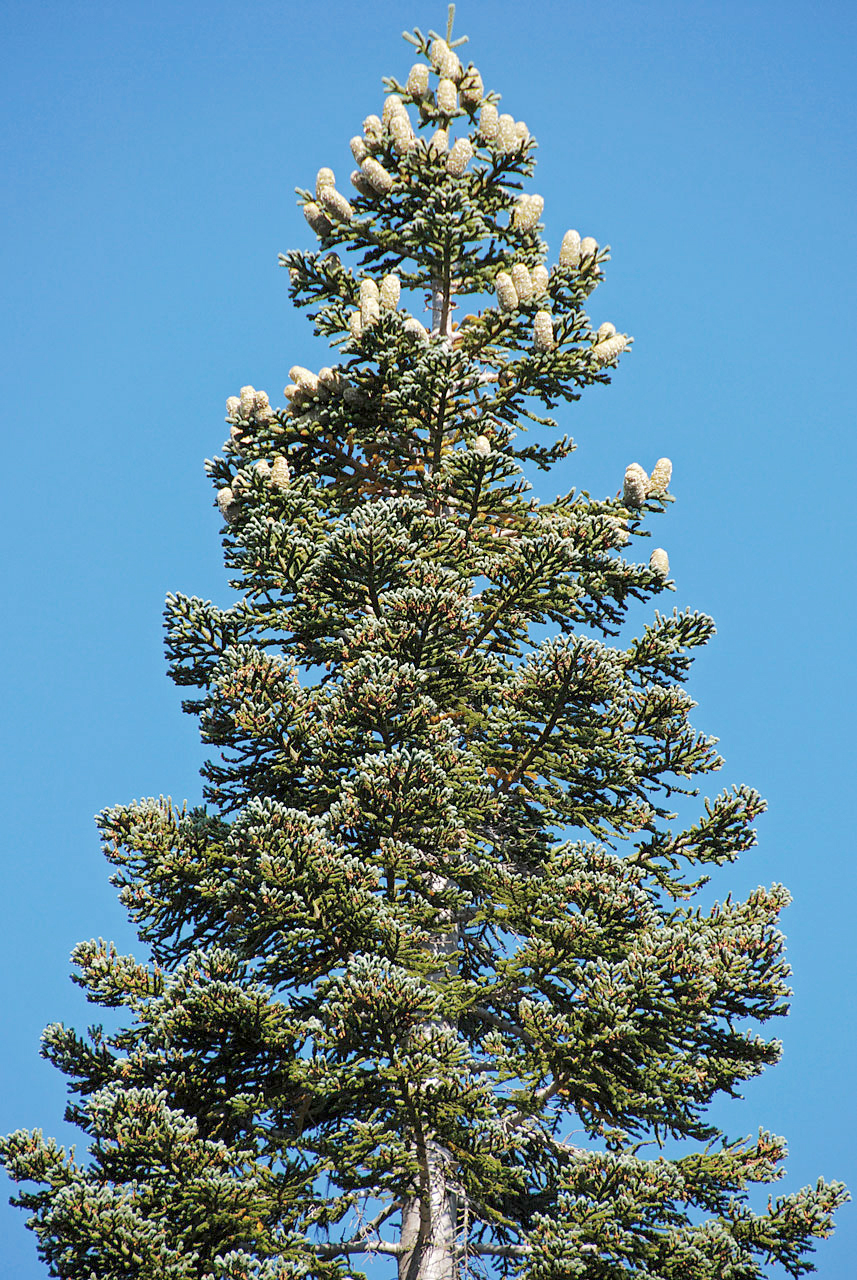
Abies magnifica: Cones stand upright on branches.

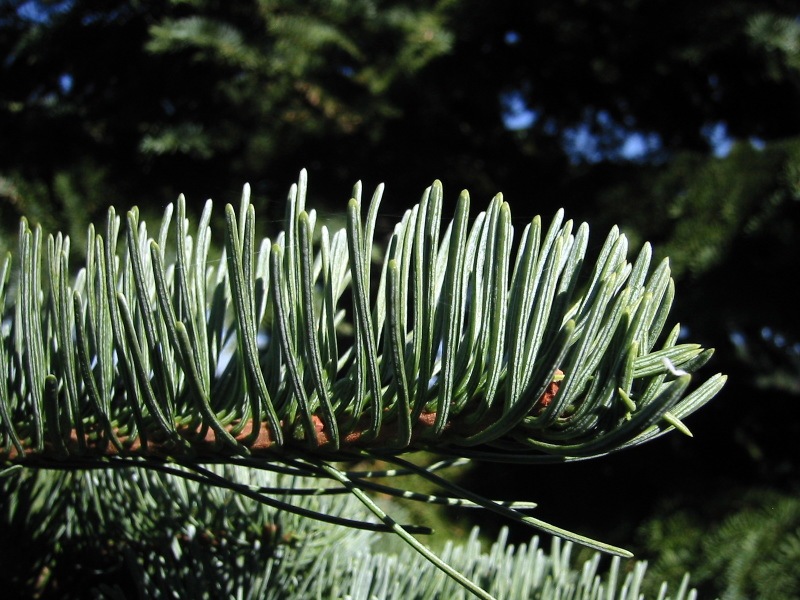
Abies magnifica: Needle-like leaves bend upward.

=== Varieties ===
There are three varieties:

Image	Scientific name	Description	Distribution
	Abies magnifica var. magnifica, red fir	cones 14–21 cm (5 1/2–8 1/4 in) long, bract scales short, not visible on the closed cones.	Range, primarily in the Sierra Nevada.
	Abies magnifica var. shastensis Lemmon, Shasta red fir	cones 14–21 cm (5 1/2–8 1/4 in) long, bract scales longer, visible on the closed cone; bark 10–15 cm (4–6 in) thick.	The northwest of the species' range, in southwest Oregon and Shasta, Siskiyou and Trinity Counties in northwest California.
	Abies magnifica var. critchfieldii Lanner	Also having long bracts, and additionally have smaller cones, 9–15 cm (3 1/2–6 in) long.	the eastern slopes of southern Sierra Nevada

=== Related ===
Red fir is very closely related to Abies procera (noble fir), which replaces it further north in the Cascade Range. They are best distinguished by the leaves; noble fir leaves have a groove along the midrib on the upper side, while red fir does not show this. Red fir also tends to have the leaves less closely packed, with the shoot bark visible between the leaves, whereas the shoot is largely hidden in noble fir. Shasta red fir hybridizes with noble fir, with which it is both chemically and microscopically similar; some botanists treat the former as a natural hybrid between red and noble fir.

== First recording ==
This tree was first recorded by William Lobb on his expedition to California of 1849–1853, having been overlooked previously by David Douglas.

== Uses ==
The wood is used for general structural purposes and paper manufacture. It is also a popular Christmas tree, with a 53-foot red fir from the Humboldt–Toiyabe National Forest being used as the 2025 Capitol Christmas Tree. It is also the first ever Capitol Christmas tree selected from Nevada.

Paiute peoples used the foliage of Shasta red fir (or perhaps noble fir) to treat coughs and colds.

== See also ==
- Sierra Nevada subalpine zone
