= Lavington =

Lavington may refer to:

== People ==
- George Lavington (1684–1762), Bishop of Exeter, England
- Lavington Glyde (1825–1890), Treasurer of South Australia
- Ralph Payne, 1st Baron Lavington (1739–1807), British politician and Governor of the Leeward Islands, sole Baron Lavington
- Leon Edward Lavington Sr. (1889–1961), Colorado State Treasurer, United States of America

== Places ==
- Lavington, New South Wales, Australia, a suburb of the city of Albury
- Lavington, British Columbia, Canada, an unincorporated community
- Lenton, Lincolnshire, sometimes known as Lavington, a village in England
- Lavington, Nairobi, Kenya, a suburb of Nairobi

== See also ==
- East Lavington, West Sussex, England
- West Lavington, West Sussex
- West Lavington, Wiltshire, England
- Market Lavington, Wiltshire
