= List of places with columnar jointed volcanics =

Polygonal stone columns

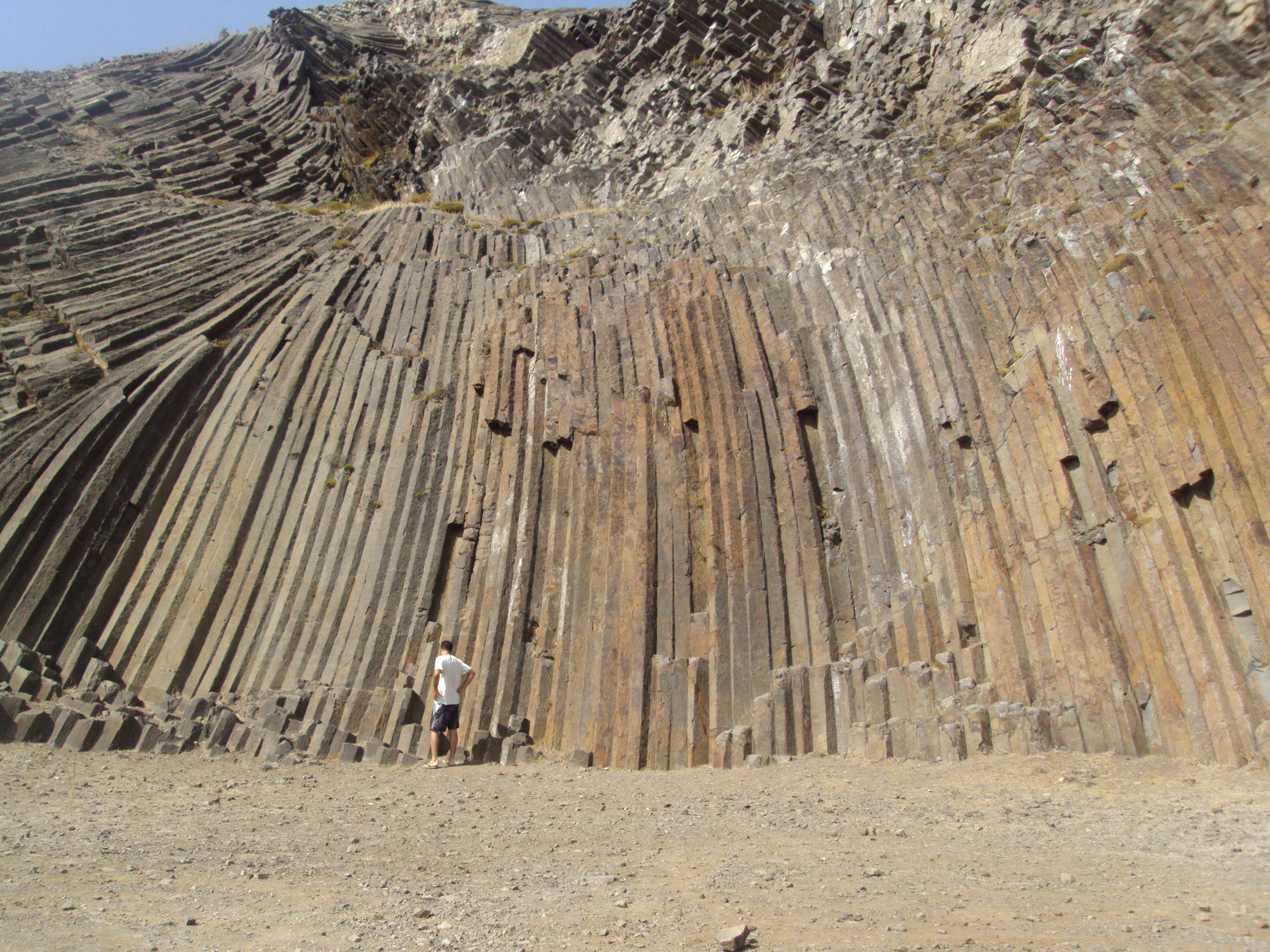
Basalt columns seen on Porto Santo Island, Portugal

Columnar jointing of volcanic rocks exists in many places on Earth. Perhaps the most famous basalt lava flow in the world is the Giant's Causeway in Northern Ireland, in which the vertical joints form polygonal columns and give the impression of having been artificially constructed.

== Notable columnar jointed volcanics ==
=== Africa ===
- Dschang quarry, Mount Bambouto, Cameroon
- Ikom Columnar Basalt in Cross River State, Nigeria
- Numan, Nigeria
- "Organ Pipes" near Twyfelfontein, Namibia
- Rochester Falls, Mauritius
- Îles de la Madeleine, Senegal
- Lalibela, Ethiopia

=== Asia ===
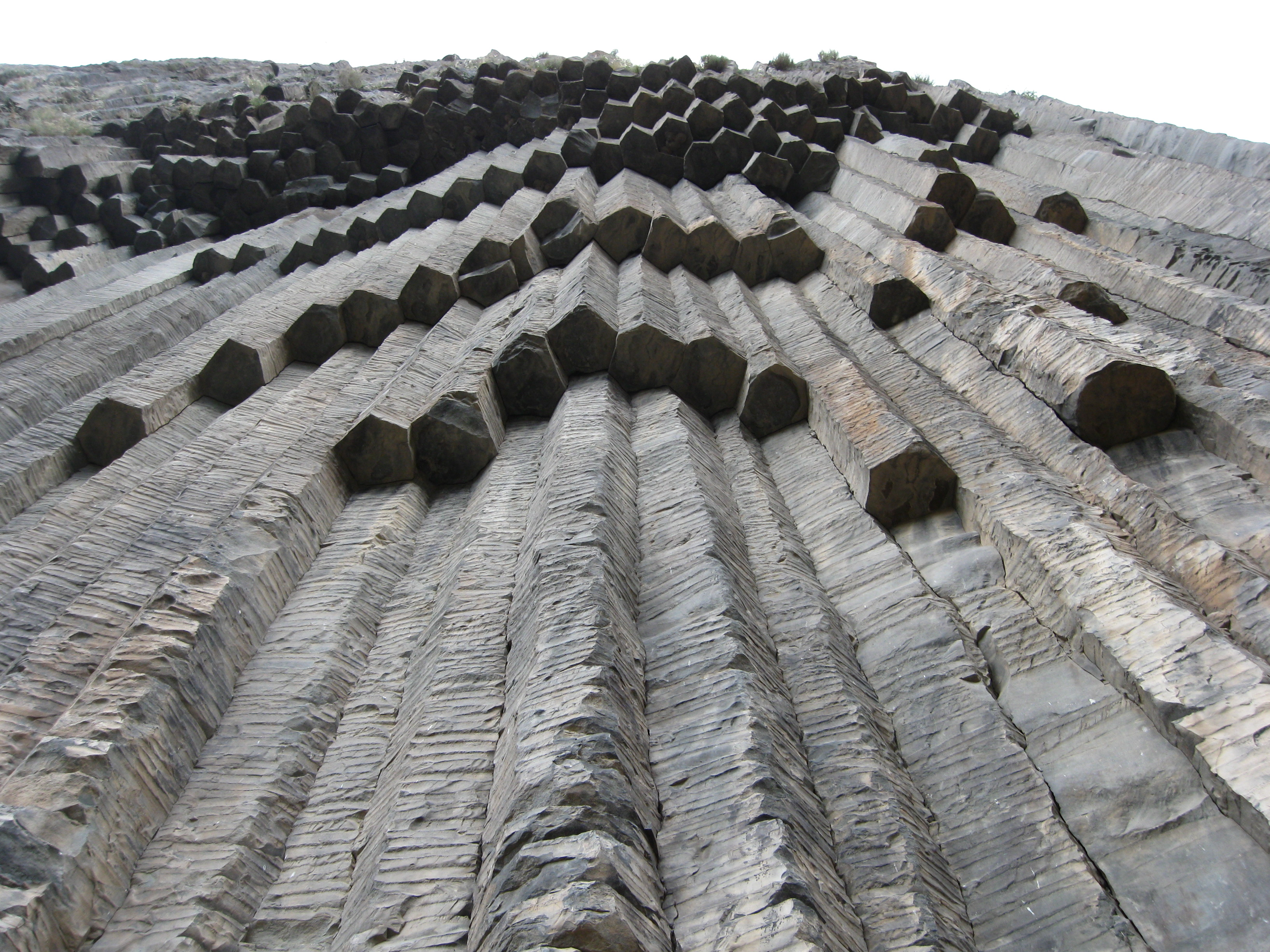
Garni Gorge, Armenia

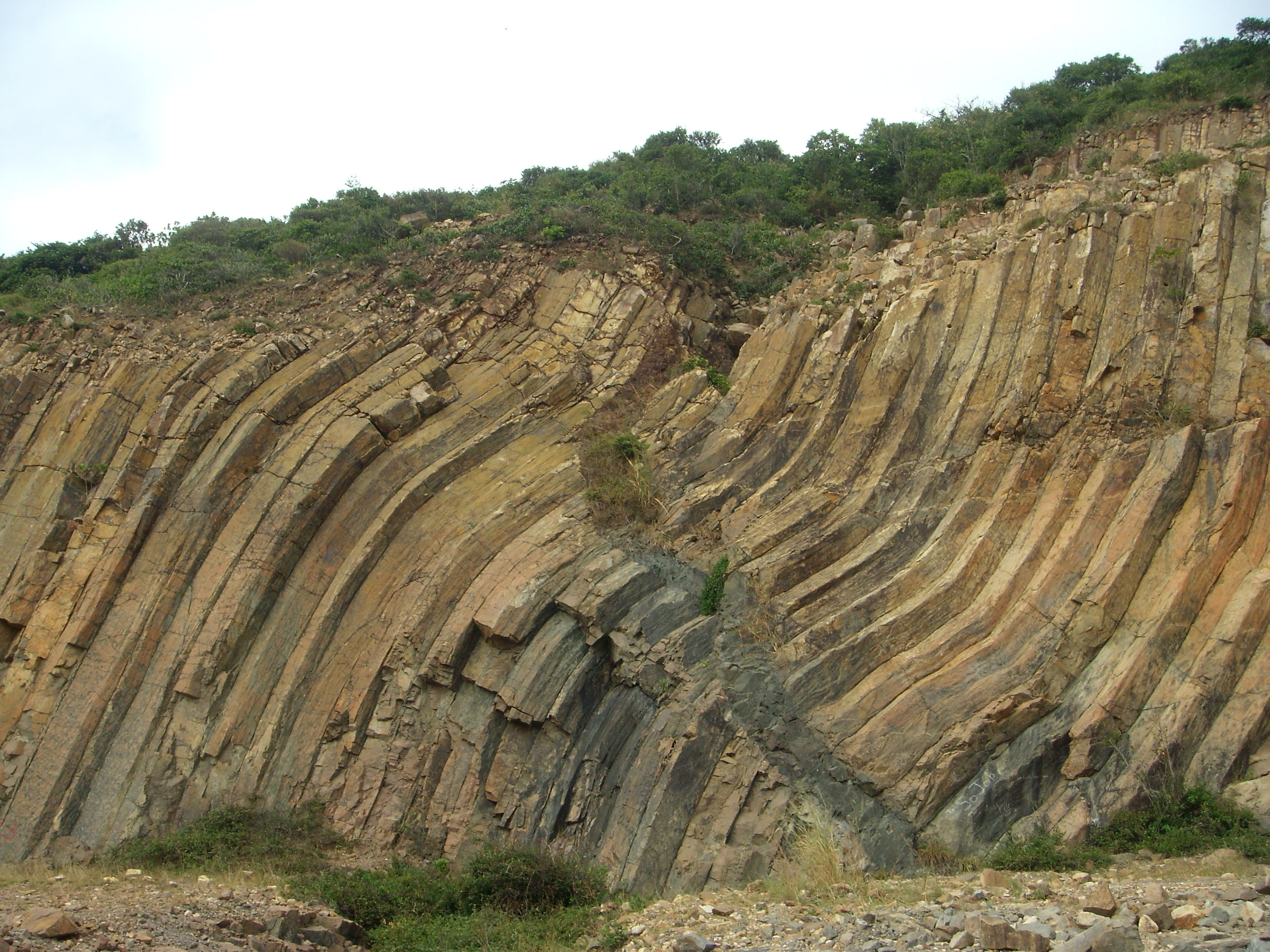
Curved columns of rhyolitic tuff at the Hong Kong High Island Reservoir

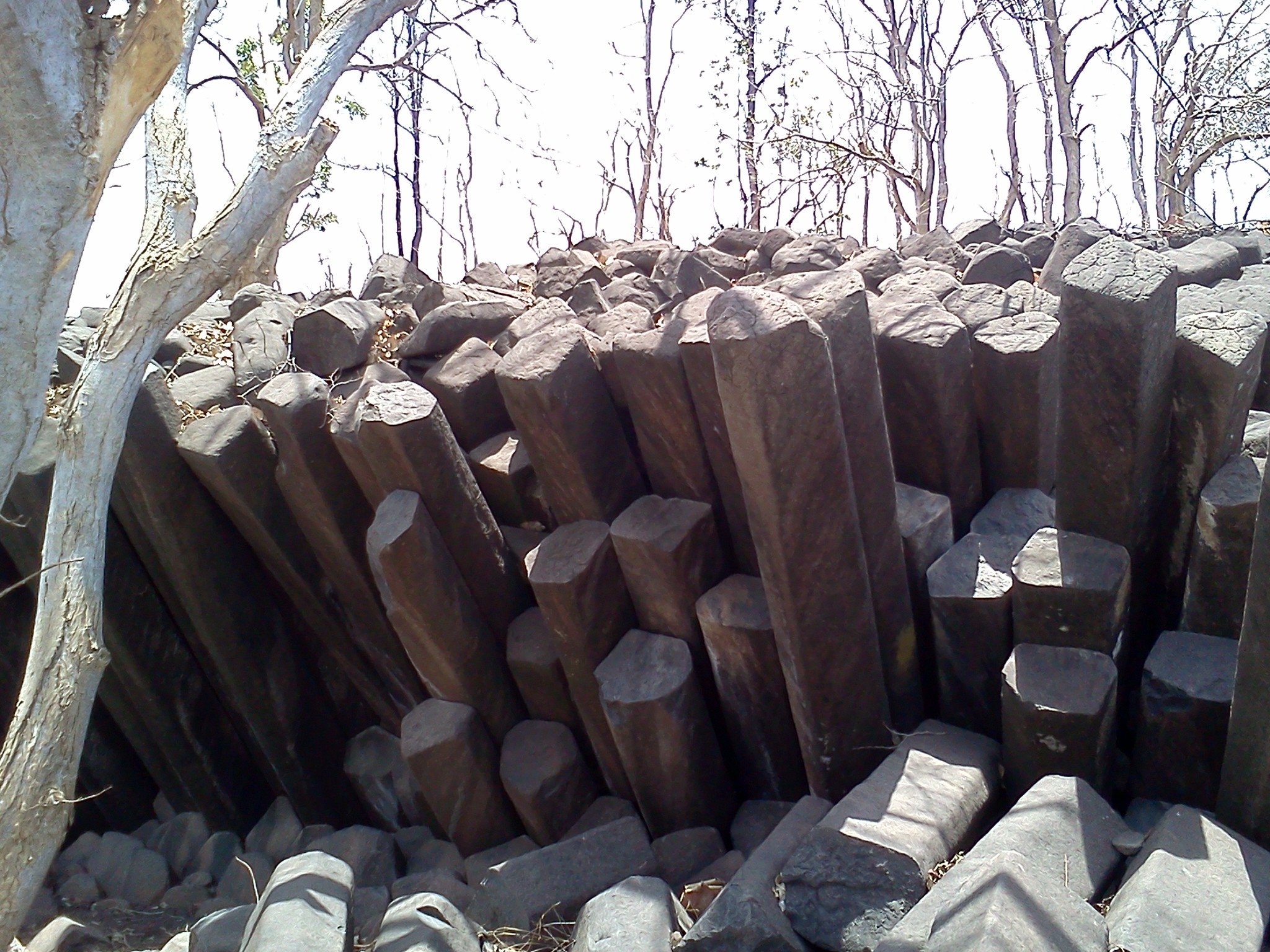
Interlocked basaltic columns at the top of Kavadia mountain at Dewas district in India.

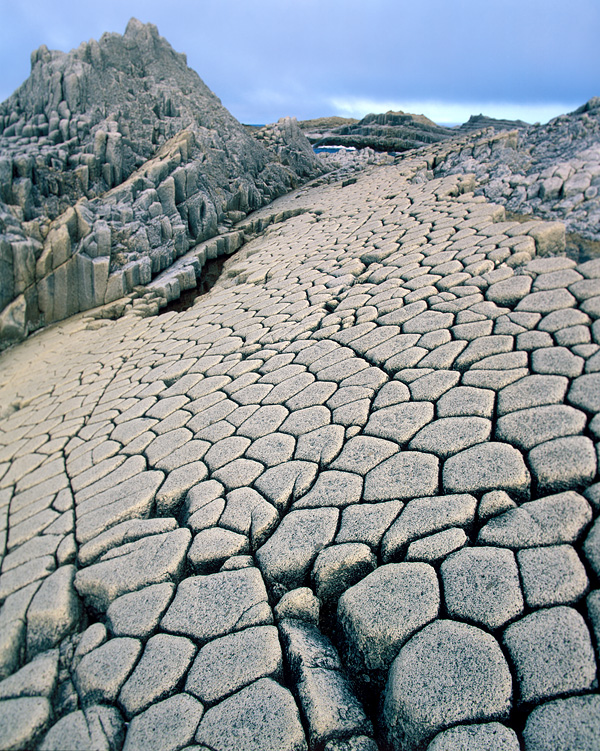
Columnar basalts at Cape Stolbchatiy, Kuril Islands, Russia

==== Armenia ====
- Garni Gorge, Armenia
- Near Saint Sarkis Cathedral, Yerevan, Armenia

==== China (mainland) ====
- Heiyuhe Columnar Joints (黑鱼河柱状节理) [Xianrenqiao (仙人桥)], Longchuan River (龙川江) & Black Fish River, Tengchong

==== Hong Kong ====
- Basalt Island area, Hong Kong; including High Island Reservoir area, Hong Kong; although the High Island Reservoir is not basalt but rhyolitic tuff, rich in potash feldspar and quartz phenocrysts.

==== India ====
In India, columnar jointed volcanic rocks are found in several places across the volcanic traps such as Deccan Traps (c. 66 million years old) in South India and Rajmahal Traps (c. 118 million years old) in Eastern India.

- Karnataka
  - St. Mary's Island near Malpe in Udupi district of Karnataka state.
- Madhya Pradesh
  - Kavadia Pahad: Forest area near Bagli & Pipari village of Dewas District in Madhya Pradesh. The rock formation is at Kavadia Pahad which is a series of seven mountain ranges.
  - Linga: 11 kilometres (6.8 mi) south of Chhindwara city.
  - near Narsinghpur in Deccan Basalts.
- Maharashtra
  - Bandivade: found at Bandivade village bear Panhala in Kolhapur district of Maharashtra.
  - Gilbert Hill in Andheri suburb of Mumbai in Maharashtra
  - Manmad
  - Muktagiri in basalt lava flows of Muktagiri section in Amravati district
- Telangana
  - Adilabad district
  - Borilalguda: Found on a small hillock inside the reserve forest of Borilalguda village in Kerameri tehsil of Komaram Bheem Asifabad district.
  - Medak district
  - Nizamabad district
  - Rangareddy district

==== Indonesia ====
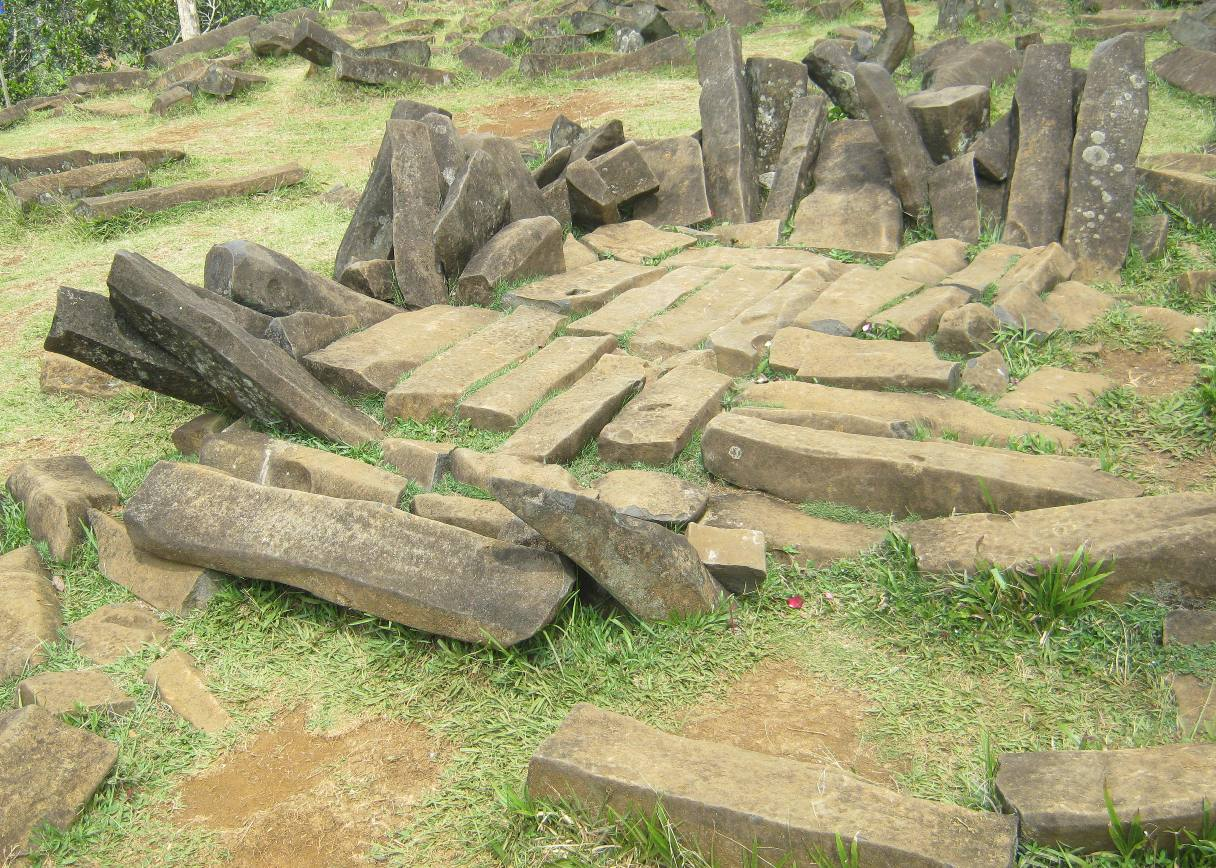
Close up view of stones atop Gunung Padang

- Gunung Padang in West Java is also a manmade archaeological site.
- Gunung Kelud in East Java has basalt columns visible south of the crater lake (Wanajay peak).

==== Iran ====
- Maku, West Azerbaijan Province
- Mount Damavand
- Sarbisheh

==== Syria ====
- Wadi al-Hawa (Hexagons River), Hexagons pool, Golan Heights, Quneitra Governorate

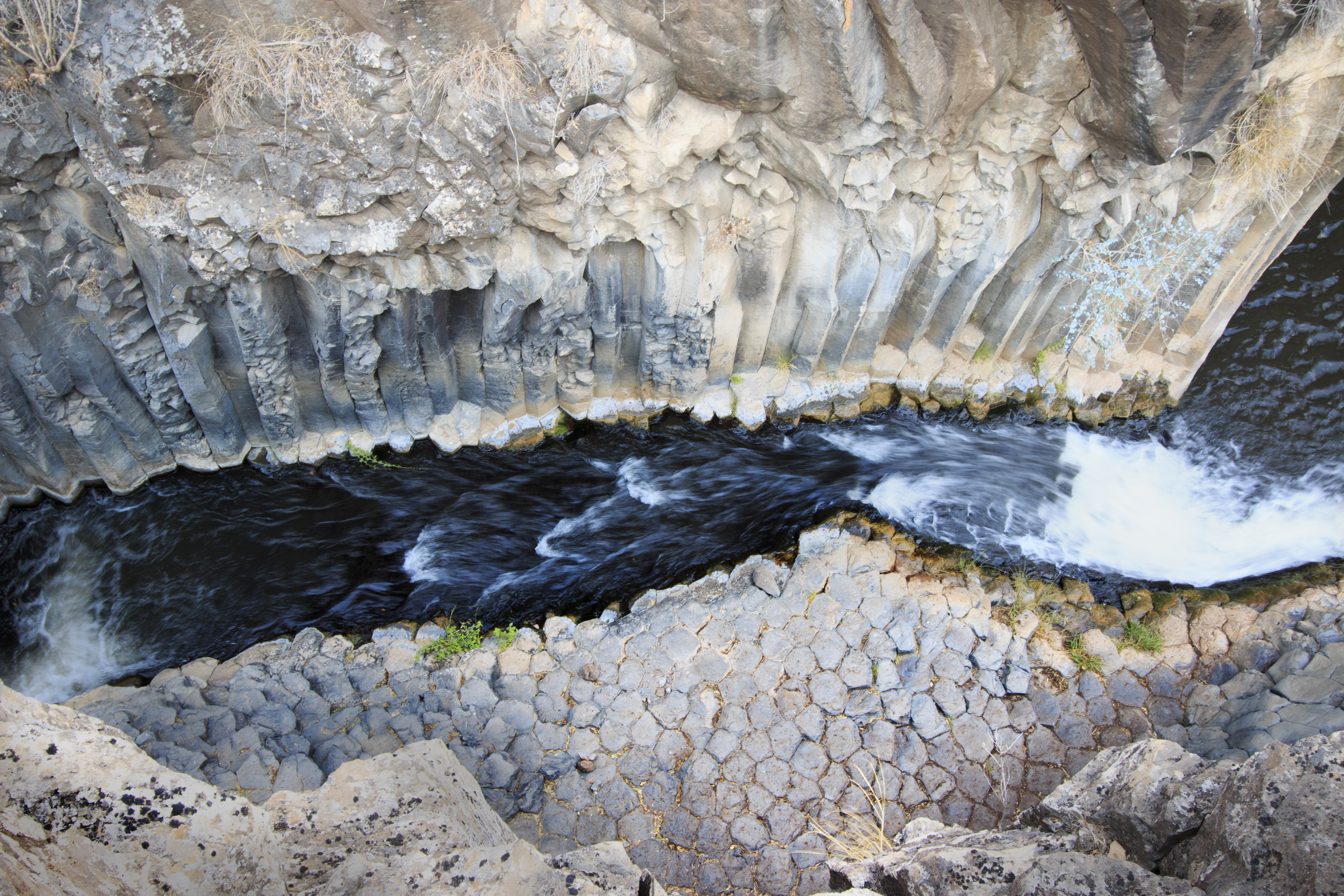
Wadi al-Hawa, with prominent hexagonal basalt columns

==== Japan ====
- Bettō-iwa, Natsudomari Peninsula
- Kawazu 7 waterfalls area, Izu Peninsula, Shizuoka
- Tōjinbō, Mikuni, Fukui
- Genbudō, Toyooka, Hyōgo
- Takachiho-kyo gorge, Takachiho, Miyazaki
- Keya no Oto, Itoshima, Fukuoka
- Tatami-ishi, Kumejima, Okinawa

==== Malaysia ====
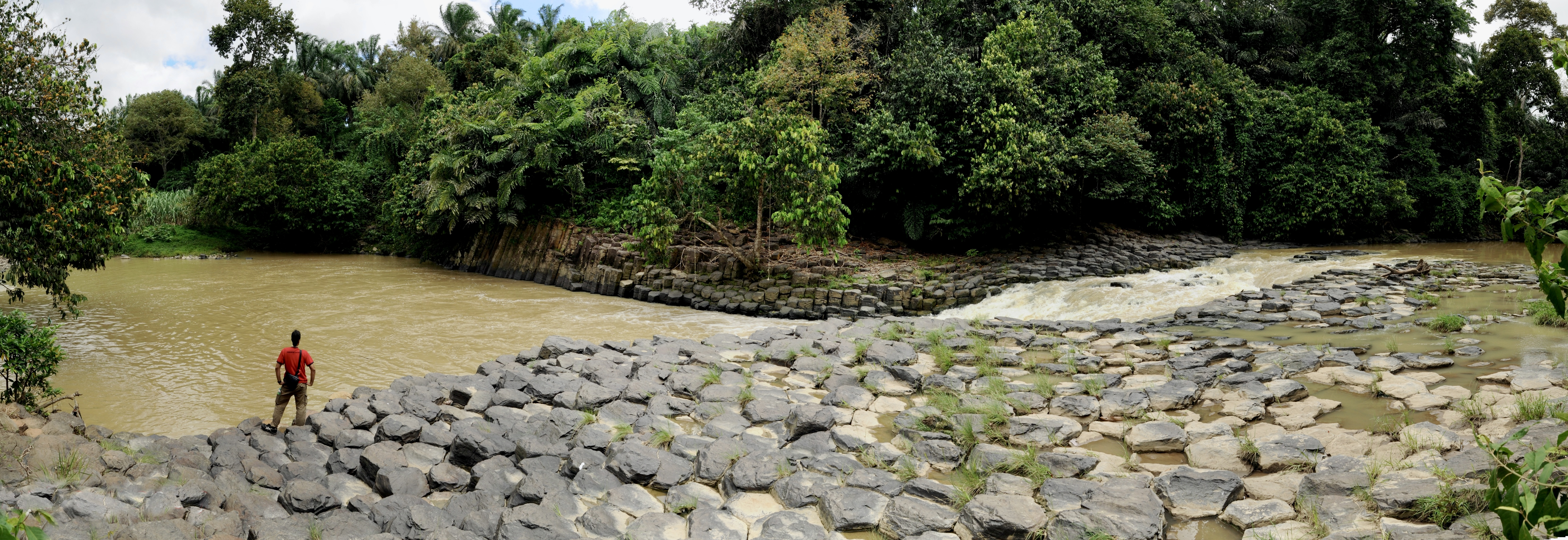
at Kg Balung Cocos, Tawau, Sabah

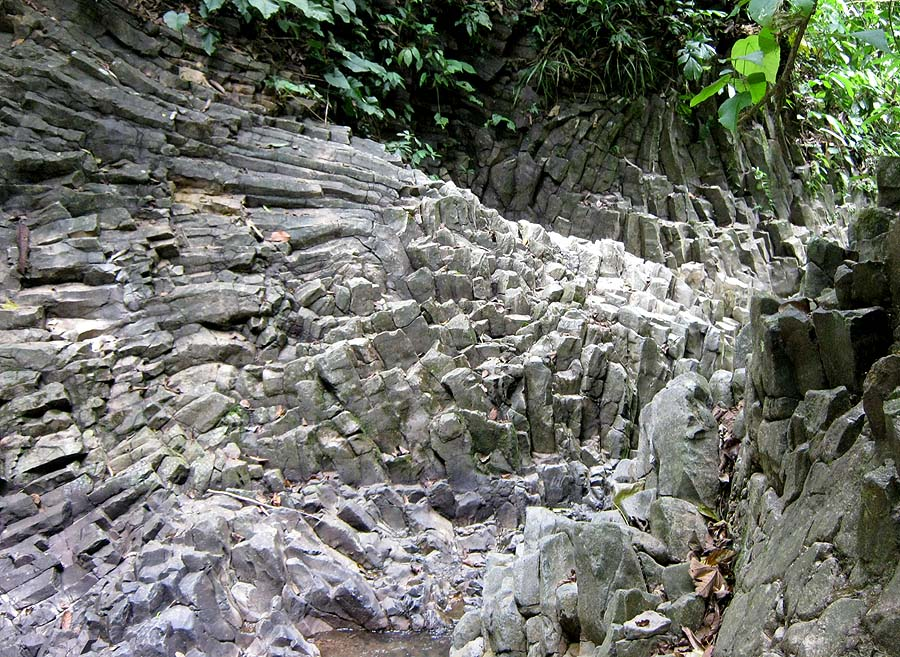
Basalt Columns exposed along a river in a remote place in Tawau, Malaysia

- In Teck Guan Cocoa Village and in Giram River, Kampung Balung Cocos Tawau, Sabah.

==== Mongolia ====
- Kharandaa Khad in Taishir district, on Zavkhan River

==== Philippines ====
- Dunsulan Falls in Mount Samat, Pilar, Bataan
- Bulingan Falls in Lamitan, Basilan

==== Russia ====
- Chukchi Peninsula in Chukotka Autonomous Okrug
- Cape Stolbchatiy, Kuril Islands, Russia

==== South Korea ====
- Jusangjeolli, Seogwipo, Jeju Island, South Korea
- Daljeon-ri Columnar Joint, Pohang, South Korea

==== Taiwan ====
- Tongpan Basalt (桶盤玄武岩石柱), Tongpan Island and Hujing Island (Table island, 虎井嶼), Penghu Islands
- The Whale Cave, on the seashore, in Penghu County

==== Thailand ====
- Buri Ram

==== Turkey ====
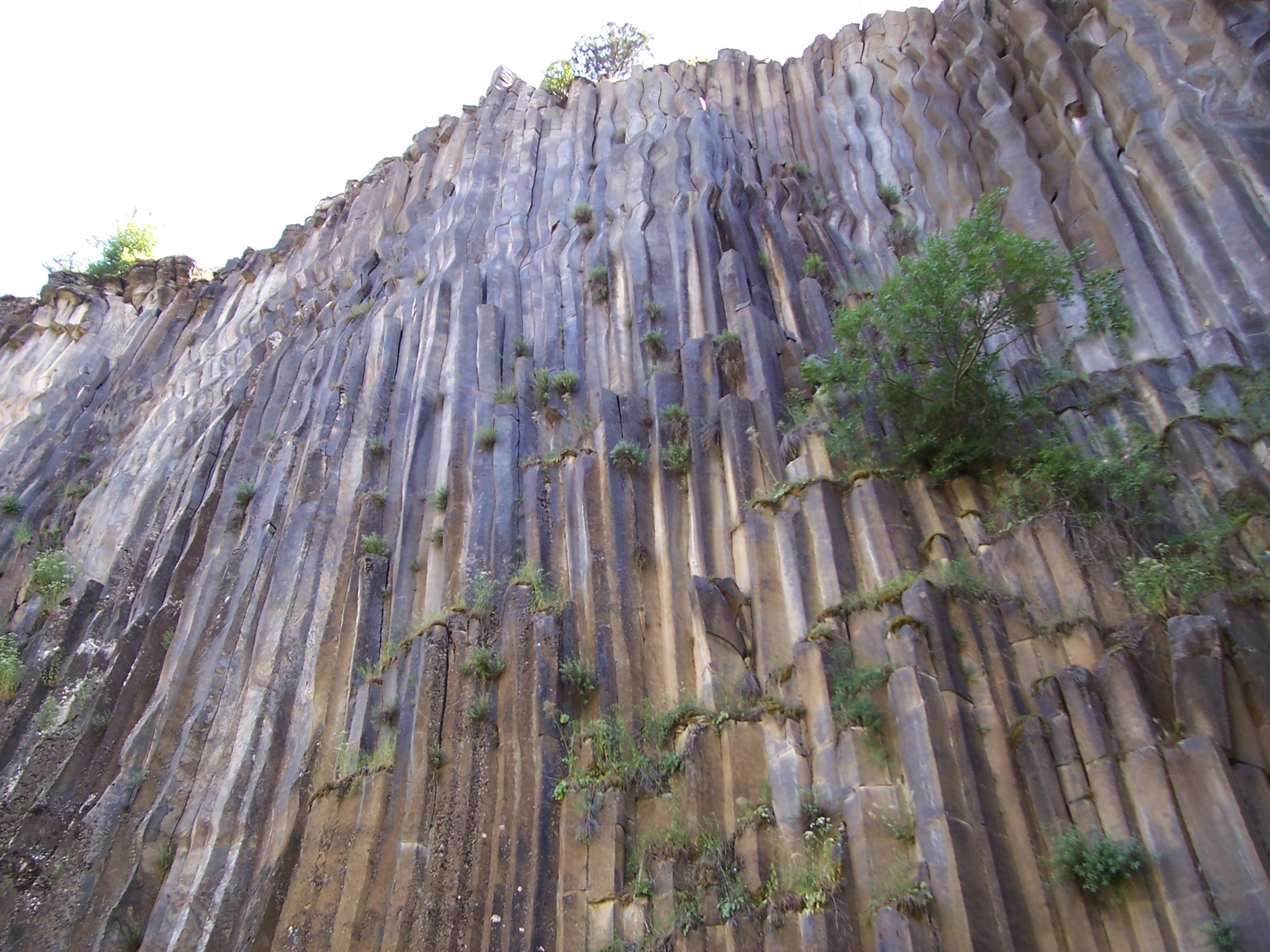
Vertically jointed columnar basalt of Basalt Rocks Natural Monument in Turkey

- Güzelcehisar Basalt Columns, Güzelcehisar, Bartın Province
- Basalt Rocks Natural Monument, Boyabat, Sinop Province

==== Vietnam ====
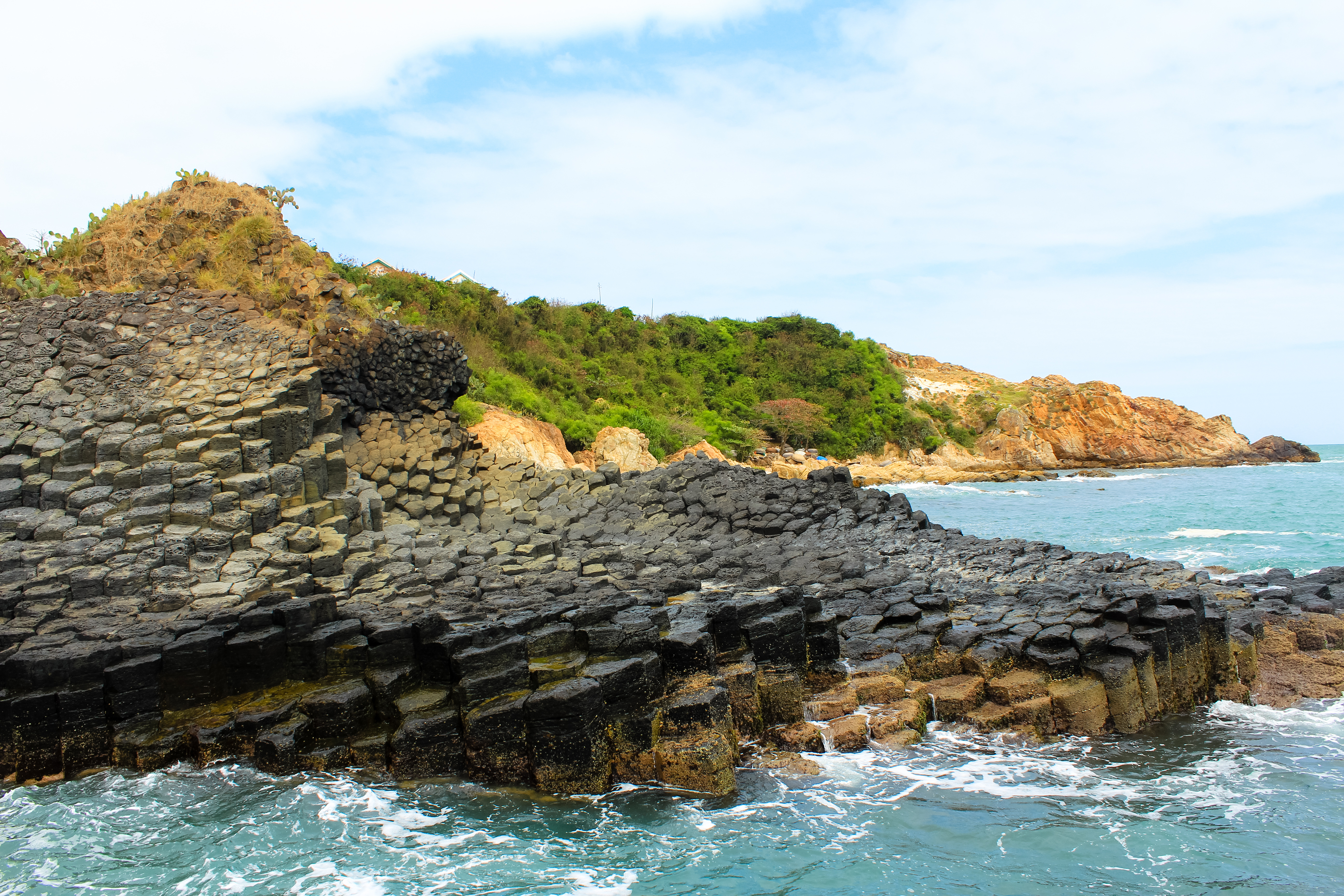
The Cliff of Stone Plates (Gành Đá Đĩa) near Tuy Hòa city, Phú Yên Province, Vietnam

- Da Dia Cliff (13.354154°N 109.293812°E) — The Cliff of Stone Plates (Vietnamese: Gành Đá Đĩa), An Ninh Đông Village, Tuy An District, Phú Yên Province, Vietnam
- Yen Islet (13.225638°N 109.308770°E) (Vietnamese: Hòn Yến)- An Hòa Village, Tuy An District, Phú Yên Province
- Vuc Hom Fall (13.196571°N 109.150737°E) (Vietnamese: Thác Vực Hồm) - An Lĩnh Village, Tuy An District, Phú Yên Province
- Vuc Song Fall (13.185074°N 109.149796°E) (Vietnamese: Thác Vực Song) - An Lĩnh Village, Tuy An District, Phú Yên Province
- Battle Fall (14.334100°N 108.680464°E) (Vietnamese: Thác Dơi) - Vĩnh Sơn Village, Vĩnh Thạnh District, Bình Định Province
- Takon Citadel (14.305230°N 108.703357°E) (Vietnamese: Thành đá Tà Kơn) - K8 (old name: Kon Blò), Vĩnh Sơn Village, Vĩnh Thạnh District, Bình Định Province

=== Europe ===
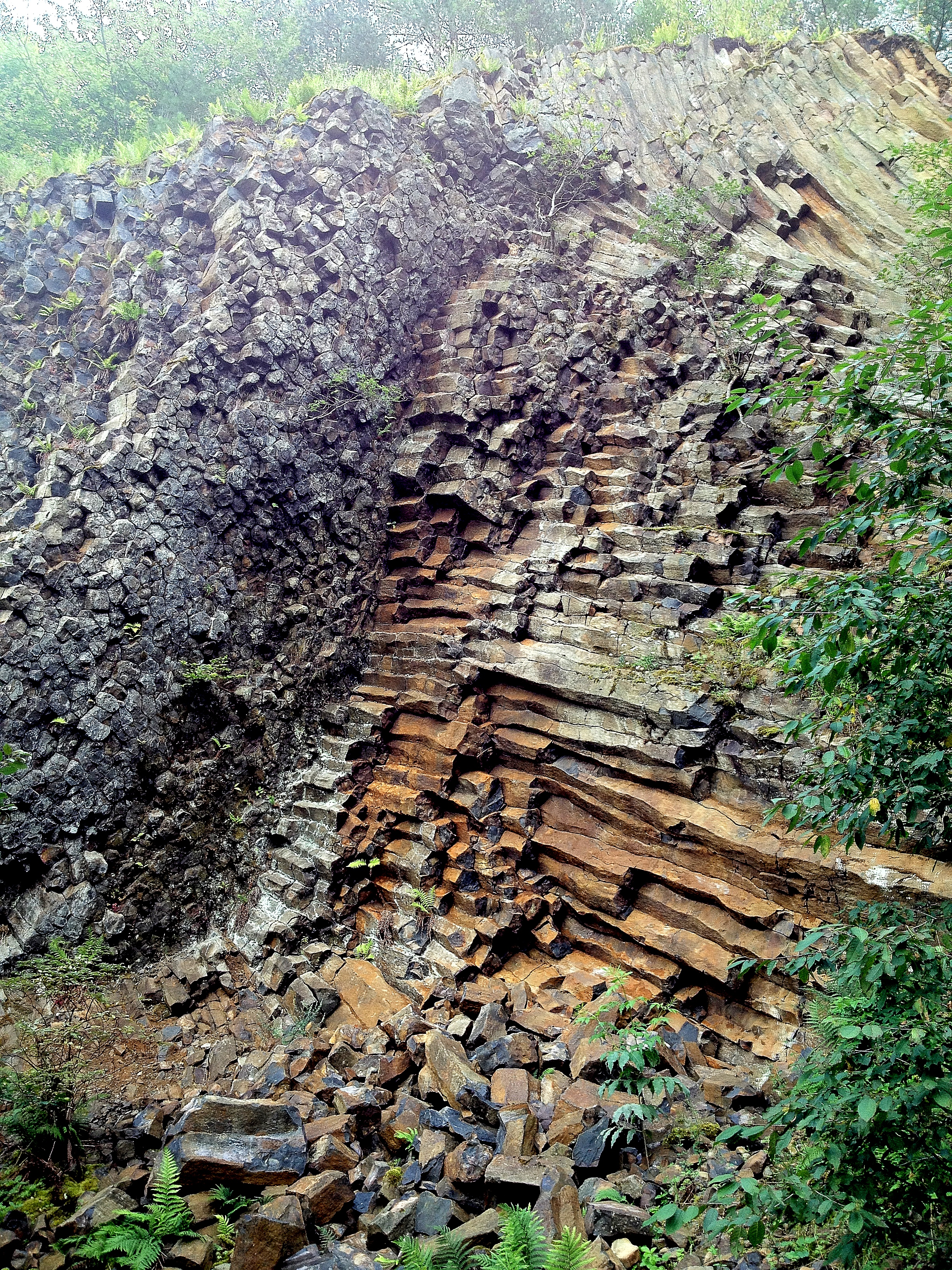
Basalt columns at Lindenstumpf, in the Rhön, North Bavaria, Germany

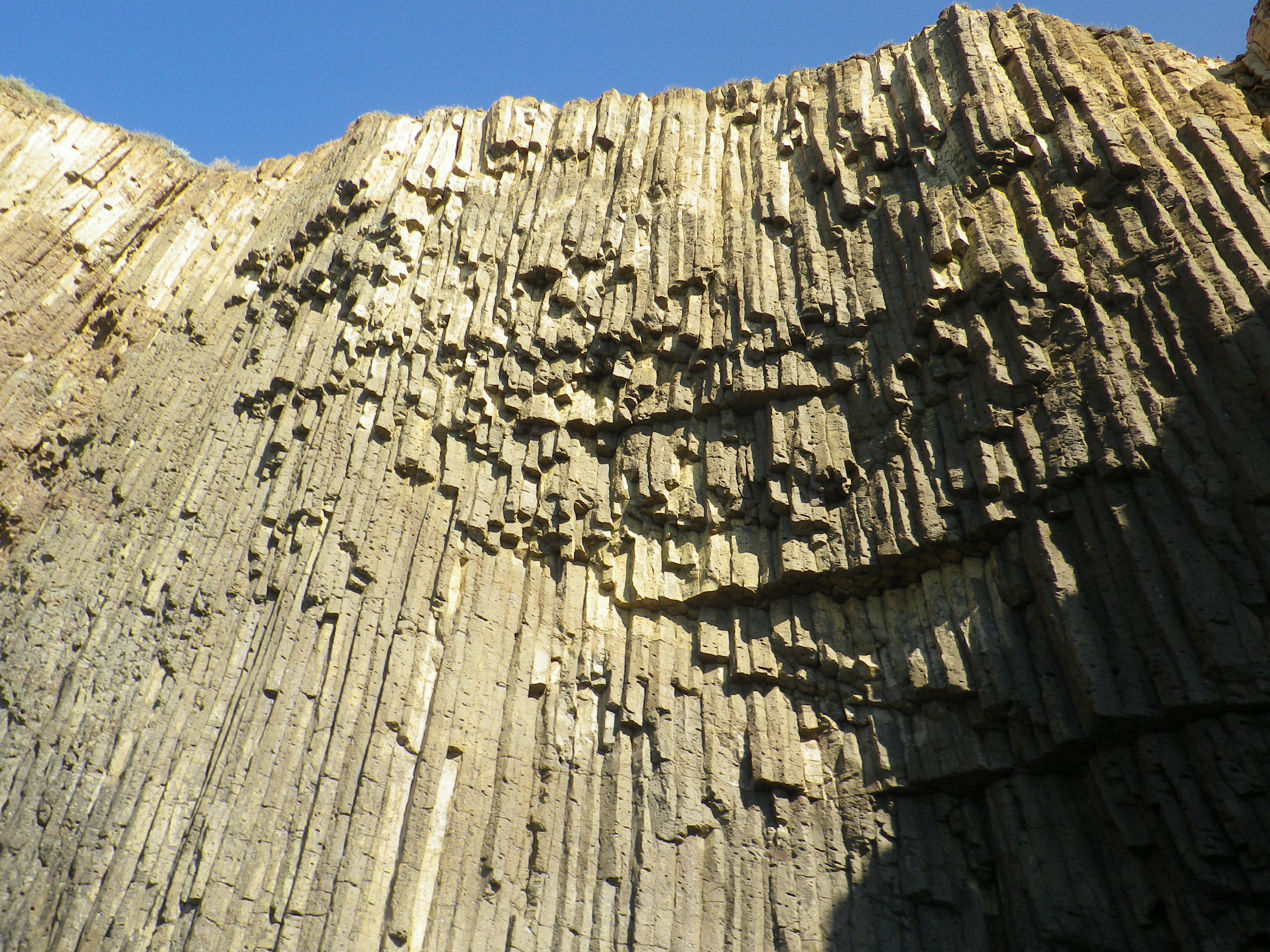
Volcanic rock columns, Milos, Greece

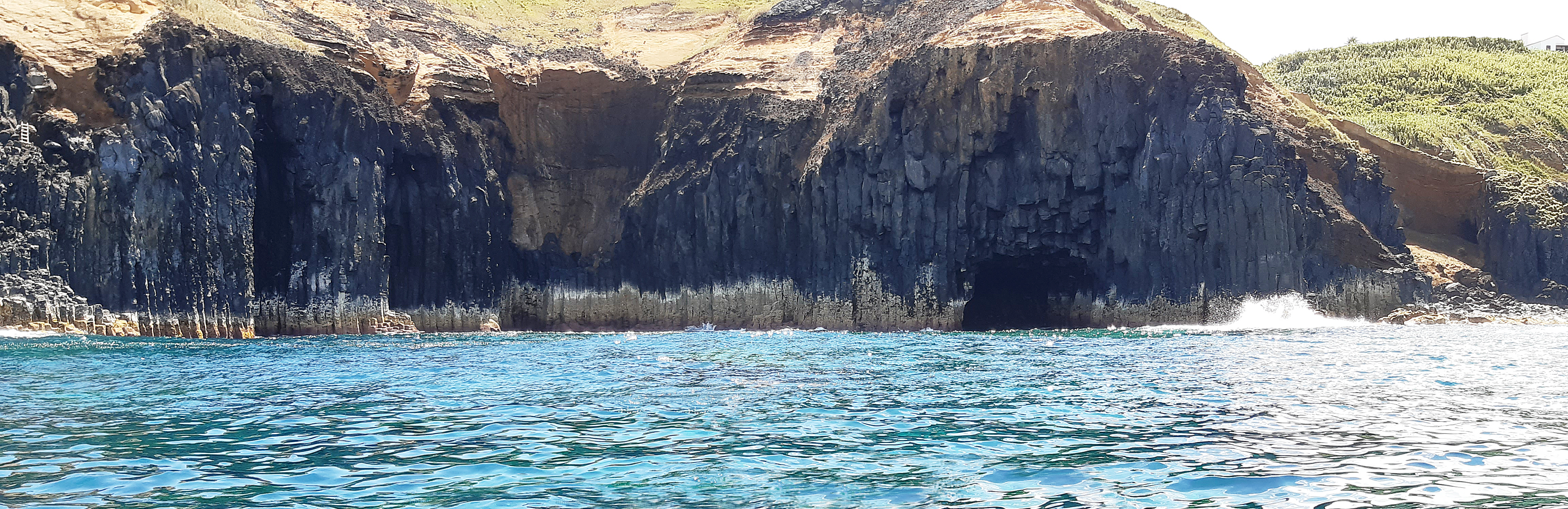
Ponta da Ajuda, Azores, Portugal

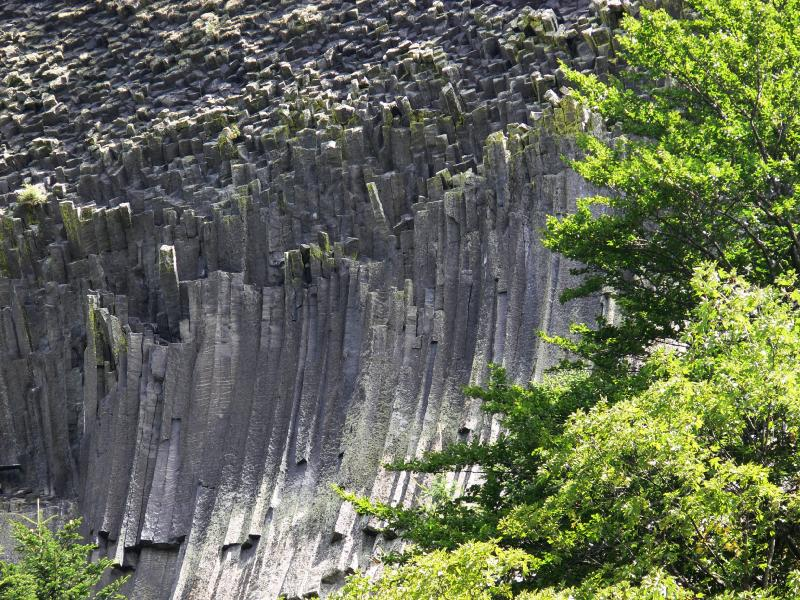
Basalt rocks near Detunata Goală east of Bucium, Romania

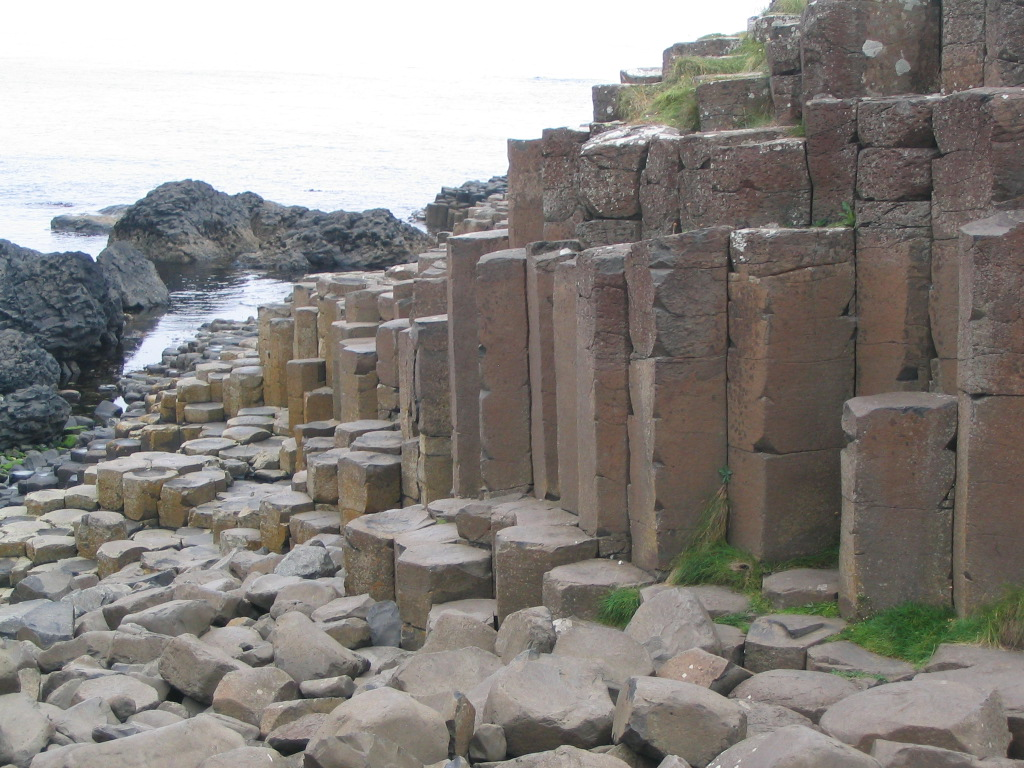
Columnar jointing in the basalt of the Giant's Causeway in Northern Ireland

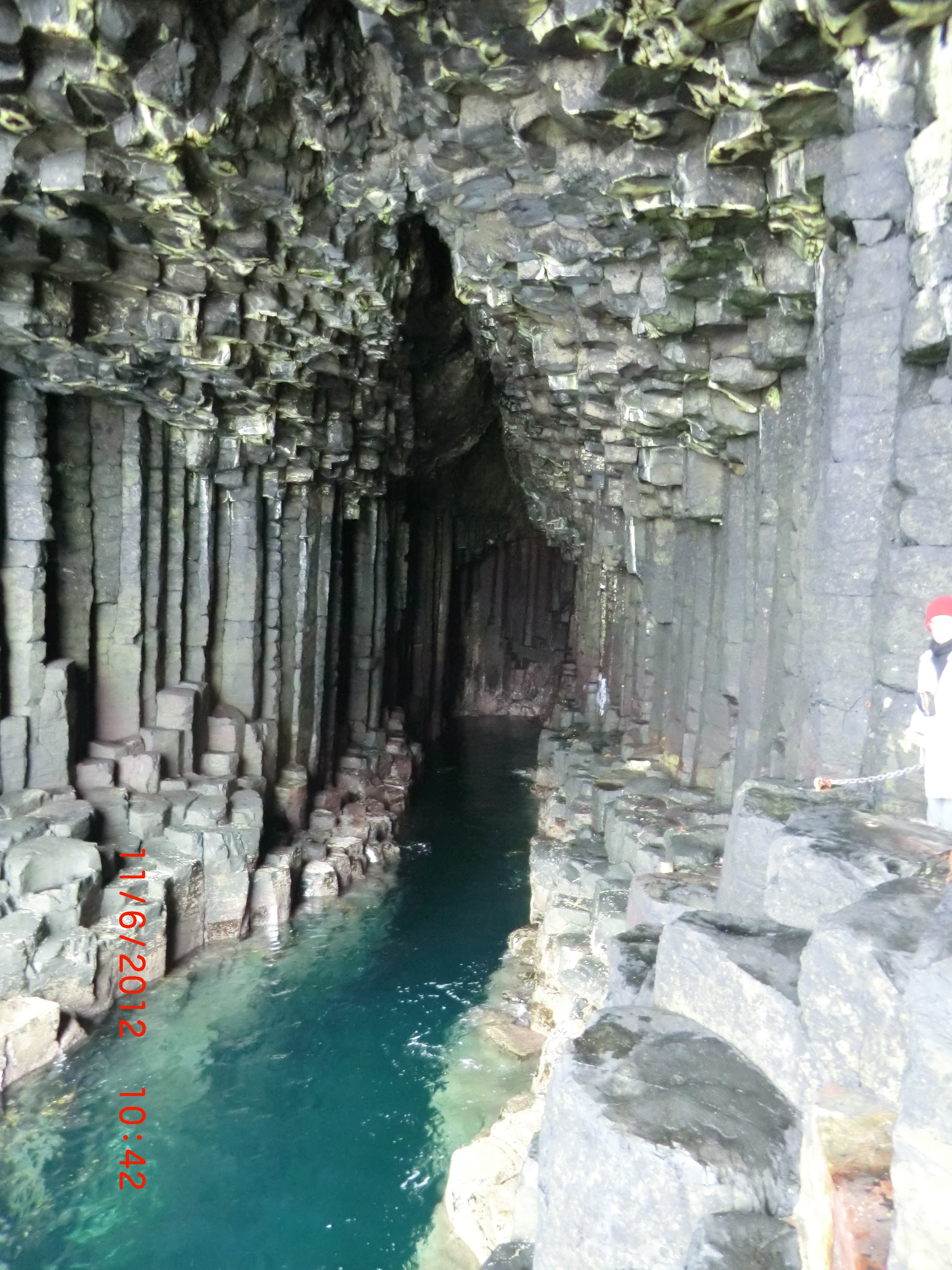
Fingal's Cave, Staffa Island, Scotland

==== Croatia ====
- Rupnica, Papuk Nature Park UNESCO Global Geopark

==== Czech Republic ====
- Panská skála, Kamenický Šenov, Czech Republic
- Zlatý vrch, Česká Kamenice, Czech Republic

==== Faroe Islands ====
- Froðba, Hov
- Hvalba and Trongisvágur, Suðuroy

==== France ====
- Thueyts, Jaujac and Fabras, Ardèche
- Saint-Flour, Cantal
- Chilhac
- Saint-Arcons
- Prades
- Saint-Clément
- Moulin-Béraud
- La Tour-d'Auvergne
- Bort-les-Orgues
- Scandola Nature Reserve, Corsica

==== Georgia ====
- Gudauri
- Sioni, Mtskheta-Mtianeti, Georgia

==== Germany ====
- Linz am Rhein / Mendig / Mayen, Rhineland-Palatinate
- Hoher Hagen (Dransfeld), Lower Saxony
- Lindenstumpf, Bavaria
- Burg Stolpen, Saxony
- Hainewalde, Saxony, Phonolite columns
- Scharfenstein, Hesse
- Weiselberg, Saarland

==== Great Britain ====
- The islands of Canna, Eigg, and Muck, Scotland
- Cullernose Point, near Craster, Northumberland, England
- The northern part of the Isle of Skye, Scotland
- The Isle of Mull and the nearby beach of Morvern, Scotland
- Samson's ribs, Scotland
- Fingal's Cave and Staffa, Scotland
- Pen Anglas, Pembrokeshire, Wales
- Ulva, Scotland
- Cave Dale, Castleton, Peak District
- Dunbar Harbour

==== Greece ====
- Milos, Greece

==== Hungary ====
- Somoskő
- Badacsony
- Bér
- Szanda
- Szilváskő
- Hegyestű
- Szent-György-hegy
- Gulács
- Haláp
- Hajagos
- Uzsa

==== Iceland ====
- Aldeyjarfoss, Þingeyjarsveit
- Borgarvirki
- Dverghamrar, Kirkjubæjarklaustur
- Gerðuberg
- Hellnahraun near Arnarstapi, Snæfellsbær
- Hljóðaklettar, Jökulsárgljúfur
- Kirkjugólf, Kirkjubæjarklaustur
- Kálfshamarsvík, Austur-Húnavatnssýsla
- Litlanesfoss, Fljótsdalshreppur
- Reynishverfi, Reynisdrangar and Reynisfjara, Vík í Mýrdal
- Stuðlagil, East of Iceland
- Svartifoss, Skaftafell

==== Northern Ireland ====
- Giant's Causeway, Northern Ireland

==== Italy ====
- Alcantara River Gorges, Sicily
- Capu Nieddu, Cuglieri, Sardinia
- Cuccureddu de Zeppara, Guspini, Sardinia
- Is Aruttas Santas, Villaurbana, Sardinia
- Cyclopean Isles, Sicily
- Motta Sant'Anastasia neck, Sicily
- The thrown stones, Lazio

==== Portugal ====
- Rocha dos Bordões cliffs, Flores, Azores
- Pico de Ana Ferreira, Porto Santo
- Penedo do Lexim, Mafra
- Ponta da Ajuda, Fenais da Ajuda, São Miguel island Ilha de São Miguel, Azores

==== Romania ====
- Coloanele de bazalt de la Racoș
- Thunderstruck Rocks (Detunatele)

==== Slovakia ====
- Šomoška rock waterfall

==== Spain ====
- Punta Baja, Cabo de Gata-Níjar Natural Park, Andalusia
- Castellfollit de la Roca, Girona
- Fruiz, Biscay
- Pitón volcánico de Cancarix, Albacete
- Monumento natural de Los Órganos, La Gomera, Canary Islands

==== Sweden ====
Central Skåne Volcanic Province:

- Vulkanen Rallate, Söderåsen National Park

==== Ukraine ====
- Bazal'tove
- Zhborivtsi

=== North and Central America ===
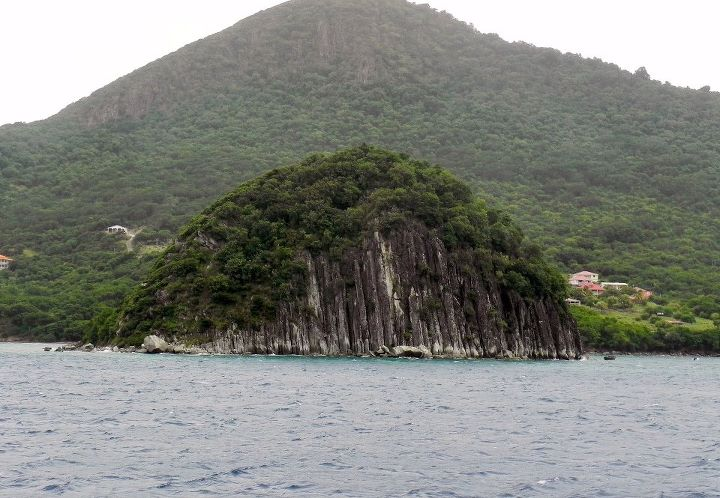
Columnar jointing in the basalt of the Pain de sucre (sugar loaf) in les Saintes, Guadeloupe

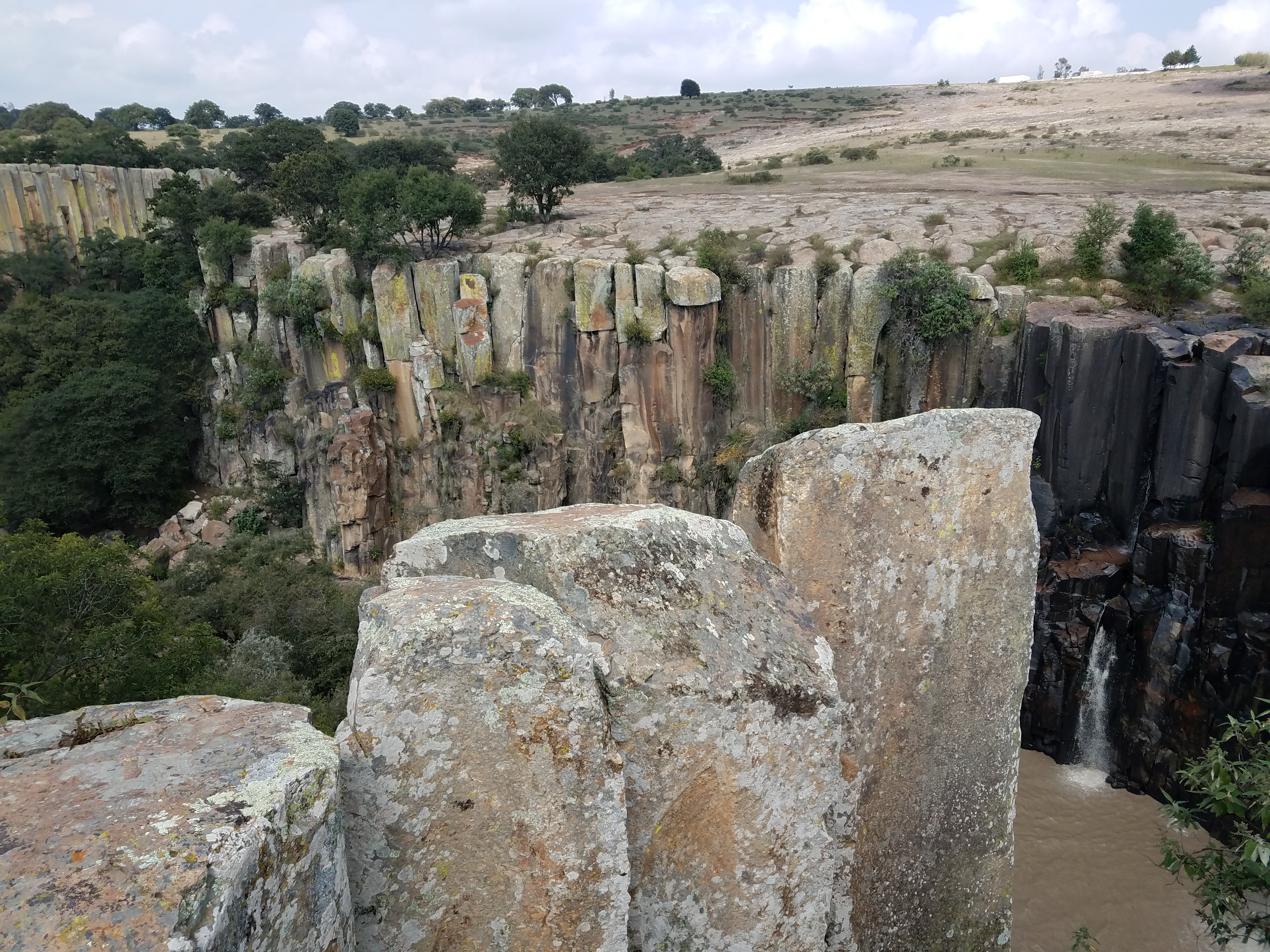
La Concepción, Aculco, México

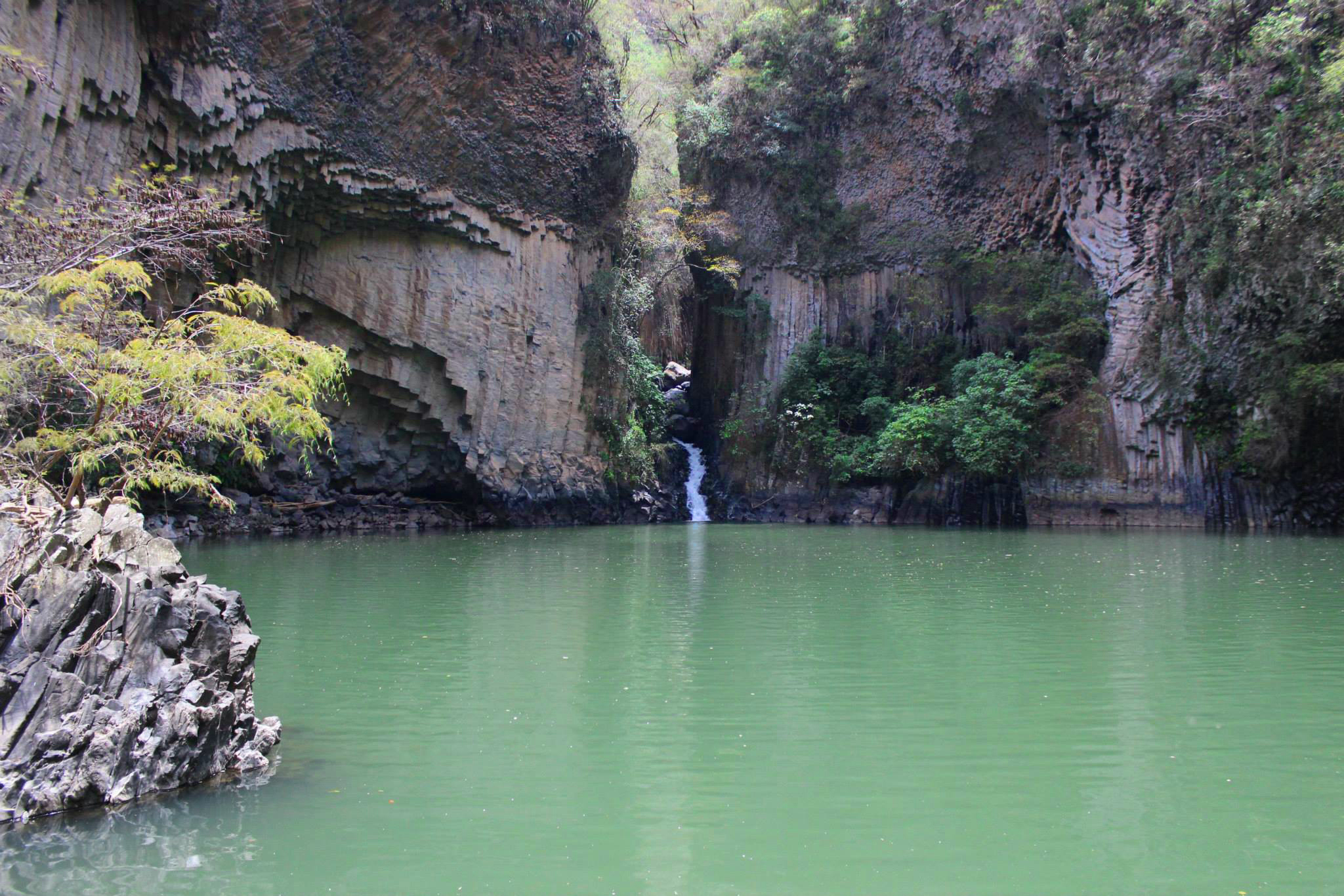
Basalt columns in the Mascota River, Mexico

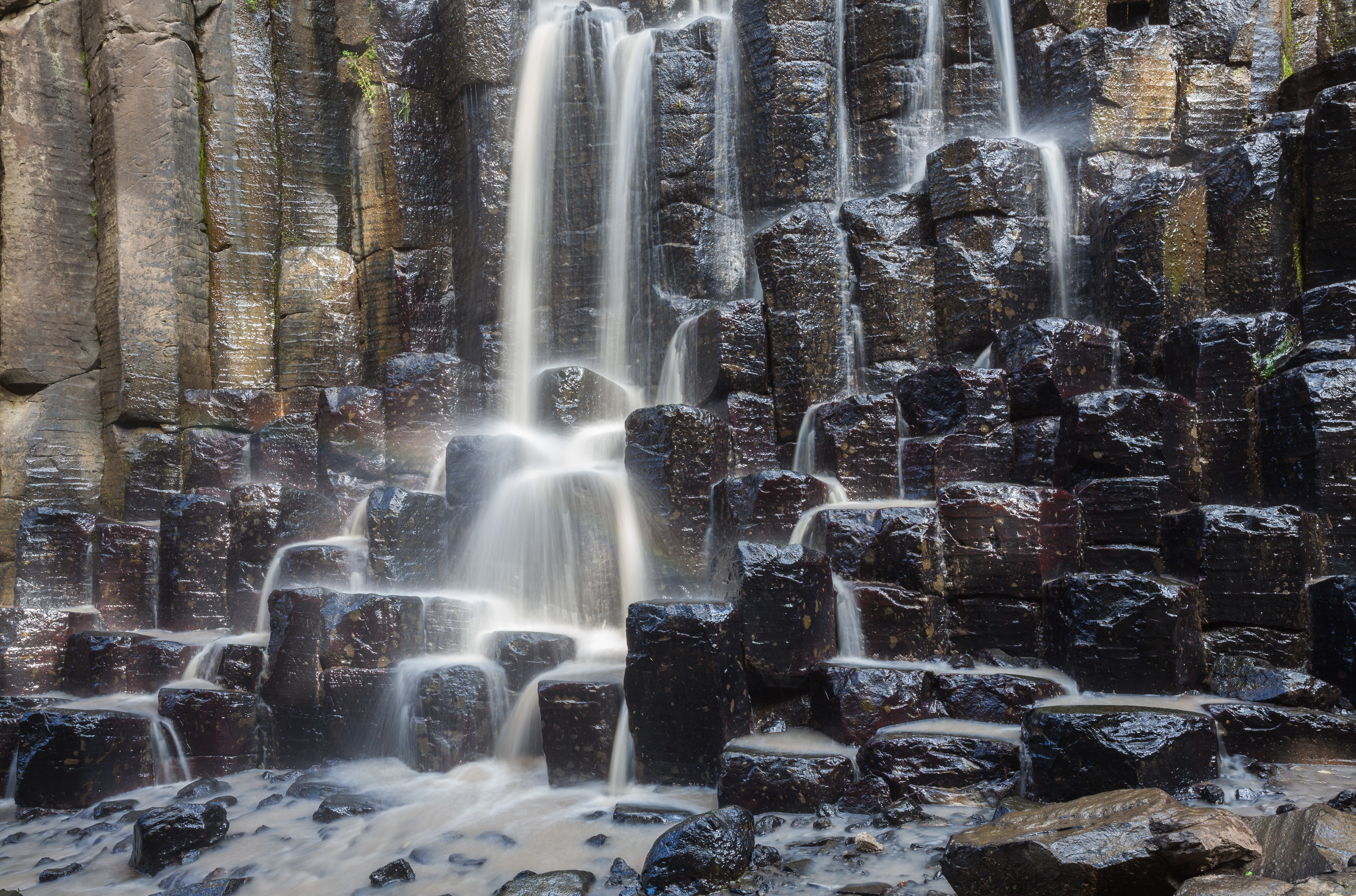
Basaltic Prisms of Santa María Regla in Huasca de Ocampo, Hidalgo

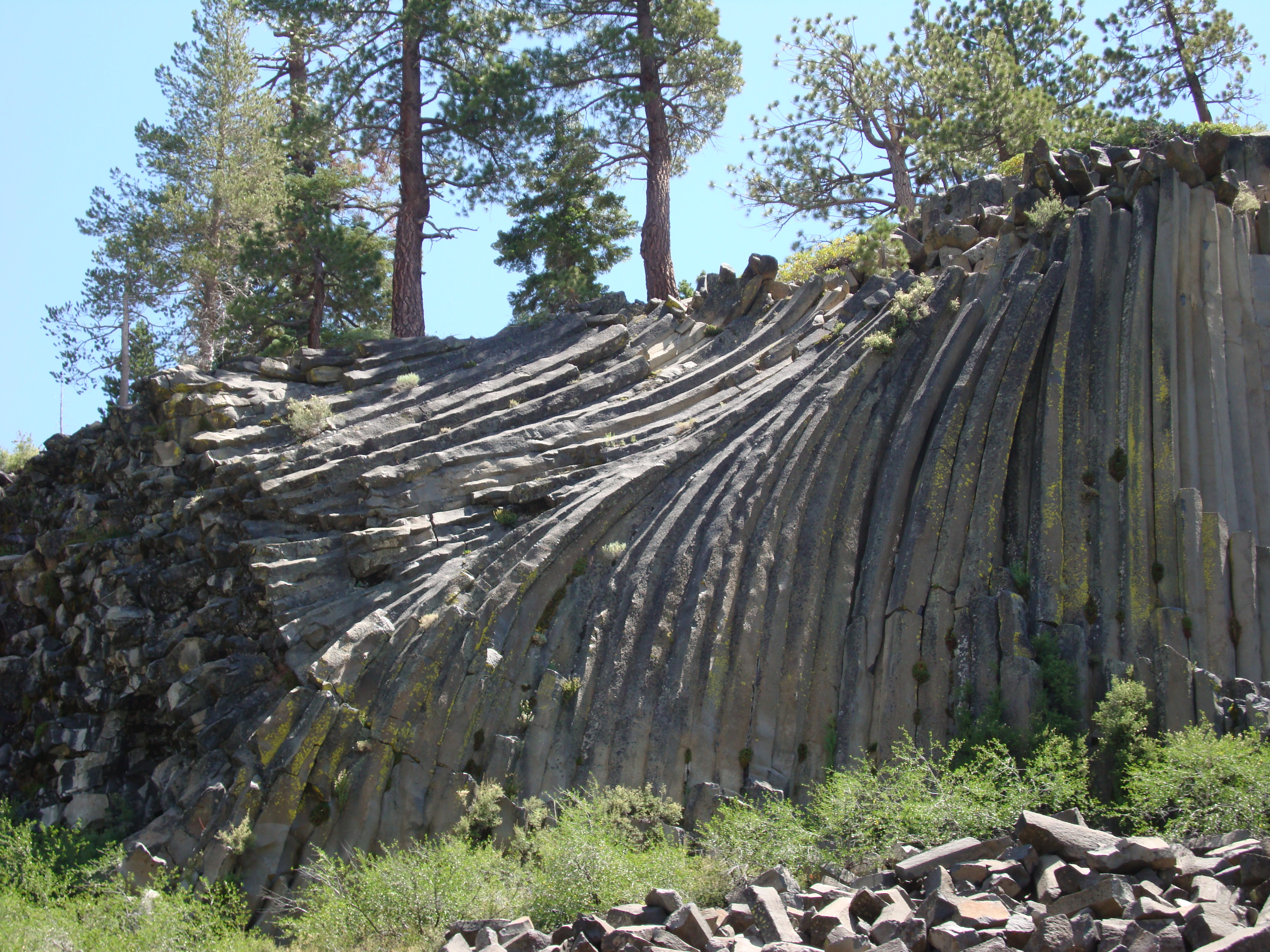
Columnar basalt at Devil's Postpile in California

==== Canada ====
- North Mountain, Nova Scotia
- Grand Manan Island (western shorelines), New Brunswick
- Brandywine Falls Provincial Park, British Columbia
- Cardiff Mountain, Chilcotin Plateau, British Columbia
- Keremeos Columns, Keremeos, British Columbia
- Aberdeen Columns, Lavington, British Columbia
- Wells Gray Provincial Park, British Columbia (Moul Falls, Dragon's Tongue, Helmcken Falls)
- Mount Edziza volcanic complex, British Columbia
- Level Mountain, British Columbia
- Teapot Mountain, Prince George, British Columbia
- Kelowna, British Columbia (Mount Boucherie, Spion Kopje)
- Devils Woodpile, British Columbia (Cathedral Provincial Park)
- Tow Hill, British Columbia
- Rouyn-Noranda, Quebec
- Simpson Island, Lake Superior National Marine Conservation Area, Rossport, Ontario
- Miles Canyon, Whitehorse, Yukon

==== Costa Rica ====
- Bajo Rodriguez, San Lorenzo de San Ramon

==== El Salvador ====
- Cascada Los Tercios, Suchitoto
- Concepción waterfall, Aculco

==== Greenland ====
- Qeqertarsuaq, Disko Island

==== Guadeloupe ====
- Pain de sucre (sugar loaf) Îles des Saintes, Guadeloupe

==== Guatemala ====
- Chicovix, Quetzaltenango Department

==== Mexico ====
- Basaltic Prisms of Santa María Regla in Huasca de Ocampo, Hidalgo
- Salto de San Anton in Cuernavaca, Morelos
- Flor De La Vida Retreat in Mascota, Jalisco

==== Panama ====
- Los Ladrillos, Boquete

==== United States ====
- Akun Island, Alaska 54.1374618°N 165.6120578°W
- Block Mountain, Montana (along the lower Big Hole River)
- Boiling Pots, Hilo, Hawaii (exposed by the Wailuku River)
- Cascade Range, Oregon, in Eugene and southeast of Molalla
- Columbia Plateau, Washington
- Columns of the Giants, Stanislaus National Forest, California
- Compton Peak in Shenandoah National Park, Virginia
- Devils Postpile National Monument, California
- Devils Tower National Monument, Wyoming
- Drumheller Channels National Natural Landmark, Washington
- Elk River Falls, Idaho
- Hughes Mountain, Missouri
- Hyalite Falls, Gallatin Mountain Range, Montana
- Whiterock Canyon, New Mexico, various cliffs and mesas from Otowi to Cochiti.
- Latourell Falls, Oregon
- Mount Tom, Massachusetts
- Machado Postpile, Amador County, California
- Paul Bunyan's Woodpile, Juab County, Utah
- Pinnacle Peak, King County, Washington
- Sheepeater Cliff & multiple other areas in Yellowstone National Park
- Hemlock Falls, First Watchung Mountain, South Mountain Reservation, South Orange, New Jersey
- Skinner Butte, Eugene, Oregon
- South Puyallup River Campsite, Mount Rainier National Park, Washington
- Spokane, Washington (W Airport Dr. onramp)
- Stanford Rock, Lake Tahoe, California
- Sweetwater Canyon, Madison County, Montana
- Toketee Falls, Oregon
- Turtleback Mountain, Moultonborough, New Hampshire
- Whatcom County, Washington

=== Oceania ===
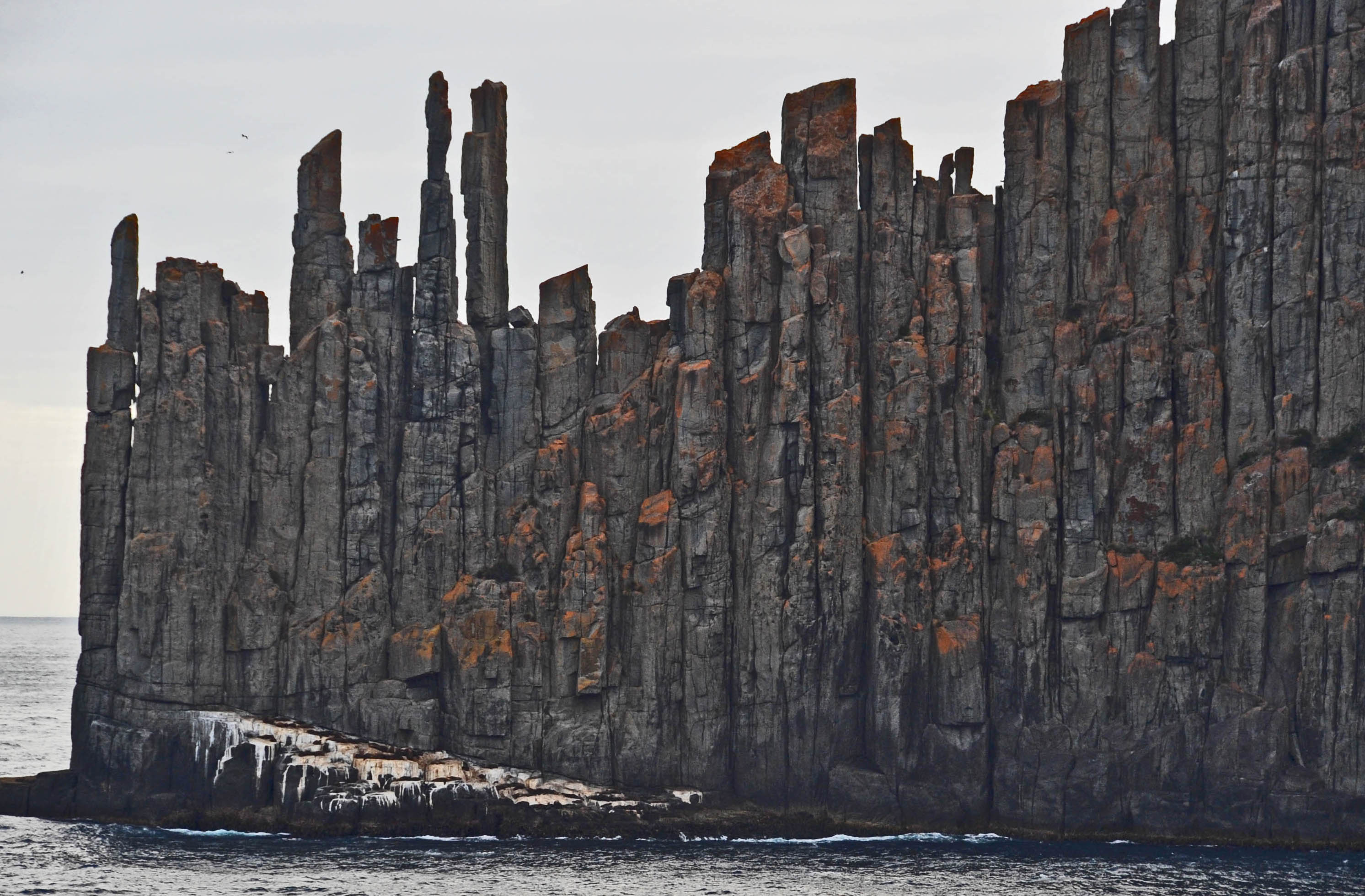
Cape Raoul, Tasmania

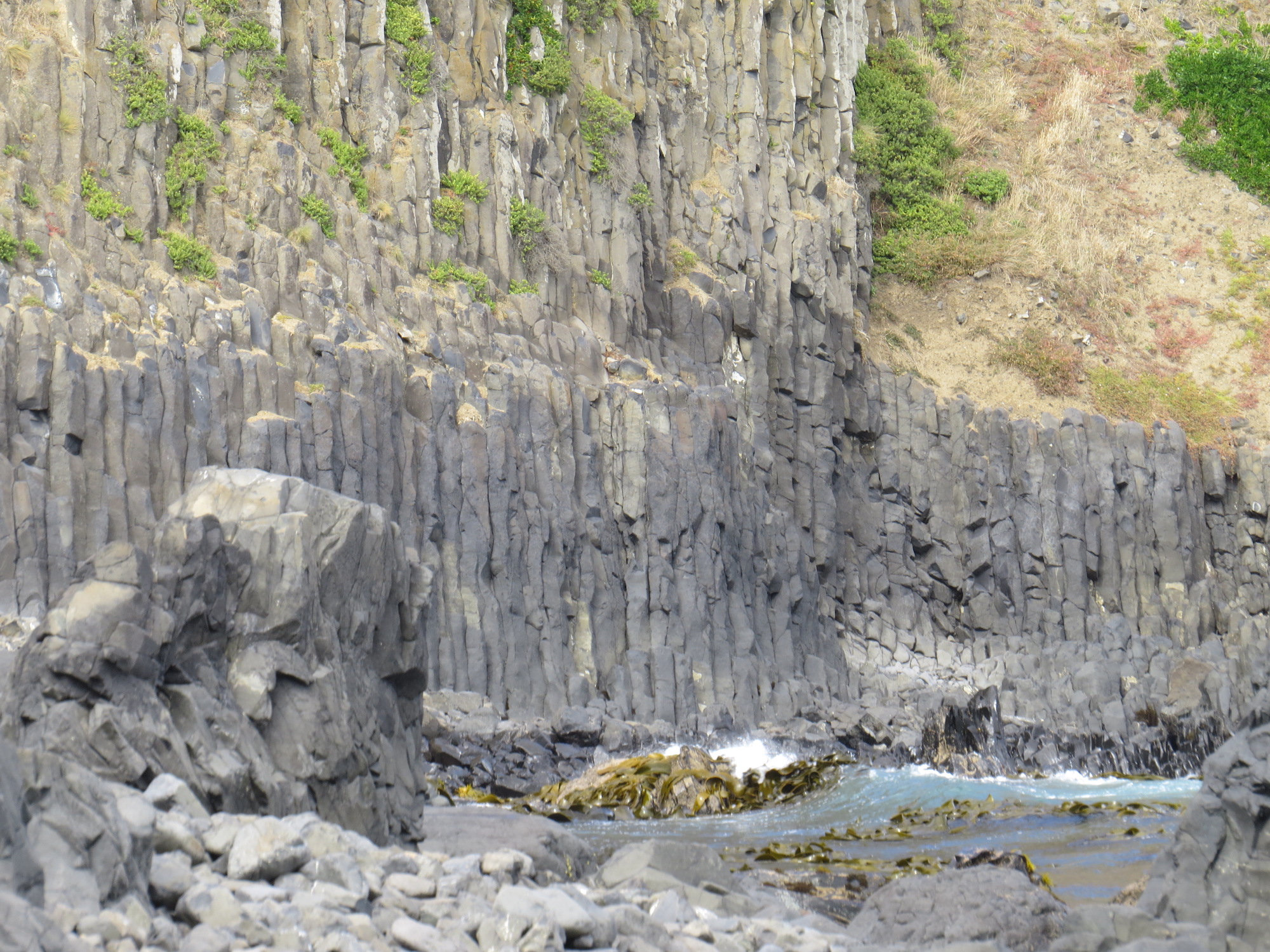
Blackhead, Dunedin, New Zealand

==== Australia ====
- Bombo Latite, Bombo, New South Wales
- Narooma Basalt, Narooma, New South Wales
- Fingal Head, New South Wales
- Battery Rock Rest Area, Located on the Golden Highway, 15 kilometres southeast of Merriwa and 19 kilometres northwest of Sandy Hollow on the western side of the highway. NSW
- Sawn Rocks, Mount Kaputar National Park, New South Wales
- Glass House Mountains, Queensland
- Burleigh Head National Park, Queensland
- Mount Scoria Conservation Park, Thangool, Queensland
- Ben Lomond National Park, Tasmania
- Cape Raoul, Tasmania
- Ruined Castle, Falls Creek, Victoria
- Organ Pipes National Park, Victoria
- Barfold Gorge, Campaspe River, Victoria
- Black Point, D'Entrecasteaux National Park, Western Australia
- Wyalup-Rocky Point, Bunbury, Western Australia

==== Federated States of Micronesia ====
- Pwisehn Malek, Pohnpei, Caroline Islands

==== New Zealand ====
- Blackhead, Dunedin 45°55′55″S 170°25′55″E
- Bridal Veil Falls, Raglan 37°54′30″S 174°53′45″E
- Mt Eden Quarry, Auckland, New Zealand Normandy Road, Mt Eden.
- Ohira Bay, Chatham Islands 43°48′20″S 176°38′55″W
- The Organ Pipes, Mount Cargill, Dunedin 45°48′30″S 170°34′00″E
- Paratahi Island, Auckland 36°59′41″S 174°28′13″E
- Second Beach, Dunedin 45°55′00″S 170°29′05″E
- Mount Somers / Te Kiekie, Canterbury 43°36′30″S 171°22′30″E
- Western Springs Quarry, Auckland 859 Great North Rd, Auckland.

=== South America ===
- Ancud Volcanic Complex, Chile
- Las Columnas de Tangán, Ecuador
- Mocho Volcano, Chile
- Pino Hachado Caldera, Neuquén Province, Argentina
- Pedras do Cambira, Apucarana, Brazil

== Beyond Earth ==
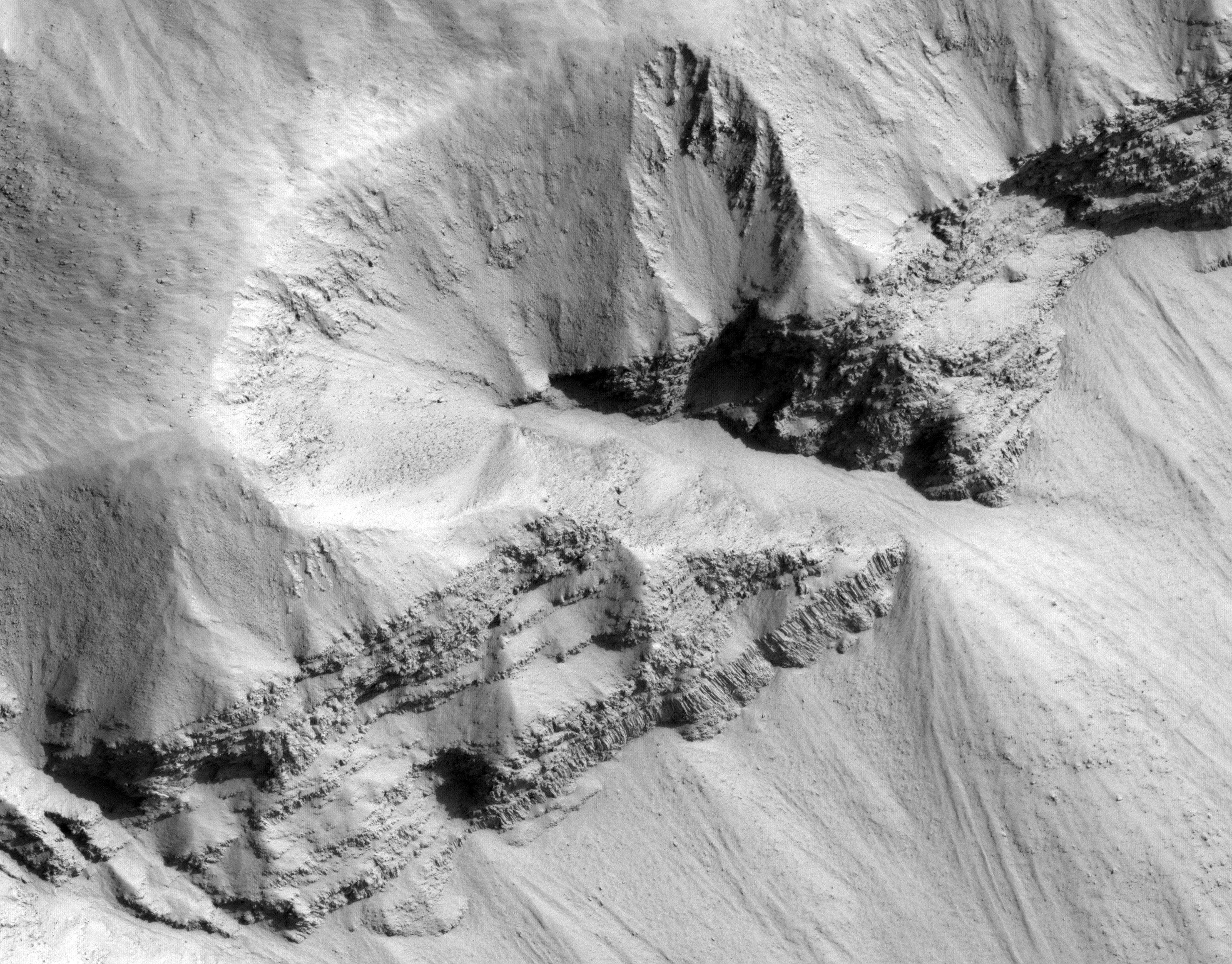
Columnar jointed rocks in unnamed crater wall, Marte Vallis region, Mars. Image courtesy of the High Resolution Imaging Science Experiment, Arizona State University.

Several exposures of columnar jointing have been discovered on the planet Mars by the High Resolution Imaging Science Experiment (HiRISE) camera, which is carried by the Mars Reconnaissance Orbiter (MRO). Notable among them are formations in the Marte Vallis.

== Uses ==
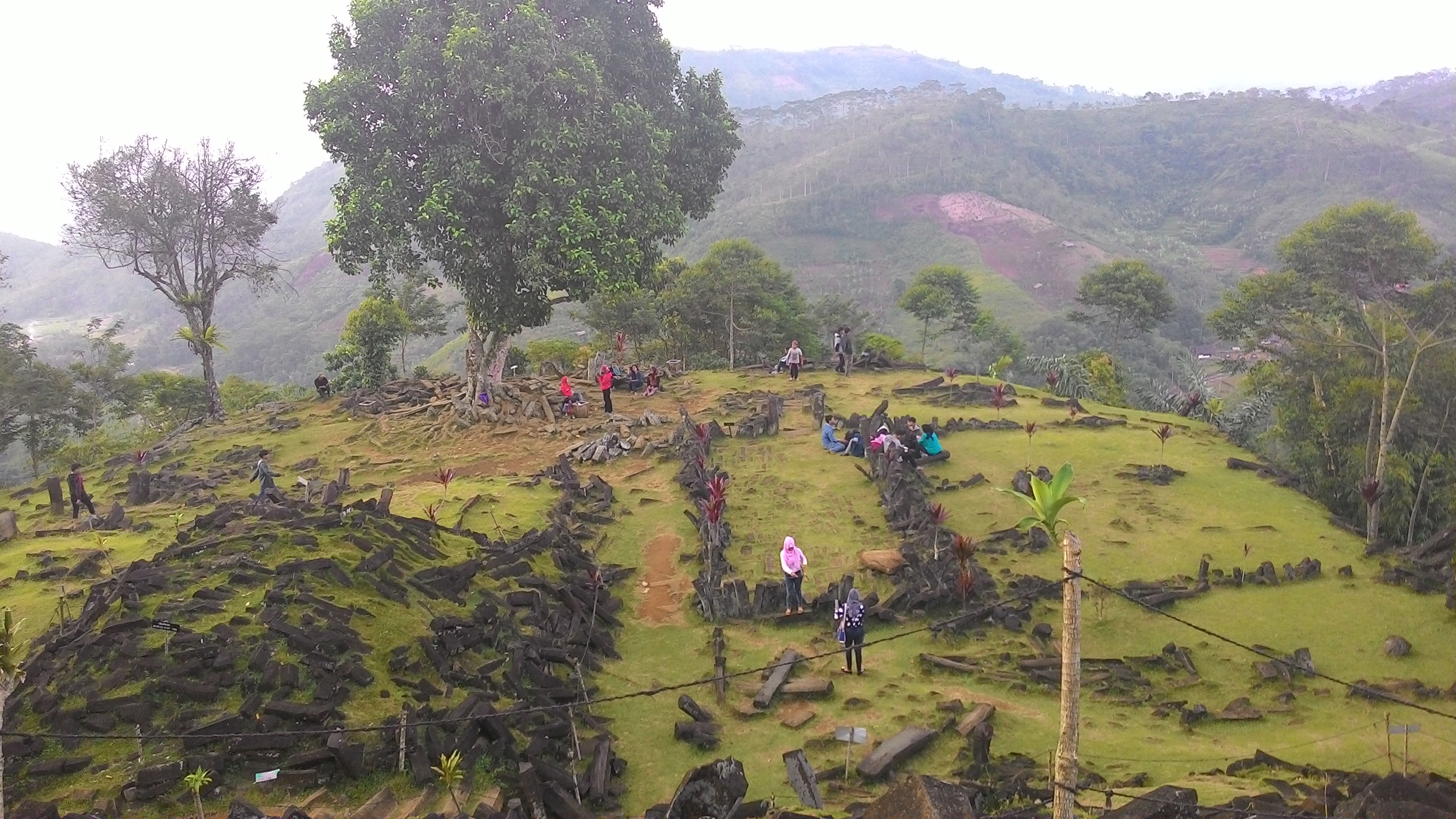
A view of Gunung Padang

A likely Hindu-origin ancient site at Gunung Padang in West Java, Indonesia was built by horizontally laying basalt columns to form terraces on the slope of a hill and creating open-roofed chambers by erecting vertical columns. A now-ruined thirteenth-century religious complex called Nan Madol was built using columnar basalt quarried from various locations on the island of Pohnpei in Micronesia.

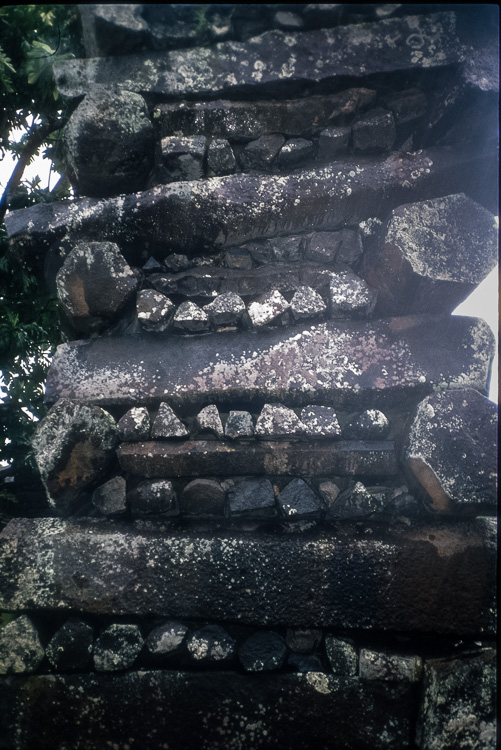
Detail of columnar basalt pieces at Nan Madol

Hexagonal basalt was used to build retaining walls by early settlers in some places around Dunedin in New Zealand.

== Gallery ==
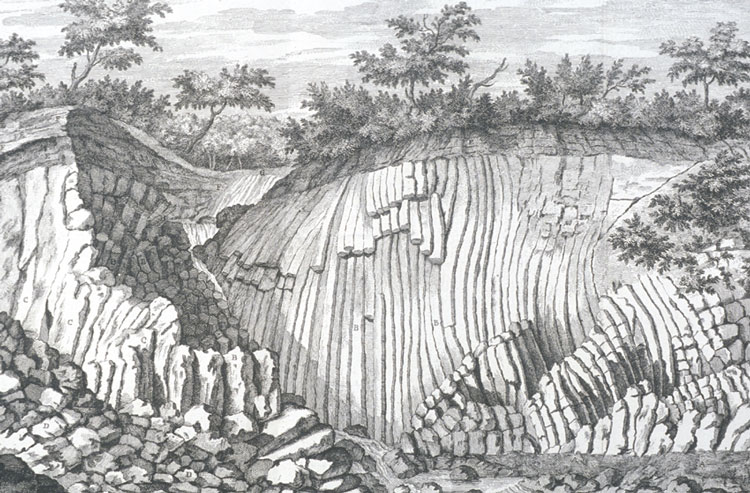
Engraving of a basalt formation; from: Alberto Fortis, Della valle vulcanico-marina di Roncà nel territorio veronese (1778)

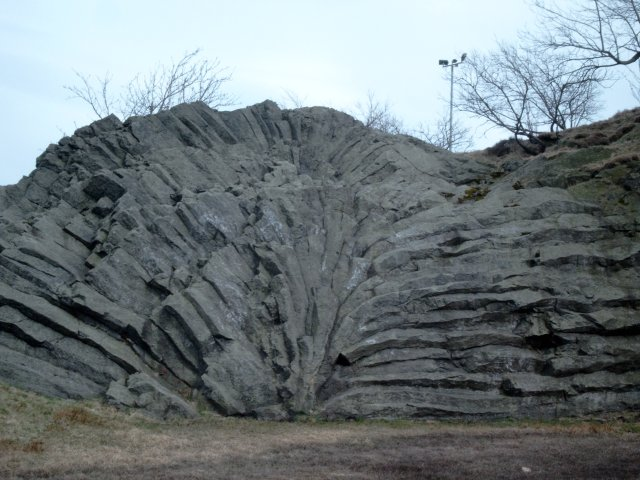
Basalt rocks on the Hirtstein in the Ore Mountains

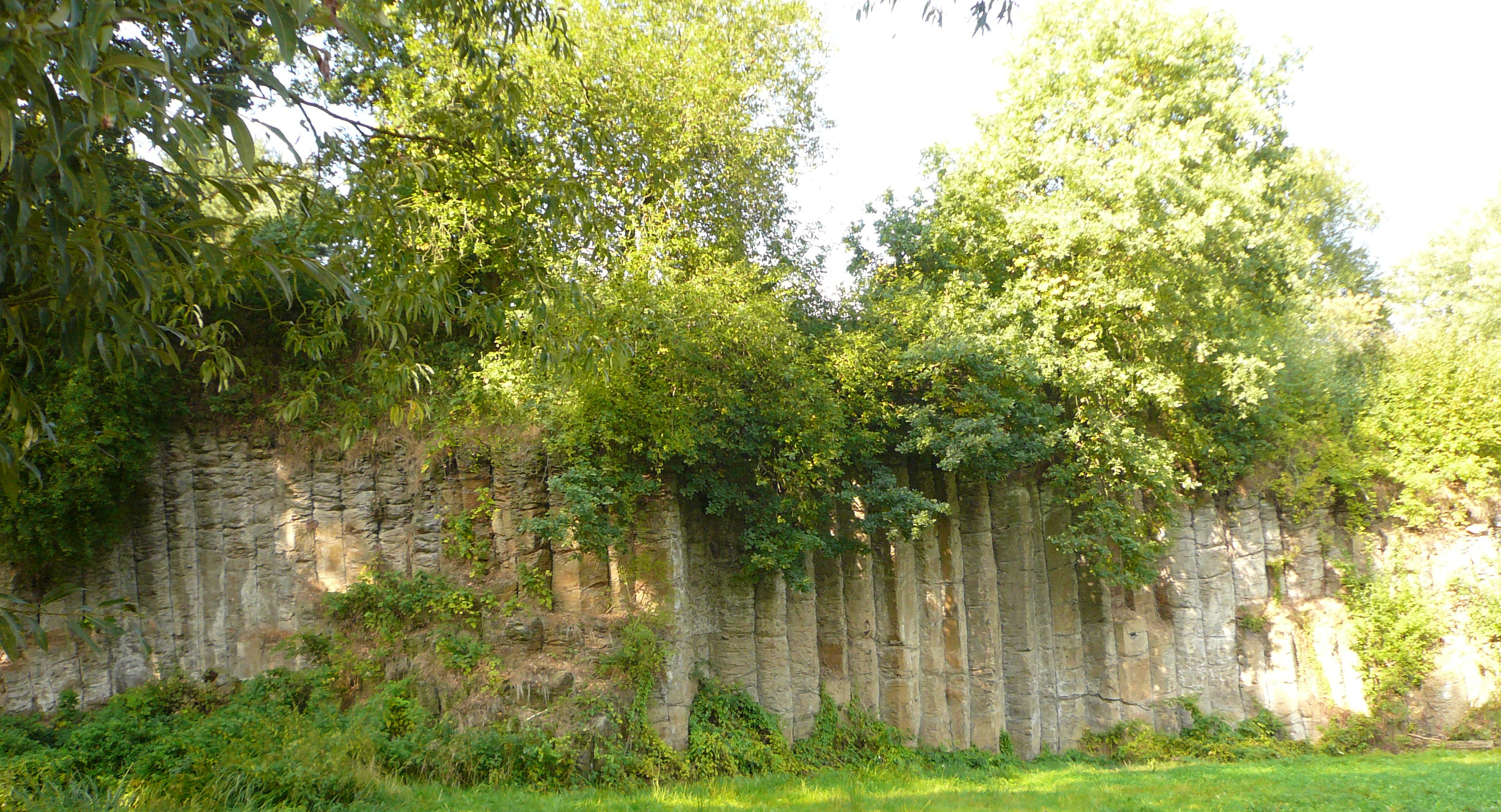
The Bühren Organ Pipes

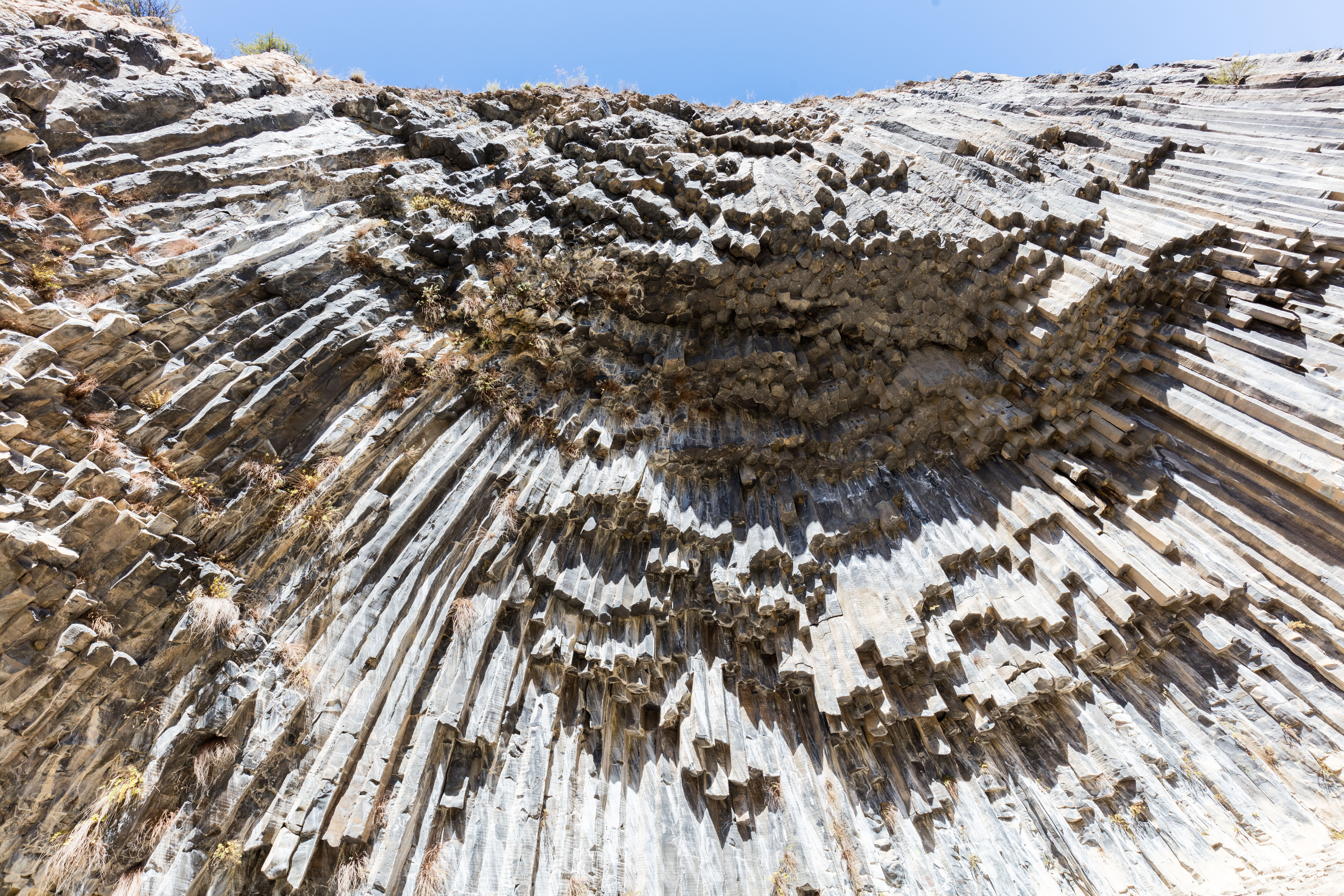
Garni Gorge, Armenia

== See also ==
- Ringing rocks
