= Basalt columns =

Basalt columns may refer to:

- Columnar basalt
- Columnar joints
- Basalt Columns, a geological nature monument near the village Bazaltove, Ukraine

== See also ==
- List of places with columnar jointed volcanics
