= Basalt Rocks =

Geologic formation in Sinop Province, Turkey

Basalt Rocks Bazalt Kayalıkları (Turkish)
- Columnar basalt
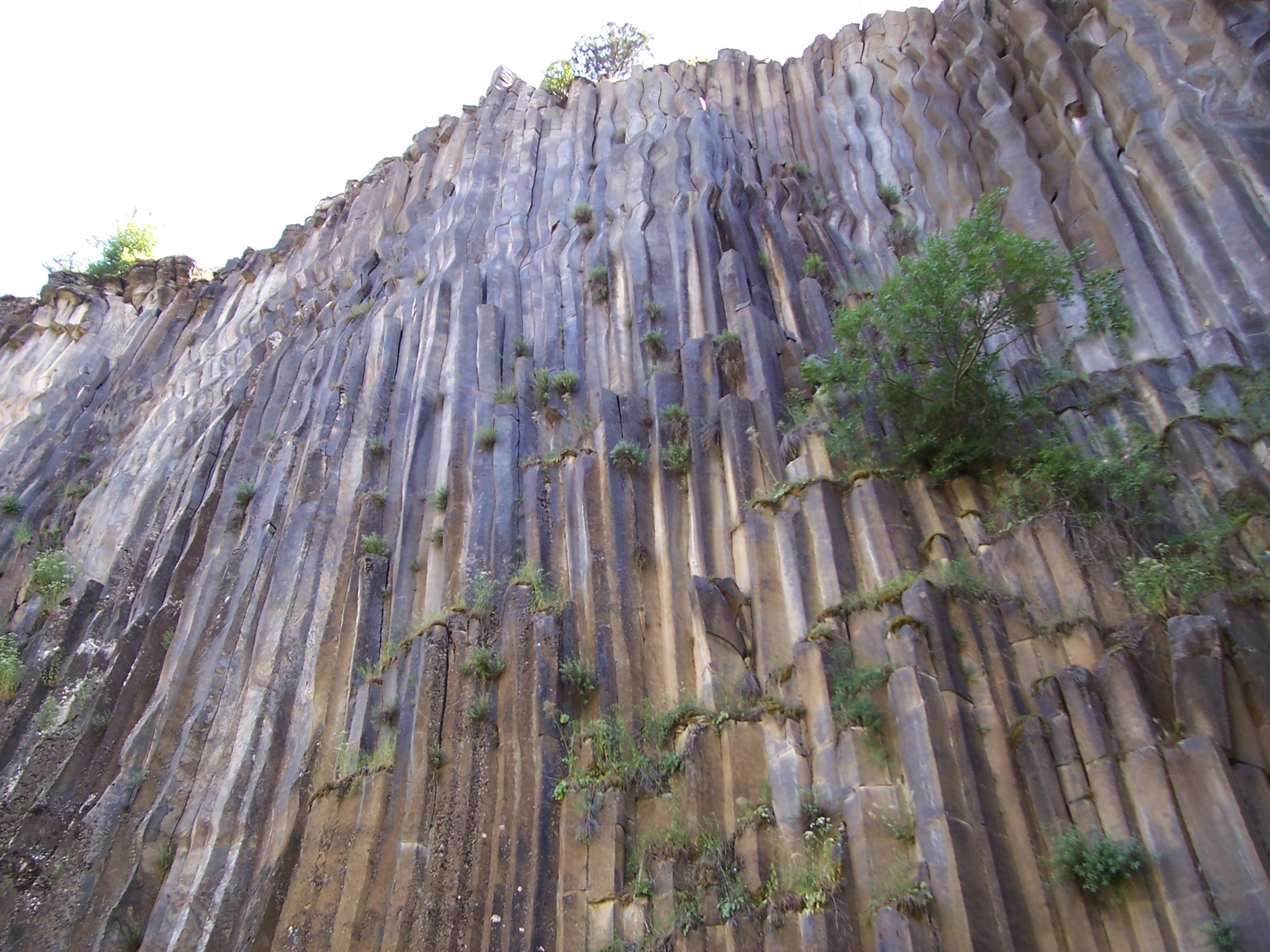
- Columnar basalt formation in Boyabat, Sinop Province, Turkey.

- Location of Basalt Rocks in Turkey.
- Coordinates: 41°28′26″N 34°38′27″E
- Location: Kurusaray, Boyabat, Sinop Province, Turkey

Area
  - Total: 52.374 hectares (129.42 acres)

Basalt Rocks (Turkish: Bazalt Kayalıkları) are volcanic rock outcrops in the form of columnar basalt located in Sinop Province, northern Turkey. The area is a registered natural monument of the country.

It is 20 km (12 mi) away from the center of Boyabat in Sinop Province, and situated in Fındıklık location nearbay Kurusaray village.

The basalt columns were formed about 3-5 million years ago according to research carried out by geologists from Mineral Research and Exploration Co. (MTA) and Dokuz Eylül University.

The basalt formations are situated in three neighboring valleys. The vertically-jointed basalt columns are in polygonal form as rectangular, pentagonal and hexagonal prisms, and are 30–40 m (98–131 ft) high. It covers an area of 10.249 ha (25.33 acres).

The formation, structure, and the outlook of the basalt rocks are rare examples in the world. It was declared a protected area of first grade on March 8, 1996 due to its geological and touristic importance. On September 17, 2007, the local administration applied to the Ministry of Forest and Water Management for acknowledgement as a natural monument. The area was registered a natural monument in 2011.
