= Dverghamrar =

Cliffs in Iceland

- Columnar basalt cliffs
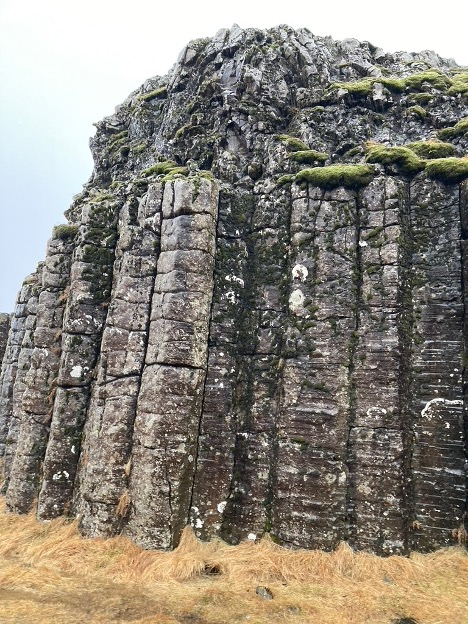

- Location in Iceland
- Coordinates: 63°50′57.5″N 17°51′36.4″W
- Location: South of Iceland
- Formed by: Lava flow
- Geology: Basalt and pyroclastic material
- Nickname: "Dwarf Cliffs"

Dverghamrar (also known as "Dwarf Cliffs" or "Dwarf Rocks") is a geological formation in Southern Iceland, consisting of columnar jointing of volcanic rocks. The formation appears as vertical, hexagonal columns of varying heights. Situated off the Ring Road in the town of Kirkjubæjarklaustur, the cliffs are a popular destination for tourists.

== Geological features ==
Dverghamrar formed from a lava flow that cooled into columns. The bottom of the structure consists of a hexagonal pattern, while the upper part appears irregular in shape. Layers of solidified lava and volcanic ash deposited on the surroundings. The formation likely began during the Ice Age.

== Folklore ==
The cliffs occupy a place in Icelandic mythology. A popular story involves a young girl, who, in 1904, heard singing while herding sheep there. The book Íslenskar Þjóðsögur og sagnir gives an account of the event:

She reported hearing a beautiful song. This stopped her in her tracks as she did not expect to encounter anyone there, and it did not seem to be someone she already knew. She said she then sat for a moment to listen to the song. It was the hymn "Faðir á himna hæð" ("Father in Heaven") that was being sung. When she was certain she had identified it correctly, she returned home but said she could still hear it for a while behind her. However, when it was confirmed that no one had been there [at that time], some believed it was the dwarfs in the cliffs who had sung, and according to this account, they must have been Christian beings, part of the race of the high elves.

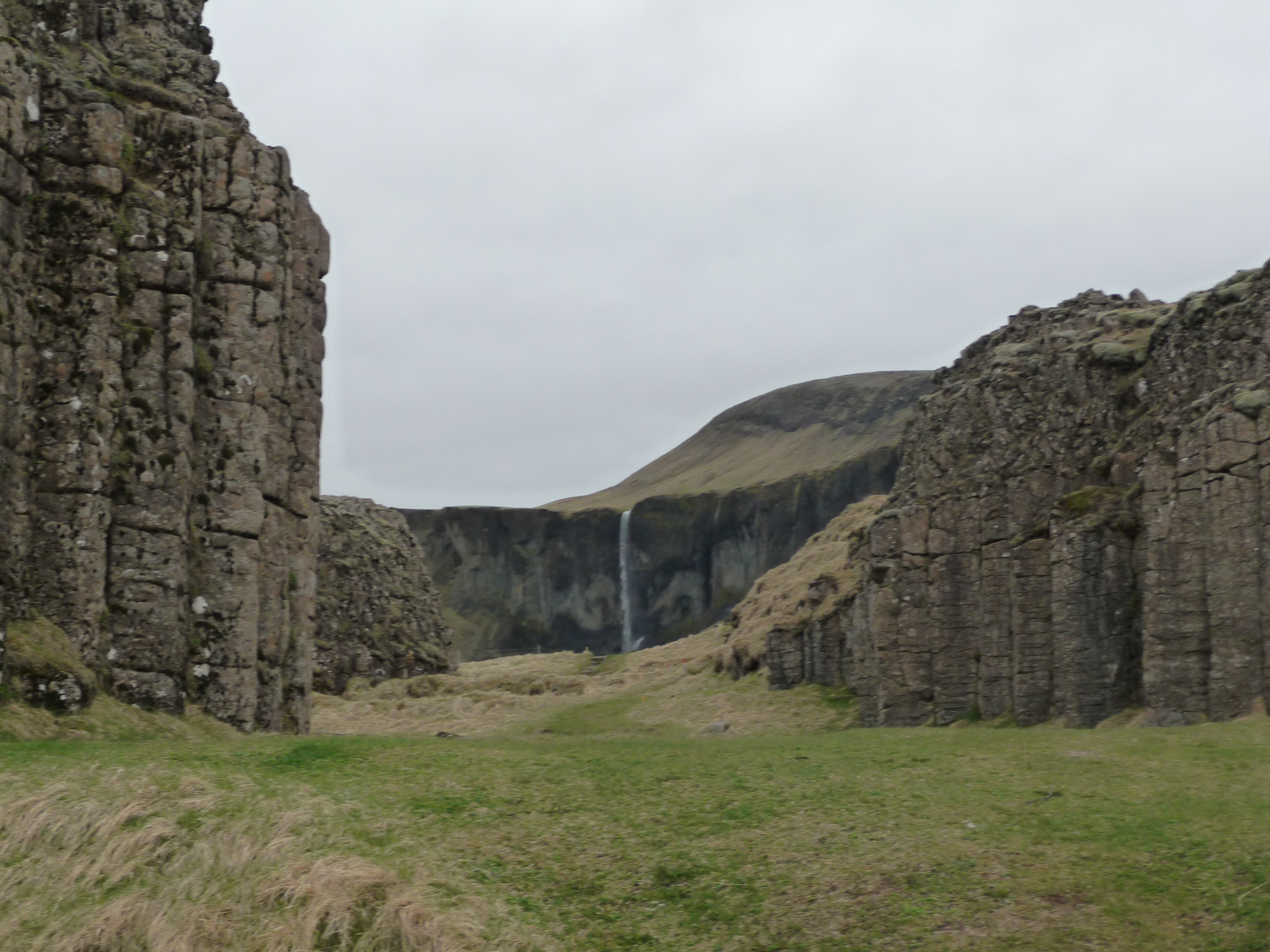
View of Síða waterfall from the cliffs

== See also ==
- Columnar basalt
- List of places with columnar jointed volcanics
