= Panská skála =

Rock formation in Czechia

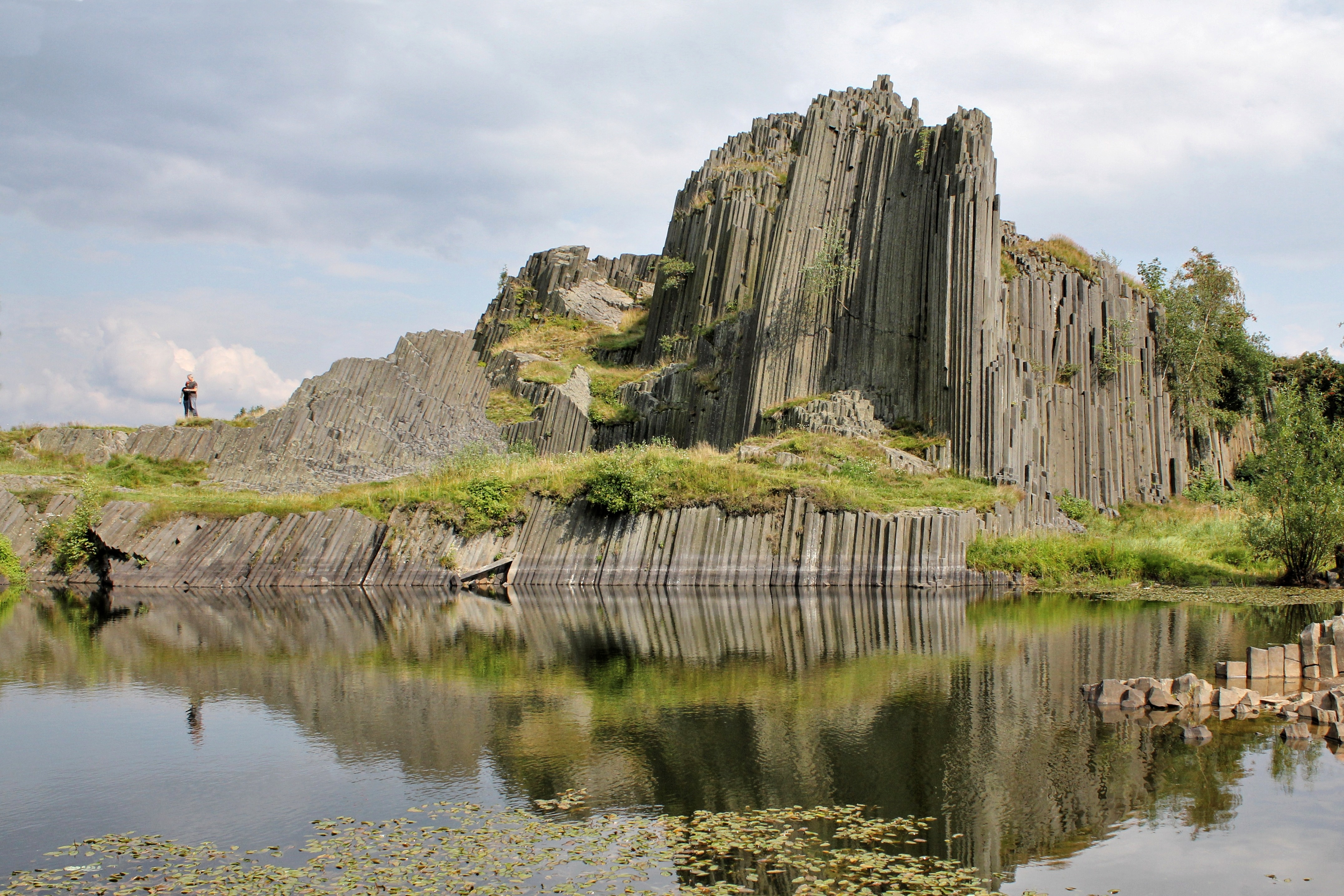
Panská skála, Czech Republic

Panská skála, a geologic formation 80 kilometers north of Prague, lies in the historical region of Bohemia in the Czech Republic. Panská skála is like the Giant's causeway, Ireland, or the Devil's Postpile, California. The volcanic formation is in the Central European Volcanic Province, and is thought to have been formed 30 million years ago.

== See also ==
- List of places with columnar jointed volcanics
