= Cape Stolbchaty =

Cape on Kunashir Island, Russia

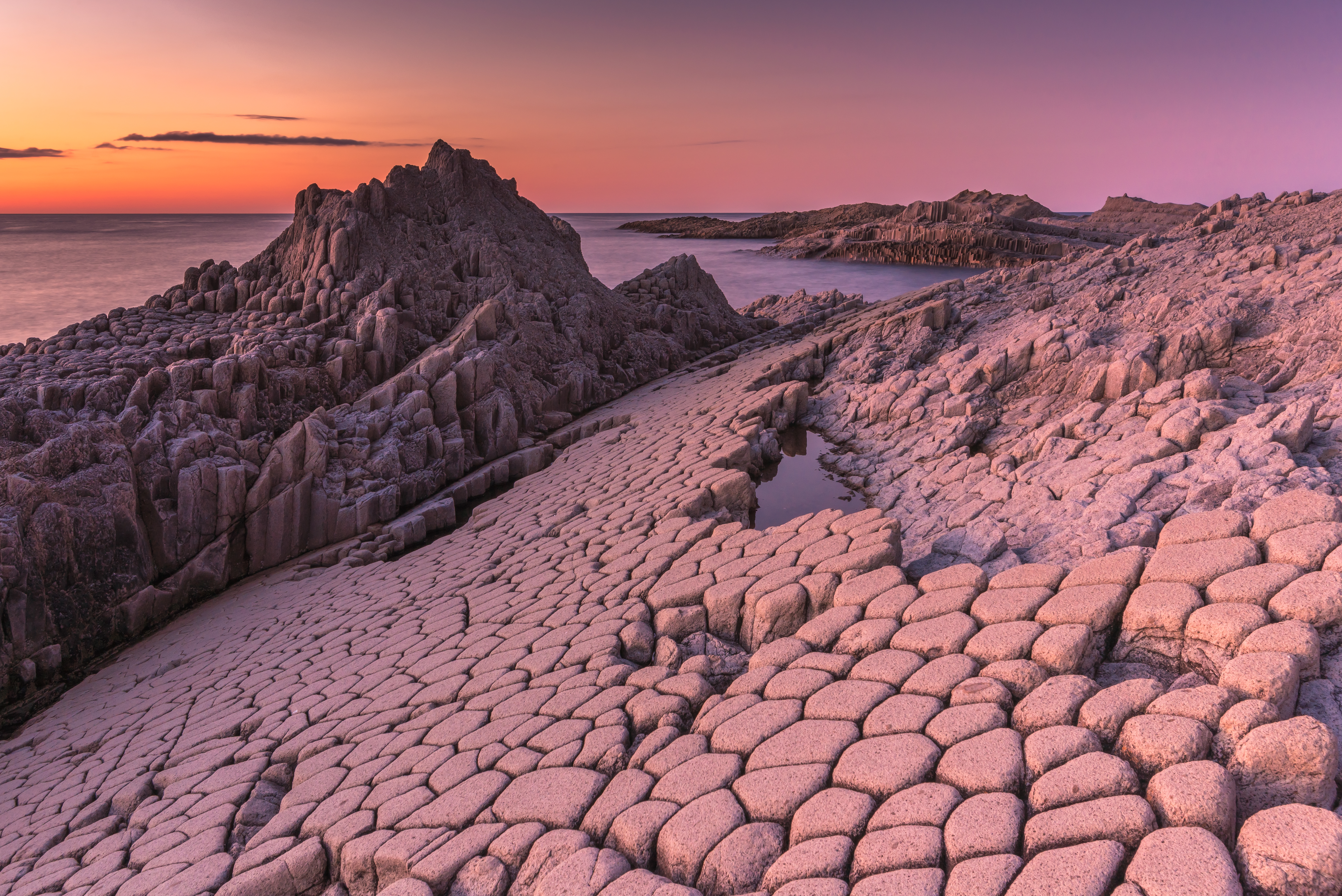
- Interactive map of Cape Stolbchaty
- Location: Kuril Islands, Sakhalin Oblast, Russia
- Coordinates: 44°1′30″N 145°40′33″E

Cape Stolbchaty (Russian: мыс Столбчатый, IPA: [mɨs ˈstoɫpt͡ɕɪtɨj], lit. 'Cape Columnar') is a geographic cape on the west shore of Kunashir Island, the southernmost of the Kuril Islands, in Sakhalin Oblast, Russia. It is famous for its columnar basalt formations, which are strikingly similar to the Giant's Causeway in County Antrim in Northern Ireland.

== See also ==
- Columnar basalts formation
- List of places with columnar jointed volcanics
