= Gerðuberg =

Cliff in Iceland

Coordinates: 64.860699°N 22.36139°W

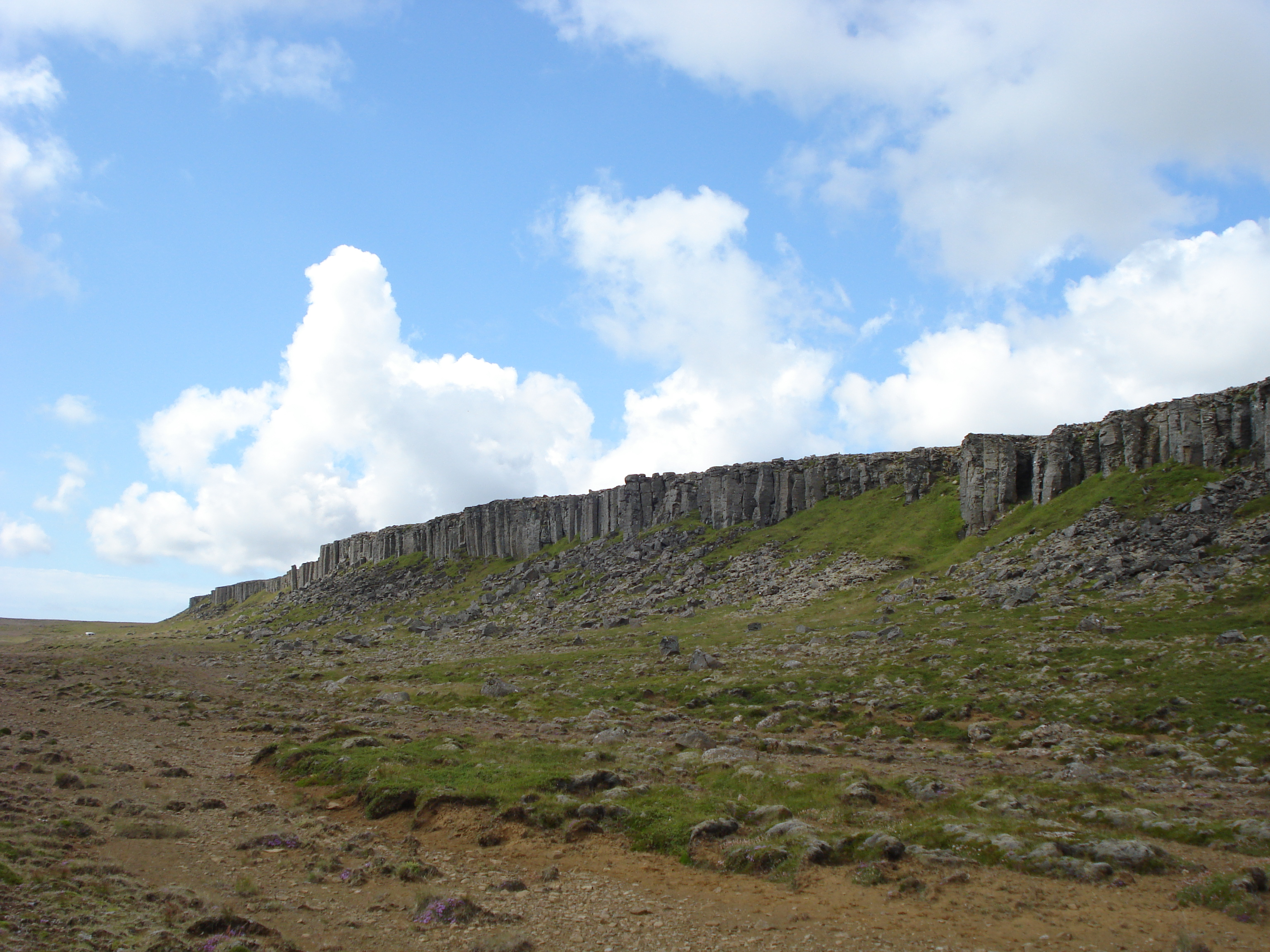
Gerðuberg in Snæfellsnes

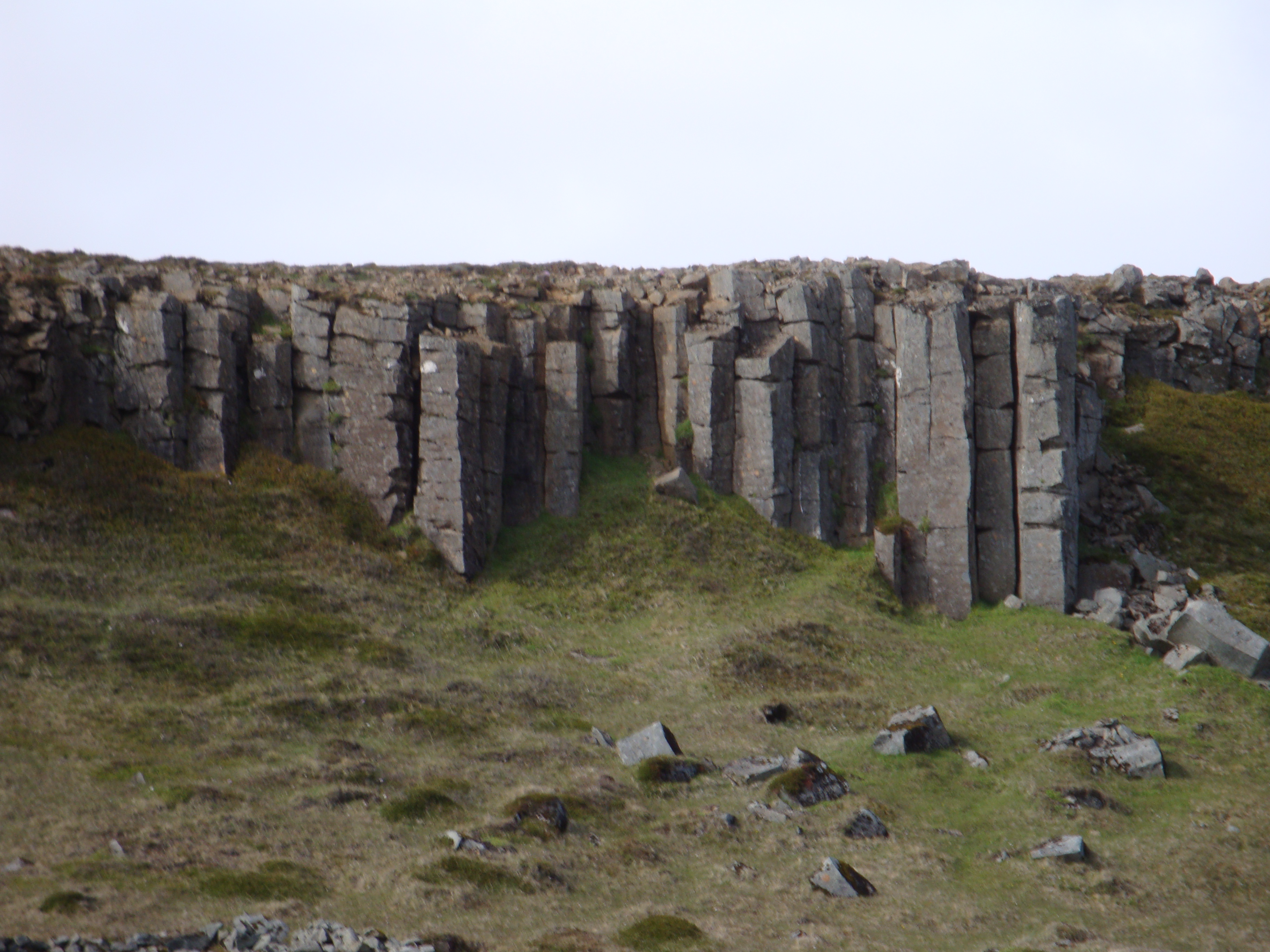
Gerðuberg basalt columns

Gerðuberg (Icelandic pronunciation: [ˈcɛrðʏˌpɛrk]; also transcribed Gerduberg) is a cliff of dolerite, a coarse-grained basalt rock, located on western peninsula Snæfellsnes and on the western edge of the Hnappadalur [ˈn̥ahpaˌtaːlʏr̥] valley, 46 km in the north of the town of Borgarnes and 115 km to Reykjavík.

Gerðuberg was formed from flowing basaltic lava, cooled by the sea, solidified in very evenly running columns. These are between 1 and 1.5 m wide and 7 to 14 m high.

== Near Gerðuberg ==
- Volcanic cone Eldborg
- a water source
- Löngufjörur [ˈlœyŋkʏˌfjœːrʏr̥] beach
- settlement Borg á Mýrum

== See also ==
- List of columnar basalts in Iceland
