= Lindenstumpf =

Coordinates: 50°17′N 9°52′E

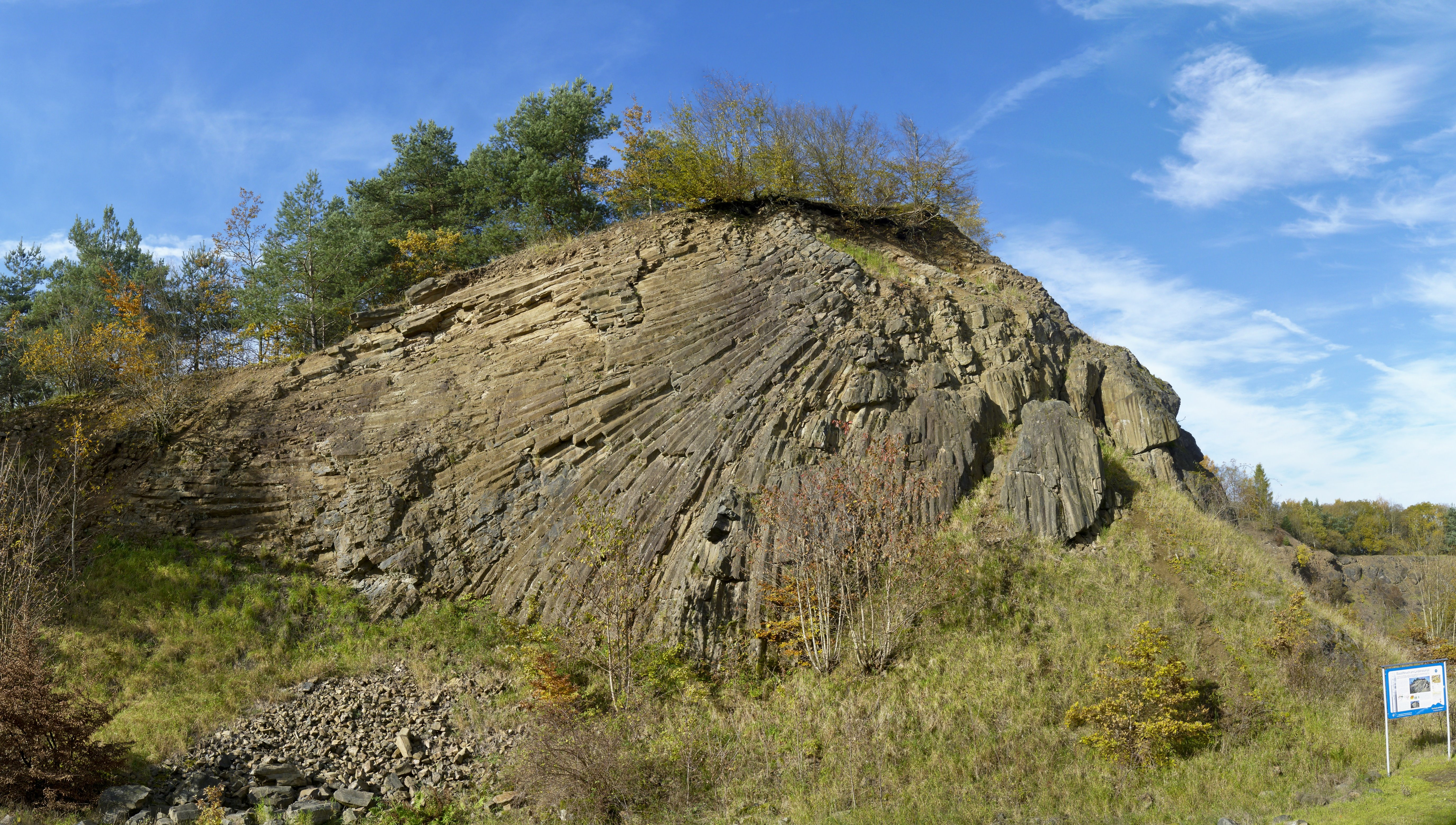

Highest point
- Elevation: 527 m (1,729 ft)

Geography
- Location: Bavaria, Germany

Lindenstumpf is a mountain of Bavaria, Germany.
