= Lavington, British Columbia =

Coordinates: 50°13′45.98″N 119°6′26.09″W

Lavington
- Community
- Interactive map of Lavington
- Country: Canada
- Province: British Columbia
- Region: Okanagan
- Regional district: North Okanagan
- Time zone: UTC−07:00 (PT)

Lavington is an unincorporated community located in the North Okanagan regional district and Okanagan region of British Columbia, Canada. It is home to Lavington Elementary School, which is part of School District 22 Vernon.

== School ==
Lavington Elementary School has about 170 children in preschool, kinder garden, and grades one through seven. It has a BGC Canada program currently running.

The school also houses a large Gym, with six Basketball hoops.

== Population ==
As of 2021, the estimated population of Lavington is about 800.

== Park ==
Lavington Centennial Park has had some construction in recent years, as new sprinkler systems were put and a Mavens Lane daycare was built. The Park hosts an Easter Egg Hunt every easter, although in recent years it has been canceled.
