= Mount Ashland Ski Area Expansion =

Proposed ski area enlargement in Ashland, Oregon

Coordinates: 42°5′14″N 122°43′8″W

The Mount Ashland Ski Area Expansion refers to a long-debated proposal by the Mount Ashland Association (MAA) to enlarge the ski area onto adjacent U.S. Forest Service land near Ashland, Oregon. First introduced in 1998, the plan included new ski terrain, a chairlift, a warming hut, and expanded parking. The proposal triggered extensive legal and environmental scrutiny due to its potential impact on old-growth forests, unstable terrain, and sensitive wildlife in the Ashland watershed. Over two decades, the expansion underwent multiple environmental reviews, court rulings, and public comment periods before partial implementation began in 2013. The approved project remains part of the ski area's master plan, though no further development has occurred as of 2020.

== History ==
In 1998, the Mount Ashland Association proposed an expansion of the Mount Ashland Ski Area on federal lands generally west and downslope of the existing ski area in the Middle Branch watershed of the East Fork of Ashland Creek. The proposal included construction of a warming hut near the base of the glacial moraine known as "The Bowl," a new chairlift in the Middle Branch watershed serving 72 acres (290,000 m^{2}) of new intermediate and advanced terrain, and 200 additional parking spaces.

Local conservation groups objected to the expansion plan, citing concerns about the effects of soil erosion on streams and wetlands in Ashland's Municipal Watershed, as well as concerns for the Old-growth forest, Inventoried roadless area and sensitive wildlife such as the Pacific fisher (animal) that exist in the proposed expansion area.

In February 2000, the United States Forest Service issued a draft Environmental Impact Statement (EIS) considering the Mt. Ashland expansion proposal. The draft EIS drew over 6,000 public comments, about half of which supported the MAA plan and half opposed.

In June 2001, Jack Williams, supervisor of the Rogue River-Siskiyou National Forest, announced preparation of a second draft EIS to address substantive public comment regarding alternatives to the Mt. Ashland proposal.

In July 2003, the Forest Service issued its second draft EIS on expansion, this one with a broader range of alternatives. The first option was no action. The second option was Mt. Ashland's expansion proposal. The third option would develop half of the Mt. Ashland proposal on the east side of the Middle Branch watershed, and avoid development on the west side of that creek, thereby reducing impacts to the McDonald Peak Inventoried roadless area. The fourth option would develop new ski facilities east of the existing ski area on "The Knoll," instead of in the Middle Branch watershed. The fifth option was a community proposal to develop the ski area largely within its existing footprint. The sixth option slightly modified the Mt. Ashland proposal with different ski run placement and a wetland crossing design introduced by the Forest Service. The second draft EIS drew a similar level of public comment as the first one, with about 50 percent favoring the Mt. Ashland plan and half opposed or supportive of other alternatives.

In September 2004, forest supervisor Scott Conroy issued a Final Environmental Impact Statement (FEIS) and a Record of Decision (ROD) that approved a blend of alternatives 2 and 6 incorporating most elements of the original MAA expansion proposal. The Forest Service received 28 notices of appeal and denied all of them.

In January 2005, three organizations—Oregon Natural Resources Council, Headwaters and Sierra Club—and an individual, Eric Navickas, filed suit in the U.S. District Court of Oregon alleging that the ROD approving the expansion violated the National Forest Management Act (NFMA) and the National Environmental Policy Act (NEPA). In February 2007, District Judge Owen M. Panner granted summary judgment to the Forest Service stating, "You cannot make an omlette without breaking a few eggs."

ONRC, Headwaters and Sierra Club, but not Navickas, appealed Panner's judgment to the U.S. Court of Appeals for the Ninth Circuit. A motions panel of the appellate court issued a preliminary injunction that prevented implementation of the expansion while the conservation groups' appeal was under review. The motions panel cited a likelihood of irreparable harm to the City of Ashland's water quality, and to sensitive Pacific fisher (animal), a rare forest carnivore known to exist in the expansion area.

In September 2007, a three-judge panel of the Court of Appeals ruled in an opinion written by Circuit Judge Milan Smith that the Forest Service violated federal law in four ways when it approved the ski area expansion. Specifically, the 2004 ROD approving expansion:

1. Violated the Rogue River National Forest Plan and the NFMA by failing to designate and manage geologically unstable landslide terrain as Riparian Reserve.
2. Violated the Rogue River National Forest Plan and the NFMA by failing to recognise and observe mandatory soil disturbance limits on Restricted Watershed lands.
3. Violated the Rogue River National Forest Plan and the NFMA with an arbitrary and capricious biological evaluation of effects to Pacific fisher.
4. Violated the NEPA by failing to disclose significant cumulative effects to the Siskiyou Crest biological corridor used by Pacific fisher.

The appellate opinion specifically noted that the Aquatic Conservation Strategy of the Northwest Forest Plan "prohibits the Forest Service from 'using mitigation or planned restoration as a substitute for preventing habitat degradation' within Riparian Reserves, and explains that 'priority must be given to protecting existing high-quality habitat' rather than compensating for management actions that degrade existing habitat through mitigation and restoration." It remanded the case to the District Court with instruction to enjoin the ski area expansion "until the Forest Service has corrected the NFMA and NEPA violations we find in this opinion."

In October 2007, Linda Duffy, ranger of the Siskiyou Mountains Ranger District, announced the Forest Service would produce a supplemental EIS to remedy legal violations identified by the Court of Appeals.

In May 2011, the Forest Service issued a Final Supplemental Environmental Impact Statement (FSEIS) for the Mt. Ashland Ski Area Expansion. The FSEIS identified approximately 67 acres of Riparian Reserve on geologically unstable lands including multiple locations where the expansion would directly impact hazardous landslide terrain. It further disclosed that expansion would render approximately 500 acres of forest habitat unusable to Pacific fisher.

Concurrent with the 2011 FSEIS, forest supervisor Conroy issued a Supplemental Record of Decision affirming the 2004 ROD without modification. Subsequently, Judge Panner lifted the court's injunction.

In 2013, the Mt. Ashland Ski Area successfully implemented several projects identified in its expansion plans, including a 20% increase to its parking lot capacity, widening the Sonnet beginner ski run and several other ski runs.

In October 2016, a three-judge panel of the Ninth Circuit U.S. Court of Appeals granted summary judgment to the Forest Service in a separate complaint filed by Oregon Wild, Sierra Club and Center for Biological Diversity, holding the federal agency was not required to produce another impact statement on the expansion project.

== Current ski area expansion planning ==
As of September 2020, the Mt. Ashland Association has made no public announcements of plans to develop additional ski trails in the East Fork of Ashland Creek. The proposed expansion is considered part of the ski area's active master plan and has been approved by all required entities.
