= Hellinsia helianthi =

Scientific classification
- Domain: Eukaryota
- Kingdom: Animalia
- Phylum: Arthropoda
- Class: Insecta
- Order: Lepidoptera
- Family: Pterophoridae
- Genus: Hellinsia
- Species: H. helianthi

Binomial name
- Hellinsia helianthi (Walsingham, 1880)

Synonyms
- Lioptilus helianthi Walsingham, 1880; Alucita helianthi; Oidaematophora helianthi

Species of plume moth

Hellinsia helianthi (sunflower plume moth) is a moth of the family Pterophoridae. It is found in North America in California (including the type location, the Siskiyou Mountains), Colorado, British Columbia and Alberta.

The wingspan is 21-29.5 mm. The head is brown, but whitish between the antennae. These are whitish with brown dots above. The thorax is concolorous with the forewings and the abdomen is similar above with dark gray brown dorsal dots, forming a broken dorsal line. The forewings are brownish white to tawny with some scattered dark brown scales. There is sometimes a small dot near middle of the cell and a dark dash on the costa over the base of the cleft, but both are often lacking. A short distance before the cleft and slightly toward the inner margin there is a rounded dark brown spot, rather well defined, which may be extended as much as halfway to the costa by an oblique line of dark scales. The fringes are concolorous, those in the cleft with dark areas. The hindwings are gray brown and the fringes are slightly more tawny.

The larvae feed on Helianthus species.
