= Isabel Pearl =

Defunct restaurant in Portland, Oregon, U.S.

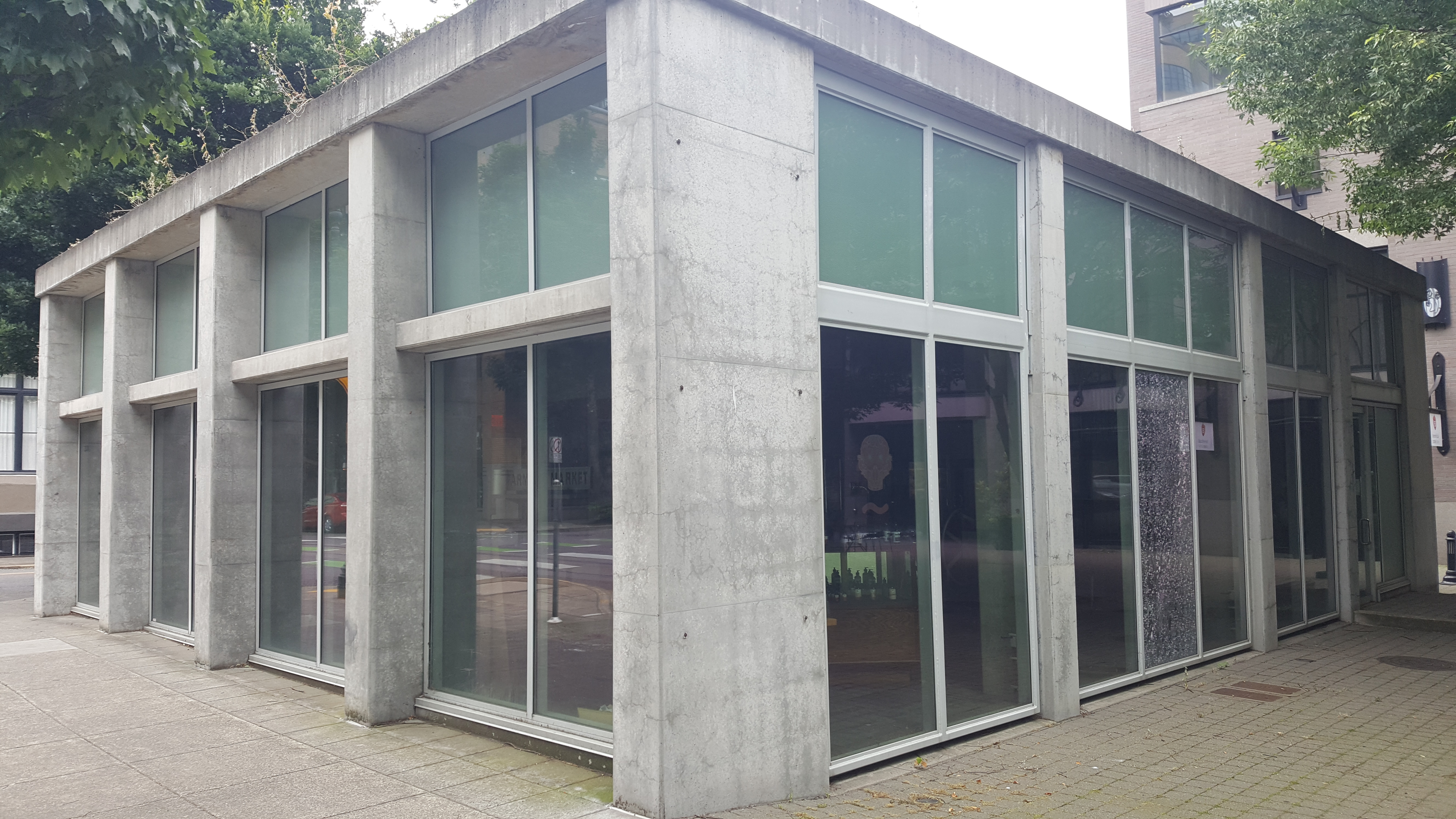
- Exterior of the building which previously housed Isabel Pearl, 2022
- Interactive map of Isabel Pearl

Restaurant information
- Owner: Isabel Cruz
- Chef: Isabel Cruz
- Food type: Latin-Asian fusion
- Location: 330 Northwest 10th Avenue, Portland, Multnomah, Oregon, 97209, United States
- Coordinates: 45.5257°N 122.6811°W

Isabel Pearl, or simply Isabel, was a Latin-Asian fusion restaurant in Portland, Oregon's Pearl District, in the United States.

== Description ==
Named after chef-owner Isabel Cruz, Isabel Pearl was located at the intersection of 10th and Flanders in northwest Portland's Pearl District. The restaurant was attached to a condominium. Frommer's described Isabel Pearl as a "glass-walled jewel-box of a restaurant" offering "big, creative" breakfasts. Portland Monthly described Isabel Pearl as "Latin-Asian fusion done up in a distinctly boxy building" and said the restaurant was "known best for a strong brunch and a wicked blood orange mimosa". Michael Russell of The Oregonian said Isabel Pearl was part of a San Diego–based chain and also described the menu as Latin-Asian fusion.

The coconut French toast was served with a raspberry purée. The Omar Special had scrambled egg whites, cheese, green onions, tomatoes, grilled chicken, and mushrooms, and was served with brown rice and a sauce made of avocado, cilantro, and lime. The avocado scramble had black beans, cheese, jalapeños, and rosemary potatoes. The menu also included roast beef hash. The happy hour menu included draught beers, cocktails, and small bowls of rice and beans. According to Kevin Max of 1859 magazine, the restaurant used "as much produce as possible" from its farm in Sandy. Isabel Pearl had a poster of Cruz and her cookbooks for sale.

== History ==
In 2012, the Elizabeth Lofts Condominium Owners Association filed a lawsuit in Multnomah County Circuit Court against the restaurant's parent company Isabel LLC. The association sought $3,748.83 in unpaid dues plus "assessments, late fees and other charges".

== Reception ==
In an overview of Portland's best restaurants, Frommer's recommended the coconut French toast or pesto scramble. Kevin Max of 1859 also recommended the coconut French toast.

Willamette Week's Mike Thelin said Isabel Pearl showcased Cruz's "own brand of California Asian-Latin fusion" with offerings "as cutting edge as Michael Dukakis". He wrote, "There seems to be a pattern: Avocado for color and good fat, black beans for fiber, tomatoes for zing, rosemary for flavor; all bound together by what's straightforwardly referred to on the menu as 'cheese'—seven times on the breakfast menu alone." In 2007, Thelin opined, "The fare is neither innovative nor memorable, but Isabel provides the Pearl District with another healthy breakfast and lunch option ... and the neighborhood response has been good so far." He said options were "well priced", apart from the orange juice, and wrote, "In today's Pearl—where I'm pretty sure personal trainers outnumber working artists these days—Isabel's could do quite well."

In Moon Portland, Hollyanna McCollom wrote, "Isabel Cruz, the California-based chef and owner of this smallish Pearl District fusion café, draws influct from Puerto Rican, Cuban, Mexican, Japanese, and Thai cooking. While lettuce wraps and edamame alongside carnitas may seem strange, Cruz manages to make it work. Her food is akin to spa food—elegant, colorful, and oftentimes quite good for you." McCollom recommended, "Order Cruz's signature Crispy Dragon Potatoes as a breakfast entrée with eggs and bacon or as an appetizer. For dinner, the Big Bowls are always reliable. The menu also includes a decent happy hour, but the breakfast and lunch offerings are still more extensive."
