= 1859 Oregon's Magazine =

American lifestyle magazine

- 1859 magazine, Winter 2012
- Editor: Kevin Max
- Categories: Regional magazine
- Frequency: Bi-monthly
- Publisher: Kevin Max
- First issue: Summer 2009
- Company: Statehood Media
- Country: United States
- Based in: Bend, Oregon
- Language: English
- Website: 1859magazine.com
- OCLC: 489252235

1859 Oregon's Magazine is a bi-monthly lifestyle magazine based in Bend, Oregon whose mission is to "Live, Think, Explore". Named for Oregon's year of statehood, the publication was established in Bend, Oregon in the summer of 2009, largely the brainchild of Kevin Max and Heather Johnson.

== Publication details ==
=== Launch ===
1859 Oregon's Magazine is run by a small staff in Bend, Oregon. Kevin Max is the chief content officer.

Kevin Max, a New York City financial journalist, relocated to Oregon and founded the magazine. While working as a journalist around the state, Max was inspired by historic buildings dating back to the year of Oregon's statehood, 1859, and by the prominence of the year on the Oregon flag.

Despite the difficult economic situation prevalent at the time of its 2009 launch — a moment at which American magazines were experiencing a 26% decline in ad revenue over previous-year figures — 1859 Oregon's Magazine experienced initial success powered by its placement in Borders Books, Barnes & Noble, and the grocery chain Whole Foods. The magazine's debut issue saw a total of 30,000 copies produced.

1859 found its niche covering statewide arts and culture, adventure and exploration, and focussing on Oregon as a whole rather than any single region or city. The magazine grew from a quarterly to a bi-monthly publication in 2012 and in 2017 Max launched a sister publication, 1889 Washington's Magazine, a journal of statewide culture in Washington state.

Statehood Media continues to expand upon its original mission statement exploring statewide culture and community.

=== Content ===
1859 relies upon freelance writers and photographers for a majority of its content. Other regular content features are produced by members of the publication's staff.

The magazine covers stories dealing with the length and breadth of the state of Oregon, from the Pacific Coast to high desert of Eastern Oregon. The magazine deals with both geographical and biographical material, including both contemporary and historical content. The publication has been characterized as "a National Geographic for the state of Oregon."

The publication touts Oregon for "a wealth of recreational, ecological, historical and entrepreneurial intrigue," including residents who are "pioneers in the sustainable movement, bike geeks and techies, Native Americans and cowboys, financiers and vintners."

=== Sustainability philosophy ===
1859 has been outspoken in its promotion of the concept of sustainability, making use of soy-based ink, and supporting Oregon wildlife protection by means of a campaign through which half of the magazine's subscription price was targeted to the conservation group Oregon Wild.

=== Honors ===
In April 2011, 1859 was nominated for a Maggie Award in the category "Best New Quarterly Magazine" by the Maggie Awards Committee of the Western Publishing Association in Los Angeles. The nomination, based upon inspection of publication's Autumn 2010 issue, was based upon ten specific editorial aspects involving cover design, layout, typography, and editorial content.

1859 Oregon's Magazine won the 68th Annual Maggie Awards Best Consumer Publication and Best State/Regional Publication in 2020. Its sister publication, 1889 Washington's Magazine, took Best Special Interest Publication 2020.
