= Bear Mountain (Siskiyou County, California) =

Mountain in California, United States

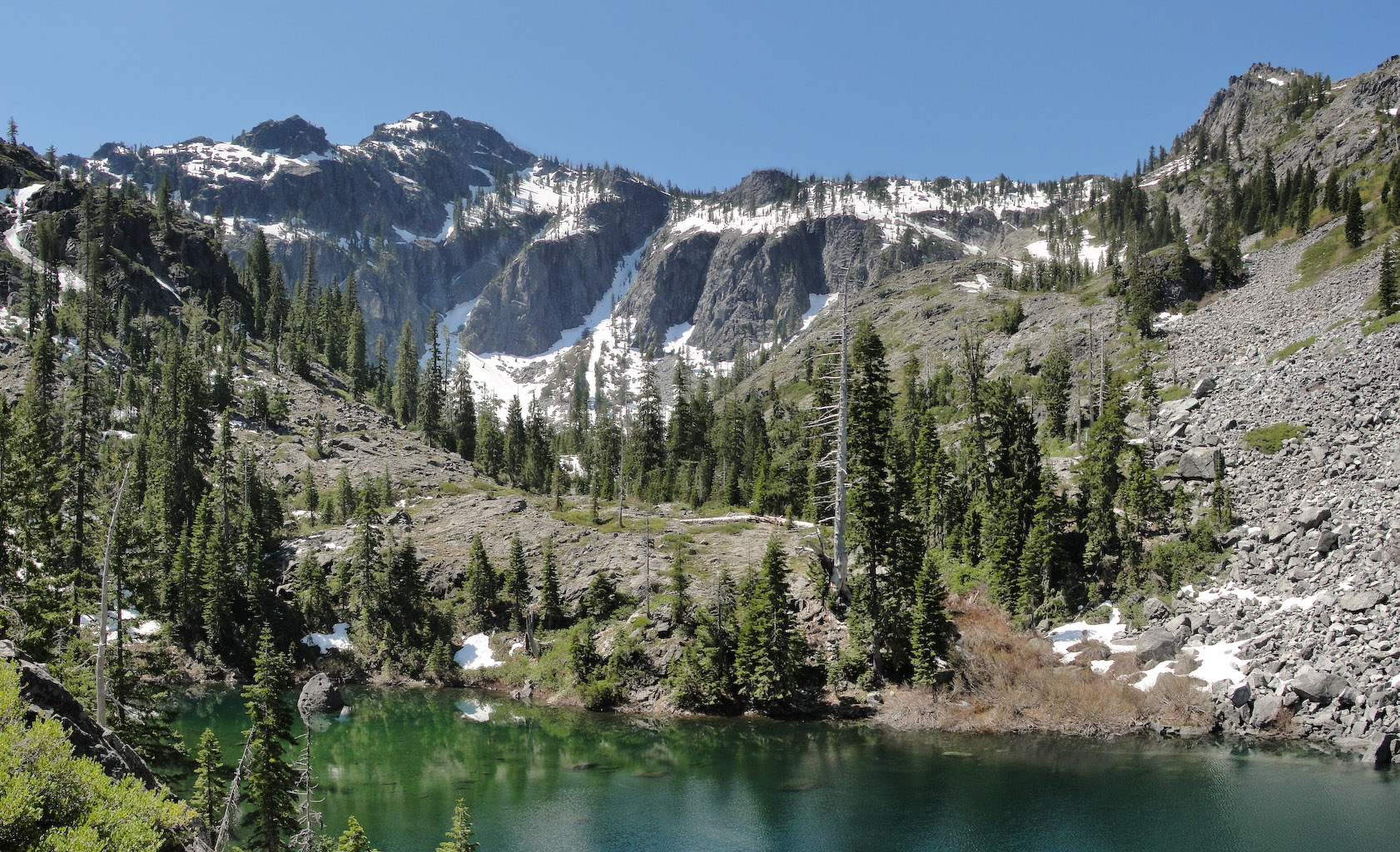
- Bear Mountain and the tarn below Devils Punchbowl

Highest point
- Elevation: 6,415 ft (1,955 m) NAVD 88
- Prominence: 2,251 ft (686 m)
- Listing: California county high points 35th
- Coordinates: 41°47′46″N 123°40′19″W

Geography
- Location within California
- Location: Del Norte and Siskiyou counties, California, U.S.
- Parent range: Siskiyou Mountains
- Topo map: USGS Devils Punchbowl

Bear Mountain is a mountain located in the Siskiyou Mountains of Northern California in the United States. The summit, located in Siskiyou County, is at an elevation of 6,415 feet (1,955 m). The highest point in Del Norte County is located just west of the summit at about 6404+ feet (1952+ meters). The mountain is in the Siskiyou Wilderness and straddles the county boundary, which also separates the Six Rivers and Klamath national forests. A cirque named Devils Punchbowl containing a tarn is located on the mountain's north side. Due to its location near the Pacific Ocean, the mountain normally receives tremendous snowfall during the winter.

== Climate ==
Climate data for Bear Mountain, California
Month	Jan	Feb	Mar	Apr	May	Jun	Jul	Aug	Sep	Oct	Nov	Dec	Year
Mean daily maximum °F (°C)	40.7 (4.8)	41.1 (5.1)	43.5 (6.4)	47.5 (8.6)	56.3 (13.5)	64.8 (18.2)	75.3 (24.1)	75.3 (24.1)	69.4 (20.8)	57.2 (14.0)	44.4 (6.9)	39.2 (4.0)	54.6 (12.5)
Mean daily minimum °F (°C)	27.8 (−2.3)	26.8 (−2.9)	27.2 (−2.7)	29.2 (−1.6)	35.5 (1.9)	41.8 (5.4)	50.6 (10.3)	50.8 (10.4)	46.6 (8.1)	38.9 (3.8)	31.4 (−0.3)	27.3 (−2.6)	36.2 (2.3)
Average precipitation inches (mm)	22.78 (579)	19.86 (504)	17.59 (447)	13.69 (348)	10.49 (266)	3.15 (80)	1.11 (28)	1.47 (37)	2.32 (59)	11.25 (286)	18.69 (475)	31.03 (788)	153.43 (3,897)
Source: PRISM
