= Preston Peak =

Mountain in the state of California

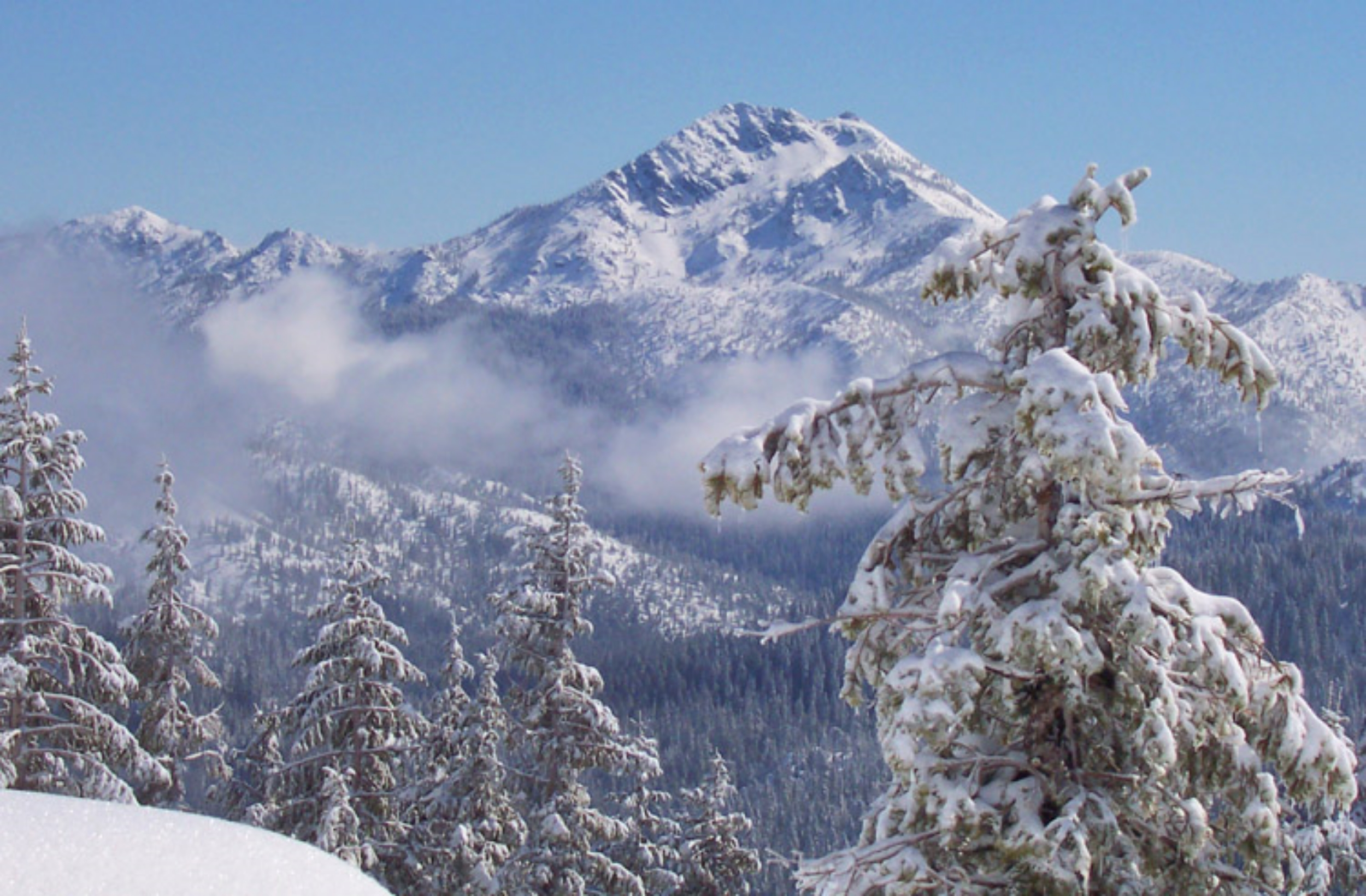
- South face of Preston Peak

Highest point
- Elevation: 7,313 ft (2,229 m) NAVD 88
- Prominence: 2,509 ft (765 m)
- Coordinates: 41°50′06″N 123°36′43″W

Geography
- Location: Siskiyou County, California, U.S.
- Parent range: Siskiyou Mountains
- Topo map: USGS Preston Peak

Preston Peak (Karuk: keech'íihyan), is a dominant feature of the Siskiyou Wilderness in the Klamath National Forest in northern California, U.S. Many peaks in the wilderness rise to over 6,000 feet (1,800 m) but none comes to within 500 feet (150 m) of approaching the height of Preston Peak. From the summit on a clear day, the Pacific Ocean is visible along with peaks in the Klamath Mountains and Cascade Range.

John Hart, in his book Hiking the Bigfoot Country says of the peak:

At a mile and some above sea level it is by no means the highest peak in the Klamath Mountains...Yet there is no mountain in northern California which I remember with more pleasure. They say that early travellers on the Klamath River, glimpsing the mountain above them, thought it was 10,000 feet tall.

== Designation ==
The Forest Service designated the peak and watershed around the peak the Preston Peak Botanical and Geological Area because of the rare plants and associations of plants that can be found. Here the Alaska cedar and noble fir reach the southern terminus of their range and share habitat with the northwest California endemic Brewer spruce and Port Orford cedar. There is also an interesting population of high-elevation Pacific yew on the peak that, along with a few other populations in the Klamath Mountains, may justify reclassification as at least a subspecies. A few other rare plants living on or around the peak are the phantom orchid and Siskiyou fritillary.
