= Siskiyou Mountains =

Mountain range in Oregon and California, US

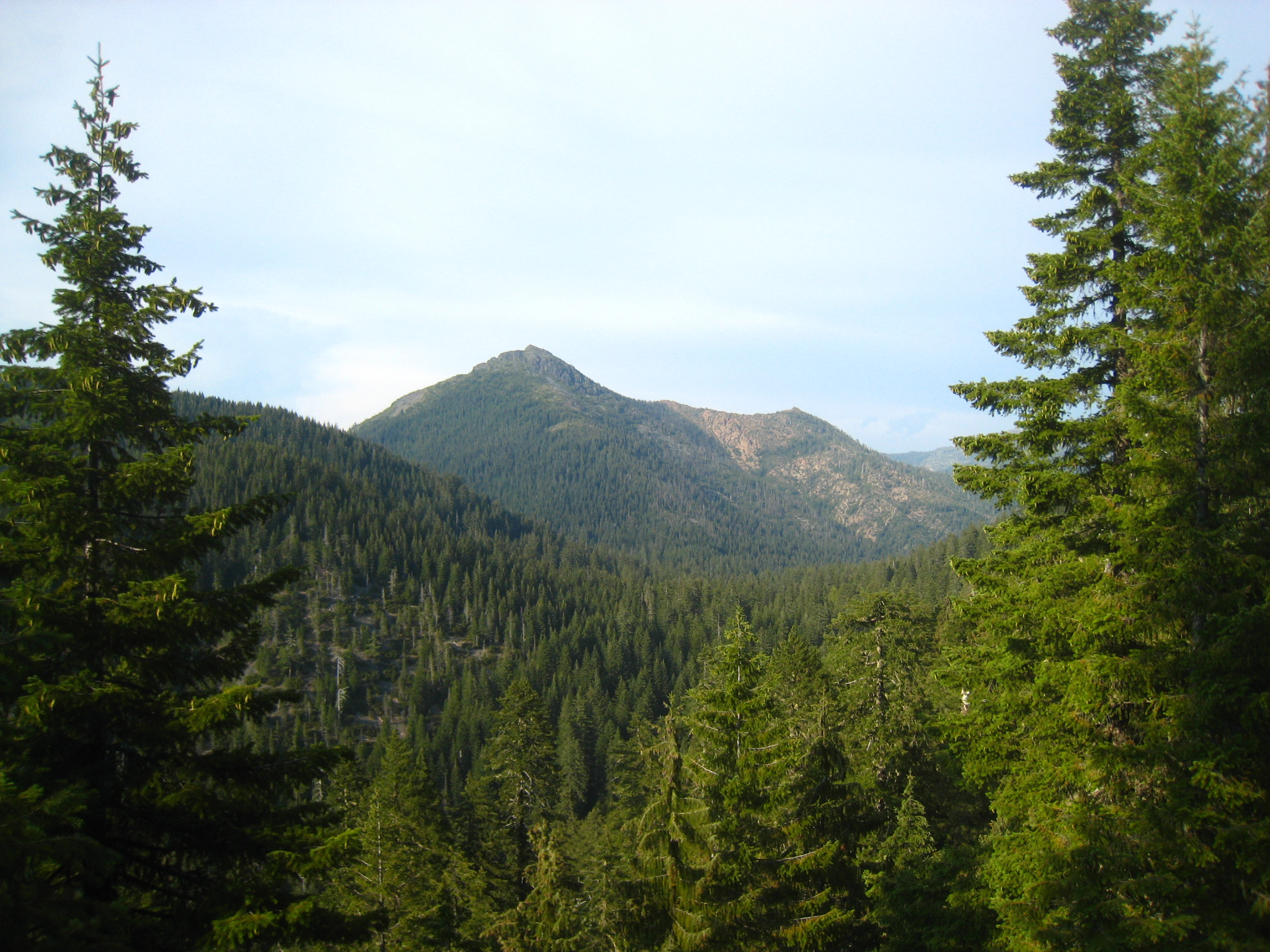
- Forest in the Siskiyou Mountains in California

Highest point
- Peak: Mount Ashland
- Elevation: 7,532 ft (2,296 m)
- Coordinates: 42°04′51″N 122°43′02″W

Geography
- Location within California
- Country: United States
- States: Oregon; California
- Counties: Del Norte County, California; Siskiyou County, California; Jackson County, Oregon; Josephine County, Oregon
- Range coordinates: 41°49′59″N 123°40′04″W

The Siskiyou Mountains are a coastal subrange of the Klamath Mountains, and located in northwestern California and southwestern Oregon in the United States. They extend in an arc for approximately 100 miles (160 km) from east of Crescent City, California, northeast along the north side of the Klamath River into Josephine and Jackson counties in Oregon. The mountain range forms a barrier between the watersheds of the Klamath River to the south and the Rogue River to the north. Accordingly, much of the range is within the Rogue River – Siskiyou and Klamath national forests, and the Pacific Crest Trail follows a portion of the crest of the Siskiyous.

These mountains are not the highest of the Klamath Mountains, but because of the relief so close to the Pacific Ocean, the peaks receive significant precipitation from the ocean, including wintertime snow on the peaks. Western canyons can receive over 100 inches (2,500 mm) of rain in some winters and are densely forested, while eastern areas are more arid. The greatly varied topography and climate contribute to high biodiversity, and the Siskiyous are noted for a number of endemic species.

== Name origins ==
The origin of the word siskiyou is unclear. One version is that it is the Chinook Jargon word for "bob-tailed horse". According to historian Richard Mackie, "siskiyou" was a Cree word for a bob-tailed horse, one of which perished in 1829 during Alexander McLeod's journey over a pass later named for the "siskiyou" (today's Siskiyou Pass). The Cree were in the area as part of McLeod's Hudson's Bay Company expedition, and had been recruited far away in their homeland in eastern Canada. Another version, given in an argument before the State Senate in 1852, is that the French name Six Cailloux, meaning "six-stones", was given to a ford on the Umpqua River by Michel Laframboise and a party of Hudson's Bay Company trappers in 1832, because six large stones or rocks lay in the river where they crossed. According to some, the Six Cailloux name was appropriated to this region by Stephen Meek, another Hudson's Bay Company trapper who was known for his "discovery" of Scott Valley, in regard to a crossing on the Klamath River near Hornbrook. Still, others attribute the name to the multiple nations of Native Americans.

== History ==
Indigenous People from multiple Nations that share geography with California and Oregon speaking the Athapaskan Language lived along the Rogue River prior to 1850. These communities were primarily winter residences, and the Indigenous People likely spent much of the summer in the mountains.

=== Early Colonization ===
Most early colonization of the area came from the coast, beginning in 1775, when the Spanish lieutenant Bruno de Heceta came to the Northwest. He would be followed in 1791 and 1792 by other colonizers like captain George Vancouver, James Baker, and Robert Gray. The early western overland colonizations all avoided the area around the Oregon–California border. The first land-based colonization came when the North West Company came to the area in 1820, followed by the Hudson's Bay Company in 1821.

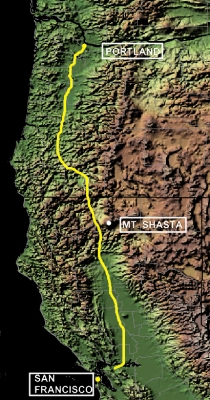
The Siskiyou Trail

The Siskiyou Trail stretched from California's Central Valley through the Siskiyous to Oregon's Willamette Valley. Originally based on existing foot trails made by Native American that share geography with California and Oregon speaking the Athapaskan Language, winding their way through river valleys, the Siskiyou Trail provided the shortest practical travel path between early settlements in California and Oregon in the 1820s.

=== New Colonization and early industry ===
As colonization increased with a variety of new incentives, tensions over relations with Indigenous People from multiple Nations that share geography with California and Oregon already living in the area increased. In the 1850s, following the Donation Land Claim Act, miners came to the area to prospect for gold. Thousands of miners flooded into the area as profitable claims were made. The new settlements grew enough for Jackson County to be founded, with its seat in Jacksonville, in 1853. The large and sudden influx of white population deteriorated the relationship with the natives in the area. This led to the 1855 Rogue River Wars, which ended in 1856.

The new population of colonists needed to be supported by an improved infrastructure. By 1859, the trail had been replaced by a toll road. A telegraph line was built over the summit in 1864. By the end of the 1870s, the first private lumber mills were established in the mountains had been established in some of the lower creeks. Commercial orchards began to be planted in 1885. The Southern Pacific Railroad was completed over Siskiyou Summit in 1887. The new railroads were focused around Medford.

=== Industry develops ===
The Klamath Lake Railroad Company built a railroad into Pokegama from 1900 to 1903. It became a vital part of the lumber industry and was acquired by Weyerhaeuser in 1905. Irrigation projects that began at the end of the 19th century led to a boom in the fruit orchard industry. Apple blights around 1900 diminished the crop and pears began to be a major crop. By 1910, pears had begun to replace apples as the major fruit grown in the region. In 1927, the Jackson County seat moved to Medford, which had become much larger than Jacksonville.

== Geography ==
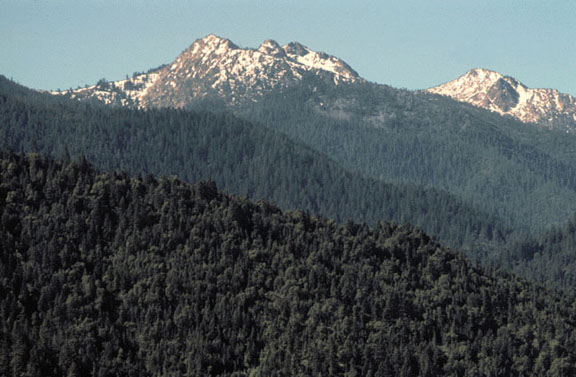
The Red Buttes in the Siskiyou Mountains

The highest peaks in the range include Mount Ashland at an elevation of 7,533 feet (2,296 m), Dutchman Peak at 7,410 feet (2,260 m), Siskiyou Peak at 7,147 feet (2,178 m), and Wagner Butte at 7,140 feet (2,180 m), all of which are in Oregon. The highest peak in the California portion of the range is Preston Peak at 7,309 feet (2,228 m). There are also several lower mountains, including Ben Johnson Mountain, which reaches 4,398 feet (1,341 m). The main drainage basins in the mountains are those of the Rogue and Klamath rivers.

=== Siskiyou Summit ===
Interstate 5 passes through the Siskiyou Mountains at Siskiyou Summit, located just north of the Oregon-California border, and just south of Ashland, Oregon. Siskiyou Summit is the highest pass on Interstate 5, at 4,310 feet (1,310 m). This pass is one of the most treacherous in the Interstate highway system. The California side has a more gradual slope than the Oregon side, where the freeway climbs or descends 2,300 feet (700 m) in elevation over about 7 miles (11 km). In addition, the pass includes several hazardous curves, and is frequently hit with snow, ice, and fog during winter storms. In winter, it is common for the highway to be closed one to four times per year by transportation authorities because of hazardous conditions. The speed limit is 55 miles per hour (89 km/h), but lower limits are set for larger vehicles.

== Climate ==
The climate of the mountains is distinctive in how it varies from the coast to the inland slopes. Generally, the mountains see milder temperatures and more precipitation nearer to the coast. The interior is drier and warmer in the summer months, and the eastern slopes resemble an interior climate.

The coast tends to receive about 60 inches (1,500 mm) of precipitation each year, rising to 100 inches (2,500 mm) at the peaks. The arid eastern areas receive around 30 inches (760 mm) annually. Precipitation is greatest in the winter and least in the summer. Fogs provide an additional source of water at low elevations near the coast, especially in summer. Most precipitation at lower elevations comes as rain. At higher elevations, snow is a major source of water.

Temperature tends to change most in the east–west direction because of the ocean's major influence. The mean annual temperature is around 11 to 11.5 °C (51.8 to 52.7 °F) at low elevations. Higher in the mountains and farther east, the temperatures range from overnight lows just above freezing to highs around 21 to 23 °C (70 to 73 °F).

== Ecology ==
There is considerable biodiversity within the Siskiyou Mountains, including extensive forests. Forests vary by elevation and relative locations, being primarily divided into mixed evergreen forests, montane forests, and subalpine forests.

=== Flora ===
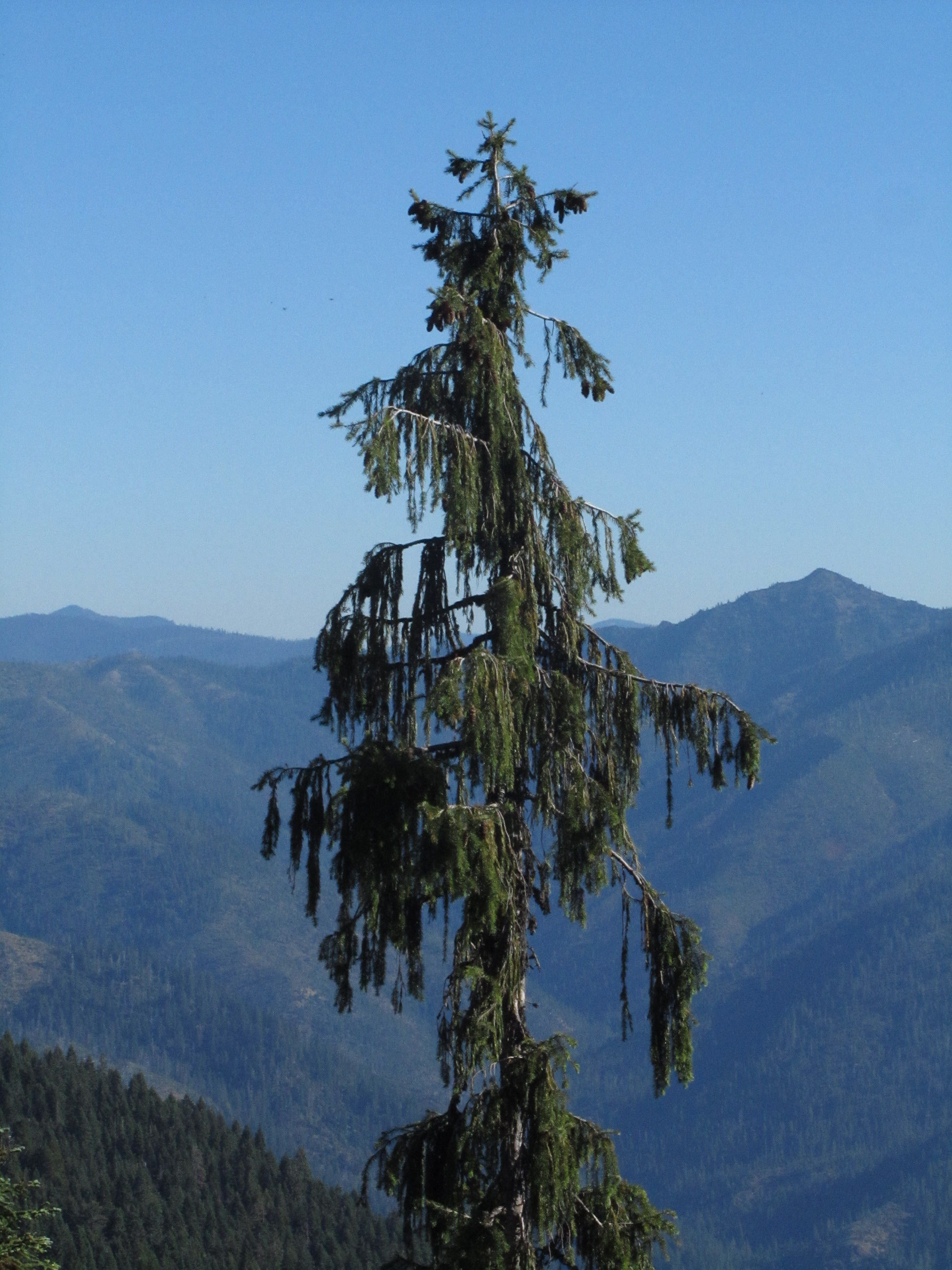
The weeping spruce (Picea breweriana) is native to only the Klamath Mountains.

The occurrences of tree species are divided by multiple forest types. Coast Douglas-fir (Pseudotsuga menziesii subsp. menziesii) occurs in both mixed evergreen and montane forests. Lawson's cypress (also known as Port Orford cedar, Chamaecypraris lawsoniana) occurs throughout the range west of the summit. California white fir (Abies concolor subsp. lowiana) occurs in montane and subalpine forests above 4,000 feet (1,200 m). In the montane forest, occurring in the snowzone, sugar pine (Pinus lambertiana) also occurs. The subalpine forests above 5,000 feet (1,500 m) include mountain hemlock (Tsuga mertensiana) and Shasta red fir (A. magnifica subsp. shastensis) in addition to Douglas-fir. Ponderosa pine (Pinus ponderosa) is dominant only in montane forests on steep south-facing slopes, but also grows with California black oak (Quercus kelloggii) and in mixed evergreen forests. Rare Pacific yew (Taxus brevifolia) grow at low elevations or at higher elevations near sources of water. Other conifers include weeping spruce (Picea breweriana), an endemic species, and coast redwood (Sequoia sempervirens).

Various deciduous broadleaf trees grow in addition to the conifers. The largest extant California black oak is found in the Siskiyou Mountains. The blue oak, Quercus douglasii, is beyond its contiguous range; however, there are disjunctive populations of blue oak within the Siskiyou Mountains.

Invasive species have become a concern in some areas. Some of these include yellow starthistle and scotch broom. Starthistle has become a problem in the Siskiyous only in the last 20 years. It has little value to habitat and is able to outcompete many native plants. Purple loosestrife is a plant that is invasive to waterways.

=== Animals ===
The diversity of fauna in the region is exhibited by the number of amphibian, reptile, and avian species in the region. Many of the amphibian and reptiles are endemic species. The eponymous endangered Siskiyou Mountains salamander is found within this mountain range; there is also the Scott Bar salamander. The variety of habitats in the mountains contributes to the number of bird species in the area, because the birds have more variety of habitat available to them. However, many birds disperse from the area following the breeding season. These birds include the endangered spotted owl, which lives in forests up to 5,800 feet (1,800 m). Endangered salmon live in the Rogue and Klamath watersheds.

Mammals in the area include small rodents, deer and elk, and bear and coyote. Medium-sized mammals also live in the region, including red fox, gray fox, and weasel. Another rare animal is the fisher, a predatory medium-sized mammal that lives in old-growth forest.

== Protected areas ==
The Siskiyou Mountains have federal protection in several forms. Oregon Caves National Monument and Preserve protects 4,558 acres (18 km^{2}) in the northern part of the range south of Grants Pass, Oregon. The Cascade–Siskiyou National Monument protects 52,940 acres (214 km^{2}) at the junction of the Siskiyou and Cascade ranges. There are three designated wilderness areas in the range in Oregon and California—the Red Buttes Wilderness, which protects 19,940 acres (80.7 km^{2}); the Kalmiopsis Wilderness, which protects 179,755 acres (727.4 km^{2}); and the Siskiyou Wilderness, which protects 153,432 acres (620.9 km^{2}).

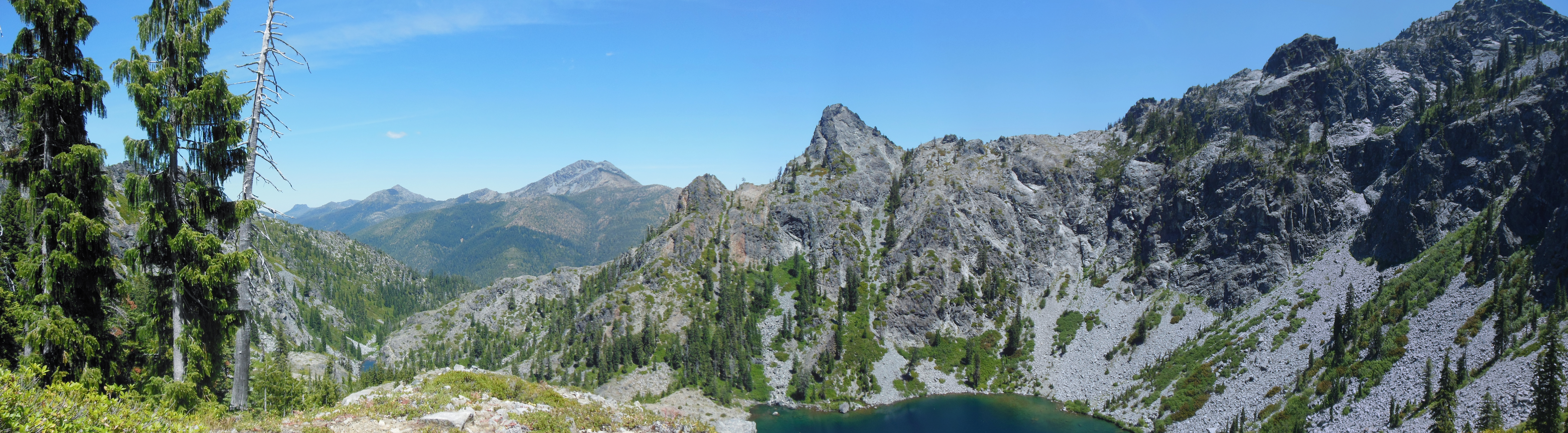
Panoramic view in the Siskiyou Wilderness, with Preston Peak in the distance and Bear Mountain at right
