= Young Fire =

2017 wildfire in Northern California

- Part of the 2017 California wildfires
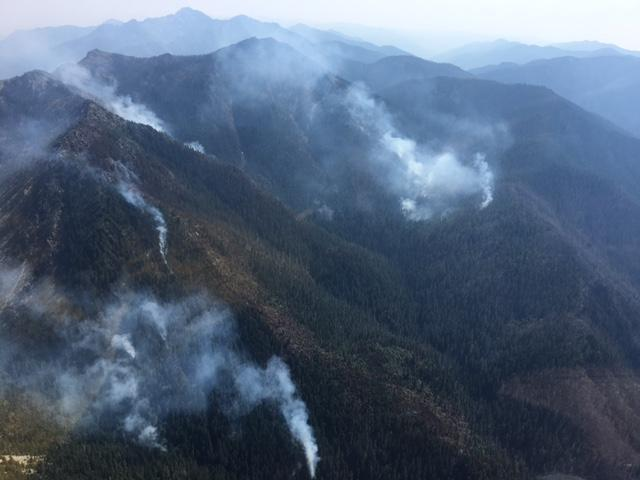
- Young Fire on August 20, 2017
- Date: August 7, 2017 –
- Location: Siskiyou Wilderness, California, United States
- Coordinates: 41.853°N 123.676°W

Statistics
- Burned area: 2,650 acres (11 km^{2})

Impacts
- Injuries: 2

Ignition
- Cause: Under investigation

Map
- Location of fire in California.

The Young Fire was a wildfire in the Siskiyou Wilderness in California in the United States. The fire was reported on August 7, 2017. The cause of the fire is currently unknown. As of August 28, the fire had burned 2,650 acres (11 km^{2}) and been added to the Eclipse Complex Fires. By September 1, the Young Fire entirely merged into the Oak Fire.

== Events ==
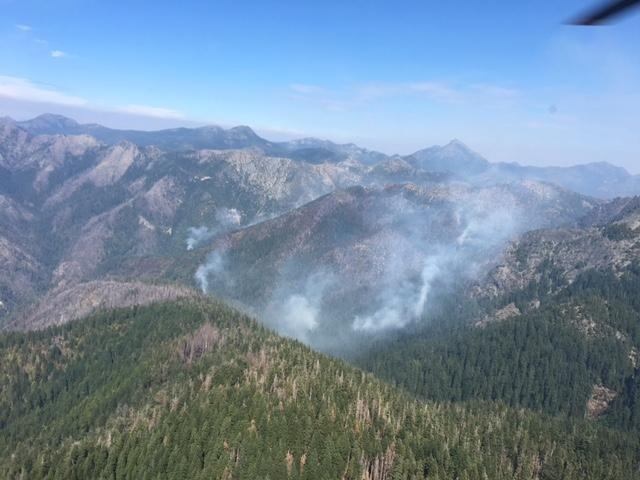
Young Fire on August 20, 2017

The Young Fire was reported on August 7 at 5:45 pm in the Siskiyou Wilderness of the Six Rivers National Forest. It was primarily in the Gasquet Ranger District, fueled by timber and brush.

By August 20, the Young Fire had burned 1,200 acres (5 km^{2}), with firefighters using a containment strategy for safety reasons, due to the remote location and difficult terrain. The fire burned around the south end of Twin Peaks and on the north end of Rocky Knob. Recreational areas were impacted at this time, with Doe Flat and Young's Valley Trailheads being closed. By the morning of August 21, the fire had expanded into the Klamath National Forest. Trailhead closures remained in place, with additional closures of the Six River Forest Boundary. The Young Fire grew to 1,950 acres (8 km^{2}) by August 23. By August 25, temporary flight restrictions were put in place due to the fire and all trails, roads and land near the fire was closed.

As of the morning of August 27, the fire had bumped into the scar from a 2015, which helped stop it from spreading. As of August 28, the fire had grown due to west winds, with an additional 50 acres expected to be burned. It spread into the Klamath National Forest and had destroyed 2,500 acres (10 km^{2}) (1,900 acres (8 km^{2}) in the Six Rivers National Forest and 600 acres (2 km^{2}) in the Klamath National Forest). A temporary flight restriction over the area was put in place. By August 29, the fire was merged into the Eclipse Complex Fires and the Oak Fire began creeping towards the Young Fire.

On September 1, the Young and Oak Fires merged.
