= Wagner Butte =

Mountain in Oregon, United States

Coordinates: 42°07′06″N 122°46′28″W

Wagner Butte is a summit in the U.S. state of Oregon. The elevation is 7,251 feet (2,210 m).

Wagner Butte was named in 1852 after one Jacob Wagner.
