= Mount Ashland Ski Area =

Ski area in Oregon, United States

Mt. Ashland Ski Area

- Location in Oregon Mt. Ashland Ski Area (the United States)
- Location: Mount Ashland, Oregon
- Nearest city: Ashland, Oregon
- Coordinates: 42°5′0″N 122°43′0″W
- Top elevation: 7,500 feet (2,286 m)
- Base elevation: 6,350 feet (1,940 m)
- Skiable area: 240 acres (97 ha)
- Trails: 23 total 15% beginner 35% intermediate 50% advanced plus open bowl skiing
- Longest run: 1 mile (1.6 km)
- Lift system: 5 chairlifts
- Terrain parks: 2
- Snowfall: 368 in (930 cm)
- Snowmaking: none
- Night skiing: Yes
- Website: MtAshland.com

Mount Ashland ski area is located on 7,532-foot (2,296 m) Mount Ashland and features 44 trails on 200 acres (0.81 km^{2}) served by five lifts, including expert terrain in a glacial cirque called The Bowl. The mountain averages 235" of snow annually, with a season from early December until mid-April. 7% of terrain is rated Beginner, 41% is Intermediate, 41% is Advanced, and 11% is Expert.

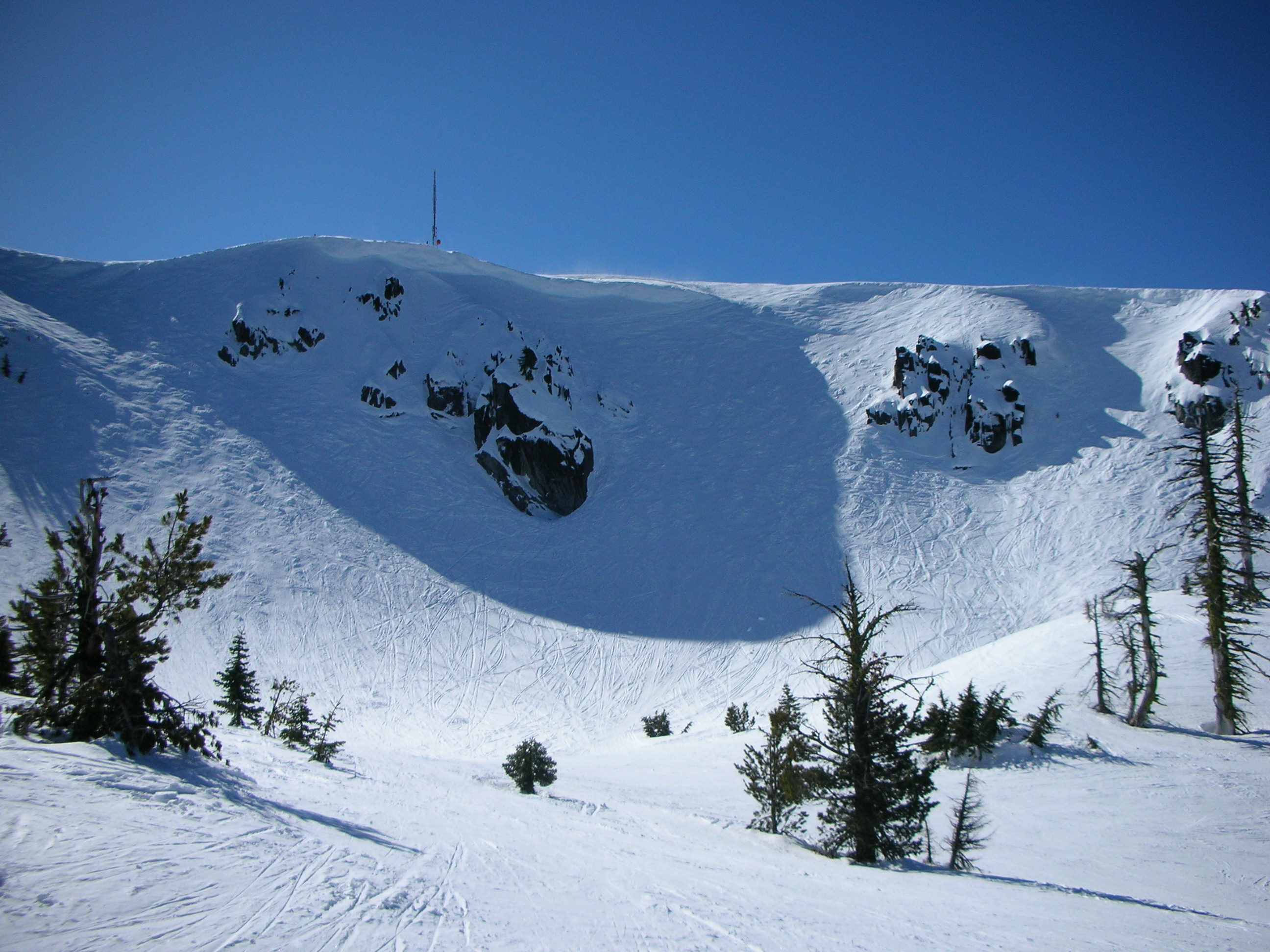
Mount Ashland's "Bowl"

== A Non-Profit Ski Area ==
Mt. Ashland is a community-focused ski area that is owned and operated by the non-profit Mt. Ashland Association. Mt. Ashland is dedicated to providing an outstanding alpine recreation experience for people of all ages and skill levels. To help meet its mission, Mt. Ashland offers the popular After School Youth Program which offers low-cost and free instruction to local youth.

== History ==
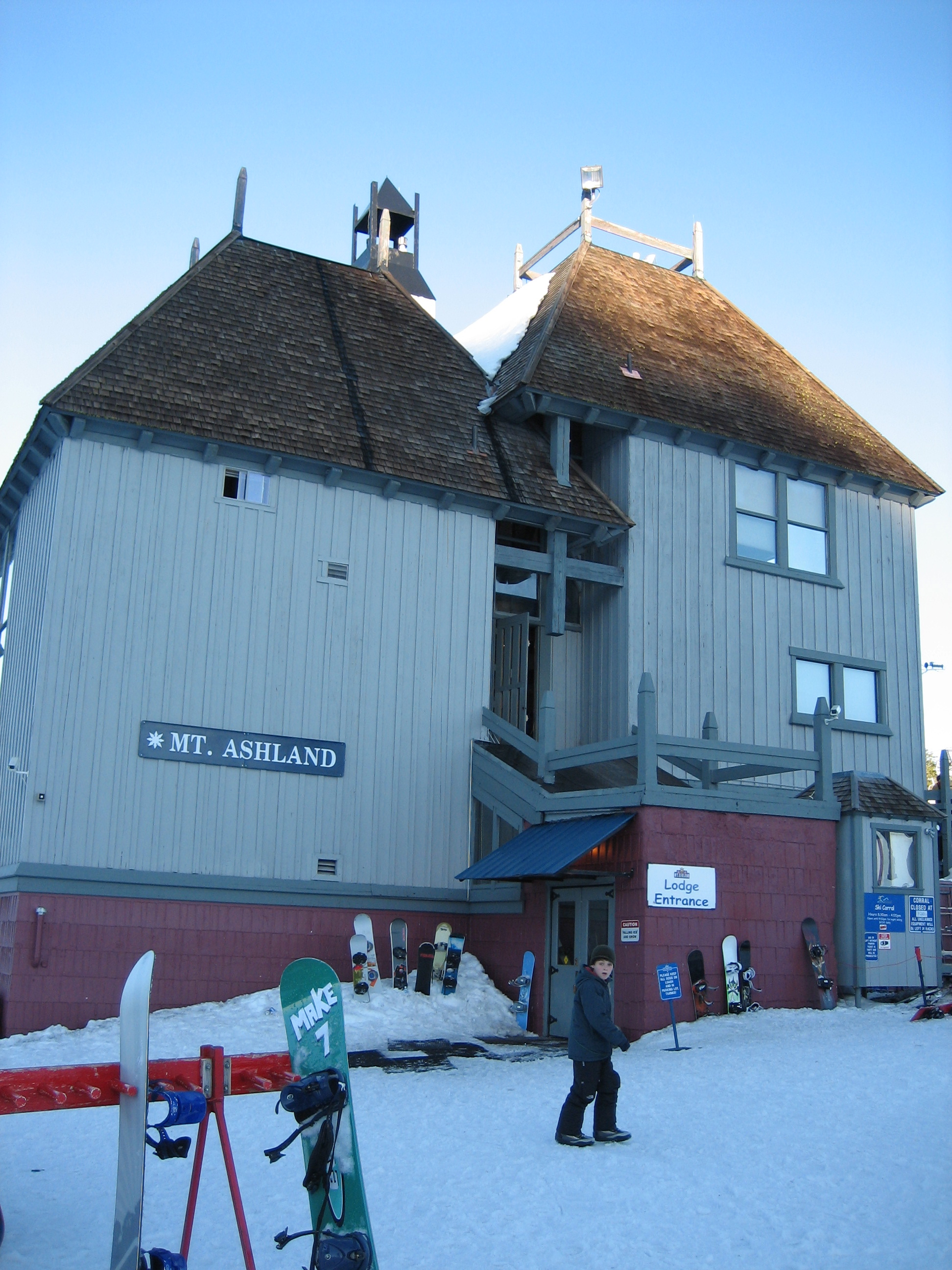
Mount Ashland's Lodge

During the 1950s, the mountain was a popular destination for local back country ski enthusiasts, some of whom built the lodge and one lift in 1963. Mt. Ashland opened to the public on January 11, 1964.

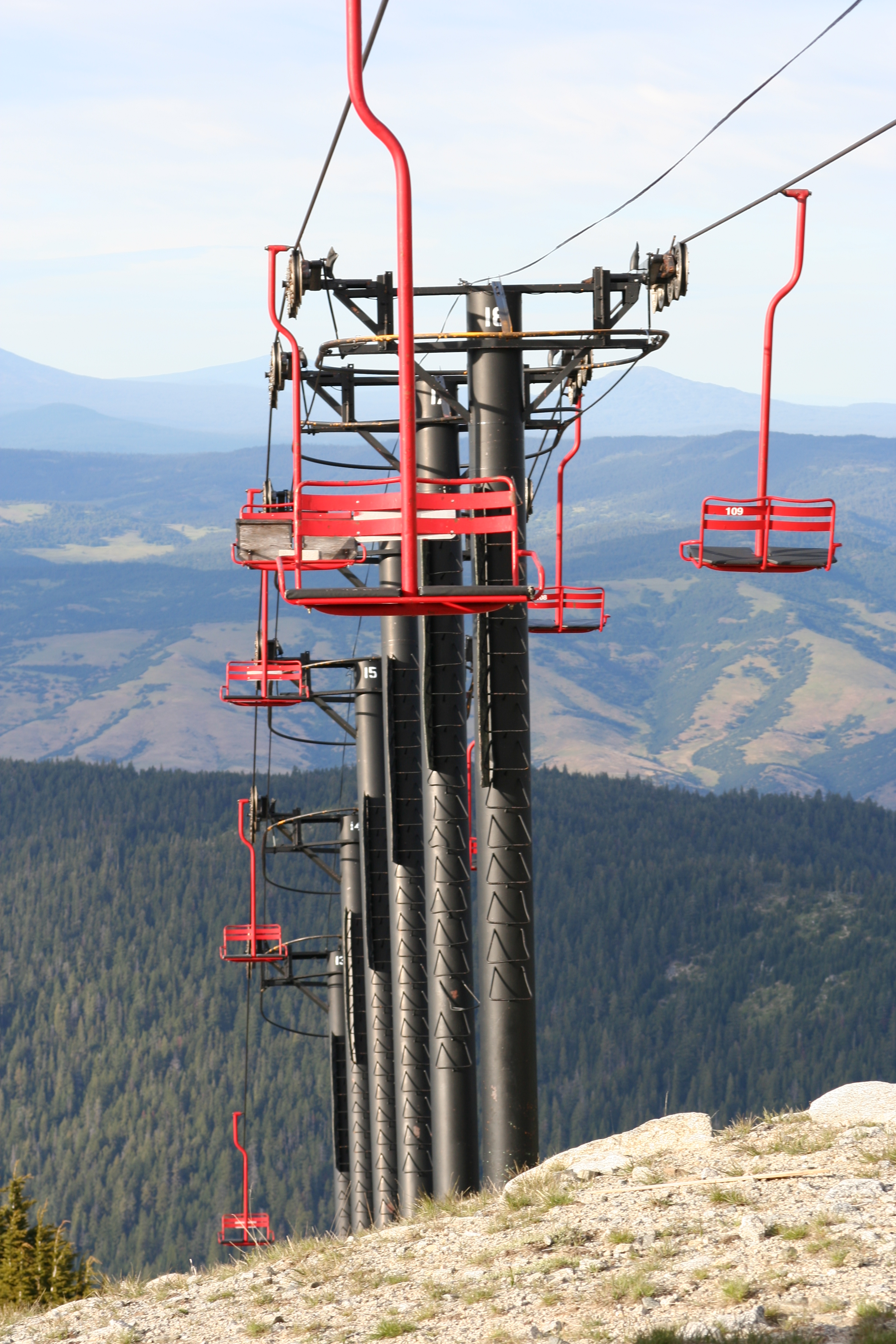
Mount Ashland chairlift in summer

During 1961 to 1963, the Mount Ashland Corporation raised money to clear trees, grade terrain, build roads, and develop a ski area. It includes a ski lodge, the Ariel chairlift, a T-bar lift, and a rope tow on the north face of the mountain. Medford businessman Glenn Jackson provided more than half of the $120,000 that financed construction of the lodge.

In 1970, the Mount Ashland Corporation ceased operations. The Southern Oregon College Foundation took over management of the ski area after the people of Jackson County financed the purchase of ski area's assets.

In 1977, Dick Hicks purchased the ski area from Jackson County and incorporated it as Ski Ashland, Inc. and installed the Windsor chairlift, which replaced the T-Bar. The Windsor chair is a Yan fixed-grip double chair.

In 1983, Harbor Properties of Seattle purchased Ski Ashland from Hicks. Over the next four years, Harbor Properties developed on-slope lighting, and vehicle shop.

In 1987, two new chairlifts were installed. The Comer chairlift was built to replace the little T-Bar and the Sonnet chairlift was built to replace the Poma lift. Both chairlifts are Riblet fixed-grip triple chairs.

In 1991, Harbor Properties announced its intention to move the chairlifts to its primary operation, Stevens Pass in Washington and close Mt. Ashland. A grassroots campaign called "Save Mt. Ashland" mobilized to purchase the ski area from Harbor Properties. Money for the purchase came from donor restricted contributions and a grant from the Oregon Economic Development Fund channeled through the City of Ashland. The city accepted donated funds and purchased Ski Ashland from Harbor Properties. The city then engaged Mount Ashland Association (MAA), a newly formed non-profit corporation, to maintain and operate the ski area.

In 1992, the City of Ashland entered a lease agreement with MAA. From 2005 through 2008, the City and Mt. Ashland had a series of legal disputes regarding the nonprofit's plans to expand capacity and renew infrastructure. The agreement between the City and Mt. Ashland Association was terminated in 2012, when the City gave the USFS Special Use Permit to association.

In 2007 and 2016, Mt. Ashland hosted the Oregon Interscholastic Racing Association high school state championships.

In 2017, Mt. Ashland became the first STOKE certified ski area in the world, a certification program for sustainably operated tourism sites.

In 2023, Mt. Ashland broke its record for highest winter visitation with 128,625 visitors.

In 2024, construction of the Lithia chairlift was completed, and was opened for the 2024-25 season. A generous donation from Karen and Sid DeBoer made this possible.

The Mt. Ashland Association continues to manage the ski area for the benefit for the entire community. Numerous programs benefiting the community include the deeply-discounted School Youth Program, the ACCESS Ski & Ride for Hunger day, Pride Ride, and Bavarian Night.

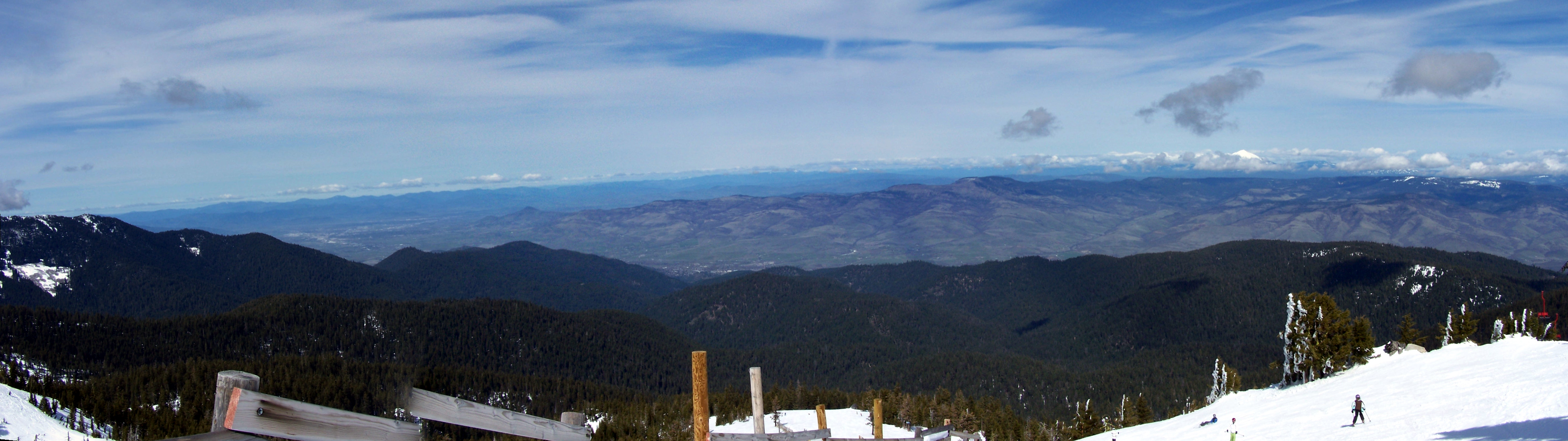
Looking north from near the summit

== Expansion ==
The ski area attempted to expand its terrain and add lifts in the 1990s. A Record of Decision provided Mt. Ashland the authority to move forward on this expansion plan, and is well documented in the Mount Ashland Ski Area Expansion article. In 2014 Mt. Ashland added several hundred spaces in its parking lot and began installing snow fencing on the mountain, as well as beginning several trail widening projects. From 2016-2022 Mt. Ashland completed several of the projects in the master plan including snow fencing, trail widening, and utility upgrades. In 2023, the ski area announced the construction of the Lithia Chairlift, part of the mountain's expansion plan. This chairlift was made possible by a $2.5 million gift from Sid & Karen DeBoer, the largest gift in the history of the Mt. Ashland Association. Future projects planned include a tubing facility, new lodge, and upgraded chairlifts.

== Other activities ==
Mount Ashland is a popular destination in summer for hiking, mountain biking, and sightseeing. The southernmost stretch of the Pacific Crest Trail in Oregon skirts the south and east sides of the mountain. The Mt. Ashland Hillclimb Run starts in Lithia Park near downtown Ashland and runners run up a series of Forest Service roads and trails to the summit of Mt. Ashland: 13+ miles long, 1 mile up. The Siskiyou Out Back is a set of three ultramarathon trail runs at distances of 15 kilometers (9.3 miles), 50 kilometers (31 miles), and 80.5 kilometers (50.0 miles) that start and end in the Mount Ashland ski area parking lot. Finally, the Mt. Ashland Trail Run, begins in the ski area parking lot, with runners ascending to the summit and returning to the parking lot via a series of roads leading down from the summit.

The Mt. Ashland lodge is open in the summers, offering food and beverage services as well as special events.

== Climate ==
Mount Ashland Ski Area has a dry-summer subalpine climate (Köppen climate classification Dsc). The record high temperature at the Mount Ashland Ski Area is 97 °F (36 °C), while the record low is −18 °F (−28 °C). Yearly rainfall averages over 60 inches (1,524 mm), while snowfall averages 223 inches (566 cm). The high elevation results in heavy precipitation, despite being located at the end of the Rogue Valley, which is located in a rain shadow.

Climate data for Mt. Ashland Ski Area Lodge (6,400 ft.)
Month	Jan	Feb	Mar	Apr	May	Jun	Jul	Aug	Sep	Oct	Nov	Dec	Year
Record high °F (°C)	61 (16)	63 (17)	68 (20)	79 (26)	86 (30)	97 (36)	94 (34)	95 (35)	91 (33)	82 (28)	65 (18)	58 (14)	97 (36)
Mean daily maximum °F (°C)	31 (−1)	37 (3)	41 (5)	47 (8)	58 (14)	65 (18)	75 (24)	74 (23)	67 (19)	55 (13)	39 (4)	31 (−1)	52 (11)
Mean daily minimum °F (°C)	11 (−12)	15 (−9)	18 (−8)	19 (−7)	26 (−3)	33 (1)	38 (3)	37 (3)	31 (−1)	23 (−5)	18 (−8)	13 (−11)	24 (−4)
Record low °F (°C)	−14 (−26)	−12 (−24)	−3 (−19)	2 (−17)	12 (−11)	14 (−10)	18 (−8)	17 (−8)	12 (−11)	0 (−18)	−6 (−21)	−18 (−28)	−18 (−28)
Average precipitation inches (mm)	9.52 (242)	7.66 (195)	7.02 (178)	4.80 (122)	2.67 (68)	1.19 (30)	0.78 (20)	0.95 (24)	1.34 (34)	5.14 (131)	10.73 (273)	11.88 (302)	63.68 (1,619)
Average snowfall inches (cm)	66 (170)	59 (150)	52 (130)	16 (41)	2.6 (6.6)	0.8 (2.0)	0.2 (0.51)	0.3 (0.76)	0.8 (2.0)	8 (20)	79 (200)	84 (210)	223 (570)
Source: Weather.com:
