= Siskiyou Wilderness =

Protected wilderness area in California, United States

- IUCN category Ib (wilderness area)
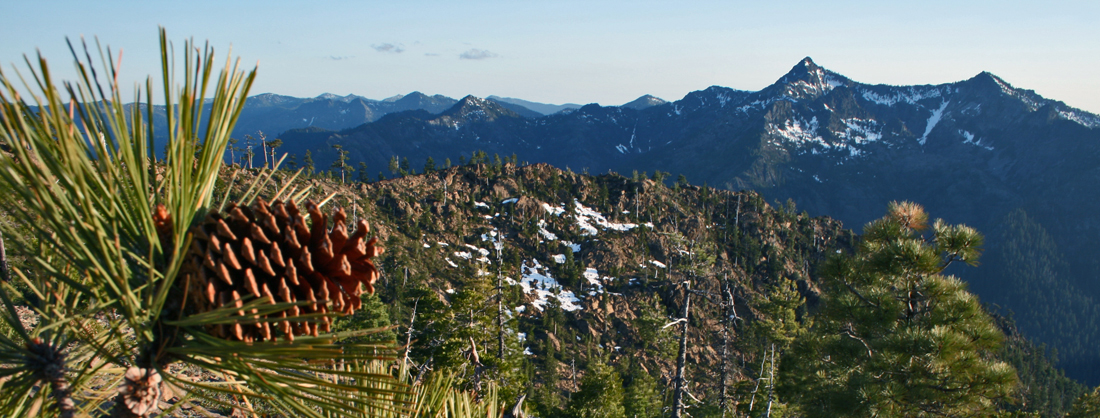

- Location within California Location within the United States
- Interactive map of Siskiyou Wilderness
- Location: Del Norte / Siskiyou / Humboldt counties, California, United States
- Nearest city: Crescent City, California
- Coordinates: 41°41′08″N 123°45′03″W
- Area: 182,802 acres (739.77 km^{2})
- Established: 1984; 42 years ago
- Governing body: U.S. Forest Service

The Siskiyou Wilderness is a 182,802 acres (739.77 km^{2}) federal wilderness area in the Six Rivers, Klamath, and Rogue River-Siskiyou National Forests in Northern California. It was designated by the passage of the California Wilderness Act of 1984 and was 153,000 acres (620 km^{2}) until 2006, when the Northern California Wild Heritage Act added 30,122 acres (121.90 km^{2}). The U.S. Forest Service manages the area.

== Topography ==
The highest points of the Siskiyou Mountains are protected by the wilderness. Elevations range from 770 feet (230 m) to 7,309 feet (2,228 m) at the summit of Preston Peak.

== Flora ==
The Siskiyou Wilderness contains vast old-growth forests and many endemic species of wildflowers, shrubs, and trees, including one of the world's largest concentrations of lily species, and up to 20 unique conifer species. These conifers range from rare species such as Alaska cedar and Port Orford cedar to the Klamath Mountains-endemic Brewer spruce.

== Fauna ==
The wilderness is home to several rare species, including wolverine, marten, fisher, northern spotted owl, and Roosevelt elk. There are also black bear, black-tailed deer, and varieties of birds. The clear streams provide spawning grounds for steelhead, coho and Chinook salmon.

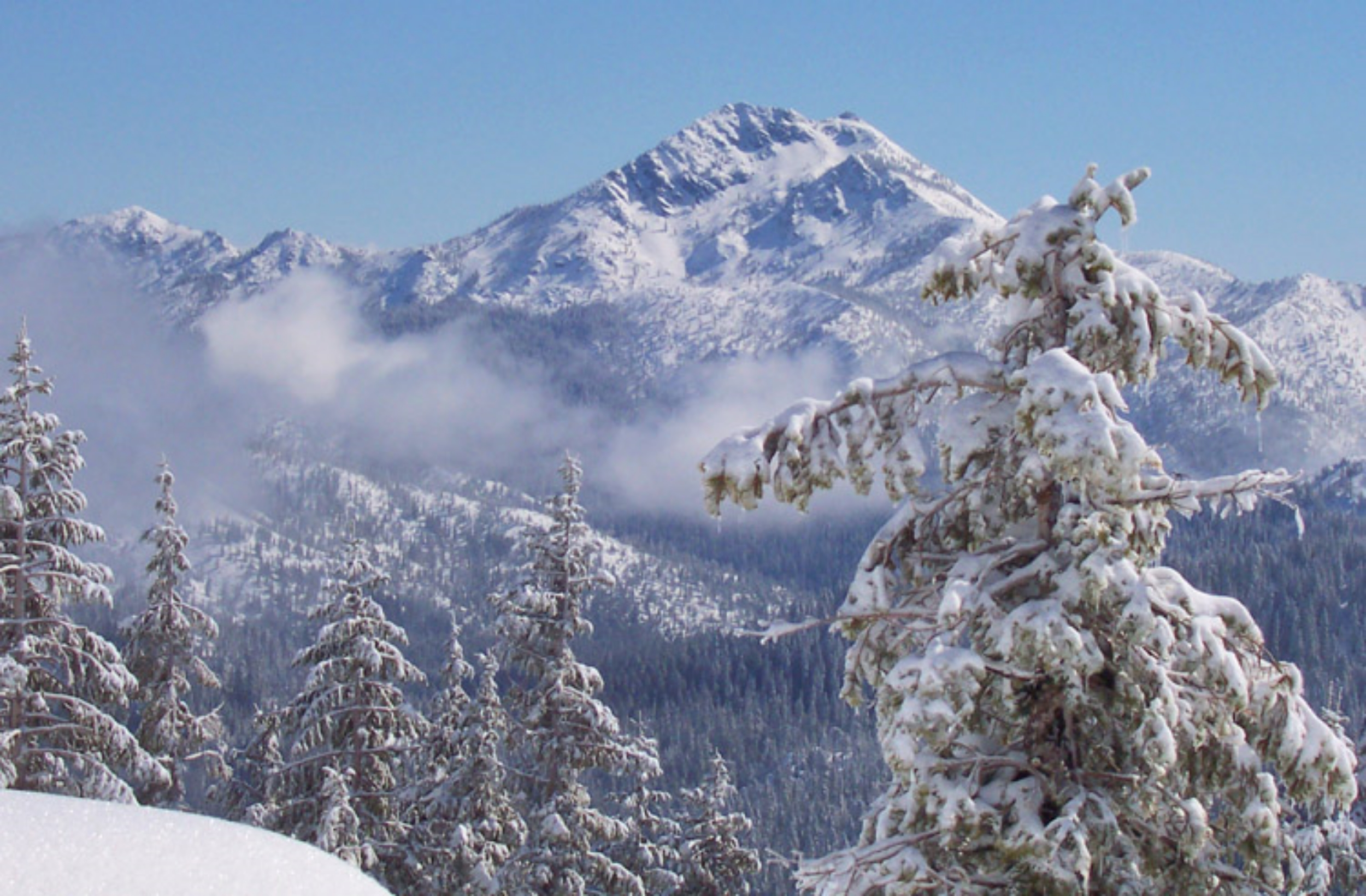
Snow-capped Preston Peak

== Hydrology and geology ==
The Wild-designated South Fork of the Smith River makes up a large part of the western boundary of the wilderness. One of the best exposures of ophiolite in the world can be seen around the river.

== Recreation ==
The wilderness has few trails, and use is mostly restricted to trails leading to lakes due to thick brush limiting cross-country travel. The Clear Creek National Recreation Trail crosses 20.5 miles (33.0 km) of the northern portion and provides access to some of the more scenic parts of the wilderness from near the Klamath River to the Smith River (California) divide. In the southern part of the wilderness, the Kelsey National Recreation Trail begins at Bear Lake, and the experienced hiker can walk for about 20 miles (32 km) to the Smith River. The Bigfoot Trail traverses the crest of the wilderness from north to south, through some of the most remote areas.

== Climate ==
Climate data for Siskiyou National Wilderness
Month	Jan	Feb	Mar	Apr	May	Jun	Jul	Aug	Sep	Oct	Nov	Dec	Year
Record high °F (°C)	69 (21)	80 (27)	92 (33)	96 (36)	108 (42)	111 (44)	115 (46)	115 (46)	110 (43)	100 (38)	82 (28)	69 (21)	115 (46)
Mean daily maximum °F (°C)	50 (10)	55 (13)	61 (16)	68 (20)	76 (24)	84 (29)	92 (33)	92 (33)	86 (30)	74 (23)	57 (14)	49 (9)	70 (21)
Mean daily minimum °F (°C)	31 (−1)	33 (1)	35 (2)	37 (3)	41 (5)	47 (8)	51 (11)	51 (11)	46 (8)	39 (4)	36 (2)	31 (−1)	40 (4)
Record low °F (°C)	7 (−14)	7 (−14)	19 (−7)	22 (−6)	22 (−6)	27 (−3)	29 (−2)	30 (−1)	24 (−4)	18 (−8)	10 (−12)	−2 (−19)	−2 (−19)
Average precipitation inches (mm)	9.16 (233)	8.56 (217)	6.90 (175)	3.04 (77)	1.55 (39)	0.66 (17)	0.31 (7.9)	0.54 (14)	1.24 (31)	3.11 (79)	7.86 (200)	8.79 (223)	51.72 (1,312.9)
Average snowfall inches (cm)	3.40 (8.6)	1.70 (4.3)	0.60 (1.5)	0.30 (0.76)	0 (0)	0 (0)	0 (0)	0 (0)	0 (0)	0 (0)	0.90 (2.3)	3.60 (9.1)	10.50 (26.7)

== See also ==
- Young Fire
