= Soy ink =

Printer's ink made from soybeans

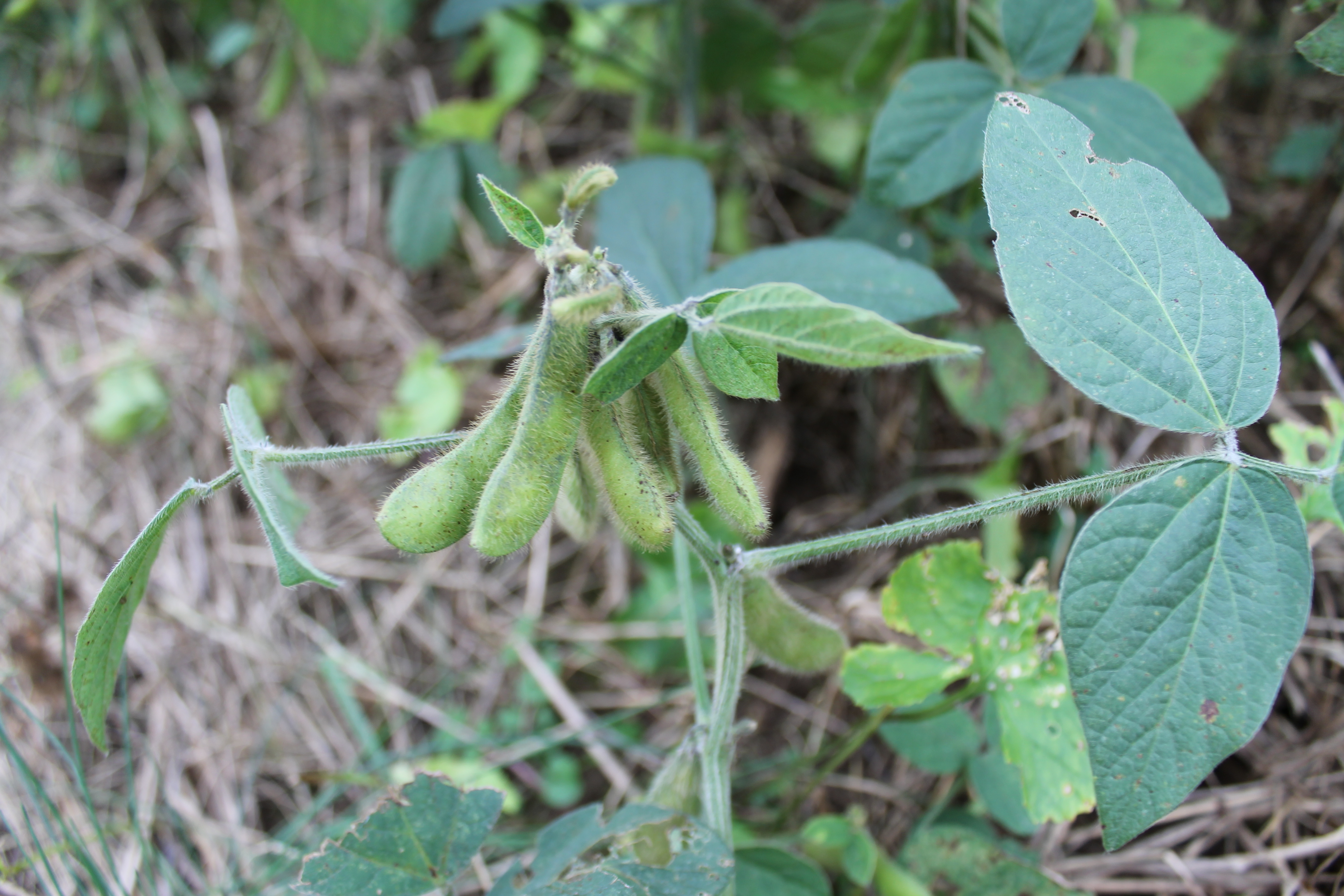
Soy bean pods

Soy ink is a plant-based ink made from soybeans (Glycine max). Developed as an alternative to petroleum-based inks, it offers reduced volatile organic compound (VOC) emissions, lower environmental toxicity, and facilitates easier de-inking during paper recycling. Because highly refined soybean oil is naturally clearer than petroleum distillates, soy ink can produce bright, precise colors with less pigment. However, it dries more slowly than traditional solvent-based inks, which can limit its efficiency on certain printing setups, such as high-speed commercial presses using coated papers.

== History ==
In the late 1970s, the Newspaper Association of America (NAA) sought alternative formulations for printing ink to mitigate dependency on standard petroleum-based products. Rising petroleum prices and geopolitical friction with OPEC member nations prompted the industry to search for more stable, cost-efficient, and domestically available raw materials.

After testing over 2,000 vegetable oil variations, researchers developed a viable formulation utilizing soybean oil. In 1987, soy ink was successfully trialed in a practical printing run by The Gazette in Iowa. Adoption grew rapidly within the newsprint sector; approximately one-third of newspaper printers in the United States utilize soy-based inks, and more than 90% of domestic daily newspapers are printed with color soy ink. Similar agricultural alternatives include bran ink, which utilizes rice bran oil as its primary solvent.

The SoySeal mark, authorized by the American Soybean Association.

The National Soy Ink Information Center was established in 1993 by the Iowa Soybean Association to coordinate research and promote commercial adoption. The center introduced the "SoySeal" certification mark to identify products meeting minimum soy-oil content thresholds. By 2005, widespread market integration led to the closing of the information center, with ongoing regulation of the SoySeal trademark transferred directly to the American Soybean Association.

== Production and properties ==
To manufacture soy ink, soybean oil undergoes a light refining process before being blended with pigments, resins, and waxes. Despite utilizing an edible oil base, the final chemical compound is neither edible nor completely biodegradable, as the added pigments and chemical hardeners remain identical to those used in petroleum-based formulations. Degradability studies by Erhan and Bagby demonstrated that the pigment carrier in pure soy formulations degrades approximately twice as completely as ink containing petroleum resins, and four times as completely as standard conventional mineral inks. During the paper recycling process, soy-based binders are more easily stripped from cellulose fibers during industrial de-inking stages, reducing fiber damage and improving recycled pulp quality.

Soybean crops grown for industrial use generally require less intensive artificial irrigation and leave lower volumes of agricultural residues compared to conventional cash crops. Soy-based inks emit lower concentrations of volatile organic compounds (VOCs) during the drying phase, lowering occupational exposure levels and localized emissions.

The structural clarity of refined soybean oil permits the development of high-vibrancy colored inks without requiring clear petroleum distillates. Because the carrier oil is transparent, less chemical pigment is needed to achieve the target optical density, lowering production costs for colored variants. Industrial trials indicate that soy ink spreads further per unit volume than mineral alternatives, yielding an approximate 15% increase in coverage capacity during sheet-fed offset printing workflows. Color formulations are highly competitive with petroleum alternatives, whereas pure black newsprint ink remains slightly more expensive due to the lower relative cost of bulk mineral base stocks.

== Disadvantages ==
A primary operational constraint of soy ink is its prolonged drying duration relative to traditional volatile solvent inks. Because it lacks rapidly evaporating VOC solvents, drying relies primarily on substrate absorption or chemical cross-linking. This delays processing speeds on high-volume commercial presses utilizing coated or non-porous papers (such as magazines), where absorption is limited.

To address drying speeds, industrial research has increasingly shifted toward UV-curable and electron-beam-curable vegetable inks. These formulations utilize photoinitiators that polymerize instantly under UV light lamps, eliminating the drying delay while maintaining low VOC profiles, though they require specific equipment modifications.

Global soybean production is also scrutinized due to its historical intersection with deforestation in Brazil and the conversion of native ecosystems like the Cerrado savanna into agricultural land, which contributes to substantial greenhouse gas emissions. Supply-chain initiatives, including the Amazon Soy Moratorium, have targeted these impacts with varying levels of regional compliance.
