= Mount Ashland =

Mountain in Oregon, U.S.

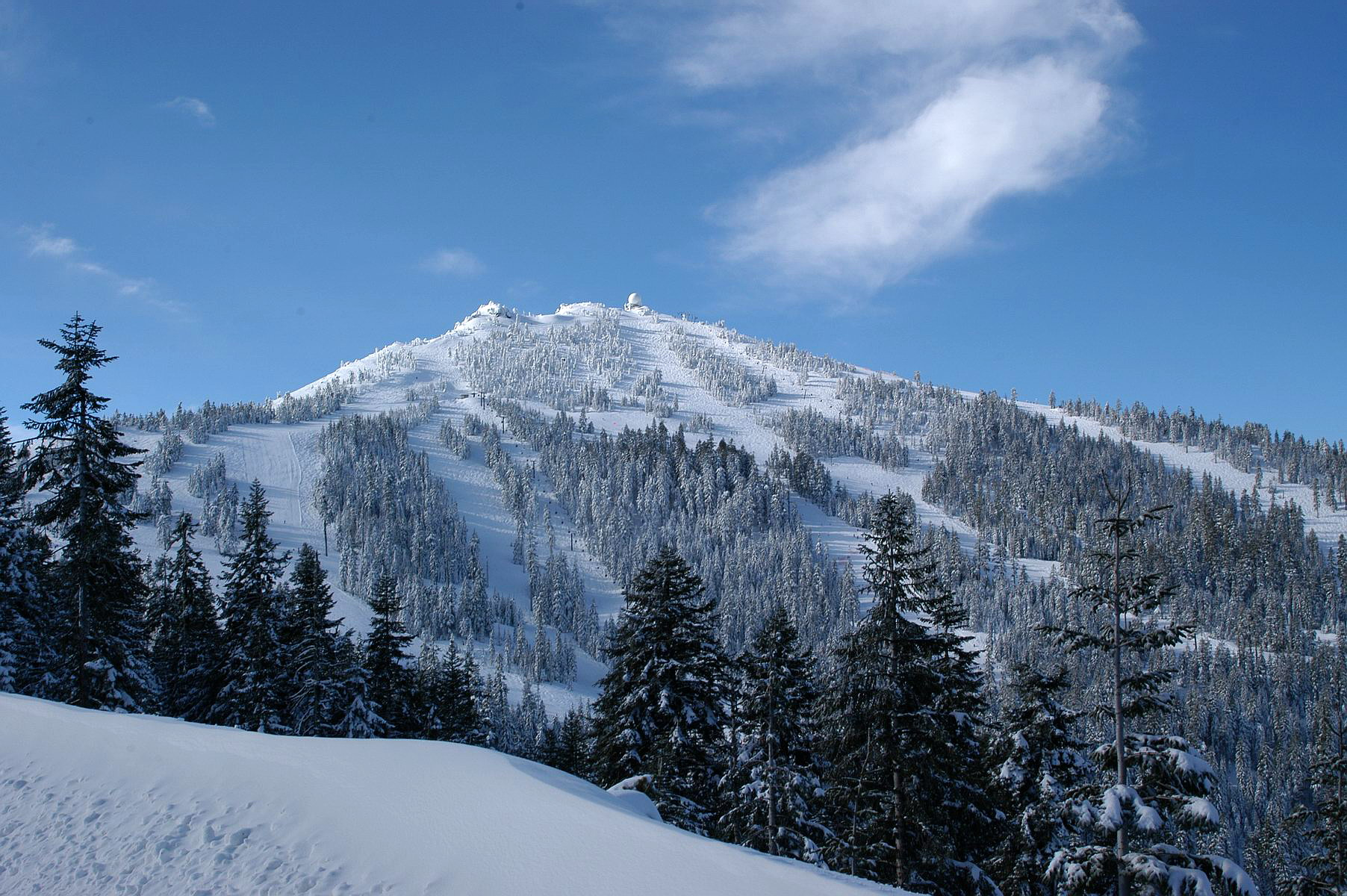
- Mount Ashland ski area in winter

Highest point
- Elevation: 7,532 ft (2,296 m) NAVD 88
- Prominence: 3,132 ft (955 m)
- Coordinates: 42°04′51″N 122°43′01″W

Geography
- Location within Oregon
- Location: Jackson County, Oregon, U.S.
- Parent range: Klamath Mountains
- Topo map: USGS Mount Ashland

Mount Ashland is the highest peak in the Siskiyou Mountains of southern Oregon. It was named for the city of Ashland, located 8.6 miles (14 km) north of the mountain. The Siskiyou Mountains are a subrange of the Klamath Mountains in northwestern California and southwestern Oregon. The mountain is part of the Rogue River–Siskiyou National Forest, which encompasses most of the Siskiyou Mountains. The Oregon–California border is 5 miles (8 km) south of the mountain.

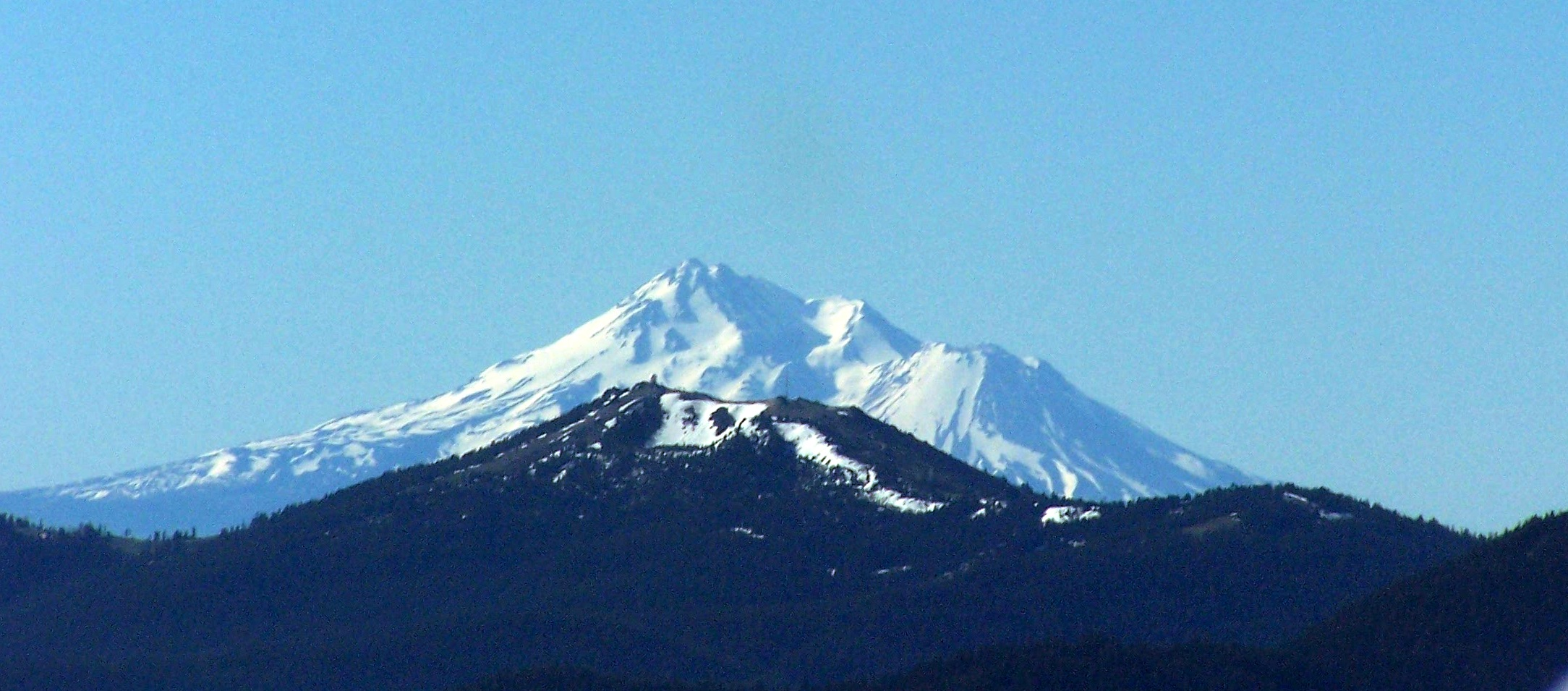
An aerial image of Mount Ashland with Mount Shasta behind it

== Geology ==
Mount Ashland is composed largely of granite, with other igneous intrusive rocks like diorite and granodiorite. The peak and its surrounding flanks make up the Mount Ashland pluton.

== Recreation ==
Mount Ashland Ski Area, located on the mountain, features 23 trails on 200 acres (81 ha) served by four lifts.
