= Oregon Wild =

American conservation organization

- Founded: 1974
- Type: 501 (c)(3)
- Tax ID no.: 23-7432820
- Purpose: Environmental activism
- Location: 5825 North Greeley, Portland, OR 97217-4145
- Coordinates: 45.566°N 122.696°W
- Region served: Oregon
- Members: 3,000
- Employees: 13
- Website: www.oregonwild.org
- Formerly called: Oregon Natural Resources Council

Oregon Wild, formerly the Oregon Natural Resources Council, is an American environmental activist organization based in Portland, Oregon, with offices in Eugene and Bend. The group is notable for having had a case, Marsh v. Oregon Natural Resources Council 490 U.S. 360 (1989), tried before the U.S. Supreme Court.

== Organization ==
Founded in 1974 as the Oregon Wilderness Coalition, and later renamed Oregon Natural Resources Council (ONRC), Oregon Wild claims credit for helping to bring about legislative protection for nearly 1,700,000 acres (690,000 ha) of preserved wilderness, 95,000 acres (38,000 ha) of forests in the Bull Run watershed and more than 58,000,000 acres (23,000,000 ha) of roadless areas, as well as the addition of almost 1,800 miles (2,900 km) of rivers and streams to the National Wild and Scenic Rivers System. To this end, they claim the ability to muster 3,000 members and over 11,000 "e-mail activists." Additionally, Oregon Wild is listed as a plaintiff in cases against the U.S. Bureau of Land Management, the U.S. Forest Service, the U.S. Fish and Wildlife Service, the U.S. Department of the Interior and the State of Oregon.

=== Name change ===
In 2006, the ONRC changed its name to Oregon Wild, citing concerns that the organization was frequently mistaken for either a government agency or a state chapter of the Natural Resources Defense Council. The new name was hoped to be shorter, less confusing, and easier to remember.

== Areas of focus ==
Oregon Wild's focus is to protect and restore Oregon’s wildlands, wildlife and waters as an enduring legacy for all Oregonians.

=== Wilderness ===
Oregon Wild is seeking wilderness protection for all of Oregon's roadless forested lands of 1,000 acres (400 ha) or more, as well as a restoration of ecosystems bordering current protected areas. With about 4 percent of Oregon designated as wilderness, Oregon Wild proposes adding 5,000,000 acres (2,000,000 ha) of forested public lands to the wilderness system, to add to past campaign successes.

=== Rivers and Clean Water ===
Oregon Wild seeks to protect Oregon's rivers, lakes and wetlands from dams, development, mining and logging. Oregon Wild has ongoing campaigns to protect Portland drinking water quality and the Klamath Basin.

== See also ==
- Mount Ashland Ski Area
