= Ben Johnson Mountain =

Mountain in Oregon, United States

- Negro Ben Mountain
- Location within Oregon

Highest point
- Elevation: 4,398 ft (1,341 m) NAVD 88
- Prominence: 655 ft (200 m)
- Coordinates: 42°12′16″N 123°05′36″W

Geography
- Location: Jackson County, Oregon, U.S.
- Parent range: Siskiyou Mountains
- Topo map: USGS Ruch

Ben Johnson Mountain (formerly Negro Ben Mountain) is a summit in Jackson County, Oregon, in the United States, with an elevation of 4,398 feet (1,341 m).

The mountain was named for Ben Johnson, a local African-American blacksmith. The summit historically was known as Nigger Ben Mountain until the name Negro Ben was officially adopted in 1964.

As of October 24, 2020 the name has officially been changed by the Oregon Geographic Names Board to his full name Ben Johnson.
