= South Fork Salmon River (California) =

Coordinates: 41°15′24″N 123°19′24″W

Location
- Country: United States

National Wild and Scenic River
- Designated: January 19, 1981

The South Fork Salmon River is a 39.5-mile (63.6 km) river in Siskiyou County, California and is the larger of two tributaries that join to form the Salmon River, the other being the North Fork. It begins in the Salmon Mountains, on the border of Siskiyou and Trinity County, about 15 miles (24 km) southeast of Cecilville, and flows generally northwest through the Salmon Mountains to its confluence with the North Fork at Forks of Salmon. The South Fork drains an area of 290 square miles (750 km^{2}), located entirely in the Klamath National Forest, with a significant portion in the Trinity Alps Wilderness.

Its largest tributary, the East Fork South Fork Salmon River, originates northeast of Cecilville, near the junction of the Scott Mountains and the Salmon Mountains, and flows 15.2 miles (24.5 km) southwest to join the South Fork upstream of Cecilville.

== See also ==
- List of rivers of California
