= Bald Hills, California =

City in Klamath County, United States

Bald Hills is a former settlement in Klamath County, now located in Humboldt County, California, United States. It was located 10 miles (16 km) southeast of Orick. In 1862 it was described as being between Trinidad and Orleans Bar, and within an easy day's travel from Fort Gaston.

A post office operated at Bald Hills from November 25, 1867, to January 23, 1878. It may have been a post office earlier, according to a news item from Alta California, November 29, 1862. It said that the post office at Bald Hills was burned at the same time as the one at Albeeville.

The name of the place comes from the nearby Bald Hills.
