= Apyu, California =

Human settlement in the United States

Apyu is a former Karok settlement in Humboldt County, California, United States. It was located approximately 1 mile (1.6 km) above the Salmon River mouth near the upper rapids above the mouth of the Salmon across from Ishipishi. Its precise location is unknown. It was approximately 0.5 miles (0.80 km) east of Somes Bar, a community in Siskiyou County.
