= Sawuara, California =

Sawuara (also, Sa-Ron-ra, Sa-vour-ras, Sa-vow-ra, Sa-wa-rahs, and Shah-woo-rum) is a former Karok settlement in Del Norte County, California, located on the east bank of the Klamath River, not far below Orleans (then Orleans Bar). Its precise location is unknown.
