= Chumawi, California =

Chumawi or Chu-ma-wa is a former Shastan settlement in present-day Modoc County, northeastern California, United States.

It was located in Big Valley of the Pit River; its precise location is unknown.
