= Shasta traditional narratives =

Shasta traditional narratives include myths, legends, tales, and oral histories preserved by the Shasta people (including the Konomihu and Okwanuchu) of northern California and southern Oregon.

== Introduction ==
Shastan oral literature reflects the position of the group in an area where cultural influences converged from several different regions, including central California, Pacific Northwest, Plateau, and Great Basin. (See also Traditional narratives (Native California).)

=== Online examples of Shasta narratives ===
- "Indian Myths of South Central California" by Alfred L. Kroeber (1907)
- Myths and Legends of California and the Old Southwest by Katharine Berry Judson (1912)
- The North American Indian by Edward S. Curtis (1924)

== See also ==
- Shastan languages
