= Klamath County =

Klamath County may refer to:

- Klamath County, California, a former county of the U.S. state of California
- Klamath County, Oregon, a current county of the U.S. state of Oregon
