= Aranimokw, California =

Human settlement in the United States

Aranimokw is a former Karok settlement in Humboldt County, California, United States. It was located near Red Cap Creek, a tributary which enters the Klamath River south of Orleans; the precise location of the village is unknown.
