= New River Shasta language =

Extinct Shastan language of California, US

New River Shasta
- Native to: United States
- Region: Salmon River, northern California
- Ethnicity: Shasta
- Extinct: after 1926
- Language family: Hokan ?: Shasta–Palaihnihan; Shastan; New River Shasta

Language codes
- ISO 639-3: None (mis)
- Glottolog: newr1237
- New River Shasta

- New River Shasta is classified as Extinct by the UNESCO Atlas of the World's Languages in Danger.

New River Shasta is an extinct Shastan language formerly spoken by the New River Shasta people in northern California. It may have had only 300 speakers before contact, and they soon went extinct; the language is attested in only a few short wordlists. Kroeber regarded them as possibly "nearest to the major group in speech, although [...] their tongue as a whole must have been unintelligible to the Shasta proper." The last recorded speaker of New River Shasta was Saxy Kidd, who only remembered some words and had mostly forgotten his language.

== Sources ==
- Mithun, Marianne (1999), The Languages of Native North America, Cambridge: Cambridge University Press
