= Okwanuchu =

Shastan-speaking tribe of Northern California

The Okwanuchu were one of a number of small Shastan-speaking tribes of Native Americans in Northern California, who were closely related to the adjacent larger Shasta tribe.

== Geography ==
The Okwanuchu occupied territory south, southwest, and southeast of Mount Shasta in California, including the present-day cities of Mount Shasta, California, McCloud, California and Dunsmuir, California; on the upper Sacramento River downstream to North Salt Creek; in the Yet Atwam Creek drainage; and on the upper McCloud River downstream to where it meets Yet Atwam Creek.

Anthropologist Alfred L. Kroeber suggested in 1918 that the Okwanuchu had become extinct. Very little is known about the location of their villages and settlements, or about their culture, other than a presumed similarity to their Shasta and Achomawi neighbors. The archaeological sites associated with their range date back in excess of 5,000 years.

== Language ==
The Okwanuchu were speakers of the Okwanuchu language, an older Hokan-speaking family of languages. Although their language was closely related to that of the Shasta language of the main Shasta tribe, it contained some elements of Wintu and Achomawi.

Members of the Penutian-speaking family of languages, especially the Wintu, arrived in central Northern California in the vicinity of Redding, California about 1200 years ago, likely from southern Oregon. The Wintu possessed superior technology, were out-competing their Hokan-language family neighbors, and were expanding Wintu territory at the expense of the Okwanuchu and the Achomawi to the north, and the Yana to the east. It appears likely that even if Europeans and Americans not intervened (beginning in the 1820s), the Wintu would have absorbed or otherwise eliminated the Okwanuchu over the course of the coming centuries.

== See also ==
- Shastan languages
