= Elk Camp, California =

Coordinates: 41°13′25″N 123°57′34″W

Elk Camp was an American settlement between Redwood Creek and the Klamath River, fifteen miles northwest of Fort Anderson in modern Humboldt County, California it was formerly located in Klamath County. Elk Camp was a post office from January 31, 1859, to December 19, 1862.

In May 1862, under threat of Indian raids on its cattle, the local settlers urgently requested military protection. Post at Elk Camp, a temporary post, garrisoned from Fort Ter-Waw, was probably established within the settlement. A trail was to be cut through the forest from Fort Ter-Waw to Elk Camp, to link up with the forts south of the Klamath River.
