= Shanamkarak, California =

Former Karok settlement in Humboldt County, California, U.S.

Coordinates: 41.3658°N 123.4921°W

Shanamkarak (also, Asha-nahm-ka, Eh-qua-nek, He-co-necks, Ikwanek, and Ke-ko-nek) is a former Karok settlement in Humboldt County, California. It was located on the Klamath River, 1 mile (1.6 km) to 2 miles (3.2 km) below the confluence with the Salmon River; its precise location is unknown.
