= Shegoashkwu, California =

Shegoashkwu is a former Karok settlement in Del Norte County, California, United States, below Orleans (then Orleans Bar), on the Klamath River. Its precise location is unknown.
