= North Fork Salmon River (California) =

Coordinates: 41°15′24″N 123°19′24″W

Location
- Country: United States

National Wild and Scenic River
- Designated: January 19, 1981

The North Fork Salmon River is a 36.9-mile (59.4 km) river in Siskiyou County, California. It joins with the South Fork Salmon River at Forks of Salmon to form the Salmon River, a major tributary of the Klamath River. Originating at English Lakes near 7,322-foot (2,232 m) English Peak in the Salmon Mountains, the North Fork drains about 204 square miles (530 km^{2}) of rugged, forested terrain. The entire river is located within the Klamath National Forest, with the headwaters located in the Marble Mountain Wilderness. Native American tribes, including the Nez Perce, have inhabited the North Fork of the Salmon River and its watershed for thousands of years, relying on the river's salmon for sustenance and as a source of cultural identity.

== See also ==
- List of rivers of California
