= Kidnapping of Elizabeth Thomas =

2017 kidnapping in the United States

- Location: Kidnapping: Maury County, Tennessee; Confinement and Rescue: Siskiyou County, California
- Date: March 13, 2017 – April 20, 2017
- Victim: Elizabeth Thomas
- Perpetrator: Tad Cummins
- Motive: Sexual gratification
- Verdict: Pleaded guilty
- Convictions: Transportation of minor across state lines with intent to engage in criminal sexual activity, Obstruction of justice

On March 13, 2017, 15-year-old Elizabeth Thomas went missing with her 50-year-old health and science teacher Tad Cummins for 38 days. Cummins took Thomas across state lines to a remote cabin in Cecilville, California, where a gas station worker recognized them and turned him in. Cummins was sentenced to 20 years in federal prison. A docudrama about the kidnapping was premiered on Lifetime in 2023, titled Abducted by My Teacher: The Elizabeth Thomas Story.

== Background ==
Elizabeth Thomas was born to exterminator Anthony Edward Thomas and Kimberly Thomas and lived in Culleoka, Tennessee. In 2016, Thomas was homeschooled until her mother was removed from their home and charged with child abuse and child neglect, after which she began going to public school at Culleoka Unit School.

Tad Cummins was a father and grandfather when he encountered Elizabeth Thomas. He was married to his wife Jill Cummins for 31 years at the time he abducted her. He started teaching at Culleoka Unit School in 2011 and was known for being an informal teacher. In fall 2015, Thomas first encountered Cummins as a 14-year-old freshman in his class; Thomas had her sit next to him during class, eat lunch in his class room, visit him during her open class periods, and receive "counseling sessions" with him during other teacher's classes.

In fall 2016, Cummins told Thomas he wanted to see her naked, and he began kissing and sexually abusing her during school hours. When Thomas confided in him about her mental health struggles and her want to seek professional help, he told her not to. At school, other teachers and students were well aware of the relationship, with one student asking to be removed from Cummins' class due to discomfort with their relationship and another witnessing Cummins kiss Thomas on January 23, 2017. The school investigated the incident but did not inform Thomas' parents, and kept Thomas in Cummins' class. On January 27, Cummins chaperoned Thomas' field trip and solicited Thomas for sex, which she refused. On January 30, Thomas was removed from his classroom and told to seek guidance from other counselors than Cummins, although other teachers refused to. On February 3, at Thomas' father's urgent request, the school principal formally reprimanded Cummins for non-professional conduct and insubordination, and then, once Thomas' father hired a lawyer to force the school to take further action, the school suspended Cummins from his teaching position. Cummins continued to communicate with Thomas by text and over the phone.

== Abduction ==
On March 5, 2017, 8 days prior to abducting Thomas, Tad Cummins searched "teen marriage" and the age of consent online. On March 10, he searched if his car could be tracked by law enforcement. In the week prior to kidnapping Thomas, Cummins took out a $4500 title loan in cash and filed a prescription for Cialis, an erectile dysfunction drug. On March 13, he told his wife he needed to borrow her car for a job interview and took with him the cash, Cialis, 2 guns, clothing, and toiletries. He also left a note for his wife that he was leaving to clear his mind in Virginia or Washington D.C., which law enforcement later stated was a diversion intended for investigators.

Thomas agreed to leave with him and was dropped off at a restaurant in Columbia in the early morning of March 13. As soon as they were ready to leave, Cummins showed Thomas a gun in the middle console of the vehicle. Cummins discarded their phones in the Tennessee River and went to Alabama, where Cummins detached the vehicle's GPS and replaced its license plate, and then traveled across the country with her. Cummins kept Thomas with him at all times or would lock her in the car with the car alarm on. Security footage found the pair in Oklahoma City at a Walmart, where both had altered their hair color.

By March 17, Cummins was placed on Tennessee's top 10 most wanted list for aggravated kidnapping and sexual contact with a minor.

In San Diego, Cummins bought a $1500 kayak so they could boat to Mexico and avoid police, but he worried it was too dangerous and sold the boat instead. They then drove to Siskiyou County, where they first stayed at Black Bear Ranch, but the commune asked them to leave because Cummins carried around a knife and defied the commune's work rules. They left and spoke to 29-year-old Cecilville gas station worker Griffin Barry, who offered them temporary housing at a remote cabin in the Siskiyou Mountains; after recognizing them as the missing teacher and student, the worker then called in a tip to the authorities.

Local law enforcement identified Cummins' wife's 2015 Nissan Rogue by its vehicle identification number and subsequently arrested Cummins.

== Aftermath ==
=== Criminal proceedings ===
In April 2018, Cummins pled guilty to federal charges of transporting a minor across state lines with intent to engage in criminal sexual activities, as well as obstruction of justice. In 2019, he was sentenced to 20 years in prison. At a sentencing hearing, Thomas requested the court sentence Cummins for 38 years, a year for each day of her 38-day captivity.

=== Civil proceedings ===
In behalf of his minor daughter, Elizabeth's father Anthony Thomas filed suit against Maury County Board of Education in January 19, 2018, asserting a duty for the school to have written policies prohibiting sexual harassment of students, failure to supervise its employees on how to identify and respond to student sexual harassment, and failure to identify and respond to the abuse despite awareness of Tad Cummins' actions, therefore causing physical injury, emotional distress, psychological trauma and denial of education. In January 2020, the school board settled with the Thomases for $650,000.

=== Docudrama ===
The kidnapping was later adapted into a true crime docudrama, Abducted by My Teacher: The Elizabeth Thomas Story, which premiered on August 12, 2023 on Lifetime. The docudrama was directed by Shawn Linden and written by Kristine Huntley.
