= Kworatem, California =

Kworatem
- Former settlement
- Location in California
- Coordinates: 41°22′35″N 123°29′29″W
- Country: United States
- State: California
- County: Humboldt
- Elevation: 515 ft (157 m)

Kworatem (also, Cor-a-tem and Quoratem) is a former Karok settlement in Humboldt County, California, United States. It was located at the confluence of the Klamath and Salmon Rivers, at an elevation of 515 feet (157 m).

The name Quoratem was erroneously used by Gibbs for the Karok Indians, and was adopted by Powell in the adjectival form Quoratean as the name of the linguistic family constituted by the Karok.
