= Wooley Creek =

Stream in California, United States

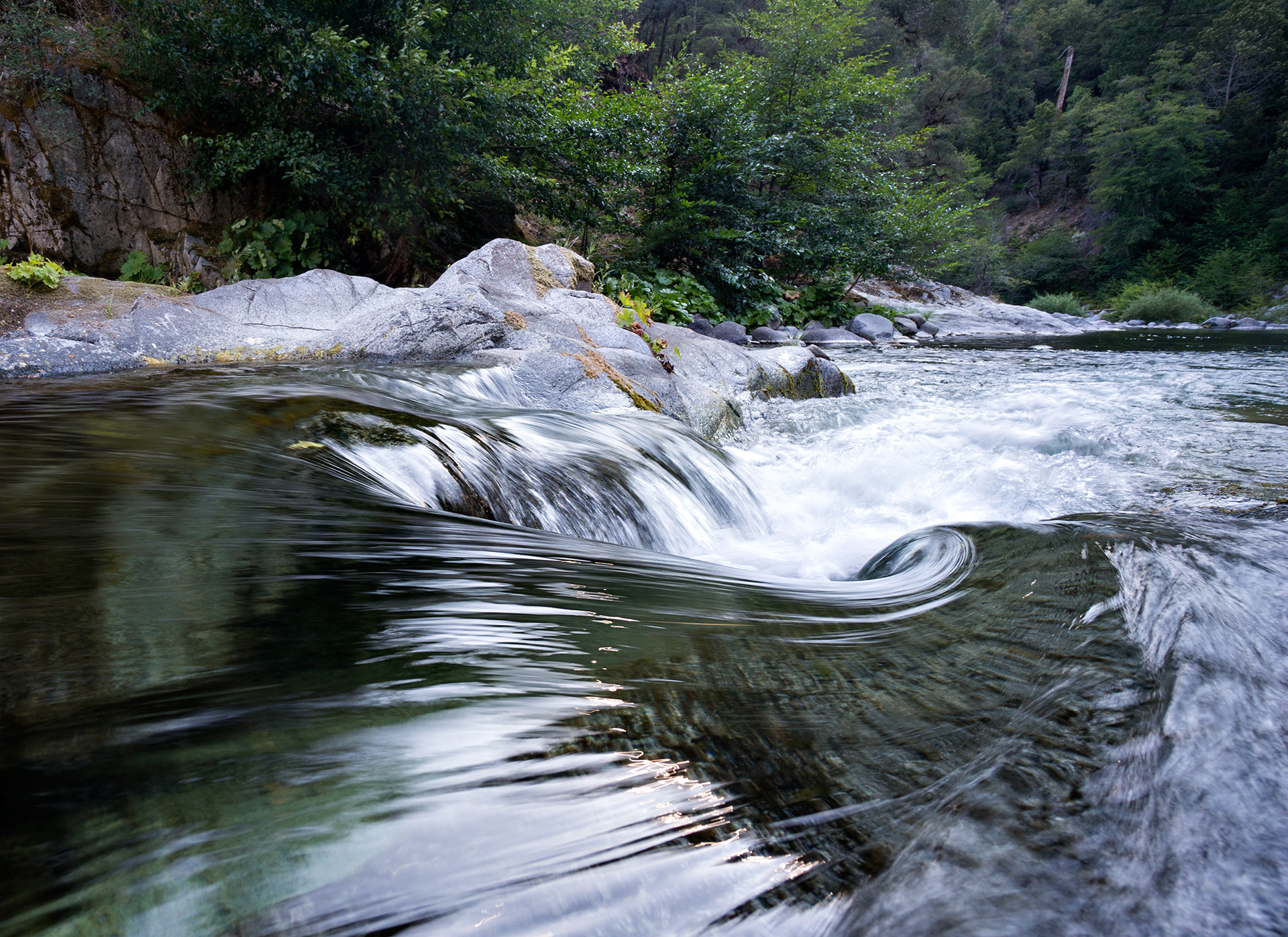
- Wooley Creek near Marble Mountains

- Location of Wooley Creek in California

Location
- Country: United States
- State: California

Physical characteristics
- Source: Marble Mountains
  - location: Klamath National Forest
  - coordinates: 41°30′38″N 123°07′55″W
  - elevation: 5,609 ft (1,710 m)
- Mouth: Salmon River
  - location: Near Somes Bar
  - coordinates: 41°22′37″N 123°25′21″W
  - elevation: 614 ft (187 m)
- Length: 22 mi (35 km)

National Wild and Scenic Rivers System
- Designated: January 19, 1981

Wooley Creek is a large stream in Siskiyou County, California, a tributary of the Salmon River. Wooley Creek flows 22 miles (35 km) from Man Eaten Lake in the Marble Mountain Wilderness of the Klamath National Forest, in a generally southwest direction, to its confluence with the Salmon River about 4 miles (6.4 km) upstream of the Salmon's confluence with the Klamath River at Somes Bar. The creek drains an isolated and rugged wilderness area – there are no paved roads and only a few permanent residents in its watershed, including its tributary Bear Skull Creek. Lower Wooley Creek provides Class IV-V (very difficult) whitewater and is seldom run due to the lack of easy access. The Wooley Creek Trail provides access along the creek into the wilderness area. It is one of the few major trails in the area suitable for year-round use due to its low elevation.

== See also ==
- List of rivers of California
