= Martins Ferry =

Martins Ferry may refer to:

- Martins Ferry, California
- Martins Ferry, Ohio
