= Konomihu language =

Extinct Shastan language of America

Konomihu
- Native to: United States
- Region: Salmon River, northern California
- Ethnicity: Konomihu Shasta
- Extinct: 1940s
- Language family: Hokan ?: Shasta–Palaihnihan; Shastan; Konomihu

Language codes
- ISO 639-3: None (mis)
- Glottolog: kono1241
- Konomihu

Konomihu is an extinct Shastan language formerly spoken in northern California. There may have been only a few speakers even before contact, and they self-identified as Shasta by the turn of the 20th century.

Konomihu may have been the most divergent of the Shastan family, although it is difficult to tell, as there is little material on the language. Kroeber noted that "it is still questionable whether their speech is more properly a highly specialized aberration of Shasta or of an ancient and independent but moribund branch of Hokan from which Karok and Chimariko are descended together with Shasta." A wordlist was collected by Angulo in 1928, but not published; some words are documented and compared by Shasta proper by Shirley Silver in Shasta and Konomihu in 1980.

== Sources ==
- Mithun, Marianne (1999), The Languages of Native North America, Cambridge: Cambridge University Press
