= Klamath County, California =

Klamath County
- Former U.S. county in California
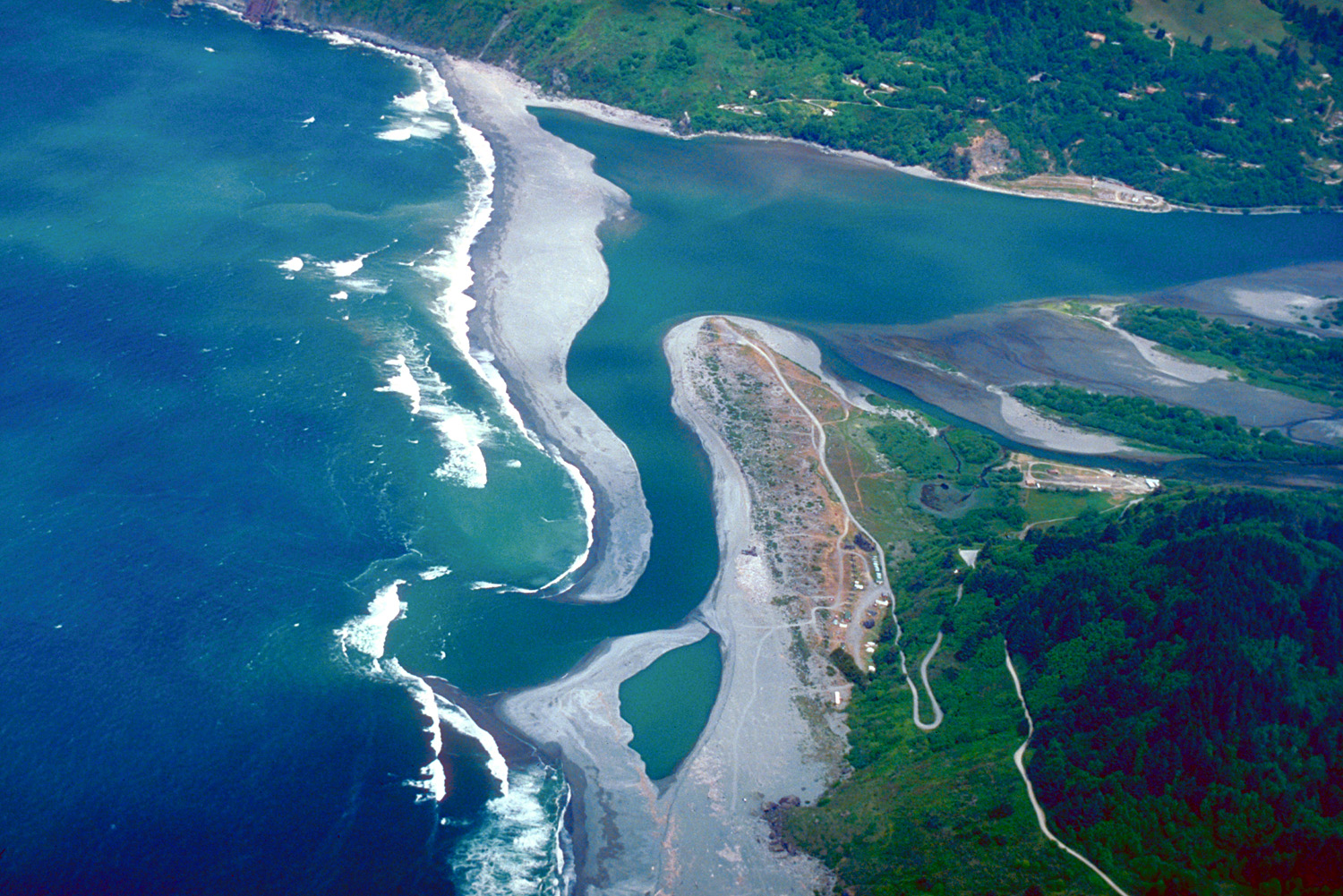
- Estuary of the Klamath River on the Pacific Ocean coast.
- Interactive map of Klamath County
- Founded: 1851
- Abolished: 1874

Klamath County was a county of California from 1851 to 1874. During its existence, the county seat moved twice and ultimately portions of the territory it once had were carved up and added to nearby counties. It was formed from the northwestern portion of Trinity County, and originally included all of the northwestern part of the state, from the Mad River in the south to Oregon in the north, from the Pacific Ocean in the west to the middle of what is now Siskiyou County in the east. It is the only county in California to be disestablished.

== History ==
The original county seat was Trinidad, on the county's southwestern coast. In 1854 the county seat was moved to Crescent City, because of its larger population. But the western portion of the county was unrepresentative of the mining interests in the eastern portion of the county, and so, in 1856, the county seat was moved inland, to Orleans Bar, now Orleans. In 1857, Del Norte County, including Crescent City, was split off from Klamath County.

The county's economy was never healthy after the gold rush. The area was contested with indigenous tribes. The "Klamath and Salmon River Indian "War""and the 1858-1864 "Bald Hills War" involved European-American vigilantes hunting down and killing most indigenous adult males and killing, capturing, or enslaving women and children. Many of the captive indigenous subsequently died of starvation and exposure at Fort Humboldt. The European-American settler's economy suffered from the effects of the Indian "wars", which disrupted the supplies to the settlements from the coastal towns. Worse still was the devastating effects of the Great Flood of 1862 which swept away the riverside settlements, mining works and ferries.

In 1874 Klamath County was finally abolished, divided between Siskiyou and Humboldt counties. Present day Del Norte County occupies part of Klamath County.

== Towns and other settlements of Klamath County ==
- Albeeville, 1862 - 1863, now in Humboldt County.
- Bald Hills, 1867 - 1878, now in Humboldt County.
- Bed Rock, 1870 - 1872.
- Bestville, 1850 -, now in Siskiyou County.
- Black Bear, 1869 - 1941, now in Siskiyou County.
- Cecilville, 1879 -, now in Siskiyou County.
- Cottage Grove, 1857 - 1898, now in Siskiyou County.
- Crescent City, 1853 until made part of Del Norte County in 1857.
- Elk Camp, 1859 - 1862, now in Humboldt County.
- Forks of Salmon, 1858 - 1871, 1872 -, now in Siskiyou County.
- Gullion's Bar, 1850 - on the Salmon River, now in Siskiyou County.
- Hoopa Valley, 1861 - to Humboldt County in 1875.
- Johnson's, 1850 - on the Klamath River, now in Siskiyou County.
- Klamath River Reservation 1858 - 1894, to Humboldt County in 1875.
- McDonald's Ferry, now in Humboldt County.
- Martins Ferry, 1861 - 1891, to Humboldt County in 1875.
- Nearp’s Flat, 1850 - ?, on the Salmon River, now in Siskiyou County.
- Negro Flat, 1850 - on the Salmon River, now in Siskiyou County.
- Orleans Bar, 1850 - to Humboldt County in 1875.
- Petersburgh, 1869 - 1876, to Siskiyou County in 1875.
- Red Cap, 1850 - ?, on the Klamath River, now in Humboldt County.41°15′36″N 123°36′22″W
- Sawyers Bar, 1850 - to Siskiyou County in 1875.
- Sommes Bar, to Siskiyou County in 1875.
- Trinidad, 1850 -, to Humboldt County in 1853.
- Weitchpec, now in Humboldt County.
- Wingate Bar, 1850 - ?, on the Klamath River.
- Yocumville 1869 - 1891, to Siskiyou County in 1875.
- Young's Ferry, now in Humboldt County.

== See also ==
- List of former United States counties
- List of California counties
