= Young's Ferry, California =

Coordinates: 41.3779°N 123.9042°W

Young's Ferry was a settlement in Klamath County on the Klamath River down stream from Weitchpec and McDonald's Ferry. On May 19, 1855, it was described by the Weekly Humboldt Times as being on the upstream boundary of the proposed Klamath River Indian Reservation. That reservation was described as extending 20 miles along the Klamath River from its mouth at the Pacific Ocean and one mile wide along each side of the river. The site is now within Humboldt County.
