= Albeeville, California =

Human settlement in the United States

Coordinates: 41°1′14.48″N 123°52′2.21″W

Albeeville (also, Albee) is a former settlement in Klamath County, now located in Humboldt County, California, United States. Albeeville was located on Redwood Creek, within an easy day's travel from Fort Gaston. The post office was named for Joseph Porter Albee, its first postmaster, who was murdered by Indians, and the Albeeville post office burned in November 1863.

== Location ==
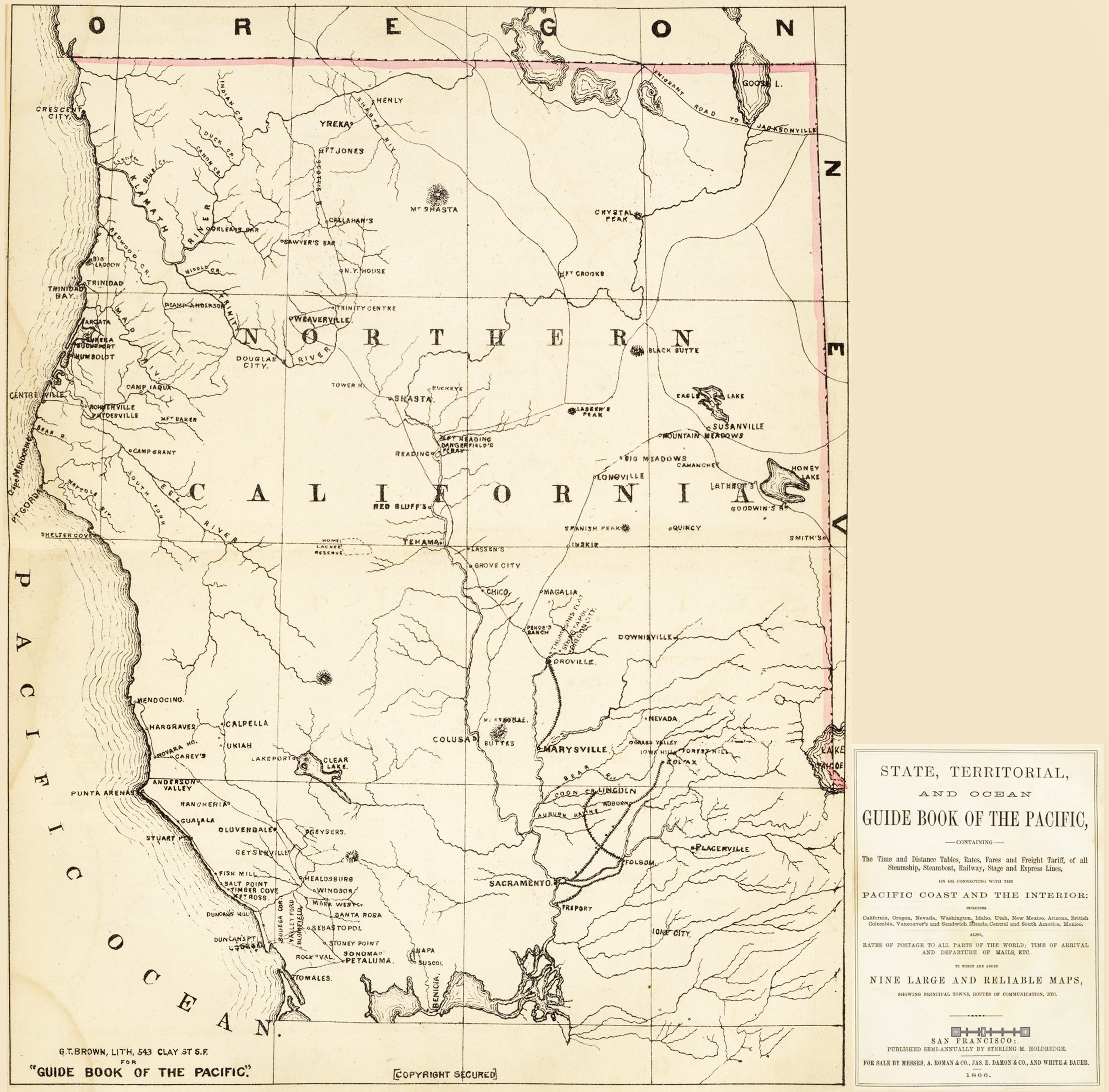
An 1866 map of the area shows Camp/Fort Anderson on Redwood Creek east of Trinidad

The location of Albeeville is described in an 1862 letter "Descending the river toward the ocean from Minor's to Fort Anderson... it is 1 mile (1.6 km); thence to Whitney's ranch 4 miles (6.4 km); thence to Albee's 4 miles (6.4 km), and thence to Elk Camp, 7 miles (11 km). Neil's and William's are between Albee's and Elk Camp." Another description of the location is, "... in Humboldt County at the old Albee ranch at the junction of North Fork and Redwood Creek." Albee's ranch was historically, "located about six miles downstream from Tom Bair's Ranch and about eight miles downstream from Fort Anderson".

== History ==
Joseph Porter Albee, born May 28, 1815, in Sandusky, Ohio, was raised by his parents Joseph and Electa (Crippen) Albee on a farm in New York State before moving to Michigan and marrying Caltha ("Calthea") Putnam of Ohio. They moved to DeKalb County, Illinois, until he joined the California Gold Rush and left his wife and children in Illinois. After mining for a short time, he became an ox freighter and a miner on the Trinity River, where he did well. He established a dairy at Weaverville, California, where his family rejoined him in 1852 via the Isthmus of Panama. Next, he drove horses and cattle to Humboldt, then brought his family from Weaverville and settled at Table Bluff in 1852, where they lived until 1856 when the family moved to Redwood Creek and started a cattle ranch and orchard.

Albee ran a hotel on the trail between Arcata and the Klamath Mines, and operated the post office from March 5, 1862, to April 2, 1863.

As a result of the Bald Hills War, some soldiers were quartered at Albee in 1862. When they left, he and his family left the ranch and went to Arcata. Albee returned to look after his ranch, believing his good dealings with Indians in the past would protect him, but was ambushed and killed on November 5, 1863; the house and barn were burned and the stock taken or run off. His family was left in difficult circumstances, but Mrs. Albee moved from Arcata to Clark & A Streets in Eureka, raised their eight surviving children, and accumulated property in the region until her own death in 1905 at age 90.

Albee Creek, a tributary of the Eel River, is named for their son Joseph Crippen Albee (b. February 19, 1858, Albee Ranch – August 8, 1944, Scotia, California).
