= McDonald's Ferry, California =

McDonald's Ferry was a settlement in Klamath County on the Klamath River downstream from Weitchpec, between it and Young's Ferry. The site is now within Humboldt County.
