= Bear Skull Creek =

River in California, U.S.

Coordinates: 41°27′52″N 123°17′21″W

Bear Skull Creek is a stream in the U.S. state of California. Bear Skull Creek is a tributary of Wooley Creek. It is located in Siskiyou County.
