= Somes Bar, California =

Unincorporated community in California, United States

- Unincorporated community
- Location within California Location within the United States
- Coordinates: 41°22′34″N 123°28′34″W
- Country: United States
- State: California
- County: Siskiyou
- Elevation: 682 ft (208 m)
- Time zone: UTC-8 (Pacific (PST))
  - Summer (DST): UTC-7 (PDT)
- ZIP code: 95568
- Area code: 530
- GNIS feature ID: 1659814

Somes Bar or Sommes Bar, is an unincorporated community in Siskiyou County, California, United States. Somes Bar is located on the Salmon River, 12 miles (19 km) northwest of Forks of Salmon. Somes Bar has a post office with ZIP code 95568, which opened in 1875. Somes Bar is named after George Somes, who found gold in the area in 1850. It was first located within Klamath County, California until it was absorbed by Siskiyou County when Klamath County was dissolved.

== Climate ==
This region experiences warm (but not hot) and dry summers, with no average monthly temperatures above 71.6 °F. According to the Köppen Climate Classification system, Somes Bar has a warm-summer Mediterranean climate, abbreviated "Csb" on climate maps.
