= Bear Creek (Oregon) =

Name of at least 123 streams in the U.S. state of Oregon

Bear Creek is the name of at least 123 streams in the U.S. state of Oregon, making it the most popular name for a stream in Oregon (followed by "Dry Creek" with 84 entries). Bear Creek may refer to:

Name	County	Mouth elevation	Mouth coordinates	USGS Map	GNIS ID
Bear Camp Creek (Douglas County, Oregon)	Douglas	679 ft (207 m)		Kelly Butte	1117345
Bear Canyon Creek (Harney County, Oregon)	Harney	4,649 ft (1,417 m)		Bear Canyon Butte	1137644
Bear Claw Creek (Morrow County, Oregon)	Morrow	3,763 ft (1,147 m)		Matlock Prairie	1137646
Bear Creek (Henley Basin, Baker County, Oregon)	Baker	2,123 ft (647 m)		Henley Basin	1130927
Bear Creek (Elkhorn Peak, Baker County, Oregon)	Baker	4,613 ft (1,406 m)		Elkhorn Peak	1117357
Bear Creek (Rail Gulch, Baker County, Oregon)	Baker	4,770 ft (1,450 m)		Rail Gulch	1137683
Bear Creek (Rhododendron, Clackamas County, Oregon)	Clackamas	1,362 ft (415 m)		Rhododendron	1137666
Bear Creek (Estacada, Clackamas County, Oregon)	Clackamas	551 ft (168 m)		Estacada	1137693
Bear Creek (Gawley Creek, Clackamas County, Oregon)	Clackamas	912 ft (278 m)		Gawley Creek	1117358
Bear Creek (Yoder, Clackamas County, Oregon)	Clackamas	98 ft (30 m)		Yoder	1117371
Bear Creek (Sunset Spring, Clatsop County, Oregon)	Clatsop	1,529 ft (466 m)		Sunset Spring	1117361
Bear Creek (Cathlamet Bay, Clatsop County, Oregon)	Clatsop	3 ft (0.91 m)		Cathlamet Bay	1117365
Bear Creek (Columbia County, Oregon)	Columbia	604 ft (184 m)		Vernonia	1117362
Bear Creek (Mount Bolivar, Coos County, Oregon)	Coos	1,923 ft (586 m)		Mount Bolivar	1154612
Bear Creek (Illahe, Coos County, Oregon)	Coos	2,051 ft (625 m)		Illahe	1137676
Bear Creek (Riverton, Coos County, Oregon)	Coos	7 ft (2.1 m)		Riverton	1117366
Bear Creek (Bowman Dam, Crook County, Oregon)	Crook	3,238 ft (987 m)		Bowman Dam	1137682
Bear Creek (Powell Mountain, Crook County, Oregon)	Crook	3,999 ft (1,219 m)		Powell Mountain	1137656
Bear Creek (Fourth of July Creek, Curry County, Oregon)	Curry	164 ft (50 m)		Fourth of July Creek	1137674
Bear Creek (Port Orford, Curry County, Oregon)	Curry	354 ft (108 m)		Port Orford	1137650
Bear Creek (Port Orford, Curry County, Oregon)	Curry	85 ft (26 m)		Port Orford	1154662
Bear Creek (Tenmile, Douglas County, Oregon)	Douglas	1,083 ft (330 m)		Tenmile	1117364
Bear Creek (Dutchman Butte, Douglas County, Oregon)	Douglas	1,165 ft (355 m)		Dutchman Butte	1117349
Bear Creek (Quines Creek, Douglas County, Oregon)	Douglas	1,558 ft (475 m)		Quines Creek	1117348
Bear Creek (Smith River Falls, Douglas County, Oregon)	Douglas	190 ft (58 m)		Smith River Falls	1137654
Bear Creek (Garwood Butte, Douglas County, Oregon)	Douglas	3,865 ft (1,178 m)		Garwood Butte	1134230
Bear Creek (Deer Head Point, Douglas County, Oregon)	Douglas	39 ft (12 m)		Deer Head Point	1137653
Bear Creek (Curtin, Douglas County, Oregon)	Douglas	407 ft (124 m)		Curtin	1117353
Bear Creek (Garwood Butte, Douglas County, Oregon)	Douglas	4,229 ft (1,289 m)		Garwood Butte	1137678
Bear Creek (Drain, Douglas County, Oregon)	Douglas	482 ft (147 m)		Drain	1117367
Bear Creek (Yellow Butte, Douglas County, Oregon)	Douglas	545 ft (166 m)		Yellow Butte	1117352
Bear Creek (Callahan, Douglas County, Oregon)	Douglas	597 ft (182 m)		Callahan	1117351
Bear Creek (Bone Mountain, Douglas County, Oregon)	Douglas	617 ft (188 m)		Bone Mountain	1137651
Bear Creek (Mount Gurney, Douglas County, Oregon)	Douglas	974 ft (297 m)		Mount Gurney	1132423
Bear Creek (Castle Creek, Grant County, Oregon)	Grant	3,379 ft (1,030 m)		Castle Creek	1137685
Bear Creek (Susanville, Grant County, Oregon)	Grant	3,402 ft (1,037 m)		Susanville	1137688
Bear Creek (Johnson Saddle, Grant County, Oregon)	Grant	3,674 ft (1,120 m)		Johnson Saddle	1117356
Bear Creek (Buck Trough Spring, Grant County, Oregon)	Grant	3,980 ft (1,210 m)		Buck Trough Spring	1137681
Bear Creek (Seneca, Grant County, Oregon)	Grant	4,675 ft (1,425 m)		Seneca	1137671
Bear Creek (Harney County, Oregon)	Harney	4,751 ft (1,448 m)		Alsup Mountain	1137680
Bear Creek (Hood River County, Oregon)	Hood River	2,034 ft (620 m)		Mount Hood North	1137667
Bear Creek (Rogue River)	Jackson	1,168 ft (356 m)		Sams Valley	1137669
Bear Creek (Onion Mountain, Josephine County, Oregon)	Josephine	1,283 ft (391 m)		Onion Mountain	1137649
Bear Creek (Holland, Josephine County, Oregon)	Josephine	1,562 ft (476 m)		Holland	1137648
Bear Creek (Klamath County, Oregon)	Klamath	4,685 ft (1,428 m)		Welch Butte	1137677
Bear Creek (Bridge Creek Draw, Lake County, Oregon)	Lake	4,639 ft (1,414 m)		Bridge Creek Draw	1137670
Bear Creek (Morgan Butte, Lake County, Oregon)	Lake	4,813 ft (1,467 m)		Morgan Butte	1137675
Bear Creek (Cheshire, Lane County, Oregon)	Lane	318 ft (97 m)		Cheshire	1117369
Bear Creek (Diamond Peak, Lane County, Oregon)	Lane	3,484 ft (1,062 m)		Diamond Peak	1137652
Bear Creek (Windy Peak, Lane County, Oregon)	Lane	364 ft (111 m)		Windy Peak	1137655
Bear Creek (Fivemile Creek, Lane County, Oregon)	Lane	43 ft (13 m)		Fivemile Creek	1137679
Bear Creek (Crow, Lane County, Oregon)	Lane	469 ft (143 m)		Crow	1119980
Bear Creek (Digger Mountain, Lane County, Oregon)	Lane	479 ft (146 m)		Digger Mountain	1153553
Bear Creek (Gunter, Lane County, Oregon)	Lane	482 ft (147 m)		Gunter	1117354
Bear Creek (Jasper, Lane County, Oregon)	Lane	495 ft (151 m)		Jasper	1117368
Bear Creek (Mount Hagan, Lane County, Oregon)	Lane	853 ft (260 m)		Mount Hagan	1117355
Bear Creek (Hellion Rapids, Lincoln County, Oregon)	Lincoln	141 ft (43 m)		Hellion Rapids	1137658
Bear Creek (Devils Lake, Lincoln County, Oregon)	Lincoln	20 ft (6.1 m)		Devils Lake	1153689
Bear Creek (Five Rivers, Lincoln County, Oregon)	Lincoln	213 ft (65 m)		Five Rivers	1137657
Bear Creek (Mowrey Landing, Lincoln County, Oregon)	Lincoln	23 ft (7.0 m)		Mowrey Landing	1137689
Bear Creek (Dolph, Lincoln County, Oregon)	Lincoln	269 ft (82 m)		Dolph	1137691
Bear Creek (Eddyville, Lincoln County, Oregon)	Lincoln	26 ft (7.9 m)		Eddyville	1117370
Bear Creek (Elk City, Lincoln County, Oregon)	Lincoln	43 ft (13 m)		Elk City	1137661
Bear Creek (Tidewater, Lincoln County, Oregon)	Lincoln	59 ft (18 m)		Tidewater	1137660
Bear Creek (Grass Mountain, Lincoln County, Oregon)	Lincoln	814 ft (248 m)		Grass Mountain	1137659
Bear Creek (Tidewater, Lincoln County, Oregon)	Lincoln	85 ft (26 m)		Tidewater	1137672
Bear Creek (Lincoln County, Oregon)	Lincoln	82 ft (25 m)		Neskowin	1137690
Bear Creek (Quartzville, Linn County, Oregon)	Linn	1,483 ft (452 m)		Quartzville	1137686
Bear Creek (Snow Peak, Linn County, Oregon)	Linn	682 ft (208 m)		Snow Peak	1131035
Bear Creek (Marion County, Oregon)	Marion	955 ft (291 m)		Mill City North	1130518
Bear Creek (Morrow County, Oregon)	Morrow	3,025 ft (922 m)		Madison Butte	1137663
Bear Creek (Multnomah County, Oregon)	Multnomah	1,076 ft (328 m)		Brightwood	1156900
Bear Creek (Polk County, Oregon)	Polk	656 ft (200 m)		Socialist Valley	1137662
Bear Creek (Trask, Tillamook County, Oregon)	Tillamook	194 ft (59 m)		Trask	1117360
Bear Creek (Beaver, Tillamook County, Oregon)	Tillamook	200 ft (61 m)		Beaver	1137665
Bear Creek (Tillamook, Tillamook County, Oregon)	Tillamook	26 ft (7.9 m)		Tillamook	1154410
Bear Creek (Dolph, Tillamook County, Oregon)	Tillamook	577 ft (176 m)		Dolph	1158119
Bear Creek (Dovre Peak, Tillamook County, Oregon)	Tillamook	751 ft (229 m)		Dovre Peak	1137664
Bear Creek (Nye, Umatilla County, Oregon)	Umatilla	1,962 ft (598 m)		Nye	1137695
Bear Creek (Bingham Springs, Umatilla County, Oregon)	Umatilla	2,185 ft (666 m)		Bingham Springs	1137698
Bear Creek (Tollgate, Umatilla County, Oregon)	Umatilla	2,447 ft (746 m)		Tollgate	1137668
Bear Creek (Thimbleberry Mountain, Umatilla County, Oregon)	Umatilla	2,746 ft (837 m)		Thimbleberry Mountain	1137696
Bear Creek (Bassey Creek, Umatilla County, Oregon)	Umatilla	3,294 ft (1,004 m)		Bassey Creek	1137694
Bear Creek (Kamela SE, Union County, Oregon)	Union	3,091 ft (942 m)		Kamela SE	1117372
Bear Creek (McIntyre Creek, Union County, Oregon)	Union	3,681 ft (1,122 m)		McIntyre Creek	1137692
Bear Creek (Troy, Wallowa County, Oregon)	Wallowa	1,578 ft (481 m)		Troy	1117363
Bear Creek (Elbow Creek, Wallowa County, Oregon)	Wallowa	2,005 ft (611 m)		Elbow Creek	1137699
Bear Creek (Teepee Butte, Wallowa County, Oregon)	Wallowa	2,539 ft (774 m)		Teepee Butte	1137647
Bear Creek (Wallowa, Wallowa County, Oregon)	Wallowa	2,881 ft (878 m)		Wallowa	1137697
Bear Creek (Cornucopia, Wallowa County, Oregon)	Wallowa	5,568 ft (1,697 m)		Cornucopia	1117359
Bear Creek (Painted Hills, Wheeler County, Oregon)	Wheeler	1,827 ft (557 m)		Painted Hills	1137687
Bear Creek (Mount Misery, Wheeler County, Oregon)	Wheeler	3,330 ft (1,010 m)		Mount Misery	1117347
Bear Creek (Antone, Wheeler County, Oregon)	Wheeler	4,715 ft (1,437 m)		Antone	1137684
Bear Lake Creek (Linn County, Oregon)	Linn	1,863 ft (568 m)		Idanha	1137725
Bear Pan Creek Remote, (Coos County, Oregon)	Coos	574 ft (175 m)		Remote	1132515
Bear Pen Creek Remote, (Coos County, Oregon)	Coos	253 ft (77 m)		Remote	1117350
Bear Valley Creek (Jefferson County, Oregon)	Jefferson	3,465 ft (1,056 m)		Candle Creek	1137762
Bear Wallow Creek (Tallowbox Mountain, Josephine County, Oregon)	Josephine	2,411 ft (735 m)		Tallowbox Mountain	1135059
Bear Wallow Creek (Williams, Josephine County, Oregon)	Josephine	2,438 ft (743 m)		Williams	1137767
Bear Wallow Creek (Umatilla County, Oregon)	Umatilla	3,881 ft (1,183 m)		Owens Butte	1137768
Canyon Creek (Jefferson County, Oregon)	Jefferson	2,877 ft (877 m)		Candle Creek	1139331
Deer Creek (Wallowa County, Oregon)	Wallowa	2,598 ft (792 m)		Minam	1140836
East Bear Creek (Wallowa County, Oregon)	Wallowa	1,719 ft (524 m)		Mountain View	1141503
Jackson Creek (Douglas County, Oregon)	Douglas	1,112 ft (339 m)		Tiller	1144199
Little Bear Creek (Clatsop County, Oregon)	Clatsop	52 ft (16 m)		Cathlamet Bay	1132297
Little Bear Creek (Coos County, Oregon)	Coos	154 ft (47 m)		Bill Peak	1123127
Little Bear Creek (Crook County, Oregon)	Crook	3,543 ft (1,080 m)		Rodman Rim	1145088
Little Bear Creek (Johnson Saddle, Grant County, Oregon)	Grant	3,714 ft (1,132 m)		Johnson Saddle	1123128
Little Bear Creek (Suplee, Grant County, Oregon)	Grant	4,403 ft (1,342 m)		Suplee	1157568
Little Bear Creek (Big Canyon, Grant County, Oregon)	Grant	4,895 ft (1,492 m)		Big Canyon	1145089
Little Bear Creek (Josephine County, Oregon)	Josephine	1,867 ft (569 m)		Holland	1154567
Little Bear Creek (Lake County, Oregon)	Lake	5,597 ft (1,706 m)		Coffeepot Creek	1145087
Little Bear Creek (Lane County, Oregon)	Lane	833 ft (254 m)		Mount Hagan	1123129
Little Bear Creek (Morrow County, Oregon)	Morrow	3,727 ft (1,136 m)		Madison Butte	1145085
Little Bear Creek (Union County, Oregon)	Union	3,862 ft (1,177 m)		Sullivan Gulch	1145086
Little Bear Creek (Wallowa County, Oregon)	Wallowa	3,589 ft (1,094 m)		Fox Point	1145090
North Fork Bear Creek (Crook County, Oregon)	Crook	3,451 ft (1,052 m)		Stephenson Mountain	1146904
Sheep Creek (Baker County, Oregon)	Baker	5,108 ft (1,557 m)		Little Baldy Mountain	1149318
South Fork Bear Creek (Windy Peak, Lane County, Oregon)	Lane	492 ft (150 m)		Windy Peak	1149928
South Fork Bear Creek (Goodwin Peak, Lane County, Oregon)	Lane	75 ft (23 m)		Goodwin Peak	1149927
Two Bear Creek (Douglas County, Oregon)	Douglas	5,187 ft (1,581 m)		Diamond Lake	1151603
Wallow Creek (Josephine County, Oregon)	Josephine	2,037 ft (621 m)		Murphy	1151856
West Bear Creek (Wallowa County, Oregon)	Wallowa	1,637 ft (499 m)		Mountain View	1152023
West Fork Little Bear Creek (Grant County, Oregon)	Grant	4,954 ft (1,510 m)		Big Canyon	1128857
