= Martins Ferry, California =

Martins Ferry, California Wahsekw (Yurok)
- Former settlement
- Location in California
- Coordinates: 41°12′29″N 123°45′19″W
- Country: United States
- State: California
- County: Humboldt
- Elevation: 315 ft (96 m)

Martins Ferry (Yurok: Wahsekw) is a former settlement in Klamath County and later in Humboldt County, California, United States. It lay on the Klamath River, at an elevation of 315 feet (96 m). It still appeared on maps as of 1983.

== History ==
A post office operated at Martins Ferry from 1861 to 1862 and from 1865 to 1891. There was a military fort at the place in the 1860s. The name honors John F. Martin, its first postmaster, who also operated a ferry.
