= Cecilville, California =

Unincorporated community in California, United States

Cecilville
- Unincorporated community
- Location within California Location within the United States
- Coordinates: 41°08′27″N 123°08′24″W
- Country: United States
- State: California
- County: Siskiyou

Cecilville (Karuk: íshirak) is a small unincorporated community in Siskiyou County, California, United States. It is on the south fork of the Salmon River and was established when the area was settled by miners during the Gold Rush. The community was named for a prospector. It was formerly in Klamath County before that county was dissolved and the part of that county, including Cecilville, was annexed by Siskiyou County.

== Climate ==
Climate data for Cecilville, California, 1991–2020 normals, extremes 1985–2003
Month	Jan	Feb	Mar	Apr	May	Jun	Jul	Aug	Sep	Oct	Nov	Dec	Year
Record high °F (°C)	66 (19)	77 (25)	81 (27)	92 (33)	99 (37)	106 (41)	111 (44)	110 (43)	106 (41)	98 (37)	78 (26)	62 (17)	111 (44)
Mean maximum °F (°C)	55.9 (13.3)	64.4 (18.0)	74.5 (23.6)	85.4 (29.7)	91.7 (33.2)	99.7 (37.6)	105.1 (40.6)	104.1 (40.1)	99.1 (37.3)	88.5 (31.4)	66.6 (19.2)	54.8 (12.7)	107.0 (41.7)
Mean daily maximum °F (°C)	44.6 (7.0)	51.4 (10.8)	58.6 (14.8)	65.5 (18.6)	75.4 (24.1)	84.7 (29.3)	95.9 (35.5)	93.9 (34.4)	89.3 (31.8)	69.7 (20.9)	53.7 (12.1)	42.5 (5.8)	68.8 (20.4)
Daily mean °F (°C)	37.4 (3.0)	41.2 (5.1)	46.0 (7.8)	50.7 (10.4)	58.7 (14.8)	65.5 (18.6)	74.1 (23.4)	72.1 (22.3)	67.2 (19.6)	53.5 (11.9)	43.4 (6.3)	36.5 (2.5)	53.9 (12.1)
Mean daily minimum °F (°C)	30.1 (−1.1)	30.9 (−0.6)	33.4 (0.8)	36.0 (2.2)	42.1 (5.6)	46.3 (7.9)	52.3 (11.3)	50.4 (10.2)	45.0 (7.2)	37.3 (2.9)	33.1 (0.6)	30.5 (−0.8)	39.0 (3.9)
Mean minimum °F (°C)	21.7 (−5.7)	21.6 (−5.8)	25.3 (−3.7)	27.7 (−2.4)	30.8 (−0.7)	36.3 (2.4)	42.8 (6.0)	42.2 (5.7)	36.7 (2.6)	28.6 (−1.9)	23.8 (−4.6)	18.7 (−7.4)	15.2 (−9.3)
Record low °F (°C)	13 (−11)	6 (−14)	22 (−6)	23 (−5)	28 (−2)	30 (−1)	38 (3)	38 (3)	33 (1)	22 (−6)	16 (−9)	2 (−17)	2 (−17)
Average precipitation inches (mm)	5.80 (147)	4.74 (120)	4.91 (125)	2.58 (66)	1.91 (49)	0.99 (25)	0.49 (12)	0.43 (11)	0.52 (13)	2.30 (58)	5.56 (141)	7.59 (193)	37.82 (960)
Average snowfall inches (cm)	1.7 (4.3)	3.5 (8.9)	0.9 (2.3)	0.8 (2.0)	0.0 (0.0)	0.0 (0.0)	0.0 (0.0)	0.0 (0.0)	0.0 (0.0)	0.0 (0.0)	0.6 (1.5)	3.4 (8.6)	10.9 (27.6)
Average precipitation days (≥ 0.01 in)	13.5	12.1	13.5	10.4	7.5	4.1	2.0	2.2	2.7	4.8	12.1	13.3	98.2
Average snowy days (≥ 0.1 in)	1.2	1.0	0.5	0.3	0.0	0.0	0.0	0.0	0.0	0.0	0.3	1.3	4.6
Source 1: NOAA (aver precip/precip days, average snow/snow days 1981-2010)
Source 2: WRCC (mean maxima and minima 1985-2003)
