= Shasta language =

Extinct language of Western US

Shasta
- Native to: United States
- Region: primarily northern California
- Ethnicity: Shasta people
- Extinct: 1978, with the death of Clara Wicks
- Language family: Hokan ?: Shasta–Palaihnihan; Shastan; Shasta
- Dialects: Ikirakácˑu (Oregon Shasta); Iruhikwáˑcˑu (Klamath River Shasta); Uwáˑtuhúcˑu (Scott Valley Shasta); Ahútˑireˀeˑcˑu (Shasta Valley Shasta)

Language codes
- ISO 639-3: sht
- Glottolog: shas1239
- Shasta

Shasta is an extinct Shastan language formerly spoken from northern California into southwestern Oregon. It was spoken in a number of dialects, possibly including Okwanuchu. The last fluent speaker, Clara Wicks, died in 1978, and by 1980, only two first language speakers, both elderly, were alive. Today, all ethnic Shasta people speak English as their first language.

== Name ==
The origins of the term "Shasta" are vague; the Shasta called themselves "Kahosadi" (plain speakers). Peter Skene Ogden is the first recorded Euro-American to have used a variation of the term "Shasta", which he spelled "Sastise," "Castice," "Sistise," "Sarti," and "Sasty".

== Dialects ==
According to Golla, there were four distinct dialects of Shasta:

- Ikirakácˑu (Oregon Shasta)
- Iruhikwáˑcˑu (Klamath River Shasta)
- Uwáˑtuhúcˑu (Scott Valley Shasta)
- Ahútˑireˀeˑcˑu (Shasta Valley Shasta)

== Phonology ==
=== Consonants ===
		Bilabial	Alveolar		Palatal	Velar	Glottal
		Bilabial	plain	affricated	Palatal	Velar	Glottal
Stop	ejective	pʼ pʼː	tʼ tʼː	tsʼ t͡sʼː	t͡ʃʼ t͡ʃʼː	kʼ kʼː	
Stop	unaspirated	p pː	t tː	ts t͡sː	t͡ʃ t͡ʃː	k kː	ʔ ʔː
Fricative			s sː			x xː	h hː
Nasal		m mː	n nː				
Approximant			r		j	w	

The length of a consonant distinguishes meaning in Shasta words. All stops, fricatives and nasals can occur as long or short in Shasta, but approximants /r j w/ only occur as short consonants. Minimal pairs and near minimal pairs are shown below:

- /t͡ʃákàráx/ a gnat vs. /t͡sàkːírʔ/ a board
- /ʔátʼùʔ/ nothing vs. /ʔátʼːùʔ/ wild sunflower
- /ʔìsíkʼːàʔ/ a person vs. /ʔìsːíkʼ/ cold

=== Vowels ===
Shasta has four vowels, /i e a u/, with contrastive length, and two tones: high and low.

	Front		Central		Back	
	short	long	short	long	short	long
Close	i	iː			u	uː
Mid	e	eː				
Open			a	aː		

=== Tones ===
Shasta vowels can have low or high tones. High tones are marked by an acute accent ⟨′⟩ in the orthography devised by Silver (1966), whereas low tones are left unmarked. Examples for the vowel /u/ are given below:

IPA	Orthography
/ú/	ú
/úː/	úˑ
/ù/	u
/ùː/	uˑ

== Orthography ==
Silver (1966) devised a spelling system for distinguishing consonants and vowels in Shasta. Long phonemes are represented with the symbol ⟨ˑ⟩ following the character (e.g. ⟨cˑ⟩ and ⟨eˑ⟩ for /t͡sː/ and /eː/, respectively); ejectives are indicated by an apostrophe written over the character (e.g. ⟨p̓⟩ for /pʼ/). The phoneme /j/ is represented by ⟨y⟩, and the glottal stop /ʔ/ is represented by the superscript IPA symbol ⟨ˀ⟩. The letters ⟨b d f g j l q v z⟩ are not used to represent Shasta sounds.

Shasta alphabet
A a	Aˑ aˑ	C c	Cˑ cˑ	C̓ c̓	C̓ˑ c̓ˑ	Č č	Čˑ čˑ	Č̓ č̓	Č̓ˑ č̓ˑ
E e	Eˑ eˑ	H h	Hˑ hˑ	I i	Iˑ iˑ	K k	Kˑ kˑ	K̓ k̓	K̓ˑ k̓ˑ
M m	Mˑ mˑ	N n	Nˑ nˑ	P p	Pˑ pˑ	P̓ p̓	P̓ˑ p̓ˑ	R r	S s
Sˑ sˑ	T t	Tˑ tˑ	T̓ t̓	T̓ˑ t̓ˑ	U u	Uˑ uˑ	W w	X x	Xˑ xˑ
Y y	ˀ	ˀˑ

== Bibliography ==
- Golla, Victor (2011), California Indian languages, Berkeley: University of California Press
- Mithun, Marianne (1999), The Languages of Native North America, Cambridge: Cambridge University Press
