= Shastan languages =

Extinct language family

Shastan
- Sastean
- Geographic distribution: Northern California
- Ethnicity: Shasta, Okwanuchu
- Extinct: 1978, with the death of Clara Wicks (Shasta)
- Linguistic classification: Hokan ?: Shasta–Palaihnihan ?; Shastan
- Subdivisions: Konomihu; New River Shasta; Okwanuchu; Shasta

Language codes
- ISO 639-3: sht
- Glottolog: shas1238
- Pre-contact distribution of Shastan languages

The Shastan (or Sastean) languages are an extinct language family which consists of four languages, formerly spoken in what is now northern California and southern Oregon:

- Shastan
  - † Konomihu
  - † New River Shasta
  - † Okwanuchu
  - † Shasta (also known as Shastika)

Konomihu appears to have been the most divergent Shastan language. Okwanuchu may have been a dialect of Shasta proper, which is known to have had a number of dialects.

Shasta was the last language to become extinct. Three elderly speakers were reported in the 1980s.

Shastan has often been considered to be in the hypothetical Hokan stock.
