= Okwanuchu language =

Extinct Shastan language of California, US

Okwanuchu
- Native to: United States
- Region: northern California
- Ethnicity: Okwanuchu
- Era: last attested 1930s
- Language family: Hokan ?: Shasta–Palaihnihan ?; Shastan; Shasta proper?; Okwanuchu

Language codes
- ISO 639-3: None (mis)
- Glottolog: okwa1235
- Okwanuchu

Okwanuchu is an extinct Shastan language formerly spoken in northern California. It is unusual in that much of its vocabulary is not derived from a Shastan language, but from some unknown substrate.

== Classification ==
Kroeber described the language as "peculiar. Many words are practically pure Shasta; others are distorted to the very verge of recognizability, or utterly different." Golla speculates at length that the language may have mixed in another, non-Shasta language. Du Bois, interviewing a survivor of a group that the Wintu called Waymaq ("north people"), who she believed were probably identical to the Okwanuchu, recorded some words, including atsa ("water"). Golla writes that eighteen more words are found, under the name "Wailaki [also meaning 'North People'] on McCloud", in an 1884 work by Jeremiah Curtin; he too recorded atsa ("water"), and five words not found elsewhere in Shastan.

== Sources ==
- Mithun, Marianne (1999), The Languages of Native North America, Cambridge: Cambridge University Press
