= Fort Anderson (California) =

Fort Anderson Camp Anderson
- Military post
- Location in California
- Coordinates: 40°58′16″N 123°50′25″W
- Country: United States
- State: California
- County: Humboldt County
- Established: 1862, 1864-1866
- Elevation: 804 ft (245 m)

Fort Anderson or Camp Anderson was a military post first established in May 1862 by California Volunteers during the Bald Hills War. It was located on Redwood Creek, below its confluence with Minor Creek, between Fort Humboldt and Fort Gaston. It was abandoned in the winter of 1862, but reestablished in 1864 and finally closed in 1866.
