= Forks of Salmon, California =

Unincorporated community in California, United States

Coordinates: 41°15′30″N 123°19′18″W

Forks of Salmon is an unincorporated community of Siskiyou County in northern California, United States. The town is situated at the confluence of the north and south forks of the Salmon River, hence its name. The ZIP Code is 96031. The community is served by area code 530. The area is very sparsely populated and has no utility-provided electricity or cellular service. Over 98% of the surrounding land is national forest managed by the U.S. Forest Service.

== History ==
Prior to colonization in 1850, Forks of Salmon was the site of several Konomihu villages. It then became a California Gold Rush settlement in the now defunct Klamath County. It has had its own post office from September 30, 1858, until today, with a short break from October 16, 1871, to August 28, 1872.

On February 18, 1995 Jerry Davidson was shot and killed by J.D. Greiner in Forks of Salmon. Greiner was arrested for first degree murder, but was exonerated and the death was determined to have taken place in self-defense.

== Politics ==
In the state legislature, Forks of Salmon is in the 1st senatorial district, represented by Republican Megan Dahle, and the 1st Assembly district, represented by Republican Heather Hadwick.

Federally, Forks of Salmon is in California's 1st congressional district, represented by Republican James Gallagher.

== Notable people ==
- Gabe Jennings, middle-distance runner and Summer 2000 Olympian, lived in Forks of Salmon until age 13
- Rush Sturges, American professional whitewater kayaker, film maker, and musician, was raised in Forks of Salmon.
