= Orleans, California =

Unincorporated community in Humboldt County, California

Orleans Panamnik
- Unincorporated community
- Location in California Orleans (the United States)
- Coordinates: 41°18′05″N 123°32′28″W
- Country: United States
- State: California
- County: Humboldt
- Elevation: 404 ft (123 m)
- ZIP code: 95556
- Area code: 530
- FIPS code: 06-54288
- GNIS feature ID: 264396

Orleans (formerly New Orleans Bar and Orleans Bar; Karuk: Panamnik) is an unincorporated community in Humboldt County, California, United States. It is located 12 miles (19 km) northeast of Weitchpec along State Route 96 (the "Bigfoot Scenic Byway"), at an elevation of 404 feet (123 m). Its ZIP Code is 95556. It is served by area code 530. The community is within the Six Rivers National Forest and contains a district ranger's office of the National Forest.

Orleans is within the historical territory of the Karuk Tribe of California. The original indigenous settlement was named Panamnik. When European-American miners arrived, they named their settlement New Orleans Bar. It was renamed Orleans Bar in 1855 when it became the county seat of the now-defunct Klamath County. The Orleans post office was established on December 2, 1857.

Orleans is the nearest inhabited community to the site of the famous Patterson–Gimlin filming of a purported Bigfoot, which is in a remote area about 10 miles (16 km) northeast of Orleans.

== Government ==
In the California State Legislature, Orleans is in the 2nd senatorial district, represented by Democrat Mike McGuire, and the 2nd Assembly district, represented by Democrat Chris Rogers.

In the United States House of Representatives, Orleans is in California's 2nd congressional district, represented by Democrat Jared Huffman.

== Climate ==
Orleans has a Hot-summer Mediterranean climate (Csa) according to the Köppen climate classification system.

Climate data for Orleans, California, 1991–2020 normals, extremes 1903–present
Month	Jan	Feb	Mar	Apr	May	Jun	Jul	Aug	Sep	Oct	Nov	Dec	Year
Record high °F (°C)	71 (22)	83 (28)	96 (36)	101 (38)	109 (43)	111 (44)	117 (47)	116 (47)	113 (45)	102 (39)	85 (29)	72 (22)	117 (47)
Mean maximum °F (°C)	58.7 (14.8)	66.4 (19.1)	76.0 (24.4)	84.6 (29.2)	92.5 (33.6)	98.3 (36.8)	103.5 (39.7)	101.9 (38.8)	97.7 (36.5)	83.7 (28.7)	67.5 (19.7)	58.3 (14.6)	104.7 (40.4)
Mean daily maximum °F (°C)	49.6 (9.8)	54.9 (12.7)	61.8 (16.6)	68.3 (20.2)	76.7 (24.8)	83.1 (28.4)	92.0 (33.3)	91.0 (32.8)	85.8 (29.9)	70.9 (21.6)	55.6 (13.1)	47.9 (8.8)	69.8 (21.0)
Daily mean °F (°C)	43.4 (6.3)	47.0 (8.3)	51.4 (10.8)	55.8 (13.2)	62.3 (16.8)	67.6 (19.8)	74.4 (23.6)	73.4 (23.0)	68.7 (20.4)	58.6 (14.8)	48.8 (9.3)	42.5 (5.8)	57.8 (14.3)
Mean daily minimum °F (°C)	37.3 (2.9)	39.1 (3.9)	41.0 (5.0)	43.3 (6.3)	47.9 (8.8)	52.1 (11.2)	56.8 (13.8)	55.7 (13.2)	51.5 (10.8)	46.4 (8.0)	41.9 (5.5)	37.1 (2.8)	45.8 (7.7)
Mean minimum °F (°C)	27.4 (−2.6)	29.9 (−1.2)	32.6 (0.3)	34.3 (1.3)	39.6 (4.2)	44.1 (6.7)	48.9 (9.4)	48.6 (9.2)	44.0 (6.7)	37.4 (3.0)	31.5 (−0.3)	28.3 (−2.1)	24.2 (−4.3)
Record low °F (°C)	9 (−13)	16 (−9)	22 (−6)	25 (−4)	20 (−7)	33 (1)	38 (3)	39 (4)	28 (−2)	24 (−4)	17 (−8)	5 (−15)	5 (−15)
Average precipitation inches (mm)	9.39 (239)	6.93 (176)	6.38 (162)	3.97 (101)	2.25 (57)	0.89 (23)	0.19 (4.8)	0.15 (3.8)	0.76 (19)	3.52 (89)	6.81 (173)	10.49 (266)	51.73 (1,313.6)
Average snowfall inches (cm)	0.1 (0.25)	1.5 (3.8)	0.2 (0.51)	0.0 (0.0)	0.0 (0.0)	0.0 (0.0)	0.0 (0.0)	0.0 (0.0)	0.0 (0.0)	0.0 (0.0)	0.0 (0.0)	1.0 (2.5)	2.8 (7.06)
Average precipitation days (≥ 0.01 in)	15.7	13.8	15.0	11.5	7.7	3.4	1.0	1.2	2.1	6.6	13.9	17.1	109.0
Average snowy days (≥ 0.1 in)	0.4	0.6	0.4	0.0	0.0	0.0	0.0	0.0	0.0	0.0	0.0	0.8	2.2
Source 1: NOAA
Source 2: National Weather Service
