= Salmon River (California) =

River in California, United States

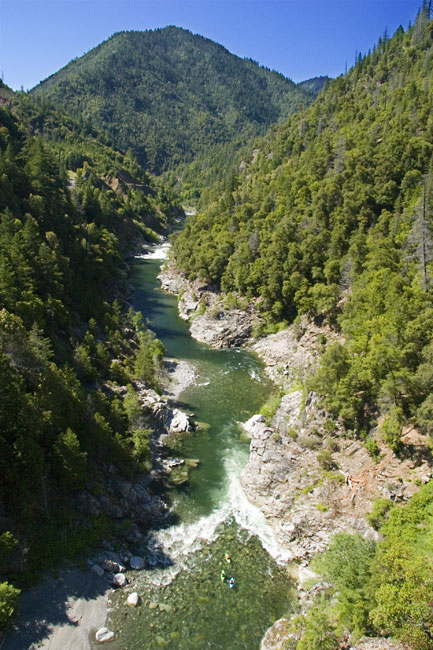
- Salmon River, California above the Wooley Creek confluence.

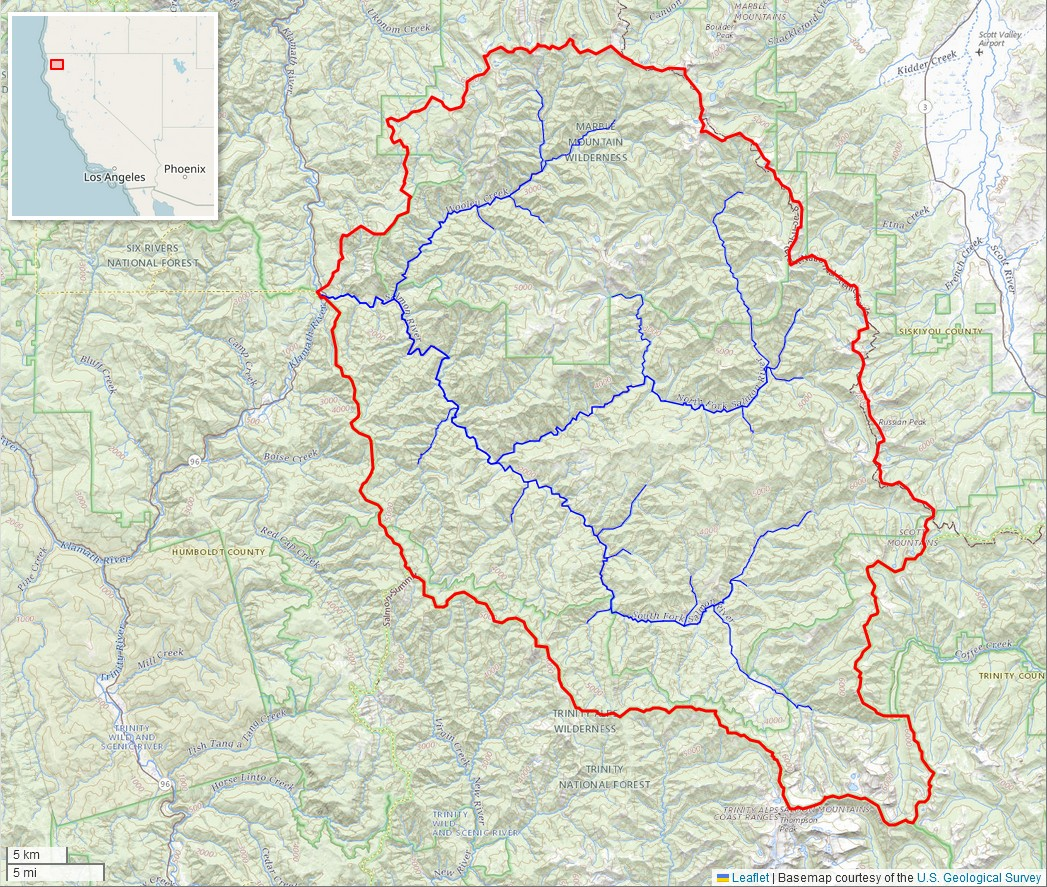
- Salmon River watershed (Interactive map)

Location
- Country: United States
- State: California

Physical characteristics
- Source: Confluence of North and South Forks
  - location: Forks of Salmon
  - coordinates: 41°15′24″N 123°19′24″W
  - elevation: 1,180 ft (360 m)
- Mouth: Klamath River
  - location: Somes Bar
  - coordinates: 41°22′39″N 123°29′36″W
  - elevation: 466 ft (142 m)
- Length: 19.6 mi (31.5 km)
- Basin size: 751 sq mi (1,950 km^{2})
- Discharge
  - location: Somes Bar, near mouth
  - average: 1,792 cu ft/s (50.7 m^{3}/s)
  - minimum: 97.5 cu ft/s (2.76 m^{3}/s)
  - maximum: 133,000 cu ft/s (3,800 m^{3}/s)

National Wild and Scenic River
- Designated: January 19, 1981

The Salmon River is a 19.6-mile-long (31.5 km) tributary to the Klamath River in western Siskiyou County, California.

== Course ==
The river has its origins in the high mountains of the Trinity Alps, Russian Mountains, and Marble Mountains (all sub-ranges of the larger Klamath Mountains). The Salmon River comprises two forks, the North Fork and the South Fork, which join at the hamlet of Forks of Salmon, California to form the 19.6-mile (31.5 km) long mainstem Salmon River. A large tributary stream, Wooley Creek, joins the mainstem Salmon River about 4 miles (6 km) from its mouth at Somes Bar, and is nearly as large as the North Fork. The lower portion of the Salmon River's southwestern divide defines the boundary of Siskiyou County and Humboldt County.

== Watershed ==
The river's 751-square-mile (1,950 km^{2}) watershed is entirely within the Klamath National Forest, and less than two percent of the land area is privately owned. Nearly half of the watershed is federally protected wilderness area, including portions of the Trinity Alps Wilderness on the south, the Russian Wilderness on the east, and the Marble Mountain Wilderness on the north. Another twenty-five percent of the watershed is designated as Late Successional Reserve under the Northwest Forest Plan and is managed to enhance and retain old-growth forest characteristics and habitat.

== Ecology ==
Unlike most other large California rivers, the Salmon is completely free flowing, with no dams or significant flow diversions of any kind. It is one of the most pristine areas in the Klamath River system and one of California's most pristine rivers. It retains the only viable population of wild spring Chinook salmon in the Klamath watershed and offers some of the best West Coast habitat for salmon, steelhead, green sturgeon, rainbow trout, Pacific lamprey, and other fish. The mainstem Salmon River, its North Fork, South Fork, and Wooley Creek are part of the National Wild and Scenic Rivers System, having been designated by Secretary of the Interior Cecil D. Andrus in January 1981, who was acting on California governor Jerry Brown's petition to add the rivers to the federal Wild and Scenic Rivers System.

Wildfires are the most significant mechanism of ecological change and one of the greatest threats to the river and its watershed. Fires are a natural part of this ecosystem, but are now often fueled by logging slash and fuels accumulated through decades of fire suppression efforts and therefore burn much hotter, more intensely, and more frequently than they would otherwise naturally burn. Large fires in 1977, 1987, 1994, 2006, 2008, 2013, 2014, and 2017 have contributed to increased erosion, causing increases in sediment in the river and its tributaries. The excessive sediment degrades the habitat of aquatic organisms, particularly for coho salmon, Chinook salmon, sturgeon and steelhead.
