= John Daggett =

American politician

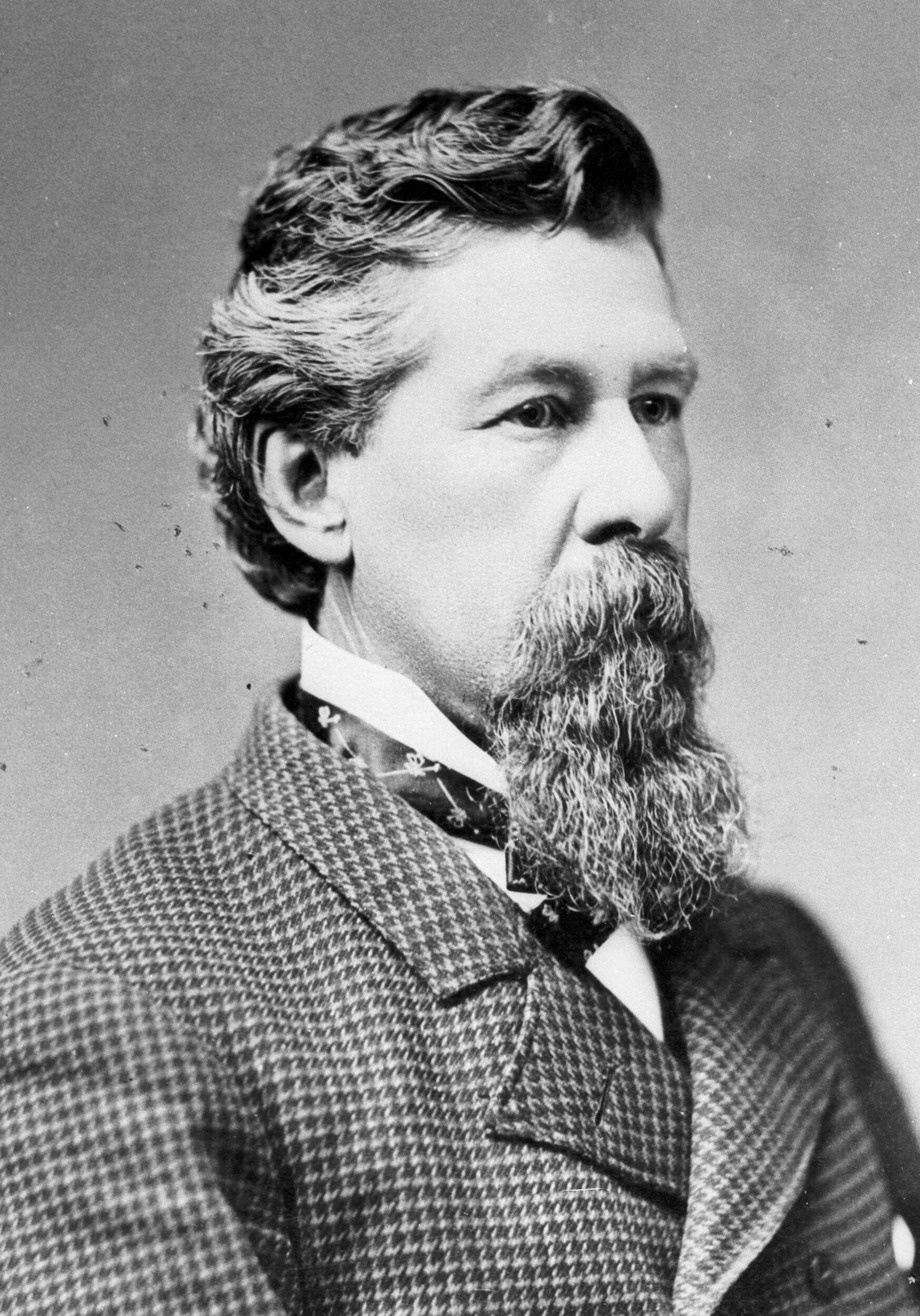
- Portrait by I. W. Taber c. 1885

16th Lieutenant Governor of California
- In office January 10, 1883 – January 8, 1887
- Governor: George Stoneman
- Preceded by: John Mansfield
- Succeeded by: Robert Waterman

Personal details
- Born: May 9, 1833 Newark, New York, US
- Died: August 30, 1919 (aged 86) Black Bear, California, US
- Party: Democratic

John Daggett (May 9, 1833 – August 30, 1919) was an American industrialist and politician who served as the 16th lieutenant governor of California from 1883 to 1887. He was involved in gold and silver mining in California and later served as Superintendent of the United States Mint at San Francisco from 1893 to 1897.

== Biography ==
=== Early life ===
Daggett was born in Newark, New York on May 9, 1833. At age 19 he moved to California with his brother David. In the 1852 Sacramento Census, John of 19 years old was recorded as black smith. David of 29 years was recorded as Machinist. No mention of Mining for gold in Nevada during 1852 and 1853 was yet confirmed. The only reference for this small fact came from the newspaper published obituary in 1919. The 1860 census was not found but the 1870 and 1880 census recorded Daggett in some mining venture.

He bought into the Black Bear Mine in 1862, sold out in 1863, reopened it in 1866, and sold out again in 1872, ultimately buying it back once more in 1884. Daggett also held an interest in the Calico Silver Mine in San Bernardino County. The area around this site was later renamed Daggett in his honor.

=== Politicial career ===
A Democrat, Daggett was elected to the California State Assembly in 1858, and re-elected in 1859 and 1880. Daggett was elected lieutenant governor in 1882, and served from 1883 to 1887.

As lieutenant governor, Daggett drew the ire of Democratic legislators seeking to pass legislation restricting the state's powerful railroad interests in an 1884 special session of the Legislature. After votes on a bill regulating the railroads tied in the State Senate, Daggett sided with a bloc of conservative Democratic senators and cast tie-breaking votes to block the legislation. Daggett's decision to side with conservative Democrats and the railroads led to his formal expulsion from the Democratic Party at a June 1884 state convention in Stockton dominated by anti-railroad Democrats. Daggett would later be restored to a formal role with the party at a subsequent convention in 1886, where he was elected first vice president of the state central committee.

In 1895 he was nominated for U.S. Senate, but lost to Republican George C. Perkins.

=== Superintendent of the San Francisco Mint ===
On May 18, 1893, he was nominated by President Grover Cleveland to serve as Superintendent of the United States Mint at San Francisco, a position he held until 1897.

Daggett is associated with the rare 1894-S Barber dime. One version of the story indicates that the 24 coins were struck on June 9, 1894, to provide a balance of $2.40 needed to close a bullion account at the Mint June 30, 1894. It was anticipated that more dimes would be struck that year, albeit two or three pieces were obtained by Mint employees eager to have a new dime (with two or three going to Chief Coiner Charles Gorham). The balance were placed in coin bags, destined for circulation.

Another story goes that Daggett had 24 dimes struck as a special request for some visiting bankers. According to daughter Hallie as recounted much later, her father presented three coins each to seven people, with the remaining three given to her with instructions to save them until she was as old as he was, at which time she would be able to sell them for a good price. Apparently, she spent one coin on ice cream on the way home; this now well-worn coin is said to have sold for $2.40 in Gimbel's department store in New York City in 1957 and it sold for $34,100 at auction in 1980. Much later Hallie sold the remaining two dimes to California dealer Earl Parker, with one selling in 2007 for $1.9 million.

=== Death ===
He died in Black Bear, California, in 1919.

Political offices
Preceded by John Mansfield	Lieutenant Governor of California; 1883–1887	Succeeded by Robert Waterman
