= BayTV =

- Country: United States
- Broadcast area: San Francisco Bay Area
- Headquarters: San Francisco, California

Programming
- Language: English
- Picture format: 480i (SDTV)

Ownership
- Owner: Chronicle Publishing Company (51%)/ Tele-Communications, Inc. (49%) (1994–1999); Young Broadcasting (51%)/ AT&T Broadband (49%) (1999–2001)
- Sister channels: KRON-TV

History
- Launched: July 1, 1994; 31 years ago
- Closed: August 30, 2001; 24 years ago (7 years, 60 days)
- Replaced by: Food Network (on AT&T Broadband systems)

BayTV was a 24-hour regional cable news and sports channel that served the San Francisco Bay Area and operated from July 1994 to August 2001. It was originally owned as a joint venture between the locally based Chronicle Publishing Company (which owned a controlling 51% interest) and cable provider Tele-Communications, Inc. (which owned the remaining 49% share). Young Broadcasting acquired majority control of the channel after it acquired parent television station KRON-TV (channel 4) in November 1999, while TCI's interest transferred to AT&T Broadband upon its acquisition of TCI earlier that year.

The channel operated from KRON-TV's (now-former) studio facilities at 1001 Van Ness Avenue in the Western Addition neighborhood of San Francisco.

== History ==
The channel launched on July 1, 1994, operating as companion service to NBC affiliate KRON-TV (channel 4; now a The CW affiliate) The company was founded by the San Francisco-based Chronicle Publishing Company, in conjunction with Tele-Communications, Inc. (TCI), which carried it on cable channel 35 throughout the provider's San Francisco-Oakland-San Jose service area, and its affiliate company Liberty Media. Both companies launched Starz earlier. When BayTV debuted, its programming primarily consisted of rebroadcasts of KRON-TV's news programs, as well as some limited news and talk content exclusive to the channel (including the morning newscast BayTV Morning and a video simulcast of KRON sports director Gary Radnich's midday sports talk show on KNBR (680 AM), The Gary Radnich Show). The channel originally utilized equipment formerly used by its parent station, with a separate staff of writers and producers.

On June 16, 1999, the deYoung family announced their intention to liquidate Chronicle Publishing's assets, including KRON-TV (as well as sister stations KAKE-TV in Wichita and WOWT in Omaha, which were both sold to Benedek Broadcasting), BayTV and the San Francisco Chronicle (which it sold to the Hearst Corporation for $295 million in October of that year). Around the same time, TCI's minority share in BayTV was sold to AT&T Corporation, as part of the company's acquisition of the provider (which became AT&T Broadband). KRON and Chronicle's majority interest in BayTV were purchased by New York City-based Young Broadcasting for US$737 million cash and $13 million in stock (rising to $823 million by the sale's closure) on November 16, 1999. The transaction was supposed to be completed by April 2000, however finalization of the deal was delayed by two months after former Chronicle editor Clint Reilly filed a lawsuit to block the Hearst Corporation's purchase of the newspaper.

On February 10, 2001, KRON station management decided to consolidate BayTV's news departments with that of KRON, resulting in the layoffs of 17 staff members employed with the channel. On July 2, Young Broadcasting announced that BayTV would be shut down after AT&T Broadband (which has since been sold to Comcast) informed the company that it would stop carrying the channel at the end of that month (AT&T Broadband spokesperson Andrew Johnson stated to the San Francisco Chronicle that the channel was a "financial drain on [AT&T]" as its viewership was insufficient to justify the heavy investments made by the partners, although now-former KRON general manager Paul "Dino" Dinovitz acknowledged BayTV turned a profit for the first time in 2001); most of BayTV's 44 remaining full-time employees were terminated. Originally slated to close on July 31, the channel ceased operations on August 30, 2001; AT&T replaced BayTV with the Food Network, which was moved to the provider's expanded basic tier on its Bay Area systems.

== Programming ==
The programming format of BayTV was modeled similarly to that of news-talk radio stations, featuring a mix of full-length newscasts produced by KRON's news department – which comprised much of the channel's daytime and evening schedule – and personality-driven talk and local interest programs (which were preceded by news updates produced by BayTV news staff).

Throughout its seven-year existence, BayTV underwent several changes to its programming, originally focusing mainly on news and talk programs (including the Pete Wilson-hosted political affairs program Take Issue; the interview program Close-Up with Belva Davis; and book discussion series Bookmark). By the late 1990s, it also incorporated cooking shows (such as Bay Cafe), consumer news and movie review programs (such as All Consuming, hosted by Laurel Pallock of the consumer fraud unit of the San Francisco District Attorney's Office; and Talkin' Pictures, hosted by longtime KRON film critic Jan Wahl).

In March 1998, the channel debuted an hour-long newscast at 9:00 p.m., which utilized staff from both the BayTV and KRON news departments with limited duplication of news content from the two operations. Originally co-anchored by Michelle Blaine and longtime KRON anchor Evan White on weeknights and Diana Yee on weekends, the program was reduced to a half-hour – matching the existing length of the weekend editions of the broadcast – on February 12, 2001, as a result of budget cuts related to the consolidation of the KRON and BayTV news departments (KRON would revive the 9:00 p.m. newscast as part of its schedule, after it became an independent station on January 1, 2002). The channel also rebroadcast KRON-TV's hour-long 6:00 p.m. newscast one hour after its initial broadcast each night at 7:00 p.m.

The channel also produced New Media News, a half-hour Silicon Valley-focused technology newsmagazine which aired nationally on Mind Extension University/Knowledge TV from 1995 until it was sold to Discovery Communications in 1999; the daily program was relaunched in February 2000 as Next Step (a title previously used by a separate technology program co-produced by KRON and the Discovery Channel that aired from 1994 to 1997) through a content agreement with Imagine Media-owned magazine Business 2.0.

=== Sports programming ===
In additional to its local programming, BayTV also carried a moderate amount of sports programming. Until the team moved its over-the-air telecasts to San Jose independent station KICU-TV (channel 36) in 1999, the channel carried a limited schedule of Major League Baseball games from the Oakland Athletics that KRON could not air due to its NBC programming commitments, as well as weekly news conferences held by the head coaches of the San Francisco 49ers and Oakland Raiders.

In March 1997, BayTV signed a three-year programming agreement with Fox Sports West, under which it carried the daily news program Fox Sports News and select sports events aired nationally by Fox Sports Net (including Major League Baseball games on Thursday nights during the regular season, and college basketball games not carried by Fox Sports Net Bay Area due to scheduling conflicts with events featuring local and state teams). The Fox Sports Net agreement ended on January 22, 1998, with most of the programming moving to newly converted FSN outlet SportsChannel Bay Area, which rebranded as Fox Sports Bay Area on that date (Fox Sports News continued to air on BayTV until March 31, 1998; most of FSN's Pac-10 telecasts also remained on the channel until the package transferred to Fox Sports Bay Area, which aired a limited number of games beforehand, in January 2000).

Much of BayTV's sports programming consisted of coverage involving college and high school teams from around Northern California. In 1997, BayTV began airing a featured "Game of the Week" involving Bay Area schools on Friday nights during the high school football regular season. It also broadcast statewide boys' and girls' high school basketball tournament finals and football championship games sanctioned by the California Interscholastic Federation (CIF). However, it did not air the state basketball finals and Northern California regional basketball championships in 1999 as the CIF declined the channel's proposition to waive the broadcast rights fee; KRON/BayTV management asked for the waiver, citing revenue losses incurred by the fee it paid for the 1998 finals, though the CIF stated that BayTV rescinded the telecast rights due to the conference's delays in getting a waiver from primary rightsholder Fox Sports West 2 (now Prime Ticket) to allow BayTV to produce and televise the games. The channel also aired college basketball games involving the California Golden Bears and Stanford Cardinal that were not covered by Fox Sports Net's contract with the Pacific-10 Conference.
