= 1882 California lieutenant gubernatorial election =

- November 7, 1882
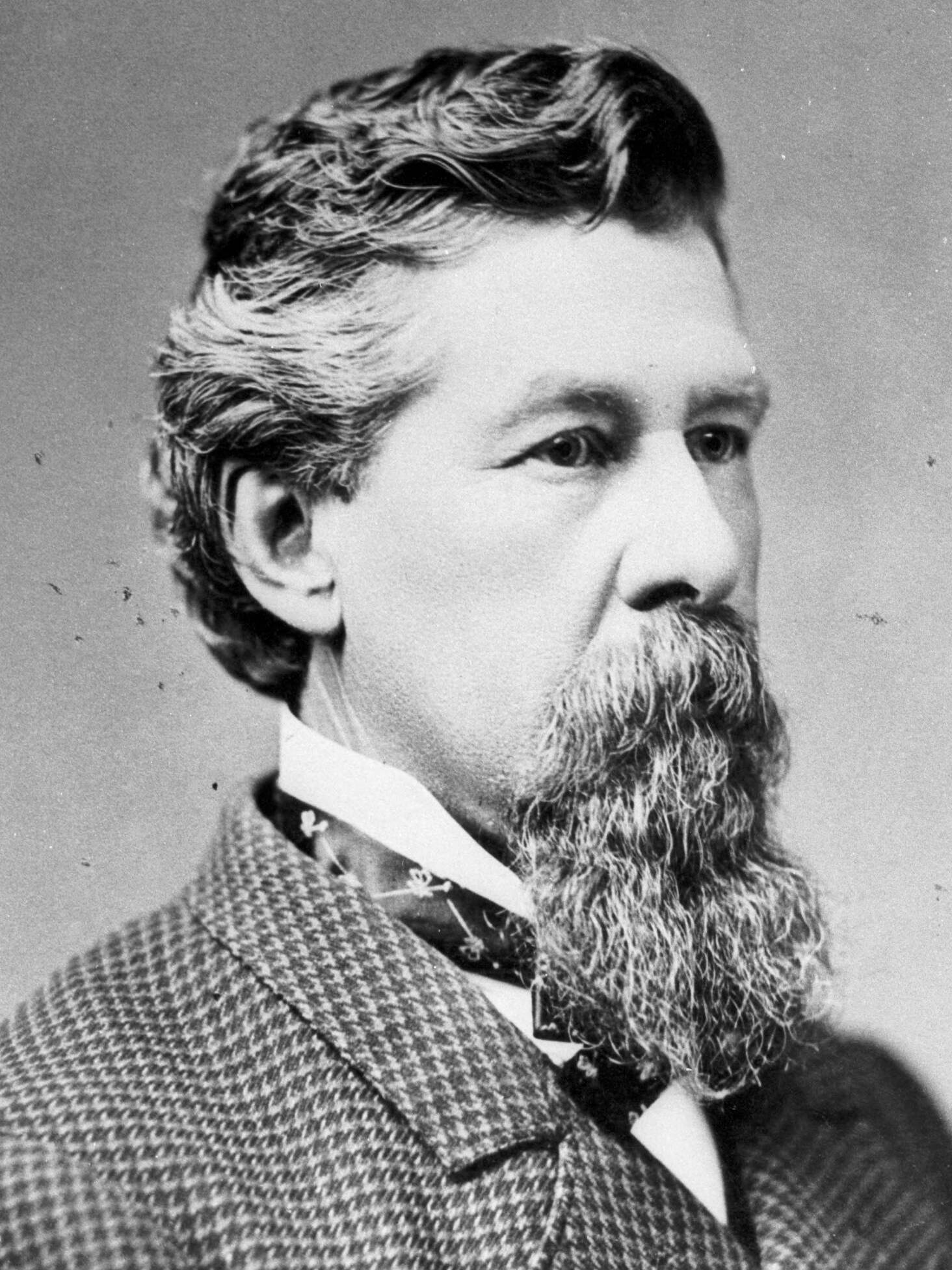

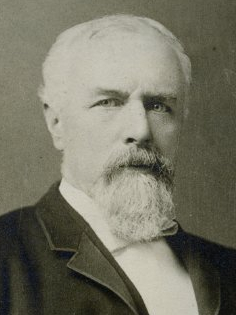
Nominee	John Daggett	Alvah R. Conklin
Party	Democratic	Republican
Popular vote	87,944	71,640
Percentage	53.46%	43.55%
- County results Daggett: 40–50% 50–60% 60–70% Conklin: 40–50% 50–60% 60–70%
Lieutenant Governor before election
John Mansfield
Republican
Elected Lieutenant Governor
John Daggett
Democratic

The 1882 California lieutenant gubernatorial election was held on November 7, 1882, in order to elect the lieutenant governor of California. Democratic nominee John Daggett defeated Republican nominee Alvah R. Conklin, Prohibition nominee William Sims and Greenback nominee William J. Sweasy.

== General election ==
On election day, November 7, 1882, Democratic nominee John Daggett won the election by a margin of 16,304 votes against his foremost opponent Republican nominee Alvah R. Conklin, thereby gaining Democratic control over the office of lieutenant governor. Mansfield was sworn in as the 16th lieutenant governor of California on January 3, 1883.

=== Results ===
California lieutenant gubernatorial election, 1882
Party	Candidate	Votes	%
Democratic	John Daggett	87,944	53.46
Republican	Alvah R. Conklin	71,640	43.55
Prohibition	William Sims	3,783	2.30
Greenback	William J. Sweasy	1,138	0.69
Total votes		164,505	100.00
Democratic gain from Republican			
