= 1895 United States Senate special election in California =

- January 23, 1895

Majority vote of each house needed to win
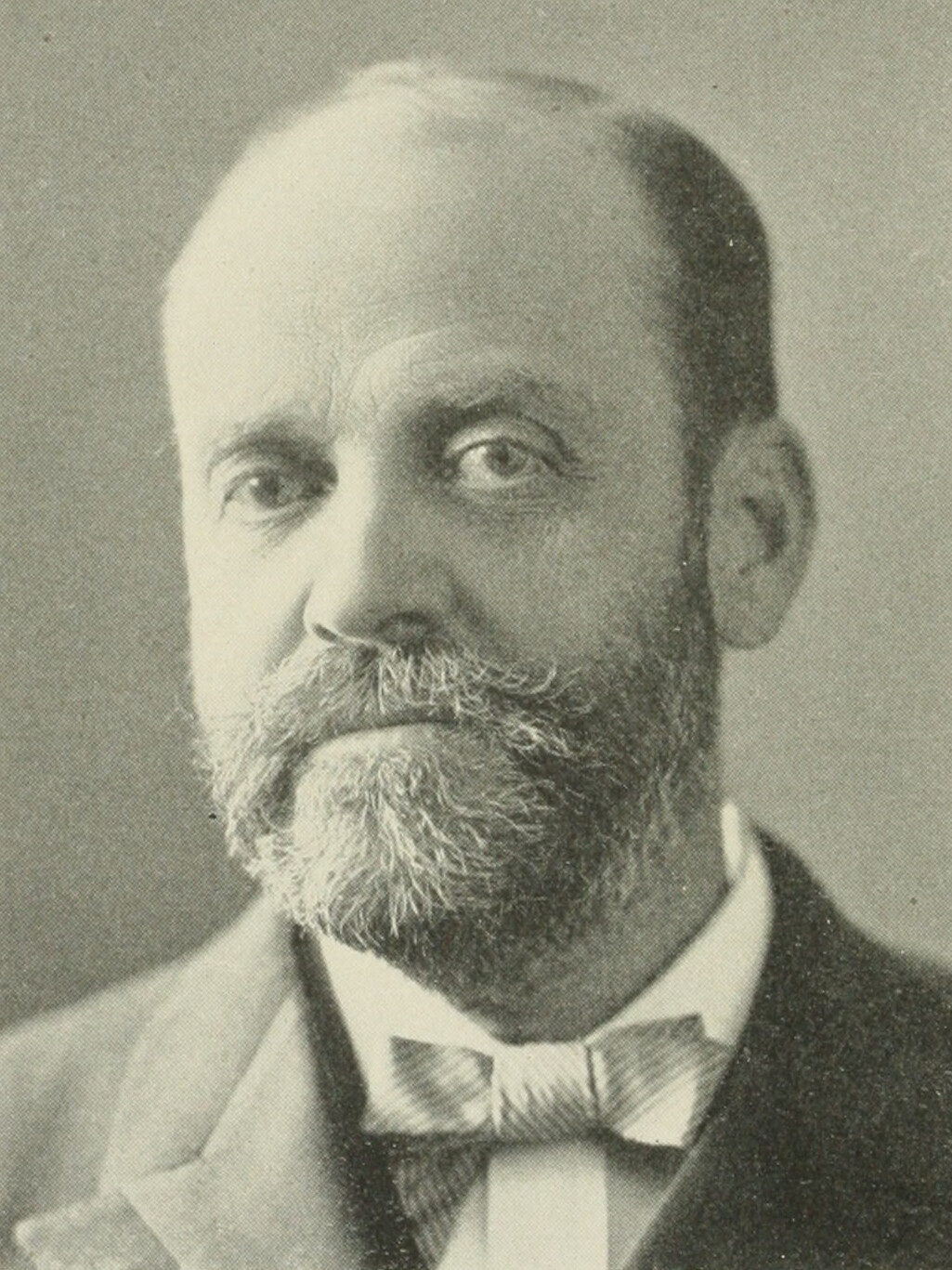

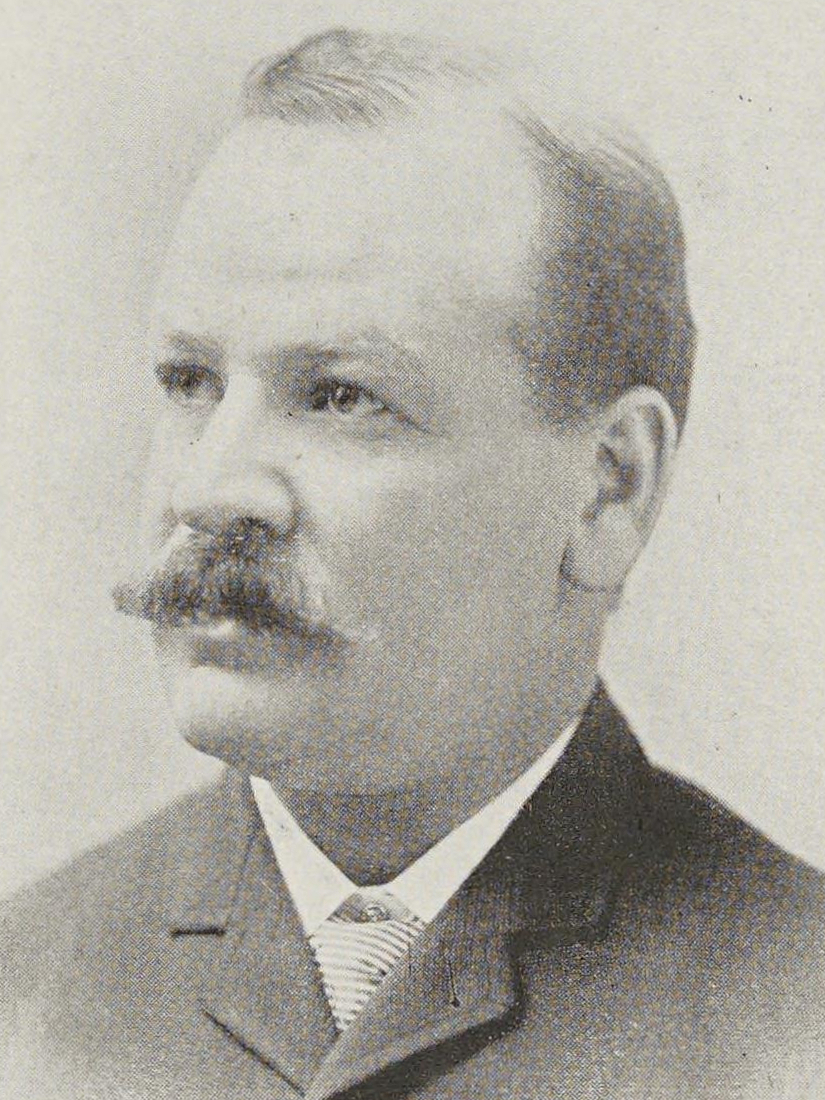

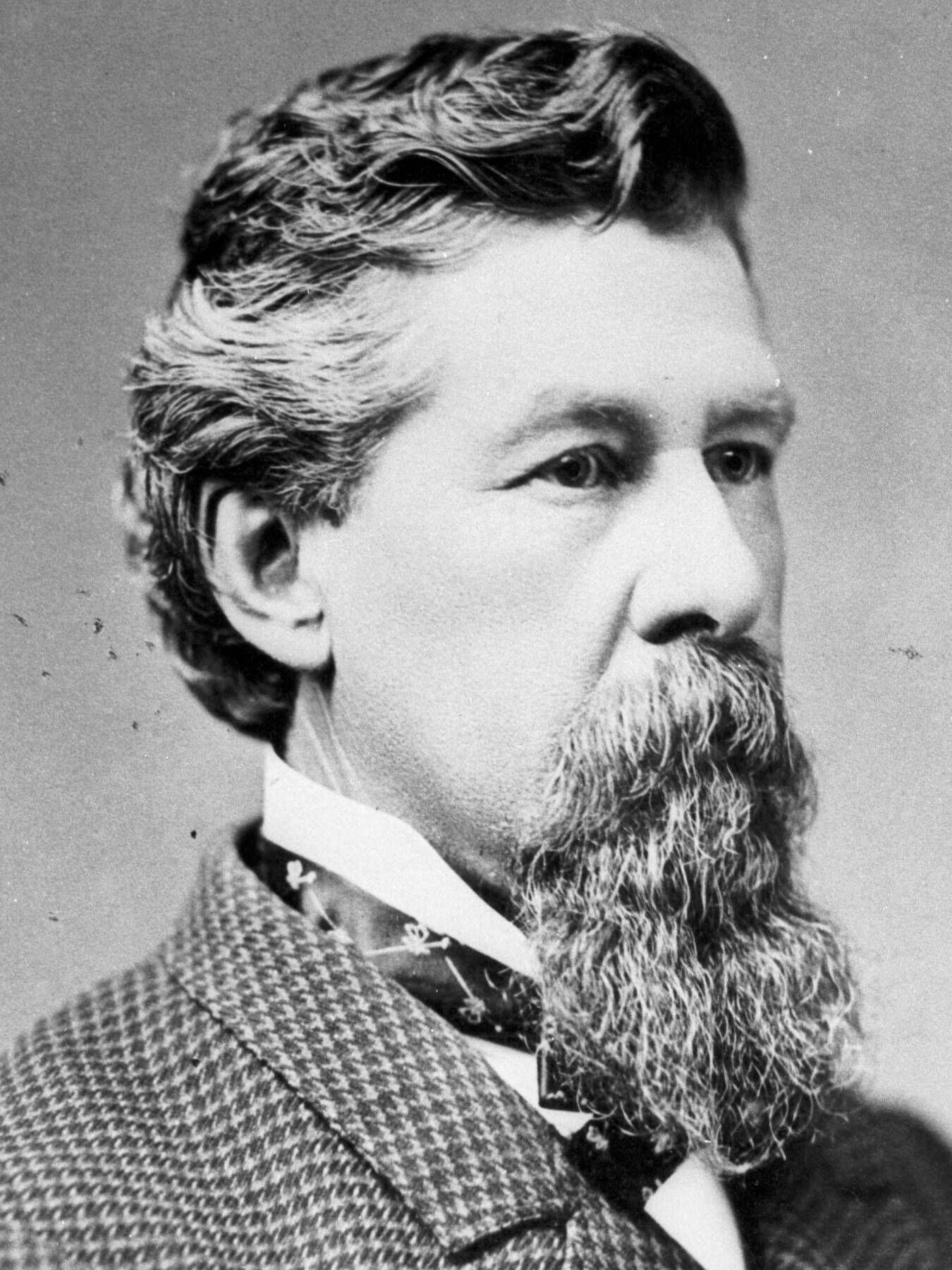

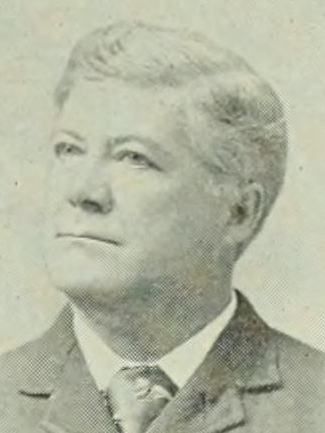

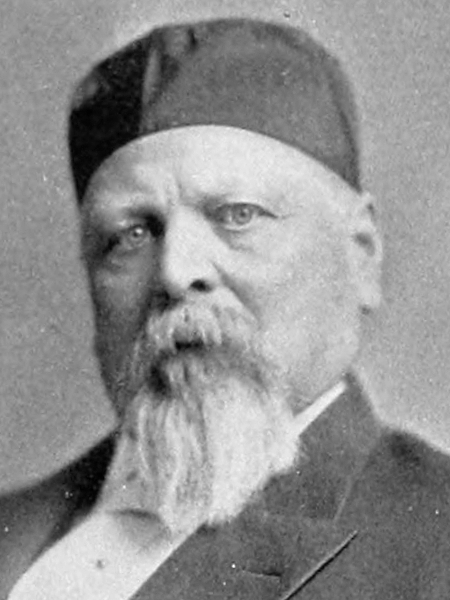

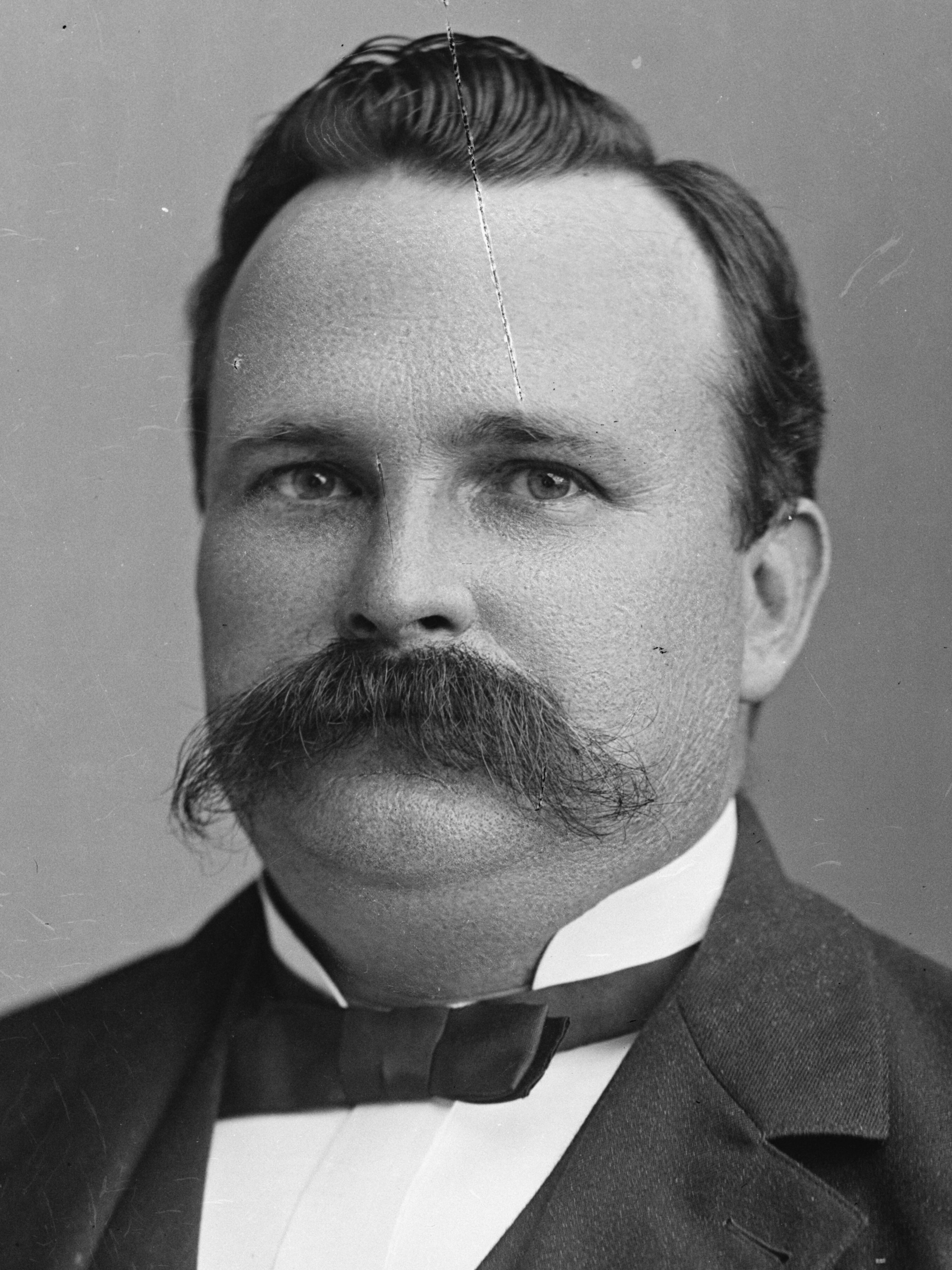
Nominee	George C. Perkins	M. H. de Young	John Daggett
Party	Republican	Republican	Democratic
Senate	20	4	5
Percentage	50.00%	10.00%	12.50%
House	42	12	7
Percentage	54.55%	15.58%	9.09%
Nominee	William W. Foote	Jacob H. Neff	James G. Maguire
Party	Democratic	Republican	Democratic
Senate	2	0	2
Percentage	5.00%	0.00%	5.00%
House	7	5	0
Percentage	9.09%	6.49%	0.00%
Senator before election
George C. Perkins
Republican
Elected Senator
George C. Perkins
Republican

The 1895 United States Senate special election in California was held on January 23, 1895, by the California State Legislature to elect a U.S. senator (Class 3) to represent the State of California in the United States Senate. Incumbent Republican Senator George Clement Perkins, who was appointed by Governor Henry Markham to fill the vacancy caused by the death of Senator Leland Stanford in 1893, was re-elected to a full term in office, defeating newspaper publisher and fellow Republican M. H. de Young, Democratic former Lieutenant Governor John Daggett, and several other minor challengers.

== Results ==
Election in the Senate
Party	Candidate	Votes	%
Republican	George C. Perkins (incumbent)	20	50.00%
Democratic	John Daggett	5	12.50%
Republican	M. H. de Young	4	10.00%
Democratic	William W. Foote	2	5.00%
Democratic	James G. Maguire	2	5.00%
	Scattering	7	17.50%
Total votes		40	100.00%

Election in the Assembly
Party	Candidate	Votes	%
Republican	George C. Perkins (incumbent)	42	54.55%
Republican	M. H. de Young	12	15.58%
Democratic	John Daggett	7	9.09%
Democratic	William W. Foote	7	9.09%
Republican	Jacob H. Neff	5	6.49%
	Scattering	4	5.19%
Total votes		77	100.00%
