= San Francisco Chronicle =

American daily newspaper

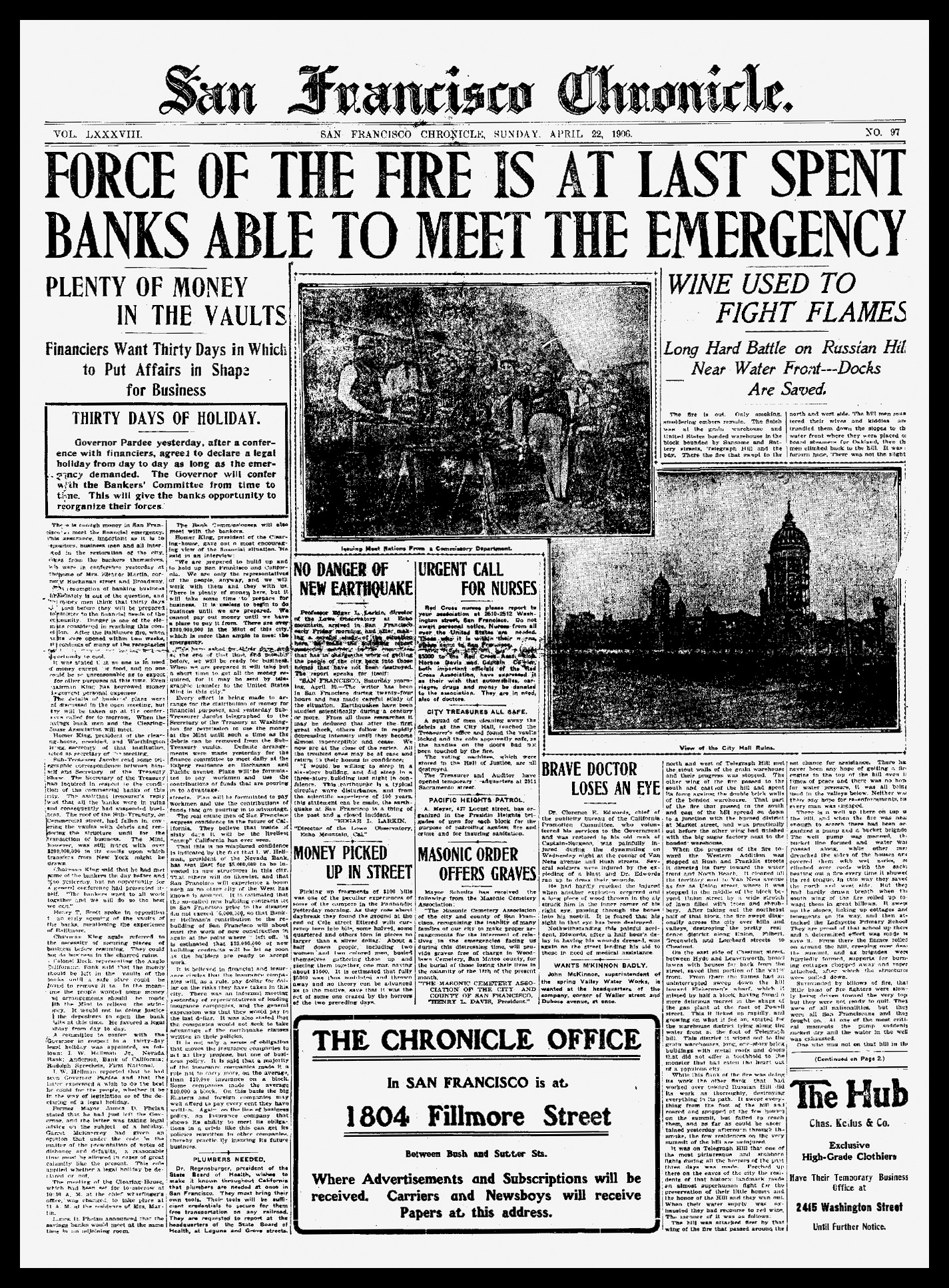
- The San Francisco Chronicle's front page, April 22, 1906
- Type: Daily newspaper
- Format: Broadsheet
- Owner: Hearst Communications
- Publisher: Bill Nagel
- Founded: From January 16, 1865 to August 31, 1868, known as The Daily Dramatic Chronicle; from September 1, 1868 to August 14, 1869, known as Daily Morning Chronicle; and from August 15, 1869, known as San Francisco Chronicle
- Headquarters: 901 Mission Street; San Francisco, California; 94103
- Circulation: 137,759 digital subscribers 29,500 Average print circulation
- ISSN: 1932-8672 (print); 2574-5921 (web)
- OCLC number: 8812614
- Website: sfchronicle.com; sfgate.com (until 2017)

The San Francisco Chronicle is a newspaper serving primarily the San Francisco Bay Area of Northern California. It was founded on January 16, 1865 as The Daily Dramatic Chronicle by teenage brothers Charles de Young and Michael H. de Young. It underwent a name change in 1868 and, for less than a year, was published as The Daily Morning Chronicle. Finally, on August 15, 1869, the newspaper was published under its current name and assumed a daily publication frequency starting with the September 9, 1872, issue.

The paper benefited from the growth of San Francisco and had the largest newspaper circulation on the West Coast of the United States by 1880. Like other newspapers, it experienced a rapid fall in circulation in the early 21st century and was ranked 18th nationally by circulation in the first quarter of 2021.

In 1994, the newspaper launched the SFGate website, with a soft launch in March and an official launch on November 3, 1994, including both content from the newspaper and other sources. "The Gate", as it was known at launch, was the first large market newspaper website in the world, co-founded by Allen Weiner and John Coate. It went on to staff up with its own columnists and reporters, and even won a Pulitzer Prize for Mark Fiore's political cartoons.

The paper is owned by the Hearst Corporation, which bought it from the de Young family in 2000. It is the only major daily paper covering the city and county of San Francisco. In 2013, the newspaper launched its own namesake website, SFChronicle.com, and began the separation of SFGate and the Chronicle brands, which today are two separately run entities.

== History ==
Portraits of "Harry" (left) and Charles de Young by George Frederick Keller published in The Wasp, November 11, 1876

The Chronicle was founded by brothers Charles and M. H. de Young in 1865 as The Daily Dramatic Chronicle, funded by a borrowed $20 gold piece. Their brother Gustavus was named with Charles on the masthead. Within 10 years, it had the largest circulation of any newspaper west of the Mississippi River. The paper's first office was in a building at the corner of Bush and Kearney Streets. The brothers then commissioned a building from Burnham and Root at 690 Market Street at the corner of Third and Kearney Streets to be their new headquarters, in what became known as Newspaper Row. The new building, San Francisco's first skyscraper, was completed in 1889. It was damaged in the 1906 earthquake, but it was rebuilt under the direction of William Polk, Burnham's associate in San Francisco. That building, known as the "Old Chronicle Building" or the "DeYoung Building", still stands and was restored in 2007. It is a historic landmark and is the location of the Ritz-Carlton Club and Residences.

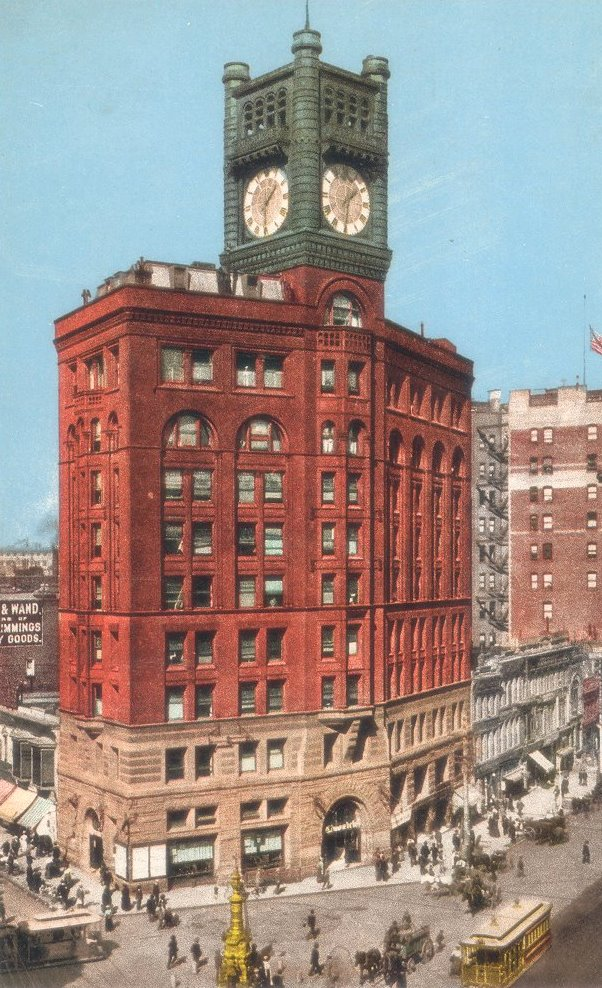
The Old Chronicle Building, at 690 Market Street

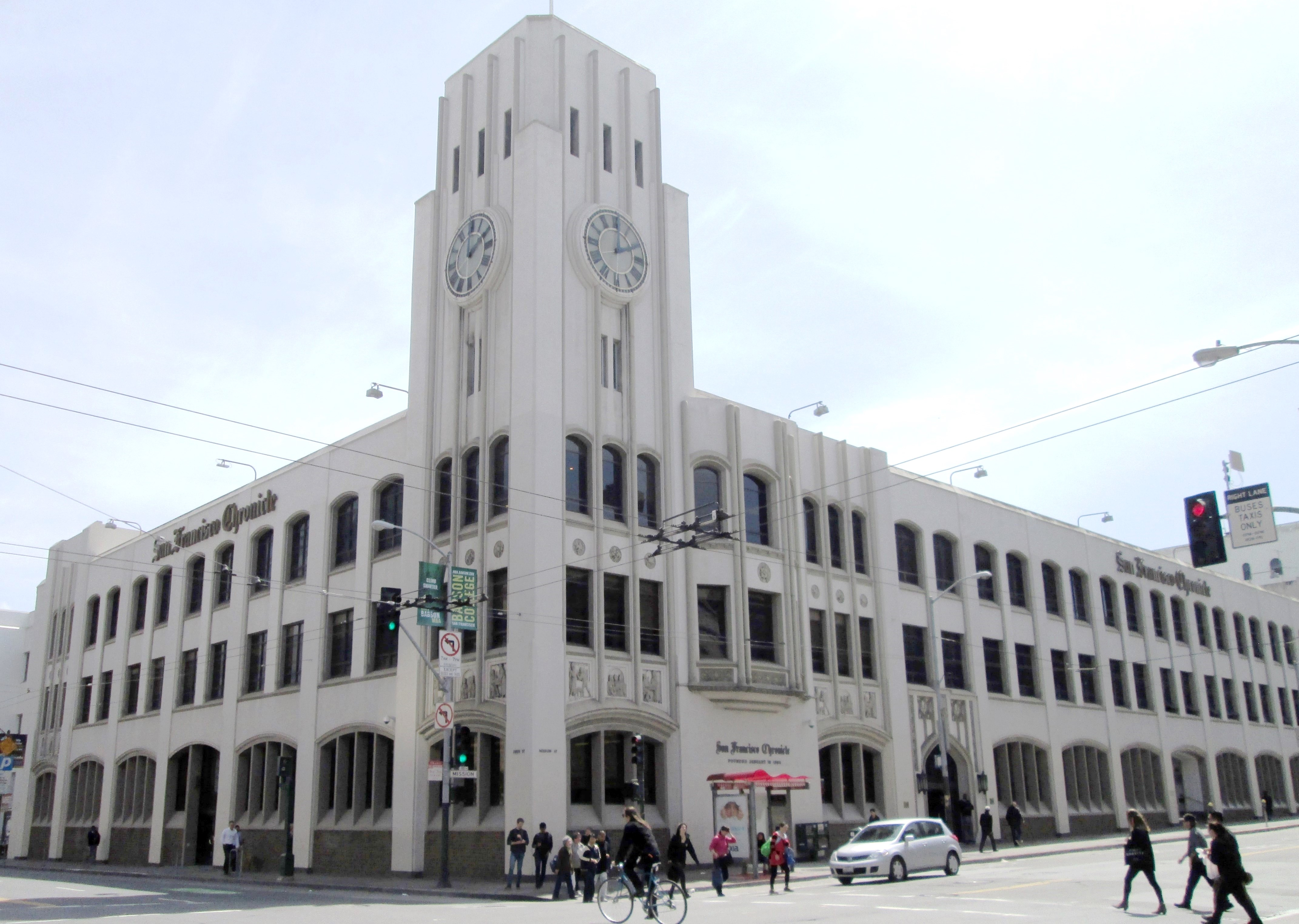
The current Chronicle Building, at 901 Mission Street, was commissioned in 1924 and is pictured here in 2017.

In 1924, the Chronicle commissioned a new headquarters at 901 Mission Street on the corner of 5th Street in what is now the South of Market (SoMa) neighborhood of San Francisco. It was designed by Charles Peter Weeks and William Peyton Day in the Gothic Revival architecture style, but most of the Gothic Revival detailing was removed in 1968 when the building was re-clad with stucco. This building remains the Chronicle's headquarters in 2017, although other concerns are located there as well.

Between World War II and 1971, new editor Scott Newhall took a bold and somewhat provocative approach to news presentation. Newhall's Chronicle included investigative reporting by such journalists as Pierre Salinger, who later played a prominent role in national politics, and Paul Avery, the staffer who pursued the trail of the self-named "Zodiac Killer", who sent a cryptogram in three sections in letters to the Chronicle and two other papers during his murder spree in the late 1960s. It also featured such colorful columnists as Pauline Phillips, who wrote under the name "Dear Abby", "Count Marco" (Marc Spinelli), Stanton Delaplane, Terence O'Flaherty, Lucius Beebe, Art Hoppe, Charles McCabe, and Herb Caen.

The newspaper grew in circulation to become the city's largest, overtaking the rival San Francisco Examiner. The demise of other San Francisco dailies through the late 1950s and early 1960s left the Examiner and the Chronicle to battle for circulation and readership superiority.

=== Joint operating agreement ===
The competition between the Chronicle and Examiner took a financial toll on both papers until the summer of 1965, when a merger of sorts created a Joint Operating Agreement under which the Chronicle became the city's sole morning daily while the Examiner changed to afternoon publication (which ultimately led to a declining readership).

The newspapers were officially owned by the San Francisco Newspaper Agency, which managed sales and distribution for both newspapers and was charged with ensuring that one newspaper's circulation did not grow at the expense of the other. Revenue was split equally, which led to a situation widely understood to benefit the Examiner, since the Chronicle, which had a circulation four times larger than its rival, subsidized the afternoon newspaper.

The two newspapers produced a joint Sunday edition, with the Examiner publishing the news sections and the Sunday magazine, and the Chronicle responsible for the tabloid-sized entertainment section and the book review. From 1965 on the two papers shared a single classified-advertising operation. This arrangement stayed in place until the Hearst Corporation took full control of the Chronicle in 2000.

=== Push into the suburbs ===
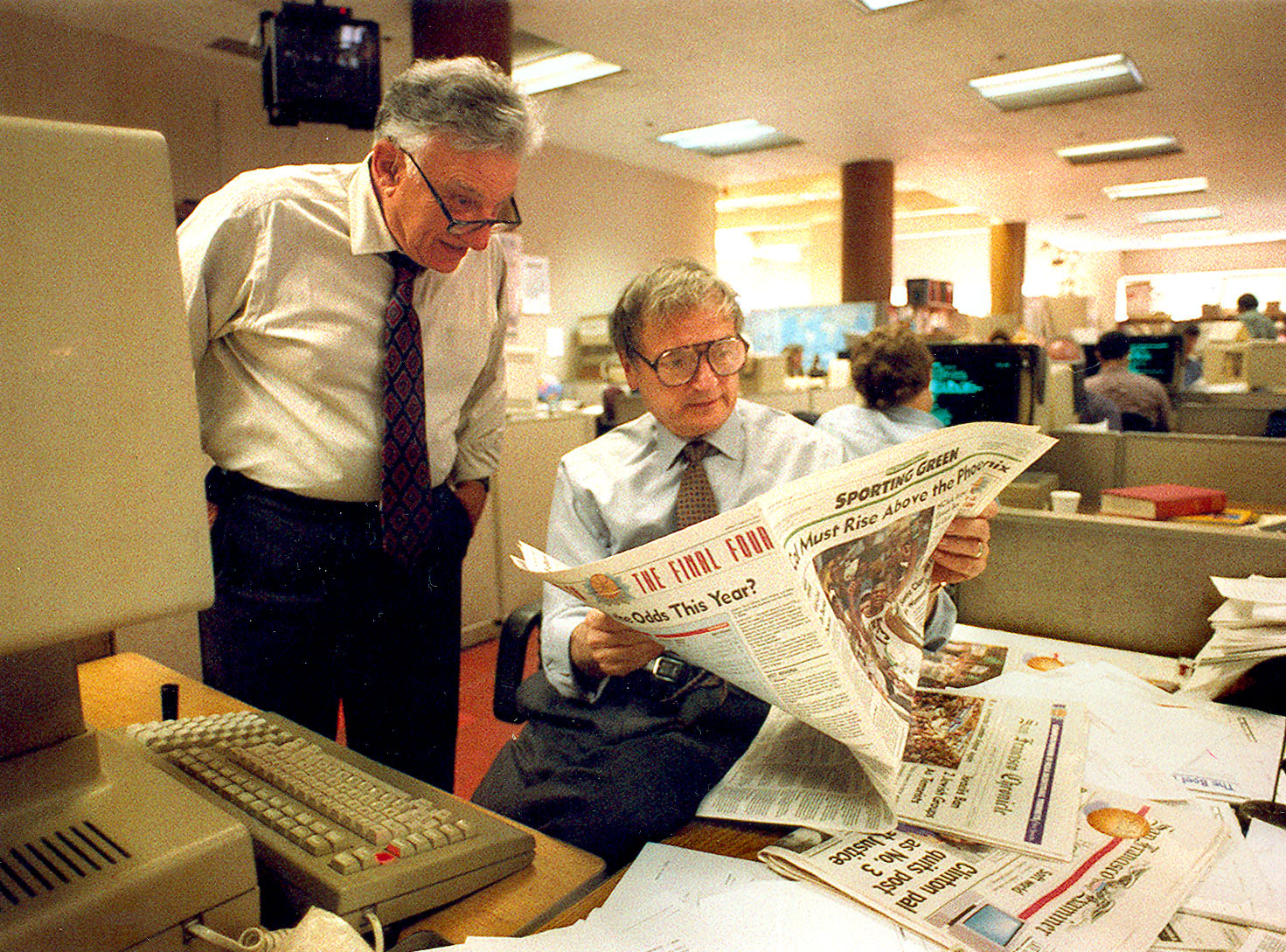
Bill German (left), the Chronicle's editor emeritus, and Page One editor Jack Breibart in the newsroom, March 1994

Beginning in the early 1990s, the Chronicle began to face competition beyond the borders of San Francisco. The newspaper had long enjoyed a wide reach as the de facto "newspaper of record" in Northern California, with distribution along the Central Coast, the Central Valley, and even as far as Honolulu, Hawaii. There was little competition in the Bay Area suburbs and other areas that the newspaper served, but as Knight-Ridder consolidated the Mercury News in 1975; purchased the Contra Costa Times (now East Bay Times) in 1995; and as the Denver-based Media News Group made a rapid purchase of the remaining newspapers on the East Bay by 1985, the Chronicle realized it had to step up its suburban coverage.

The Chronicle launched five zoned sections to appear in the Friday edition of the paper. The sections covered San Francisco and four different suburban areas. They each featured a unique columnist, enterprise pieces, and local news specific to the community. The newspaper added 40 full-time staff positions to work in the suburban bureaus. Despite the push to focus on suburban coverage, the Chronicle was hamstrung by the Sunday edition, which, being produced by the San Francisco-centric "un-Chronicle" Examiner, had none of the focus on the suburban communities that the Chronicle was striving to cultivate.

=== Sale to Hearst ===
The de Young family controlled the paper, via the Chronicle Publishing Company, until July 27, 2000, when it was sold to Hearst Communications, Inc. for $660 million, considerably above analysts' $500 million valuation of the paper. Hearst owned the Examiner, and following its purchase of the Chronicle the Hearst Corporation transferred the Examiner to the Fang family, publisher of the San Francisco Independent and AsianWeek, along with a $66-million subsidy. Under the new owners, the Examiner became a free tabloid, leaving the Chronicle as the only daily broadsheet newspaper in San Francisco.

In 1949, the de Young family founded KRON-TV (Channel 4), the Bay Area's third television station. Until the mid-1960s, the station (along with KRON-FM), operated from the basement of the Chronicle Building, on Mission Street. KRON moved to studios at 1001 Van Ness Avenue (on the former site of St. Mary's Cathedral, which burned down in 1962). KRON was sold to Young Broadcasting in 2000 and, after years of being San Francisco's NBC affiliate, became an independent station on January 1, 2002, when NBC—tired of Chronicle's repeated refusal to sell KRON to the network and, later, Young's asking price for the station being too high—purchased KNTV in San Jose from Granite Broadcasting Corporation for $230 million.

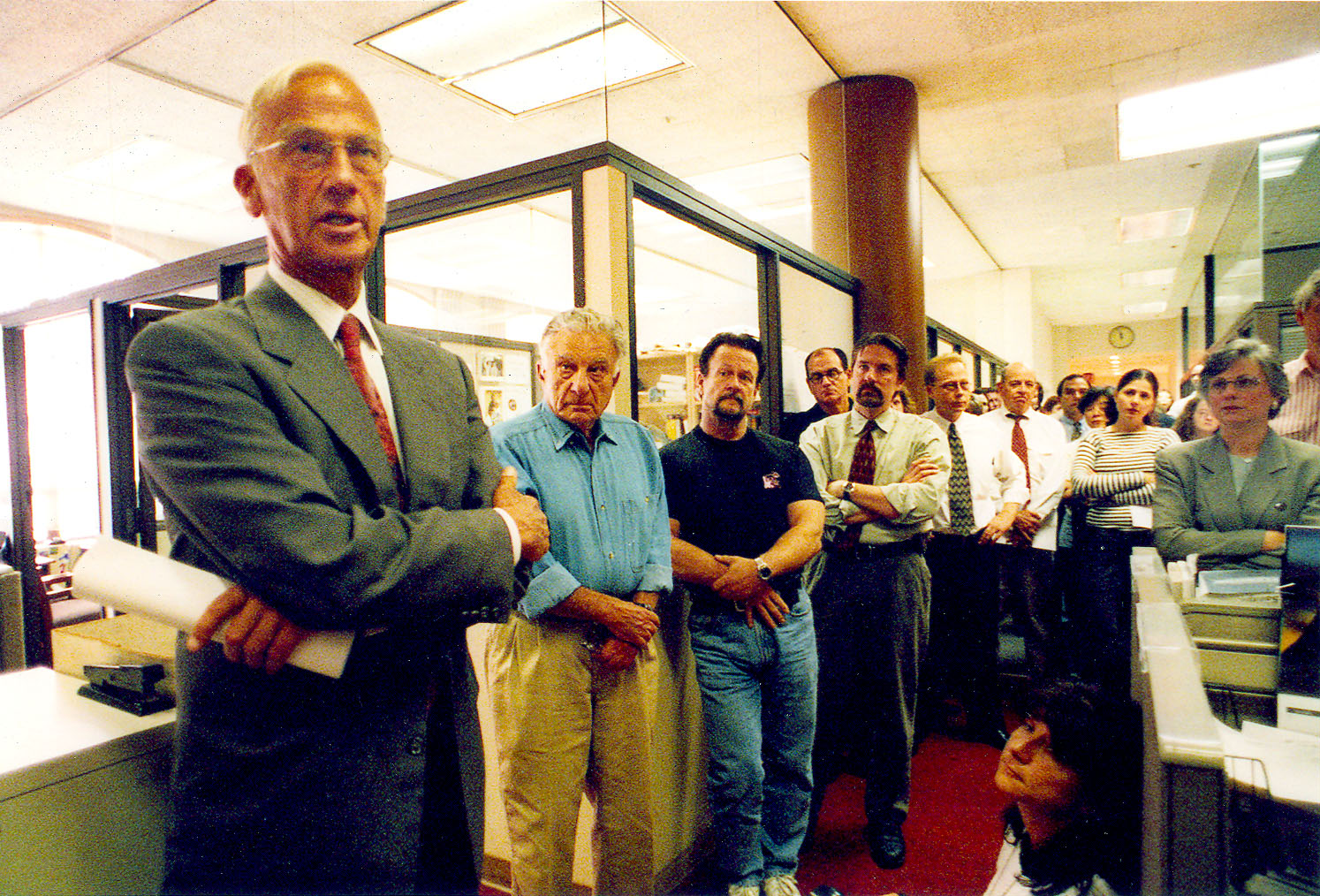
Chronicle CEO John Sias announces the sale of the newspaper to the Hearst Corporation, August 6, 1999.

Since the Hearst Corporation took ownership in 2000 the Chronicle has made periodic changes to its organization and design, but on February 1, 2009, as the newspaper began its 145th year of publication, the Chronicle Sunday edition introduced a redesigned paper featuring a modified logo, new section, and page organization, new features, bolder, colored section-front banners and new headline and text typography. The frequent bold-faced, all-capital-letter headlines typical of the Chronicle's front page were eliminated. Editor Ward Bushee's note heralded the issue as the start of a "new era" for the Chronicle.

On July 6, 2009, the paper unveiled some alterations to the new design that included yet newer section fronts and wider use of color photographs and graphics. In a special section publisher, Frank J. Vega described new, state-of-the-art printing operations enabling the production of what he termed "A Bolder, Brighter Chronicle." The newer look was accompanied by a reduction in the size of the broadsheet. Such moves are similar to those made by other prominent American newspapers such as the Chicago Tribune and Orlando Sentinel, which in 2008 unveiled radically new designs even as changing reader demographics and general economic conditions necessitated physical reductions of the newspapers.

On November 9, 2009, the Chronicle became the first newspaper in the nation to print on high-quality glossy paper. The high-gloss paper is used for some section fronts and inside pages.

== Staff and features ==
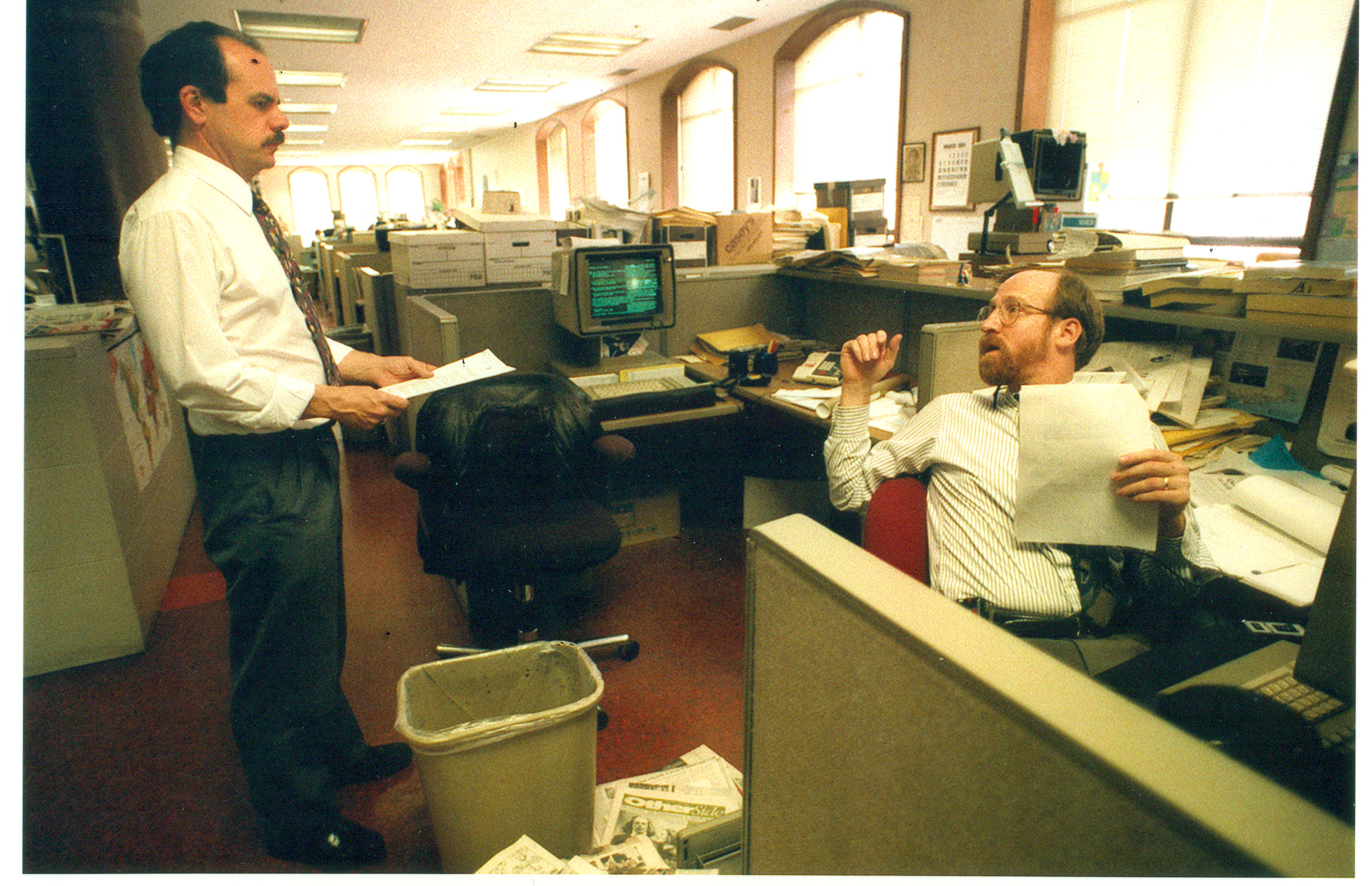
"Chronicle Insider" columnists Phil Matier and Andrew Ross in the newsroom (1994)

The current publisher of the Chronicle is Bill Nagel. Audrey Cooper was named editor-in-chief in January 2015 and was the first woman to hold the position. In June 2020 she left to be the editor-in-chief of WNYC, New York City. In August 2020, Hearst named Emilio Garcia-Ruiz the publication's editor-in-chief. Ann Killion has written for Sports Illustrated. Carl Nolte is a journalist and columnist.

The Chronicle's sports section is edited by Christina Kahrl and called Sporting Green as it is printed on green-tinted pages. The section's best-known writers are its columnists: Bruce Jenkins, Ann Killion, Scott Ostler, and Mike Silver. Its baseball coverage is anchored by Henry Schulman, John Shea, and Susan Slusser, the first female president of the Baseball Writers' Association of America (BBWAA).

The Chronicle's Sunday arts and entertainment insert section is called Datebook, and has for decades been printed on pink-tinted paper in a tabloid format. Movie reviews (for many years written by nationally known critic Mick LaSalle) feature a unique rating system: instead of stars or a "thumbs up" system, the Chronicle has for decades used a small cartoon icon, sitting in a movie theater seat, known as the "Little Man", explained in 2008 by the Chicago Sun-Times film critic Roger Ebert: "...the only rating system that makes any sense is the Little Man of the San Francisco Chronicle, who is seen (1) jumping out of his seat and applauding wildly; (2) sitting up happily and applauding; (3) sitting attentively; (4) asleep in his seat; or (5) gone from his seat."

== Web ==
The newspaper's websites were at SFGate.com (free) and SFChronicle.com (premium). Originally The Gate, SFGATE was one of the earliest major market newspaper websites to be launched, on November 3, 1994, at the time of The Newspaper Guild strike; the union published its own news website, San Francisco Free Press, whose staff joined SFGATE when the strike ended. SFChronicle.com launched in 2013 and since 2019 has been run separately from SFGATE, whose staff are independent of the print newspaper. As of 2020 across all platforms the Chronicle has 34 million unique visitors each month, with SFGATE receiving 135.9 million pageviews and 25.1 million unique visitors per month and SFChronicle.com 31.3 million pageviews and 31.3 million unique visitors per month globally.

== Honors ==
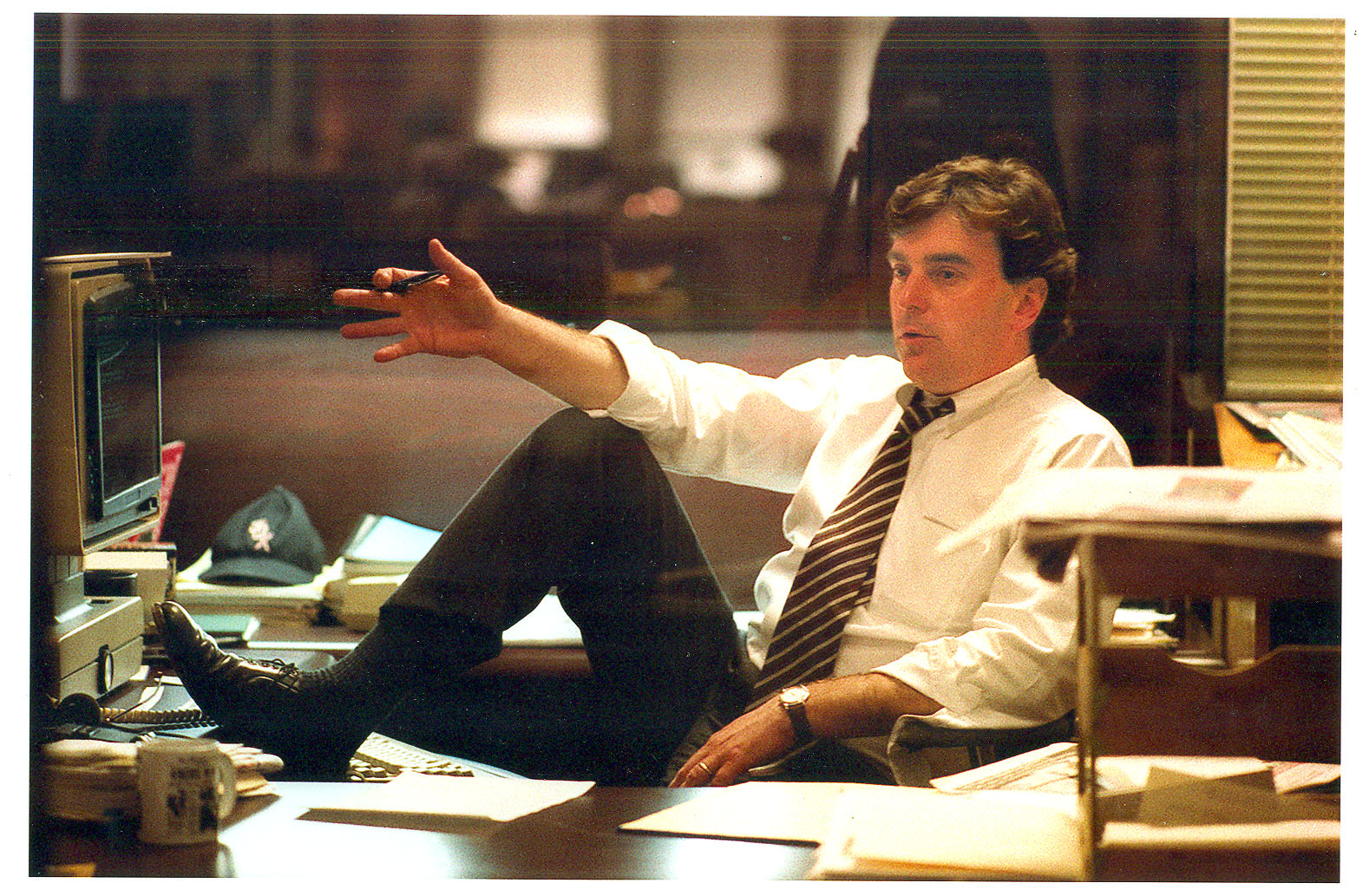
Dan Rosenheim, San Francisco Chronicle City Editor in his office (1994)

The paper has received the Pulitzer Prize on a number of occasions. Lance Williams and Mark Fainaru-Wada received the 2004 George Polk Award for Sports Reporting. Fainaru-Wada and Williams were recognized for their work on uncovering the BALCO scandal, which linked San Francisco Giants star Barry Bonds to performance-enhancing drugs.

== Challenges ==
Circulation has fallen sharply since the dot-com boom peaked from around 1997 to 2001. The Chronicle's daily readership dropped by 16.6% between 2004 and 2005 to 400,906; The Chronicle fired one-quarter of its newsroom staff in a cost-cutting move in May 2007. Newspaper executives pointed to growth of SFGate, the online website with 5.2 million unique visitors per month – fifth among U.S. newspaper websites in 2007.

In February 2009, Hearst chief executive Frank A. Bennack Jr., and Hearst President Steven R. Swartz, announced that the Chronicle had lost money every year since 2001 and more than $50 million in 2008. Without major concessions from employees and other cuts, Hearst would put the papers up for sale and, if no buyer was found, shut the paper. San Francisco would have become the first major American city without a daily newspaper. The cuts were made.

Despite – or perhaps because of – the threats, the loss of readers and advertisers accelerated. On October 26, 2009, the Audit Bureau of Circulations reported that the Chronicle had suffered a 25.8% drop in circulation for the six-month period ending in September 2009, to 251,782 subscribers, the largest percentage drop in circulation of any major newspaper in the United States. Chronicle publisher Frank Vega said the drop was expected as the paper moved to earn more from higher subscription fees from fewer readers. In May 2013, Vega retired and was replaced as publisher by former Los Angeles Times publisher Jeffrey M. Johnson. SFGate, the main digital portal for the San Francisco Chronicle, registered 19 million unique visitors in January 2015, making it the seventh-ranked newspaper website in the United States.

== Publishers ==
- M. H. de Young, 1865–1925
- George T. Cameron, 1925–1955
- Charles de Young Thieriot, 1955–1977
- Richard Tobin Thieriot, 1977–1993
- John Sias, 1993–1999 (first publisher not to be a member of the de Young/Cameron/Thieriot family)
- John Oppedahl, 2000–2003
- Steven Falk, 2003–2004
- Frank Vega, 2004–2013
- Jeffrey M. Johnson, 2013–2018
- Bill Nagel, 2018–present

== See also ==
- SFGate
- KRON-TV
- Chronicle Books
- Chronicle Features
- Chronicle Publishing Company
- List of San Francisco newspapers
- San Francisco Chronicle Magazine
