= Ritz-Carlton Club and Residences =

Residential skyscraper in San Francisco, California

Old Chronicle Building Ritz-Carlton Club and Residences
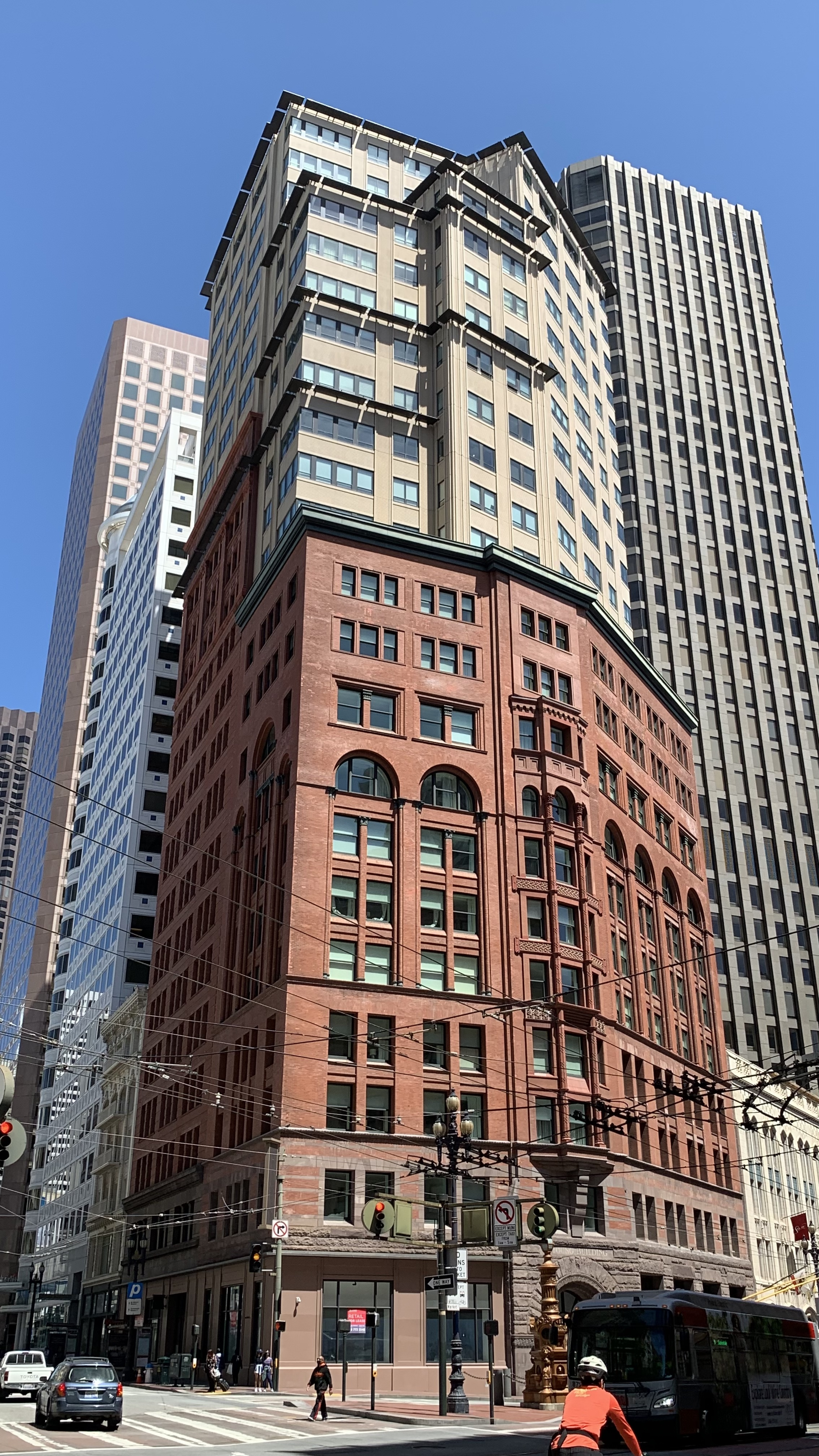
- In May 2021, with the McKesson Plaza (1 Post Street) behind in the background

- Location within San Francisco County Location within California Location within the United States
- Former names: Chronicle Building
- Alternative names: Old Chronicle Building; de Young Building

Record height
- Preceded by: Palace Hotel
- Surpassed by: Call Building

General information
- Status: Completed
- Type: Residential condominiums
- Architectural style: Richardsonian Romanesque; Modernism
- Location: 690 Market Street; San Francisco, California
- Coordinates: 37.788302°N 122.403209°W
- Construction started: 1888
- Completed: 1890
- Renovated: 1906, 1962, 2005

Height
- Roof: 312 ft (95 m)

Technical details
- Floor count: 24

Design and construction
- Architect: Burnham and Root

San Francisco Designated Landmark
- Designated: 2004
- Reference no.: 243

The Ritz-Carlton Club and Residences is a 312-foot (95 m) luxury residential skyscraper in the Financial District of San Francisco, California. The residences are built atop the historic Old Chronicle Building, sometimes called the de Young Building, which was constructed in 1890. It is the first skyscraper built in California.

== History ==
In 1888, M. H. de Young, owner of the San Francisco Chronicle, commissioned Burnham and Root to design a signature building to house his newspaper. Finished in 1890, the Chronicle Building stood ten stories, with a clock tower reaching 218 feet (66 m) in height, becoming San Francisco's first skyscraper and the tallest building on the West Coast.

In 1905, a celebration of the re-election of Mayor Eugene Schmitz stopped in front of the building and launched fireworks, which ignited the wooden clock tower atop the building. The damaged clock tower was removed and de Young added two additional floors along Market Street and a 16-story annex along Kearny Street. The Chronicle Building survived the 1906 San Francisco earthquake but was badly damaged by the ensuing fire, which gutted the interior. The building was rebuilt by architect Willis Polk, who ran the San Francisco office of Burnham and Root. In 1924, the Chronicle moved to its present location at Fifth and Mission streets, and the old Chronicle Building became a normal office building, thenceforth known as the de Young Building or Old Chronicle Building.

In 1962, in an effort to modernize the building, its owners covered the original masonry facade with a new facade of aluminum, glass, and porcelain paneling. By 2004, new owners received approval to restore the original facade, convert the building to residential use, and add eight stories to the existing structure. The Old Chronicle Building was designated San Francisco Landmark No. 243 in 2004. The building re-opened as the Ritz-Carlton Club and Residences in November 2007.

== Gallery ==
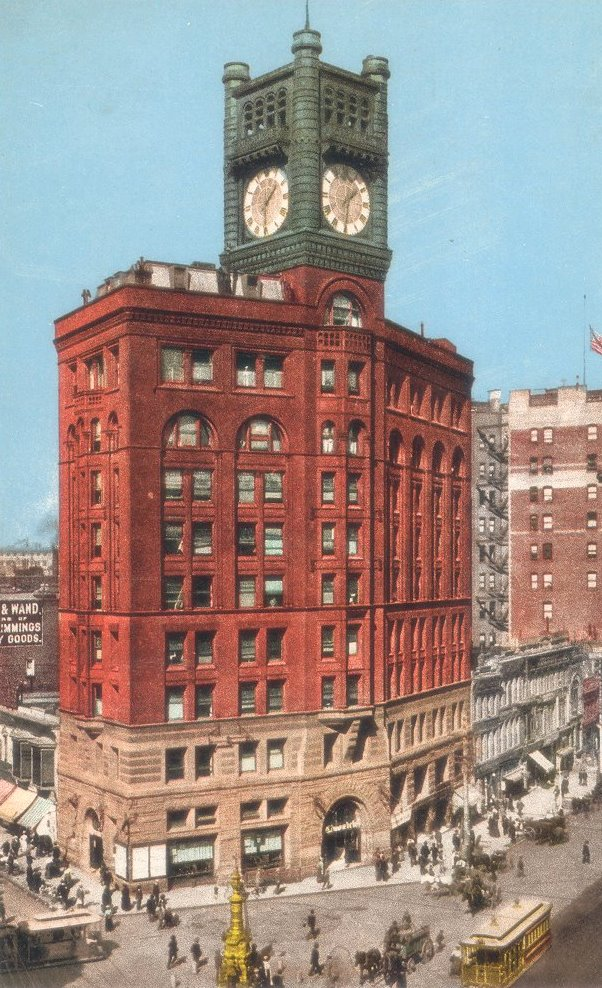
Old Chronicle Building in 1901

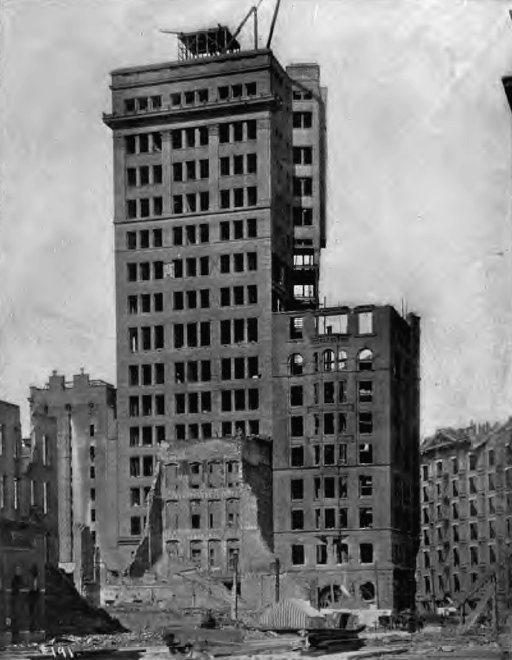
The Old Chronicle Building after the 1906 earthquake and fire

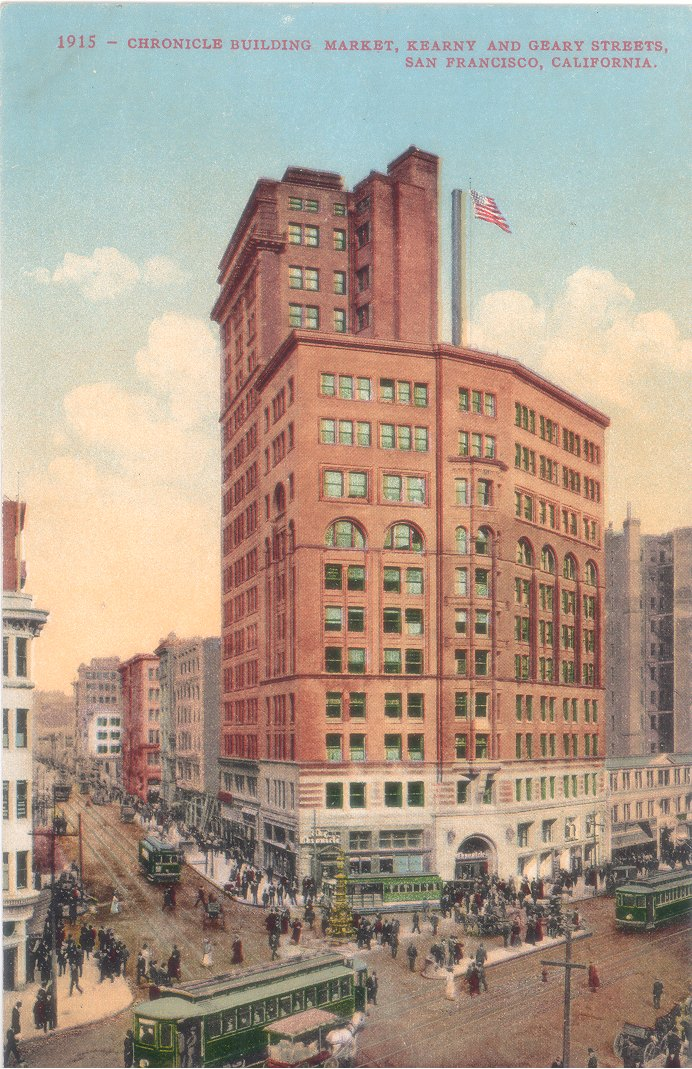
Old Chronicle Building in 1915

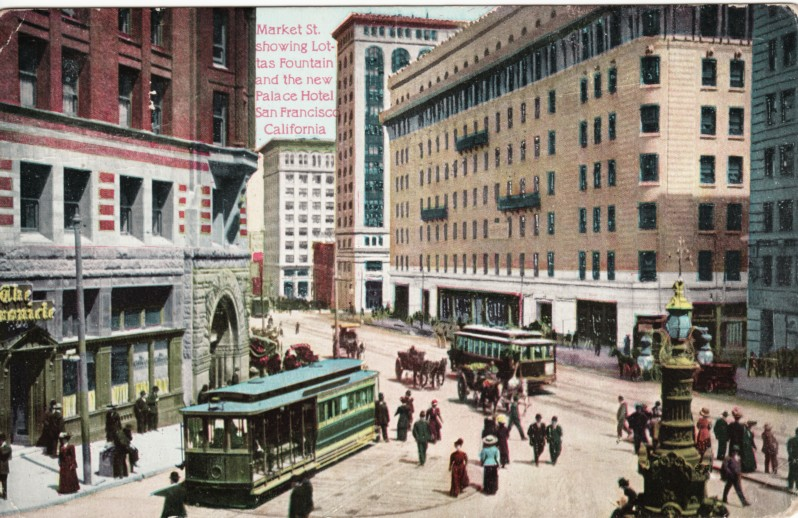
Entrance to the Old Chronicle Building (left) and the Palace Hotel, ca. 1915

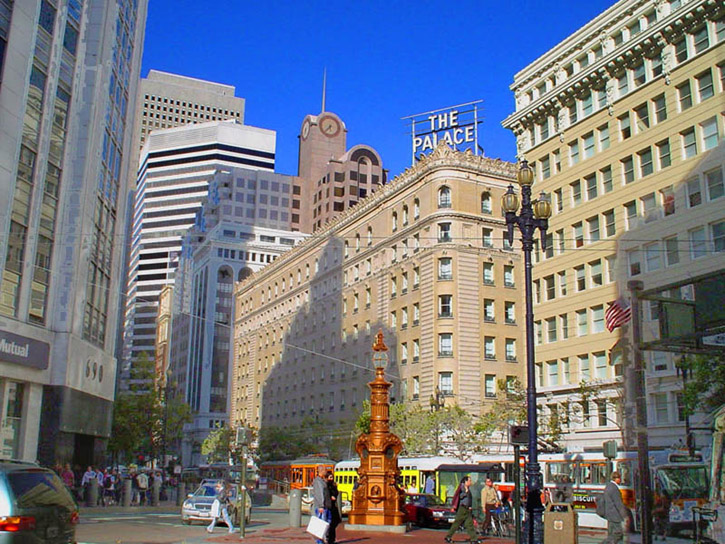
The de Young Building (left) as it appeared with its modern skin from 1962 to 2005

== See also ==
- San Francisco's tallest buildings
- List of early skyscrapers
