= Charles de Young =

American journalist and businessman

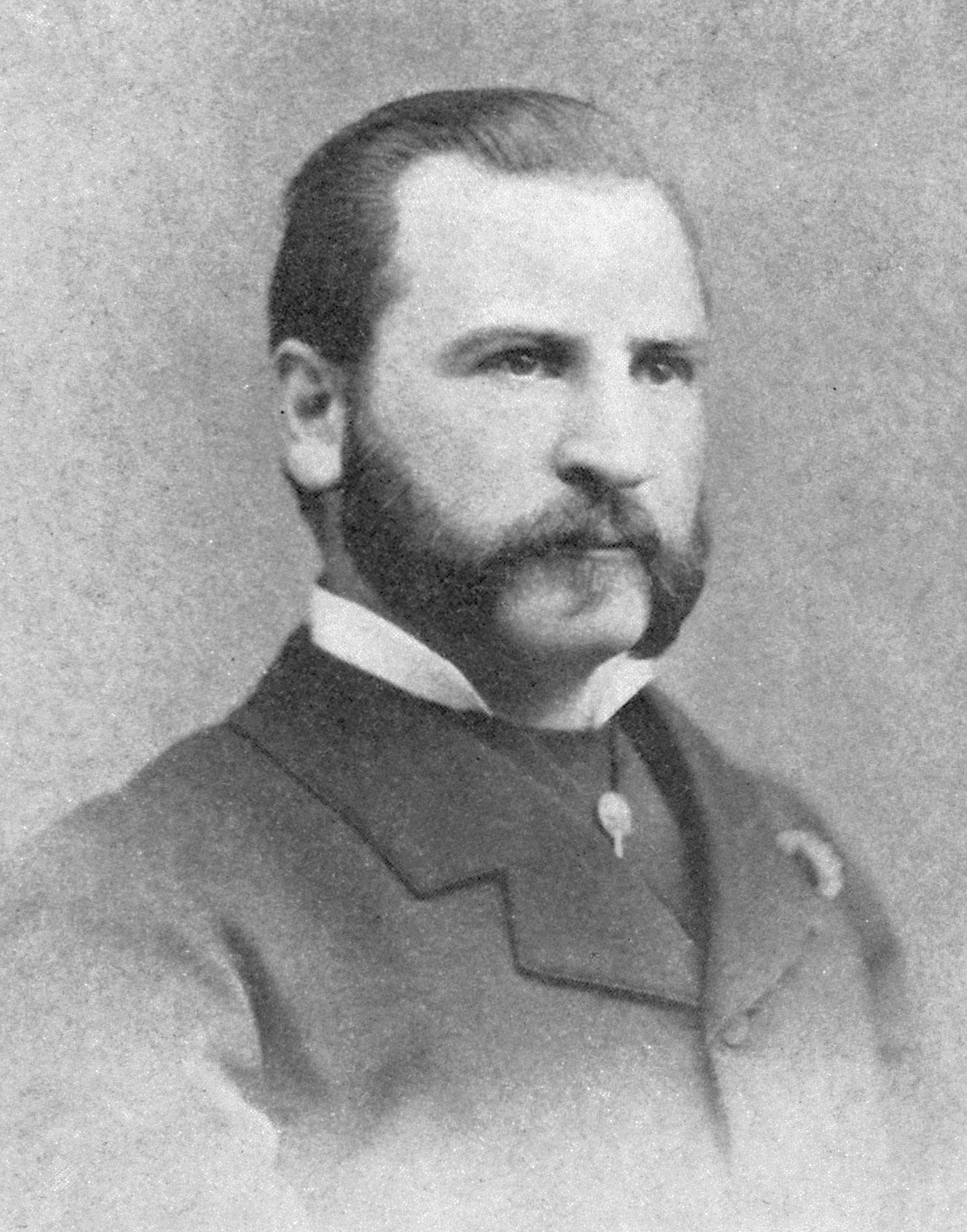
- Born: January 8, 1846; Natchitoches, Louisiana, US
- Died: April 23, 1880 (aged 34); San Francisco, California, US
- Burial place: Cypress Lawn Memorial Park
- Occupation: Newspaper publisher
- Years active: 1859–1880
- Known for: Co-founder and editor-in-chief of San Francisco Chronicle
- Relatives: M. H. de Young (brother)

Charles de Young (January 8, 1846 – April 23, 1880) was an American journalist and businessman. He, along with his younger brother M. H. de Young, founded the newspaper The Daily Dramatic Chronicle, which became the San Francisco Chronicle, and was its editor-in-chief. He was murdered by Isaac M. Kalloch, son of Isaac S. Kalloch, the Mayor of San Francisco, in revenge for a feud Charles had with the mayor.

== Early life and family ==
Charles de Young was born on January 8, 1846 in Natchitoches, Louisiana. He was the son of Cornelia "Amelia" (née Morange; 1809–1881) and Miechel de Young (died 1854), who married in 1837, and the brother of Michael Henry "Harry" de Young and Virginia de Young (died 1875). His family, who were Jewish, had immigrated from the Netherlands and France. His maternal grandfather, Benjamin Morange, who served as the French Minister to Spain under Napoleon I, moved to the United States about 1815 and helped found the B'nai Jeshurun Congregation in New York in 1825.

== Career ==
de Young c. 1876

In 1859, he began publishing the Holiday Advertiser, a daily publication, while he was finishing his apprenticeship. The interests were sold and in 1865, he began publishing the Dramatic Chronicle with his brother, Harry. The daily paper was focused on theater gossip, advertising and light news. The revenue from the Dramatic Chronicle allowed the brothers to begin publishing the San Francisco Chronicle in 1869. Charles focused on the content and editing of the paper, while Harry was responsible for the management of the paper on the business side.

In 1874, de Young denounced San Francisco Judge Delos Lake, which led to the two meeting in California Street for a duel during the busiest time of day. Judge Lake shot twice at de Young, who returned the shots; neither was hit.

He was proud of the notoriety he had obtained, and proud of the personal danger, as a legitimate element of that notoriety.

— De Young's obituary in The New York Times

At the time of his death, the San Francisco Chronicle was worth $250,000 (equivalent to $8,341,000 in 2025).

=== Murder ===
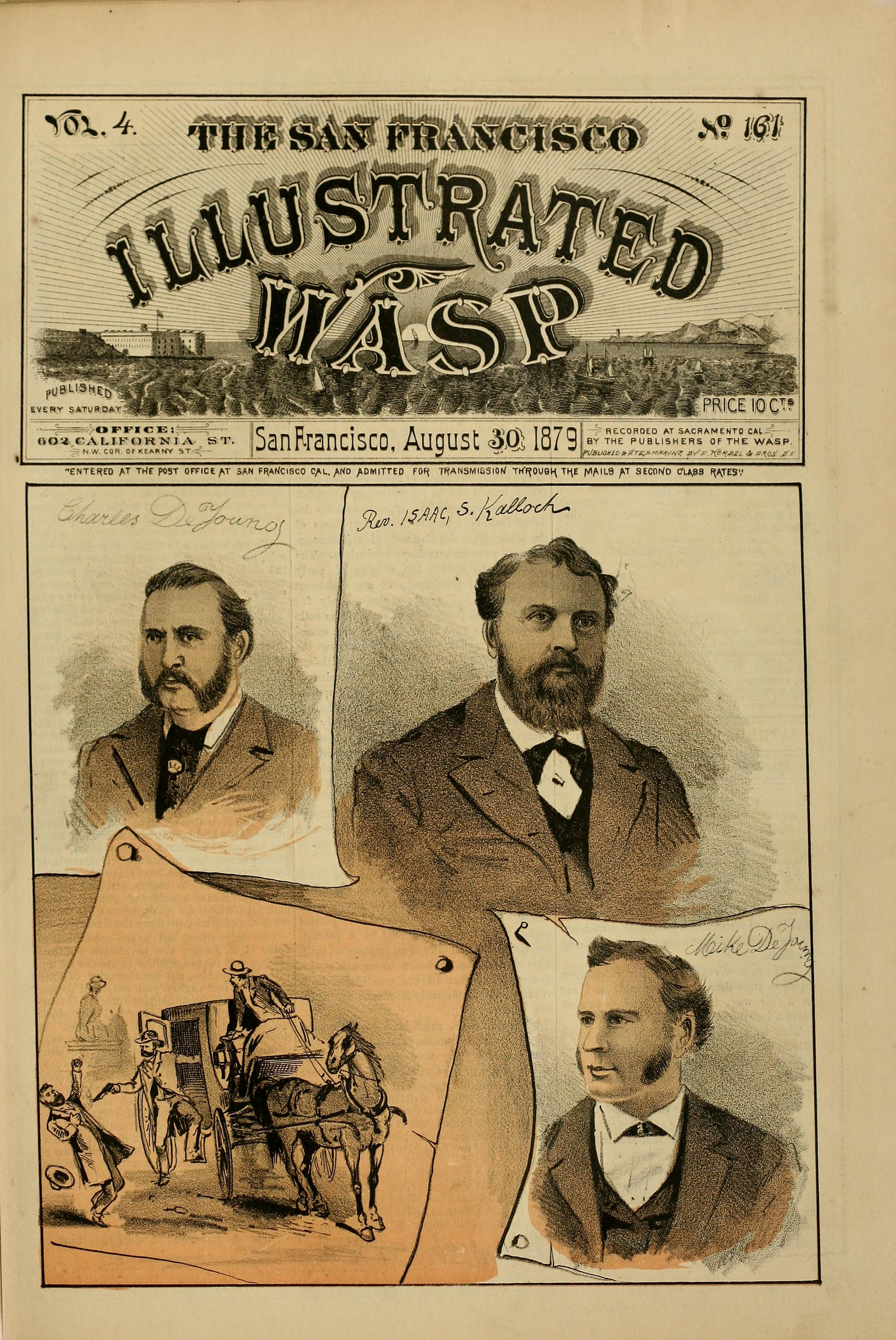
The cover of The Wasp following Kalloch's attempted assassination, August 30, 1879

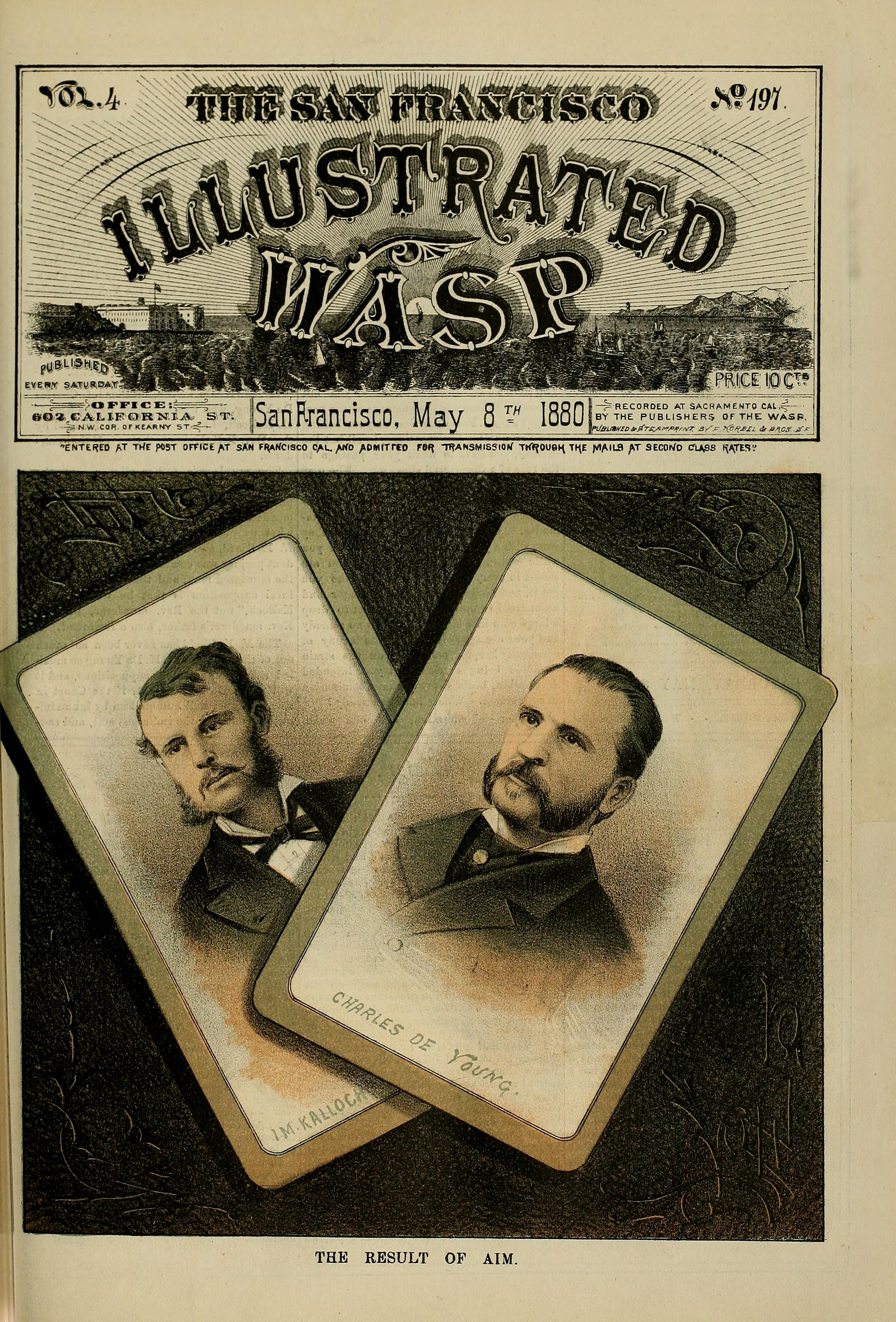
The cover of The Wasp following de Young's assassination, May 8, 1880

In 1879, Isaac Smith Kalloch ran for mayor of San Francisco. It was not long before he came under attack from the San Francisco Chronicle's editor-in-chief, Charles de Young, who was backing another candidate. de Young, with the hopes of taking Kalloch out of the mayoral race, accused the minister of having an affair. Kalloch responded by accusing Charles' mother, Amelia, of running a brothel. In response, Charles de Young ambushed Kalloch in the streets of San Francisco and shot him twice. Kalloch survived the wounds and with the sympathy of voters was elected the 18th Mayor of San Francisco. He served from 1879 until 1881. On April 23, 1880, Kalloch's son, Isaac Milton Kalloch, entered the Chronicle building and shot and killed Charles de Young.

De Young was buried at Cypress Lawn Memorial Park in Colma.

== Memorial ==
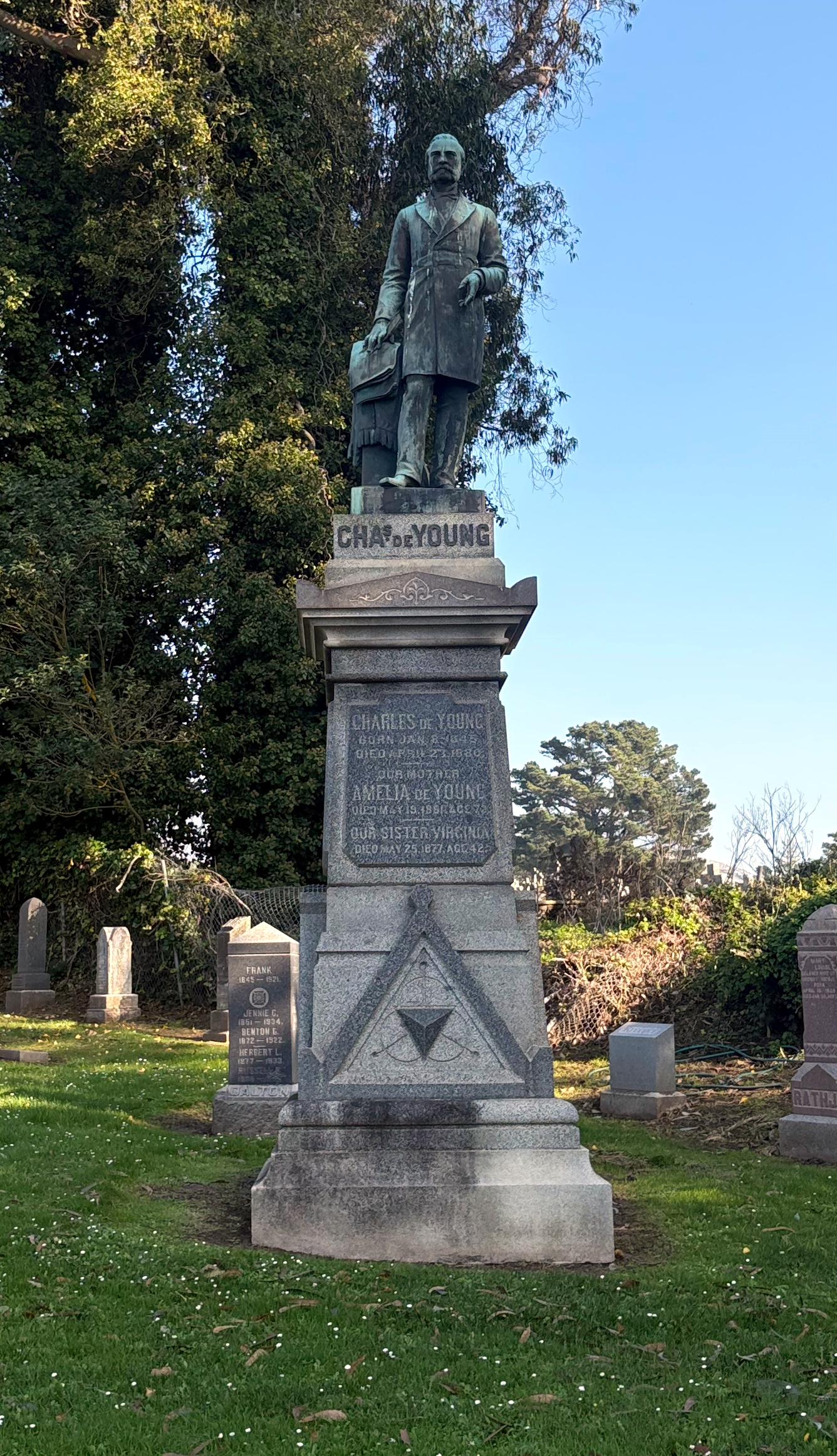
De Young's grave at Cypress Lawn Memorial Park

In 1884, de Young's brother, Harry, commissioned a bronze statue of Charles, erected at the Odd Fellows Cemetery in San Francisco which cost in excess of $10,000 (equivalent to $358,333 in 2025). [Needs Citation] The statue was sculpted by F. Marion Wells, a member of the Bohemian Club in San Francisco.
