= Young Broadcasting =

American media company

Young Broadcasting, LLC
- Company type: Private
- Traded as: Nasdaq: YBTVA (Until 2009)
- Industry: Broadcast and Digital
- Founded: 1986; 40 years ago
- Founder: Adam Young
- Defunct: November 12, 2013
- Fate: Merged with Media General
- Successor: Media General; Nexstar Media Group
- Headquarters: Nashville, Tennessee; New York, New York, United States
- Key people: Deborah A. McDermott; (president / CEO)
- Services: Television stations, Digital media, Mobile publishing

Young Broadcasting, LLC was an American media company that owned or operated 12 television stations in 10 markets with a total U.S. television household coverage of 5.9%. The company was formerly known as Young Broadcasting Inc. and was the outgrowth of the ad representation firm Adam Young Inc., which was founded in 1944 by Adam Young. Previously a public company, Young Broadcasting voluntarily declared Chapter 11 bankruptcy on February 13, 2009, to restructure its debts.

On June 24, 2010, the company emerged from bankruptcy as New Young Broadcasting Holding Co, Inc., shedding $800 million in debt and becoming one of the most financially secure broadcasting companies in the country. Deborah A. McDermott was named president and CEO of the new company, in which Standard General L.P., an American hedge fund, maintained a controlling interest.

On November 12, 2013, privately held Young Broadcasting acquired a controlling interest in Media General through a reverse merger. Following the merger, the new company was owned 67.5 percent by Young shareholders and 32.5 percent by Media General shareholders. The newly merged company would continue to operate as Media General with headquarters in Richmond, Virginia and trade on the New York Stock Exchange.

== History ==
Young Broadcasting entered station ownership in 1986, when it purchased stations in Lansing, Michigan and La Crosse, Wisconsin (a separate deal in 1988 would see Young acquire a station in Rockford, Illinois); Young purchased KLFY-TV in Lafayette, Louisiana in 1988 from Texoma Broadcasters, Inc., and subsequently WKRN-TV/Nashville and WTEN/Albany, New York in 1989 from Knight Ridder.

In May 1992, Young reached an agreement to purchase five television stations from Houston-based H&C Communications. The stations included KPRC-TV (H&C's flagship station) in Houston, KSAT-TV in San Antonio, WESH in Daytona Beach/Orlando, KVOA-TV in Tucson and KCCI-TV in Des Moines. However, the sale of these stations was cancelled due to Young's failure to obtain financing.

Young would expand its station roster with the 1994 purchase of three stations – WATE-TV/Knoxville, Tennessee; WRIC-TV/Richmond, Virginia and WBAY-TV/Green Bay, Wisconsin, from Nationwide Communications. Los Angeles independent KCAL-TV was purchased from The Walt Disney Company in 1996 and later sold to Viacom in 2002. Also in 1996, Young purchased KWQC-TV/Davenport, Iowa from Broad Street Television, L.P., and KELO-TV/Sioux Falls, South Dakota from Midcontinent Media, Inc.

In 2000, Young Broadcasting purchased NBC affiliate KRON-TV/San Francisco, California from Chronicle Publishing Company (the purchase also included a 51% stake in the station's local cable news channel BayTV, which would be shut down in 2001). Fortunes for KRON and its new owners would soon take a sharp decline when NBC chose to affiliate with (and eventually purchase) San Jose-based KNTV, after an attempt by the network to impose O&O-esque operational requirements and control of the station's schedule upon Young to retain the affiliation, which Young refused. KRON became an independent station in 2002 and eventually took affiliation with MyNetworkTV in 2006.

The company voluntarily declared Chapter 11 bankruptcy on February 13, 2009, with the U.S. Bankruptcy Court for the Southern District of New York. The massive debt load Young incurred from its purchase and ownership of KRON was widely believed to have been a contributing factor to the company's 2009 bankruptcy declaration.

On July 22, 2009, a New York bankruptcy judge approved a plan transferring ownership of Young and its stations to the company's secured lenders (among them Wachovia and Credit Suisse) for $220 million. The plan included Gray Television coming in as an outside party and advise on operations of Young-owned stations in seven markets through December 31, 2012 (although Young still had the final word on the stations' operations, including programming and personnel). The agreement did not include Young's three other stations: KRON-TV/San Francisco, California, WATE-TV/Knoxville, Tennessee, and WLNS-TV/Lansing, Michigan, in which the latter two due to Gray already owning stations in those markets. WBAY and KWQC would eventually be purchased by Gray in 2017 as part of spin-off requirements to close the Media General merger with Nexstar mentioned below.

On June 24, 2010, emerging from bankruptcy, Young released a statement indicating that the company had transferred from publicly traded status to private ownership by its former senior lenders, shedding "nearly $800 million in debt and millions of dollars of burdensome contracts" during its bankruptcy.

Young invested $25 million in its stations, which led to a major overhaul of news production in 2011, allowing most of the stations to convert their news programming to full high definition (except for KRON-TV, whose newscasts continue to be produced in widescreen standard definition). In 2013 Young introduced an editorial philosophy dubbed "One Newsroom", which uses multi-platform publishing systems to quickly distribute content across their broadcast, web, mobile, and social media assets. Master control automation for its stations and asset management operations were upgraded in 2012.

In 2011, Young hired Cox Reps to represent it for national sales and announced plans to establish a dedicated Young Broadcasting sales team based in New York, Los Angeles and Chicago. Adam Young Inc., Young's previous rep firm, ceased operations in February 2011 after Cox was brought on board.

In January 2012, Young signed an affiliation agreement with The Walt Disney Company's Live Well Network for eight of its stations to carry the digital multicast channel (WKRN-TV, WRIC-TV, WTEN, WATE-TV, WBAY-TV, WLNS-TV and KLFY).

On August 20, 2012, Standard General filed an application with the Federal Communications Commission to receive approval to increase the New York City-based hedge fund's ownership stake in Young Broadcasting from 36.34% to a controlling stake of 50.03%.

On June 6, 2013, Young announced that it would sell itself to Media General, in a transaction described as a "reverse merger". The enlarged Media General would own 30 stations, reaching 14% of the United States. On November 8, the FCC approved the merger. The merger closed on November 12. Media General would then be absorbed to Nexstar Media Group in 2017. President and CEO Deborah A. McDermott would later become the CEO of Standard Media in 2018.

== Former stations ==
- Stations are arranged in alphabetical order by state and city of license.

Stations owned by Young Broadcasting
Media market	State	Station	Purchased	Sold	Notes
Los Angeles	California	KCAL-TV	1996	2002	
San Francisco	California	KRON-TV	2000	2013	
Rockford	Illinois	WTVO	1988	2004	
Davenport	Iowa	KWQC-TV	1996	2013	
Lafayette	Louisiana	KLFY-TV	1988	2013	
Adams	Massachusetts	WCDC-TV	1989	2013	(Note: Satellite of WTEN.)
Lansing	Michigan	WLNS-TV	1986	2013	
Lansing	Michigan	WLAJ	2013	2013	(Note: Owned by a third party and operated by Young.)
Lansing	Michigan	WHTV	2006	2013	
Albany	New York	WTEN	1989	2013	
Albany	New York	WXXA-TV	2012	2013	
Florence	South Dakota	KDLO-TV	1996	2013	(Note: Satellite of KELO-TV.)
Sioux Falls	South Dakota	KELO-TV	1996	2013	
Rapid City	South Dakota	KCLO-TV	1996	2013	
Reliance	South Dakota	KPLO-TV	1996	2013	
Knoxville	Tennessee	WATE-TV	1994	2013	
Nashville	Tennessee	WKRN-TV	1989	2013	
Richmond	Virginia	WRIC-TV	1994	2013	
Green Bay	Wisconsin	WBAY-TV	1994	2013	
La Crosse	Wisconsin	WKBT-TV	1986	2000	
