= Black Bear, California =

Unincorporated community in California, United States

Coordinates: 41°14′29″N 123°10′39″W

Black Bear was a gold mining town in Klamath County, now in unincorporated Siskiyou County, California, United States.

It is located on Black Bear Creek, a tributary of the South Fork Salmon River.

== History ==
Gold was discovered in the area in 1860, and Black Bear became the trading center for a number of mines in the area. A post office was established in 1869. From 1874 it was within that part of Klamath County annexed to Siskiyou County. Its post office was closed and moved to Sawyers Bar in 1941.
