= M. H. de Young =

American journalist and businessman (1849–1925)

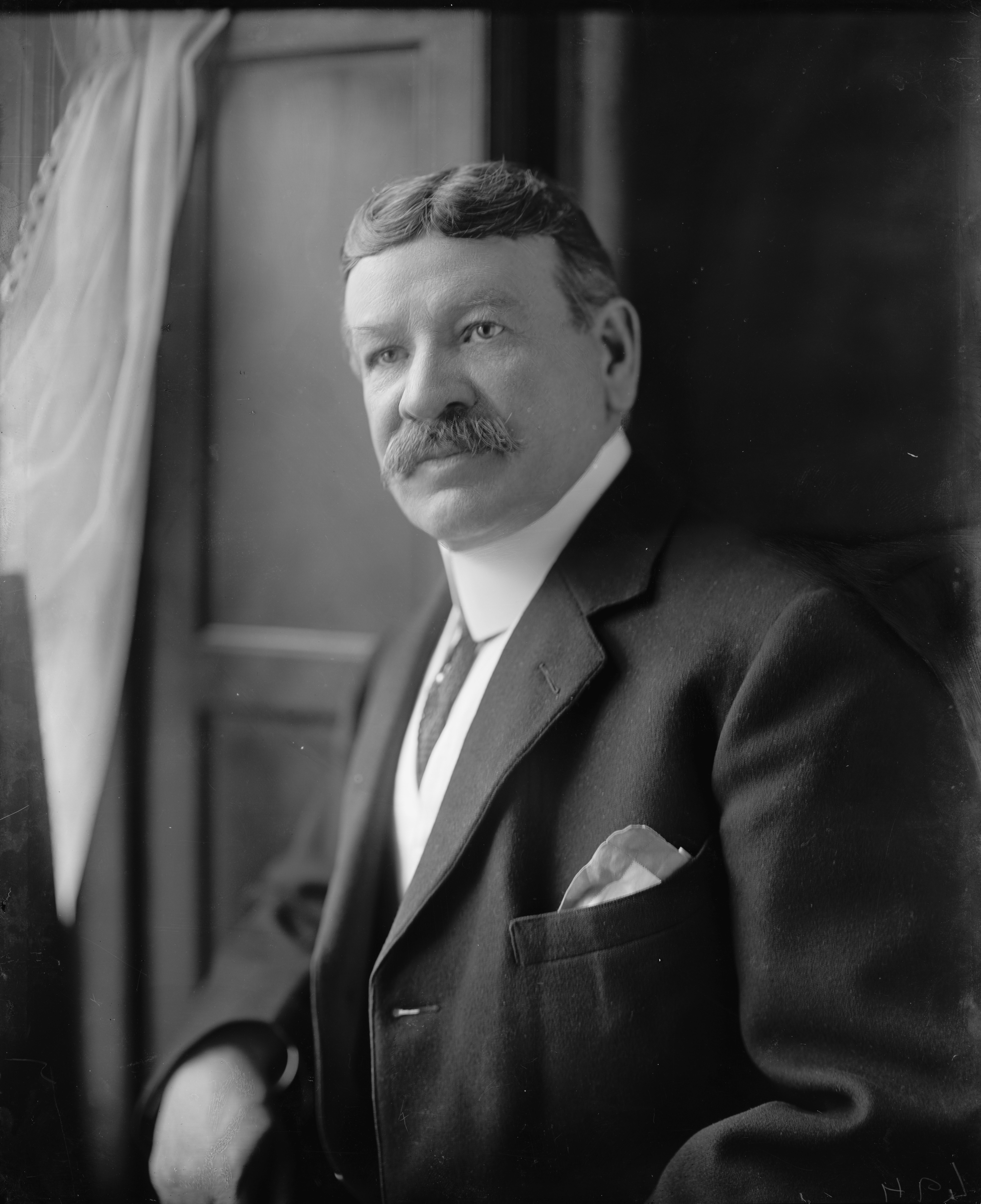
- De Young c. 1905–1925
- Born: Michael Henry de Young; September 30, 1849; St. Louis, Missouri, U.S.
- Died: February 15, 1925 (aged 75); San Francisco, California, U.S.
- Education: Heald College
- Occupation: Newspaper publisher
- Years active: 1865–1925
- Known for: Co-founder of San Francisco Chronicle and director of the Associated Press
- Relatives: Charles de Young (brother); Max Thieriot (great-great-grandson)

Michael Henry de Young (September 30, 1849 – February 15, 1925) was an American journalist and businessman. With his brother he co-founded the paper that would become the San Francisco Chronicle.

== Early life ==
De Young was born in St. Louis, Missouri. The family was Jewish. Michael in later years claimed that his father was a Baltimore banker of French birth, but he may have been a peripatetic jeweler and dry-goods merchant named De Jong or De Jongh. Michael was the son of Cornelia "Amelia" (née Morange; 1809–1881) and Miechel de Young (died 1854), who married in 1837. His maternal grandfather, Benjamin Morange, who served as the French Minister to Spain under Napoleon I, moved to the United States about 1815 and helped found the B'nai Jeshurun Congregation in New York in 1825.

The de Young family moved from St. Louis to San Francisco in 1854. M. H. de Young's father was said to have died of a stroke during the journey. M. H. de Young attended and graduated from Heald College, a San Francisco college founded in 1863.

== Career ==
=== News ===
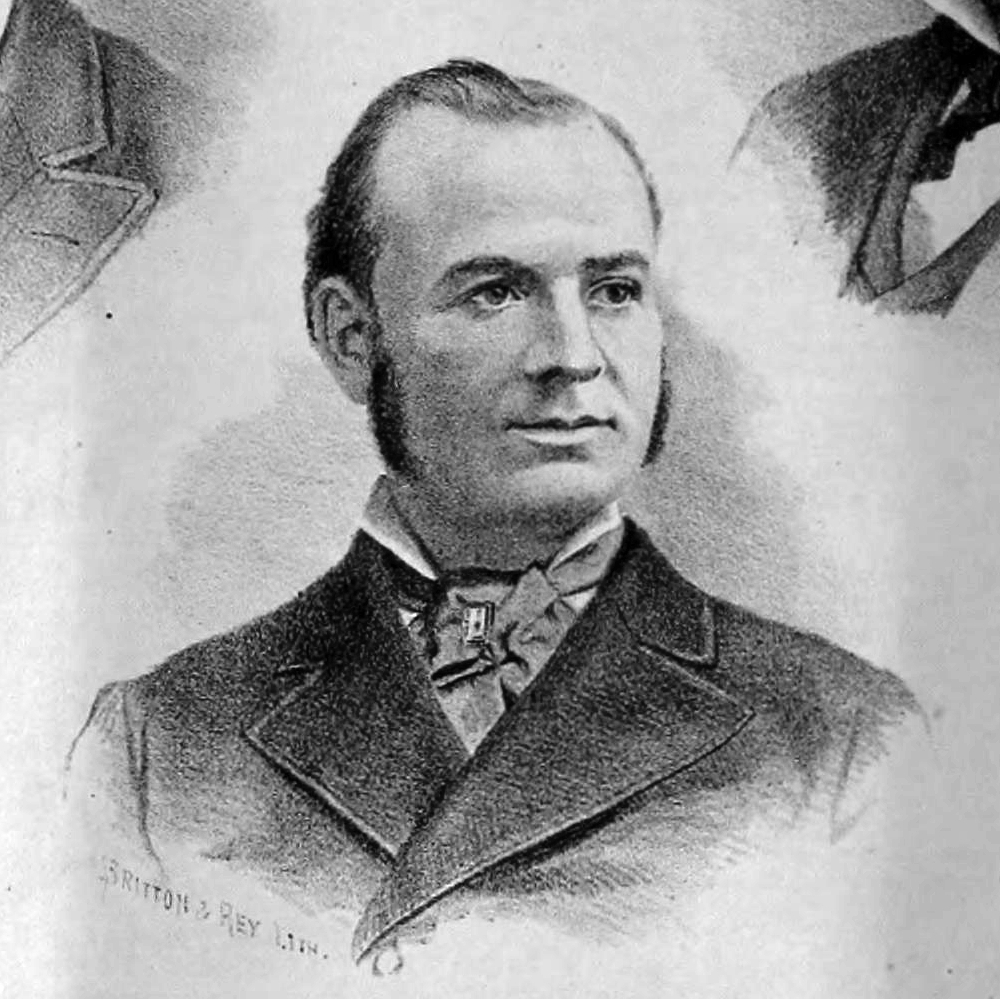
De Young c. 1880

In San Francisco, de Young and his brother, Charles de Young (1846–1880), founded the Daily Dramatic Chronicle newspaper, first published on January 17, 1865, with the loan of a twenty dollar gold piece which Michael received from his landlord. A third brother, Gustavus, whose initial originally appeared in the masthead ("G. and C. de Young"), later vanished. The Daily Dramatic Chronicle was a four-page tabloid that was freely distributed throughout San Francisco. According to the de Youngs, the Daily Dramatic Chronicle would be "the best advertising medium on the Pacific Coast." On September 1, 1868, the de Youngs expanded their tabloid into a daily newspaper. The first issue stated that the Chronicle would be "independent in all things, neutral in none." The Daily Dramatic Chronicle was sold under the condition that it be renamed the Dramatic Review. De Young was also the director of the Associated Press for many years.

=== Public leadership ===
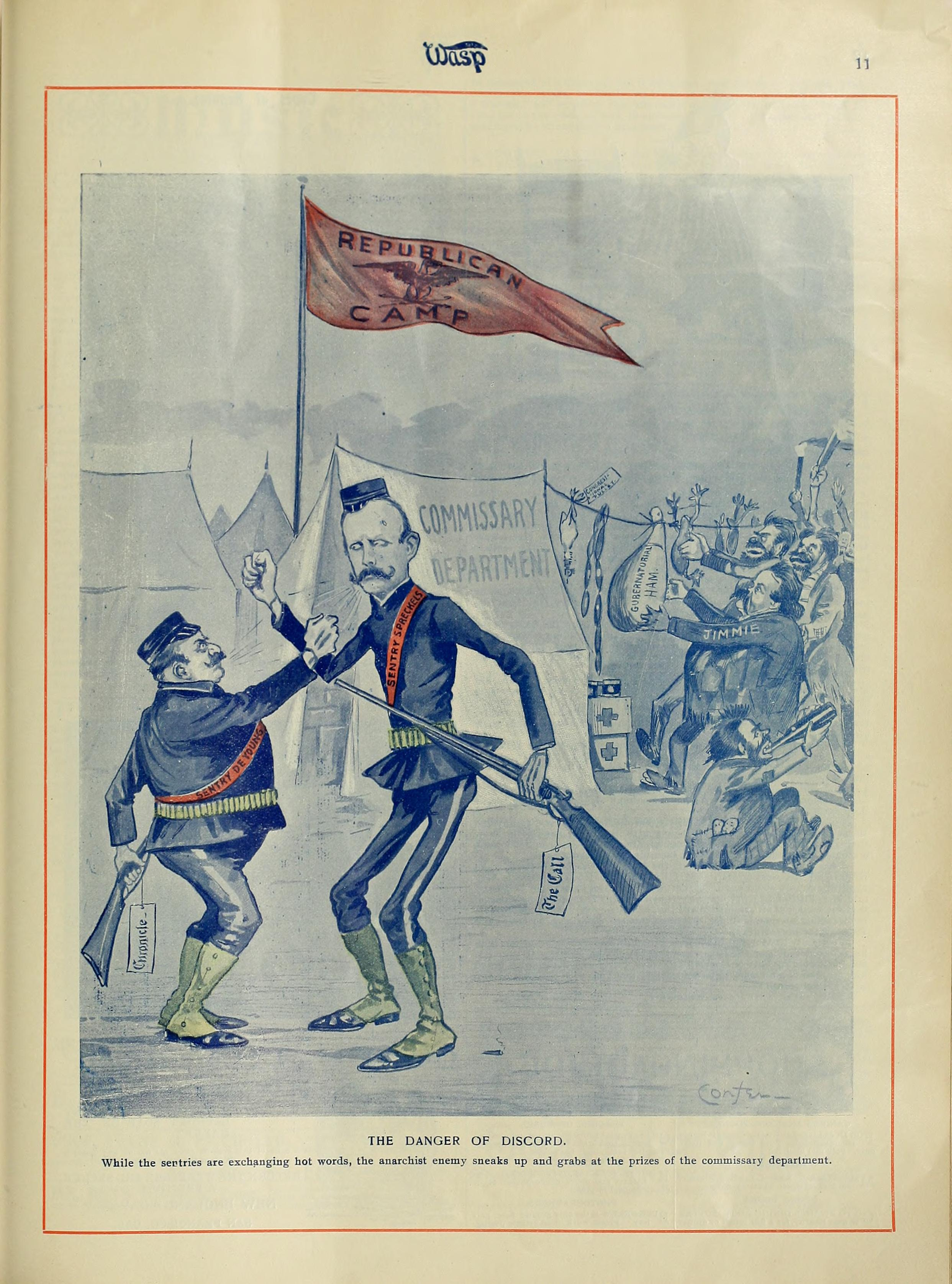
"The Danger of Discord," a political cartoon by C. H. Confer published in The Wasp mocking de Young and fellow Republican newspaperman John D. Spreckels for their infighting, insinuating it would lead to the election of Democrat James G. Maguire as Governor of California, September 24, 1898

De Young, inspired by the events of the Chicago World's Fair, led a campaign to bring a world's fair to San Francisco. De Young then became the director-general of the California Midwinter International Exposition of 1894. During a visit to New York City, De Young was inspired by the Metropolitan Museum of Art's location in Central Park. As a result, de Young wanted the fair to be held in Golden Gate Park. However, John McLaren, the superintendent of Golden Gate Park, was concerned about how the removal of many trees would affect the environment of the park. In an intense debate, de Young asked McLaren, "What is a tree? "What are a thousand trees compared to the benefits of the exposition?" Significantly, de Young owned about 31 blocks south of the park and could have been motivated by the fair's potential positive impacts on his real estate holdings. While the vast majority of the fair's buildings were soon destroyed, de Young persuaded the city to save the Fine Arts Building. The building was renamed the M. H. de Young Memorial Museum after de Young's death. De Young supported the museum throughout his life and bequeathed $150,000 to the museum upon his death.

In 1895 he was nominated for U.S. Senate, but lost to fellow Republican George C. Perkins.

== Personal life ==
De Young and his wife Katherine had five children:

- Charles de Young (1881–1913)
- Helen de Young (1883–1969), who married George T. Cameron (1873–1955)
- Constance Marie de Young (1885–1968), who married Joseph Oliver Tobin (1878–1978)
- Kathleen Yvonne de Young (1888–1954), who married Ferdinand Thieriot (1883–1920)
- Phyllis D. de Young (1892–1988), who married Nion Robert Tucker (1885–1950)

In 1884, De Young was shot by an irate businessman, Adolph B. Spreckels, apparently due to a negative newspaper article, and survived the injury. De Young died on February 15, 1925; a Roman Catholic mass was held in St. Mary's Cathedral (he had converted to Catholicism after marrying his wife, Katherine I. Deane).

=== Legacy ===
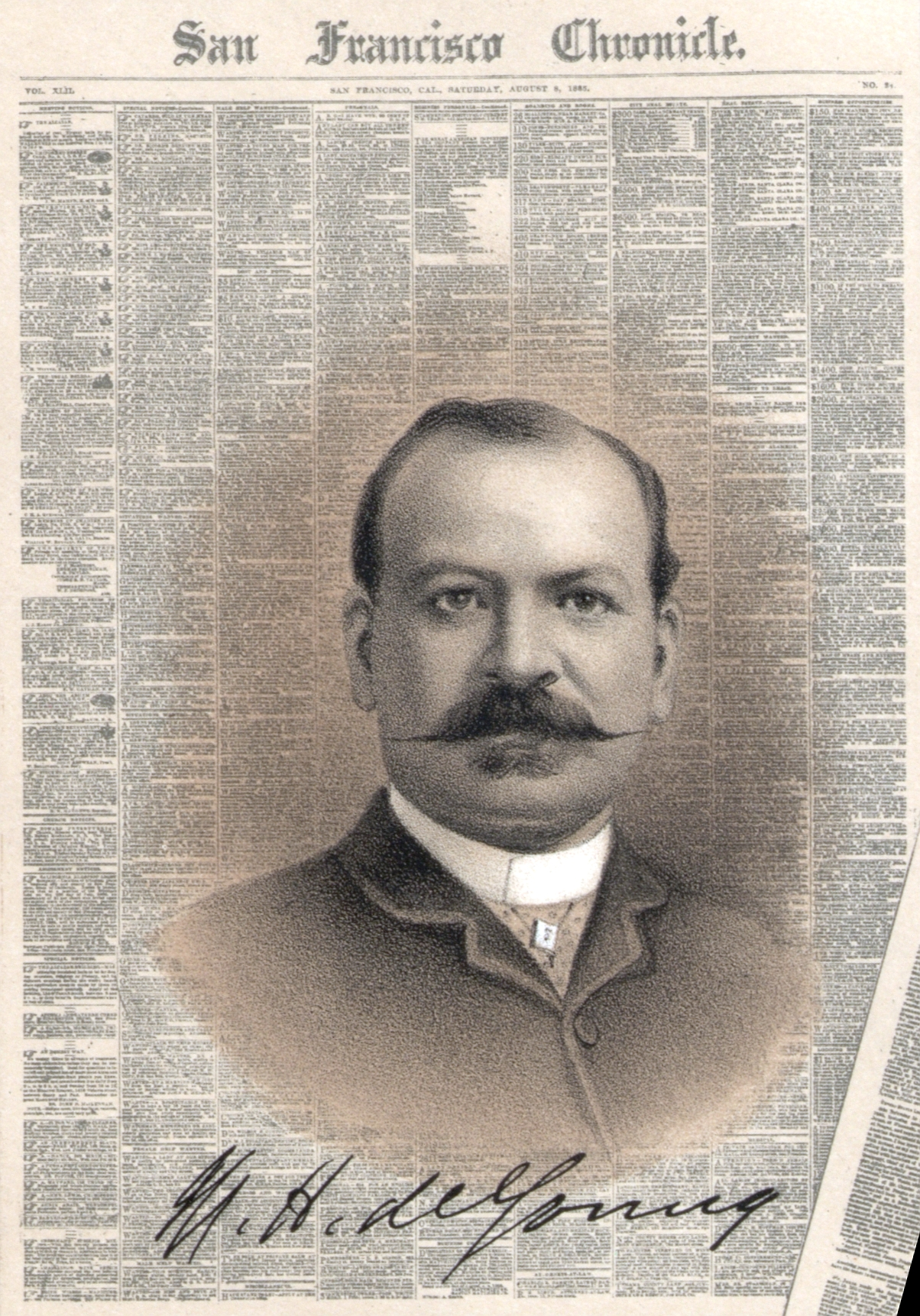
De Young and the San Francisco Chronicle in 1885

The M. H. de Young Memorial Museum in San Francisco's Golden Gate Park, is named in his honor. According to his daughter, Helen de Young Cameron, de Young "loved objects. He was an incurable collector. He collected everything. He stored his collections at the Memorial Museum, where he would visit them at all hours. He took genuine delight in sharing them with the citizens of San Francisco, insisting that his museum never charge admission." De Young purchased many things of "curious and artistic and instructive value" for the museum.

=== Descendants ===
In 1956, one of De Young's grandsons, Ferdinand Melly Thieriot (1921–1956), the circulation director of The Chronicle, and his wife Frances (1921–1956), were among the 46 killed aboard the SS Andrea Doria when it was struck by the MS Stockholm off the coast of Nantucket.

De Young was the grandfather of Nan Tucker McEvoy (1919–2015), chair of Chronicle Publishing Company's board of directors until the 1990s. He is also the great-great-grandfather of actor Max Thieriot (born 1988). His great-granddaughter, Kit Tobin, married society reporter and lawyer George Whipple III.
