= Scott River =

Scott River Beaver River
- Location of the mouth of Scott River in California

Location
- Country: United States
- State: California
- Region: Siskiyou County

Physical characteristics
- Source: Confluence of South Fork Scott River and East Fork Scott River
  - location: Callahan, California
  - coordinates: 41°18′45″N 122°48′12″W
  - elevation: 3,120 ft (950 m)
- Mouth: Confluence with the Klamath River
  - coordinates: 41°46′44″N 123°02′06″W
  - elevation: 1,460 ft (450 m)
- Length: 60 mi (97 km)
- Basin size: 804 sq mi (2,080 km^{2})
- Discharge
  - location: near Fort Jones
  - average: 627 cu ft/s (17.8 m^{3}/s)
  - minimum: 3.4 cu ft/s (0.096 m^{3}/s)
  - maximum: 54,600 cu ft/s (1,550 m^{3}/s)

Basin features
- Tributaries
  - left: South Fork Scott River
  - right: East Fork Scott River

National Wild and Scenic River
- Designated: January 19, 1981

The Scott River is a north by northwest-flowing 60-mile-long (97 km) river in Siskiyou County, California, United States. It is a tributary of the Klamath River, one of the largest rivers in California.

== Watershed ==
The Scott River's watershed covers about 800 square miles (2,100 km^{2}). The 55 miles (89 km)-long Scott River mainstem is formed by the confluence of the 16 miles (26 km)-long East Fork Scott River and the 11 miles (18 km)-long South Fork Scott River at the town of Callahan.

About two-thirds of the land is privately owned and about one-third is publicly owned. About 45 percent of the land is used for forestry, grazing for 40 percent, 13 percent for cropland and the remaining 2 percent of land is used for various purposes. The Scott River enters the Klamath River above Hamburg, California where its waters flow to the Pacific Ocean.

== History ==
Historically, fur trappers called the river the Beaver River, before the Hudson's Bay Company nearly extirpated beaver from the area in the early 19th century. Scott Valley was first entered ( first Europeans) Stephen Meek, Thomas McKay, George Adolphus Duzel and 16 other Hudson's Bay trappers in 1836. In 1850 alone, Meek reportedly trapped 1,800 beaver in Scott Valley, which was then known as Beaver Valley. Meek, who had hunted all over the West, declared the Beaver Valley one of the best places he had ever seen to trap beaver and hunt game, and returned to retire there at the Josiah Doll ranch from 1871 until his death in 1889 at the age of 90. The 1850 discovery of gold during the California Gold Rush by pioneer John W. Scott at Scott Bar, downriver from Scott Valley, brought many prospectors into the area; Scott's discovery led to the naming of the valley and the river in his honor.

Dredges that operated in the Scott Valley between 1934 and 1950 did some of the most visible damage done during the mining era. Large Yuba dredges, which also used mercury to process sand and gravel, excavated material 50 to 60 feet (15 to 18 m) below the river channel and flood plains and created piles of tailings more than 25 feet (7.6 m) high downstream of Callahan,

In Sugar Creek, a Scott River tributary that is usually ephemeral, local landowner Betsy Stapleton worked with Michael Pollock of NOAA to create beaver dam analogues (BDAs) by driving posts into the creek bed to attract beavers to build dams. Now, Stapleton's reach on Sugar Creek has perennial beaver ponds while the neighboring creeks run dry in summer and fall. Pollock's method had been used successfully in Bridge Creek, Oregon where the subsequent increase in beaver dams led to a dramatic 175% increase in steelhead trout (Oncorhynchus mykiss) abundance. In 2026 Pollock et al. published the similarly dramatic impact of installing BDAs on coho salmon (Oncorhynchus kisutch) in the Sugar Creek and French Creek tributaries of the mainstem Scott River: juvenile coho salmon survival rose from 8% to 60% and in two years became the dominant source of coho in four nearby Klamath River tributaries.

The Beaver Valley Headwaters Preserve has been protected by The Wildlands Conservancy along the East Fork Scott River. In August 2026 the Wildlands Conservancy announced that it was acquiring the AP Ranch, adding an adjacent 8.0 miles (12.9 km) of East Fork Scott River and adding 14,177 acres (57.37 km^{2}) to the existing 6,000 acres (24 km^{2}) property.

== See also ==
- Scott Valley
