= Scott Bar =

Scott Bar may refer to:

- Scott Bar, California, unincorporated community in Siskiyou County, California
- Scott Bar Mountains, mountain range in Siskiyou County, California
- Scott Bar salamander, species of salamander
