= Scott Valley =

Coordinates: 41.5541°N 122.8552°W

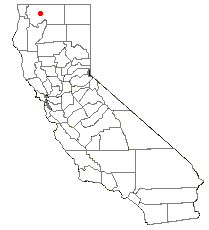
Location of Scott Valley in California

Scott Valley is a large, scenic rural area of western Siskiyou County, California, known for its vistas of the Marble Mountains, cattle and dairy ranches, and its historic background as a gold mining area, dating back to the days of the California Gold Rush. The towns of Fort Jones, Etna, Greenview and Callahan are found within Scott Valley, as well as many other small villages.

Drained by the federally designated Wild & Scenic Scott River, Scott Valley is steeped in history. At the time of the first contact with Europeans in the 1830s, the valley was occupied by the Scott Valley branch of the Shasta tribe of Native Americans. Scott Valley was first entered by Stephen Meek, Thomas McKay, George Adolphus Duzel and 16 other Hudson's Bay trappers in 1836. Meek reportedly trapped 1,800 beaver from the valley in the year 1850 alone. Meek, who had hunted all over the West, declared the Beaver Valley, soon to be renamed Scott Valley, one of the best places he had ever seen to trap beaver and hunt game, and returned to retire there at the Josiah Doll ranch from 1871 until his death in 1889 at the age of 90.

An early road, an alternative to the Siskiyou Trail, wound its way up from Shasta, California, through Scott Valley to Yreka, California, and then into Oregon. This route remained in steady use until the development of more established stagecoach roads in the 1860s (and later the railroad in the 1880s) along the Sacramento River to the east. Today, the valley is served by California State Route 3, linking Hayfork and Weaverville to Yreka. It serves as the link between other regional thoroughfares, California State Route 299 & California State Route 36 to the northern stretch of the regions primary north-south expressway, Interstate 5.

The 1850 discovery of gold during the California Gold Rush by pioneer John W. Scott at Scott Bar, downriver from Scott Valley, brought many prospectors into the area; Scott's discovery led to the naming of the valley and the river in his honor.

The town of Fort Jones started in the 1850s first as trading post for the Forty-Niners who came in search of gold, and later took the name Fort Jones from a U.S. Army post which was established nearby.

Scott Valley's weekly newspaper the Pioneer Press, located at 12021 Main Street in Fort Jones, was established on November 16, 1972, by Gary Mortenson. The town of Etna was the site of early mills supplying flour and was originally named Aetna Mills.

Gold recovery operations continued well into the Twentieth century, including substantial dredging for gold along the Scott River. Until the mid-1990s Scott Valley's economy relied heavily on logging, an industry which is now in decline.

A local native plant, the Scott Valley phacelia (Phacelia greenei), was named for the valley and is found nowhere else.

== See also ==
- Scott River
