= Sawyers Bar, California =

Unincorporated community in California, United States

Sawyers Bar
- unincorporated community
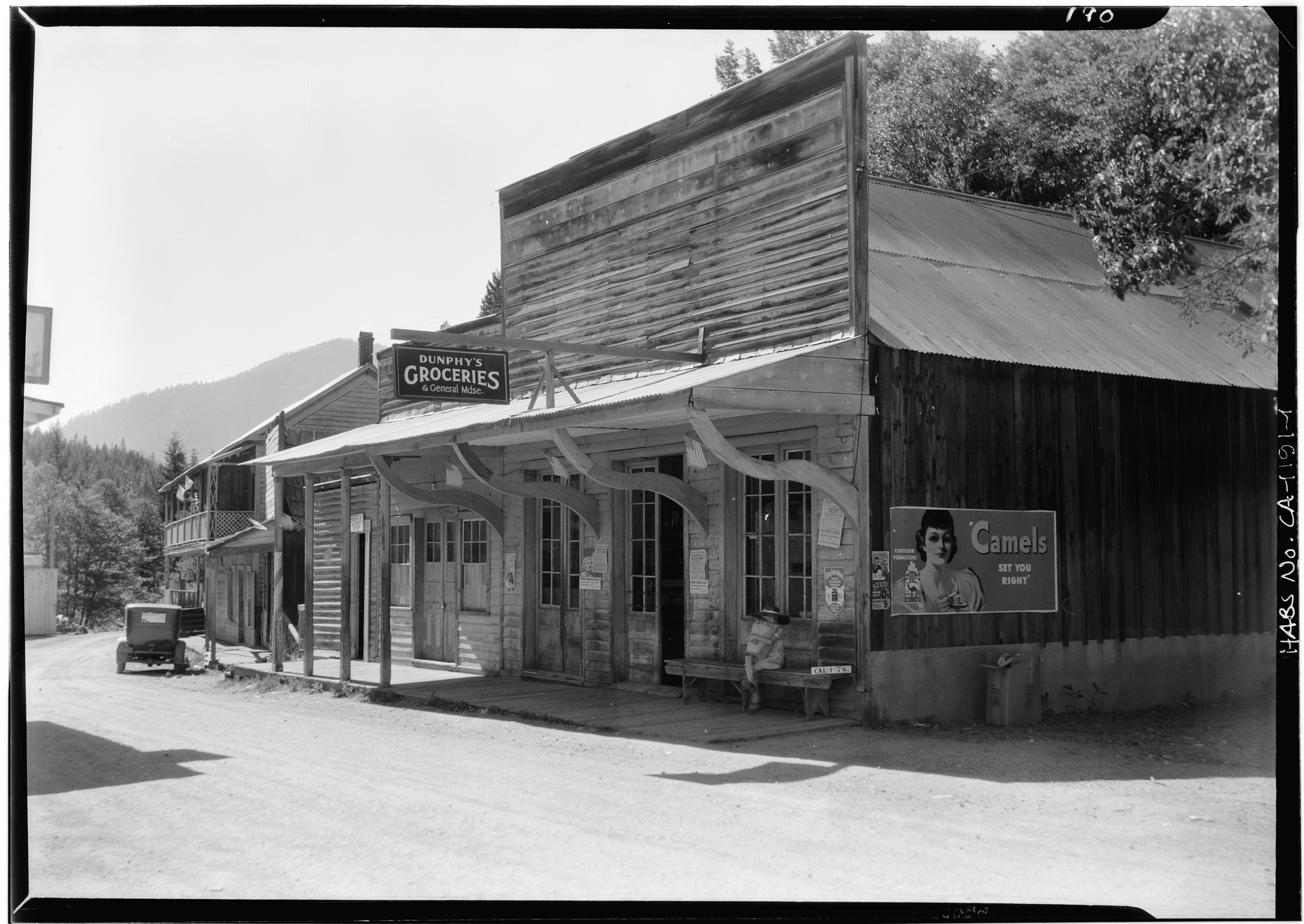
- Store buildings in Sawyers Bar, 1937

- Location in California Sawyers Bar (the United States)
- Coordinates: 41°17′50.64″N 123°7′49.08″W
- Country: United States
- State: California
- County: Siskiyou
- Established: 1851
- Elevation: 2,247 ft (685 m)

Sawyers Bar is an unincorporated community located on the North Fork Salmon River in unincorporated Siskiyou County, California, United States, not to be confused with a Sawyers or Lawyers Bar in Del Norte County.

== History ==
Sawyers Bar, now in Siskiyou County, was a California Gold Rush mining camp, first in Trinity County (one of the original counties of California, created in 1850 at the time of statehood). Then following the rush to the Klamath and Salmon Rivers, it became part of the now defunct Klamath County from 1851 to 1874. It was then within that part of Klamath County annexed to Siskiyou County. Sawyers Bar, was one of the largest gold producers in the county that year, along with Negro Flat, Gullion's Bar and Bestville. Currently, Sawyers Bar has a population of about 20 permanent residents and about 34 during the summer.

== Climate ==
Climate data for Sawyers Bar Ranger Station, California, 1931–2016
Month	Jan	Feb	Mar	Apr	May	Jun	Jul	Aug	Sep	Oct	Nov	Dec	Year
Record high °F (°C)	74 (23)	82 (28)	90 (32)	100 (38)	109 (43)	111 (44)	118 (48)	115 (46)	112 (44)	110 (43)	80 (27)	67 (19)	118 (48)
Mean daily maximum °F (°C)	49.8 (9.9)	54.0 (12.2)	58.4 (14.7)	65.8 (18.8)	75.5 (24.2)	85.2 (29.6)	94.9 (34.9)	94.0 (34.4)	87.0 (30.6)	73.2 (22.9)	55.7 (13.2)	47.2 (8.4)	70.1 (21.2)
Mean daily minimum °F (°C)	31.5 (−0.3)	31.7 (−0.2)	34.1 (1.2)	37.3 (2.9)	43.6 (6.4)	49.1 (9.5)	55.7 (13.2)	55.0 (12.8)	49.6 (9.8)	41.7 (5.4)	34.8 (1.6)	31.0 (−0.6)	41.3 (5.1)
Record low °F (°C)	2 (−17)	11 (−12)	19 (−7)	21 (−6)	25 (−4)	27 (−3)	30 (−1)	36 (2)	27 (−3)	23 (−5)	15 (−9)	−4 (−20)	−4 (−20)
Average precipitation inches (mm)	8.38 (213)	5.62 (143)	5.25 (133)	2.22 (56)	1.55 (39)	0.97 (25)	0.26 (6.6)	0.57 (14)	0.90 (23)	3.78 (96)	6.13 (156)	8.15 (207)	43.78 (1,111.6)
Average snowfall inches (cm)	8.9 (23)	3.5 (8.9)	3.3 (8.4)	0.2 (0.51)	0.1 (0.25)	0.0 (0.0)	0.0 (0.0)	0.0 (0.0)	0.0 (0.0)	0.0 (0.0)	1.1 (2.8)	4.4 (11)	21.5 (54.86)
Average precipitation days (≥ 0.01 in)	12	11	12	9	6	4	1	2	3	7	11	12	91
Source: WRCC

== See also ==
- Bestville, California
