= Scott Bar Mountains =

Mountain range in Siskiyou County, California

- Location within California

Highest point
- Elevation: 1,627 m (5,338 ft)

Geography
- Country: United States
- State: California
- District: Siskiyou County
- Range coordinates: 41°41′59.487″N 122°56′34.126″W
- Topo map: USGS Russell Peak

The Scott Bar Mountains are a mountain range in Siskiyou County, California, United States. The area is named after gold miner John W. Scott who found a large gold nugget at what is now the town of Scott Bar.
