= Etna, California =

City in California, United States

Etna, California Etna Mills (former)
- City
- City of Etna
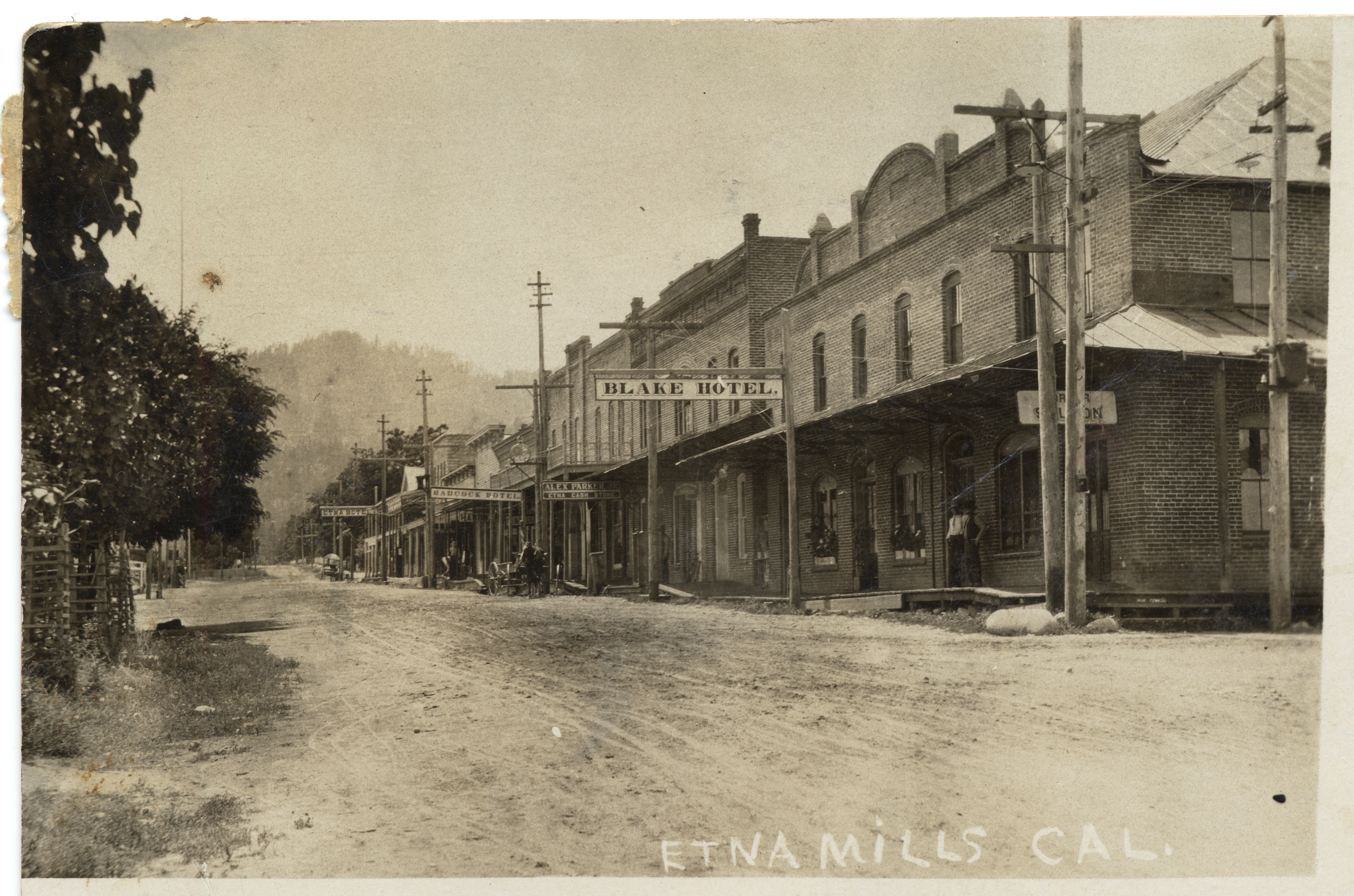

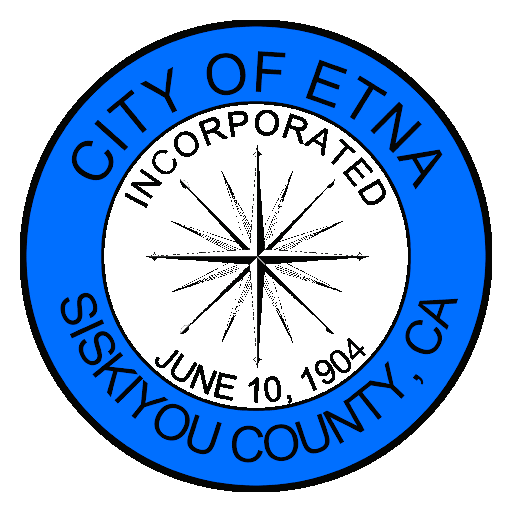
- Seal
- Interactive map of Etna, California
- Location in the United States
- Coordinates: 41°27′26″N 122°53′49″W
- Country: United States
- State: California
- County: Siskiyou
- Incorporated: March 13, 1878

Government
  - Type: Elected
  - Mayor: Cliff Munson
  - City clerk: Pamela Eastlick
  - Chief of police: Joshua E. Short

Area
  - Total: 0.76 sq mi (1.97 km^{2})
  - Land: 0.76 sq mi (1.97 km^{2})
  - Water: 0 sq mi (0.00 km^{2}) 0.12%
- Elevation: 2,936 ft (895 m)

Population (2020)
  - Total: 678
  - Density: 891/sq mi (344/km^{2})
- Time zone: UTC-8 (Pacific)
  - Summer (DST): UTC-7 (PDT)
- ZIP code: 96027
- Area code: 530
- FIPS code: 06-22972
- GNIS feature IDs: 277509, 2410458
- Website: www.etnaca.com

Etna is a town in the Scott Valley area of Siskiyou County, California, United States. Its population is 678 as of the 2020 census, down from 737 from the 2010 census.

== Name ==
Originally named Rough and Ready, it was changed by statute in 1874 to Etna after the local flour mill (spelled Ætna/Aetna after Mount Ætna in Sicily).

== History ==
The town began in 1853 as the rough-and-tumble Gold Rush settlement of Rough and Ready, which was later incorporated as the City of Etna in 1878.

In 1854 a flour mill was built a mile away and named the Aetna Mills. However, the winter of 1861-62 it was destroyed by a flood and the remaining businesses moved to Rough and Ready Mill near the current town. This also including the post office which kept the name Aetna Mills.

== Geography ==
Etna is located at 41°27′26″N 122°53′49″W (41.457350, -122.896875). Etna is in Northern California near the Oregon border, located in Scott Valley near the CDP of Greenview, the city of Fort Jones, and the unincorporated community of Callahan. Etna is located at the foot of the Marble Mountain Wilderness in the Siskiyou subrange of the Klamath (Cascades) Range and is an attraction for hikers, rafters, climbers and people who do all sorts of other outdoor activities.

According to the United States Census Bureau, the city has a total area of 0.8 square miles (2.1 km^{2}), of which 99.88% land and 0.12% is water.

== Demographics ==
Historical population
Census	Pop.	Note	%±
1880	361		—
1890	271		−24.9%
1900	500		84.5%
1910	518		3.6%
1920	425		−18.0%
1930	379		−10.8%
1940	456		20.3%
1950	649		42.3%
1960	596		−8.2%
1970	667		11.9%
1980	754		13.0%
1990	835		10.7%
2000	781		−6.5%
2010	737		−5.6%
2020	678		−8.0%
U.S. Decennial Census

=== 2010 ===
At the 2010 census Etna had a population of 737. The population density was 971.6 inhabitants per square mile (375.1/km^{2}). The racial makeup of Etna was 627 (85.1%) White, 0 (0.0%) African American, 28 (3.8%) Native American, 1 (0.1%) Asian, 1 (0.1%) Pacific Islander, 6 (0.8%) from other races, and 74 (10.0%) from two or more races. Hispanic or Latino of any race were 26 people (3.5%).

The census reported that 731 people (99.2% of the population) lived in households, 6 (0.8%) lived in non-institutionalized group quarters, and no one was institutionalized.

There were 323 households, 93 (28.8%) had children under the age of 18 living in them, 141 (43.7%) were opposite-sex married couples living together, 36 (11.1%) had a female householder with no husband present, 24 (7.4%) had a male householder with no wife present. There were 19 (5.9%) unmarried opposite-sex partnerships, and 3 (0.9%) same-sex married couples or partnerships. 105 households (32.5%) were one person and 47 (14.6%) had someone living alone who was 65 or older. The average household size was 2.26. There were 201 families (62.2% of households); the average family size was 2.86.

The age distribution was 173 people (23.5%) under the age of 18, 35 people (4.7%) aged 18 to 24, 125 people (17.0%) aged 25 to 44, 251 people (34.1%) aged 45 to 64, and 153 people (20.8%) who were 65 or older. The median age was 48.5 years. For every 100 females, there were 101.9 males. For every 100 females age 18 and over, there were 97.2 males.

There were 359 housing units at an average density of 473.3 per square mile, of the occupied units 206 (63.8%) were owner-occupied and 117 (36.2%) were rented. The homeowner vacancy rate was 4.5%; the rental vacancy rate was 4.8%. 441 people (59.8% of the population) lived in owner-occupied housing units and 290 people (39.3%) lived in rental housing units.

=== 2000 ===
At the 2000 census there were 781 people in 329 households, including 210 families, in the city. The population density was 989.9 inhabitants per square mile (382.2/km^{2}). There were 362 housing units at an average density of 458.8 per square mile (177.1/km^{2}). The racial makeup of the city was 88.48% White, 0.13% African American, 6.02% Native American, 0.64% Asian, 1.02% from other races, and 3.71% from two or more races. Hispanic or Latino of any race were 3.46%.

Of the 329 households 28.0% had children under the age of 18 living with them, 48.9% were married couples living together, 11.6% had a female householder with no husband present, and 35.9% were non-families. 31.0% of households were one person and 17.6% were one person aged 65 or older. The average household size was 2.37 and the average family size was 2.98.

The age distribution was 26.1% under the age of 18, 4.7% from 18 to 24, 21.4% from 25 to 44, 25.1% from 45 to 64, and 22.7% 65 or older. The median age was 44 years. For every 100 females, there were 95.3 males. For every 100 females age 18 and over, there were 93.6 males.

The median income for a household in the city was $25,179, and the median family income was $30,461. Males had a median income of $25,972 versus $20,750 for females. The per capita income for the city was $13,737. About 13.7% of families and 19.7% of the population were below the poverty line, including 23.5% of those under age 18 and 9.1% of those age 65 or over.

== Government ==
In the California State Legislature, Etna is in the 1st senatorial district, represented by Republican Megan Dahle, and the 1st Assembly district, represented by Republican Heather Hadwick.

In the United States House of Representatives, Etna is in California's 1st congressional district, represented by Republican James Gallagher.

== Religious sites ==
St. Gregory Palamas Monastery, an Old Calendarist Christian monastery, is located in Etna, California. The Center for Traditionalist Orthodox Studies (established 1981) and the Metropolitan Cyprian Theological Library are located on the monastery grounds.

Saint Photios Orthodox Theological Seminary is also located in Etna, along with Saint Elizabeth the Grand Duchess of Russia Old Calendarist Convent.

== Notable residents ==
Anita Loos author, is buried in Etna
