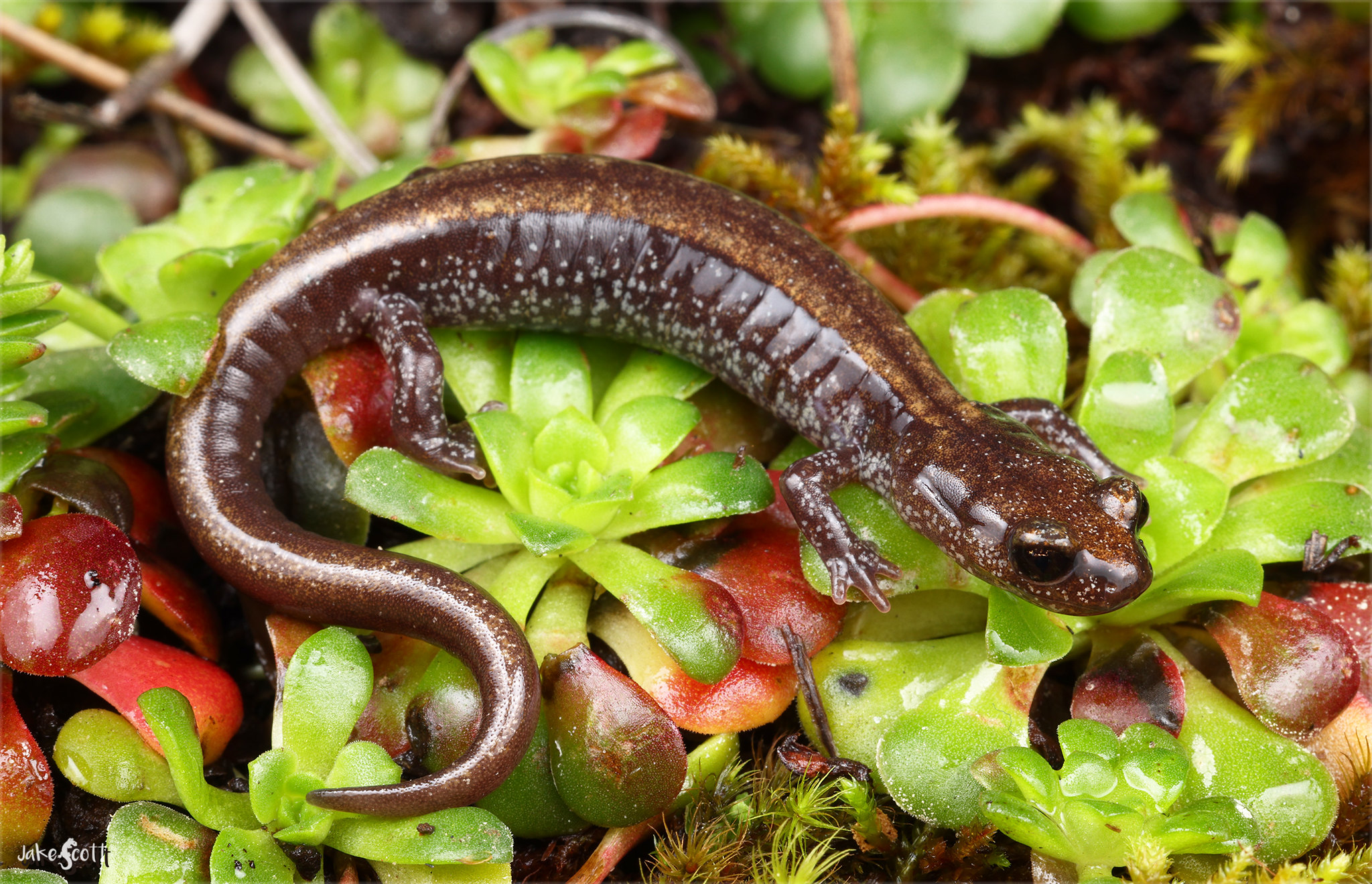

Conservation status
- Endangered (IUCN 3.1)

Scientific classification
- Kingdom: Animalia
- Phylum: Chordata
- Class: Amphibia
- Order: Urodela
- Family: Plethodontidae
- Genus: Plethodon
- Species: P. asupak

Binomial name
- Plethodon asupak Mead et al., 2005

= Scott Bar salamander =

Species of amphibian

The Scott Bar salamander (Plethodon asupak) is a species of salamander in the family Plethodontidae, endemic to the United States, where it is restricted to a very small range in the Scott River drainage in Siskiyou County, California, at altitudes between 700 and 1,300 metres (2,300 and 4,300 ft) above sea level. Described in 2005, it is one of the most recently described species in the large genus Plethodon.

== Description ==
P. asupak is a moderate-sized, robust salamander with long limbs growing to a snout-to-vent length of 61 mm (2.4 in) for males and 67 mm (2.6 in) for females. It has a broad brown or bronze dorsal stripe and is otherwise purplish-gray with white flecks that condense on the sides and limbs into larger patches. The underparts are dark gray or purplish mottled with paler gray and flecked with white. It frequently has gold spotting on its otherwise black irises. Juveniles have paired, reddish dorsal stripes.

== Distribution and habitat ==
A species endemic to California, it inhabits shaded, moss-covered talus slopes in old-growth mixed evergreen and montane fir forests of the Klamath Mountain Range. It was discovered in 2001, and is currently known from a few locations near the confluence of the Klamath and Scott Rivers, hence its common name Scott Bar salamander. Its range is only 20 km (13 mi) at its greatest dimension. Known elevations extend from 700 to 1,300 metres (2,300 to 4,300 ft) above sea level.

== Status ==
With a very restricted range and a habitat requirement for old-growth forest, this salamander is threatened by logging which is allowed, under certain circumstances, inside the national forest it inhabits. The International Union for Conservation of Nature has assessed it as being an endangered species.
