= Gullion's Bar, California =

Coordinates: 41°17′48″N 123°21′36″W

Gullion's Bar was a placer gold mining camp on the Salmon River, now located in Siskiyou County, California, United States. It was located originally in Trinity County, in 1850.

Gullion's Bar was one of the largest gold producers in Trinity County in 1850, along with Negro Flat, Bestville, and Sawyers Bar. In 1851, it became part of Klamath County. Eventually the Gullion's Bar placers played out. However, another strike on Nordheimer's Creek in the summer of 1858, on the same section of the Salmon River, revived the camp on what is now Nordheimer Flat. By 1868 it was equipped with a 2-mile ditch, to provide water to the mines.
