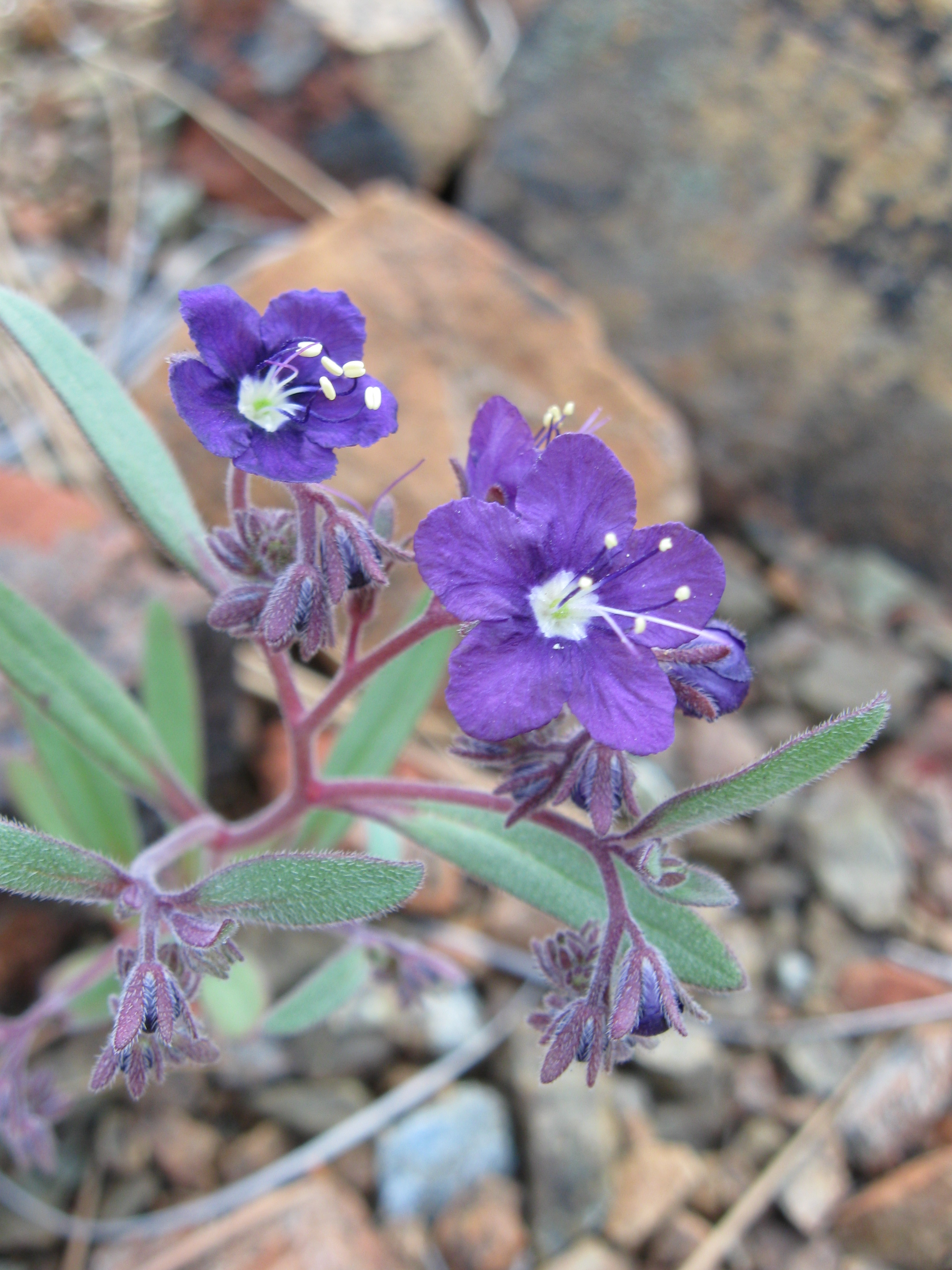

Conservation status
- Imperiled (NatureServe)

Scientific classification
- Kingdom: Plantae
- Clade: Tracheophytes
- Clade: Angiosperms
- Clade: Eudicots
- Clade: Asterids
- Order: Boraginales
- Family: Hydrophyllaceae
- Genus: Phacelia
- Species: P. greenei

Binomial name
- Phacelia greenei J.T.Howell

= Phacelia greenei =

Species of flowering plant

Phacelia greenei, commonly known as Scott Valley phacelia, is a species of Phacelia. It is endemic to the southern Klamath Mountains of far northern California, where it is known only from Scott Valley, a valley known for its alfalfa growing, and vicinity.

It is a serpentine soils endemic growing in the coniferous forests of the mountains.

This is an annual herb with a branching or unbranched erect stem reaching no more than about 15 centimeters in height. It is glandular and coated in short hairs called trichomes. The lance-shaped, smooth-edged leaves are up to 3 centimeters in length. The hairy inflorescence is a small, one-sided curving or coiling cyme of five-lobed flowers. Each flower is about half a centimeter long and deep purple or blue in color with a white or yellowish tubular throat. The leaves of the plant are alternate in pattern and are long and narrow. The herb begins blooming in April and stops in June.
