= Carrick, California =

- Unincorporated Community; Census Designated Place
- Location in Siskiyou County and the state of California

- Location in the United States
- Coordinates: 41°26′46″N 122°21′48″W
- Country: United States of America
- State: California
- County: Siskiyou

Area
  - Total: 0.058 sq mi (0.15 km^{2})
  - Land: 0.058 sq mi (0.15 km^{2})
  - Water: 0 sq mi (0.00 km^{2}) 0%
- Elevation: 3,497 ft (1,066 m)

Population (2020)
  - Total: 143
  - Density: 2,431.8/sq mi (938.93/km^{2})
- Time zone: UTC-8 (Pacific (PST))
  - Summer (DST): UTC-7 (PDT)
- ZIP code: 96094
- Area code: 530
- FIPS code: 06-11481
- GNIS feature ID: 1853381

Carrick is a census-designated place (CDP) in Siskiyou County, California, United States. Its population is 143 as of the 2020 census, up from 131 from the 2010 census. Carrick is located just outside the town of Weed, uses Weed in its mailing addresses and is generally viewed by locals as a neighborhood of Weed, though located outside of the city proper. On September 15, 2014, Carrick was under mandatory evacuation order due to a forest fire.

== Geography ==
According to the United States Census Bureau, the CDP has a total area of 0.06 square miles (0.16 km^{2}), all land.

== Demographics ==
Historical population
Census	Pop.	Note	%±
2000	156		—
2010	131		−16.0%
2020	143		9.2%
U.S. Decennial Census; 1850–1870 1880-1890; 1900 1910 1920; 1930 1940 1950; 1960 1970 1980; 1990 2000 2010

Carrick first appeared as a census designated place in the 2000 U.S. census.

=== 2020 census ===
As of the 2020 census, Carrick had a population of 143. The median age was 52.1 years. 19.6% of residents were under the age of 18 and 21.7% of residents were 65 years of age or older. For every 100 females there were 169.8 males, and for every 100 females age 18 and over there were 167.4 males age 18 and over.

0.0% of residents lived in urban areas, while 100.0% lived in rural areas.

There were 60 households in Carrick, of which 31.7% had children under the age of 18 living in them. Of all households, 51.7% were married-couple households, 30.0% were households with a male householder and no spouse or partner present, and 13.3% were households with a female householder and no spouse or partner present. About 23.4% of all households were made up of individuals and 11.7% had someone living alone who was 65 years of age or older.

There were 66 housing units, of which 9.1% were vacant. The homeowner vacancy rate was 3.7% and the rental vacancy rate was 0.0%.

Racial composition as of the 2020 census
Race	Number	Percent
White	117	81.8%
Black or African American	0	0.0%
American Indian and Alaska Native	2	1.4%
Asian	0	0.0%
Native Hawaiian and Other Pacific Islander	0	0.0%
Some other race	7	4.9%
Two or more races	17	11.9%
Hispanic or Latino (of any race)	17	11.9%

=== 2010 census ===
The 2010 United States census reported that Carrick had a population of 131. The population density was 2,227.7 inhabitants per square mile (860.1/km^{2}). The racial makeup of Carrick was 110 (84.0%) White, 7 (5.3%) African American, 2 (1.5%) Native American, 2 (1.5%) Asian, 0 (0.0%) Pacific Islander, 1 (0.8%) from other races, and 9 (6.9%) from two or more races. Hispanic or Latino of any race were 8 persons (6.1%).

The Census reported that 131 people (100% of the population) lived in households, 0 (0%) lived in non-institutionalized group quarters, and 0 (0%) were institutionalized.

There were 52 households, out of which 20 (38.5%) had children under the age of 18 living in them, 22 (42.3%) were opposite-sex married couples living together, 8 (15.4%) had a female householder with no husband present, 7 (13.5%) had a male householder with no wife present. There were 2 (3.8%) unmarried opposite-sex partnerships, and 1 (1.9%) same-sex married couples or partnerships. 14 households (26.9%) were made up of individuals, and 3 (5.8%) had someone living alone who was 65 years of age or older. The average household size was 2.52. There were 37 families (71.2% of all households); the average family size was 2.95.

The population was spread out, with 36 people (27.5%) under the age of 18, 12 people (9.2%) aged 18 to 24, 19 people (14.5%) aged 25 to 44, 52 people (39.7%) aged 45 to 64, and 12 people (9.2%) who were 65 years of age or older. The median age was 42.8 years. For every 100 females, there were 98.5 males. For every 100 females age 18 and over, there were 102.1 males.

There were 65 housing units at an average density of 1,105.4 per square mile (426.8/km^{2}), of which 34 (65.4%) were owner-occupied, and 18 (34.6%) were occupied by renters. The homeowner vacancy rate was 5.4%; the rental vacancy rate was 14.3%. 82 people (62.6% of the population) lived in owner-occupied housing units and 49 people (37.4%) lived in rental housing units.

=== 2000 census ===
As of the census of 2000, there were 156 people, 56 households, and 38 families residing in the CDP. The population density was 2,279.3 inhabitants per square mile (880.0/km^{2}). There were 67 housing units at an average density of 978.9 per square mile (378.0/km^{2}). The racial makeup of the CDP was 91.03% White, 0.64% African American, 2.56% Native American, 1.92% from other races, and 3.85% from two or more races. Hispanic or Latino of any race were 9.62% of the population.

There were 56 households, out of which 44.6% had children under the age of 18 living with them, 53.6% were married couples living together, 7.1% had a female householder with no husband present, and 32.1% were non-families. 23.2% of all households were made up of individuals, and 10.7% had someone living alone who was 65 years of age or older. The average household size was 2.79 and the average family size was 3.37.

In the CDP, the population was spread out, with 32.7% under the age of 18, 3.8% from 18 to 24, 32.1% from 25 to 44, 21.8% from 45 to 64, and 9.6% who were 65 years of age or older. The median age was 32 years. For every 100 females, there were 88.0 males. For every 100 females age 18 and over, there were 90.9 males.

The median income for a household in the CDP was $22,986, and the median income for a family was $23,819. Males had a median income of $11,250 versus $11,750 for females. The per capita income for the CDP was $13,082. About 28.9% of families and 18.0% of the population were below the poverty line, including 11.4% of those under the age of eighteen and none of those 65 or over.

== Politics ==
In the state legislature Carrick is in the 1st senatorial district, represented by Republican Megan Dahle, and the 1st Assembly district, represented by Republican Heather Hadwick.

Federally, Carrick is in California's 1st congressional district, represented by Republican James Gallagher.
