= Gazelle, California =

- Unincorporated Community; Census Designated Place
- Location in Siskiyou County and the state of California

- Location in the United States
- Coordinates: 41°31′18″N 122°31′15″W
- Country: United States of America
- State: California
- County: Siskiyou

Area
  - Total: 0.672 sq mi (1.741 km^{2})
  - Land: 0.671 sq mi (1.739 km^{2})
  - Water: 0.00077 sq mi (0.002 km^{2}) 0.10%
- Elevation: 2,769 ft (844 m)

Population (2020)
  - Total: 95
  - Density: 140/sq mi (55/km^{2})
- Time zone: UTC-8 (Pacific (PST))
  - Summer (DST): UTC-7 (PDT)
- ZIP code: 96034
- Area code: 530
- FIPS code: 06-29252
- GNIS feature ID: 1656042

Gazelle is a census-designated place (CDP) in Siskiyou County, California, United States. Its population is 95 as of the 2020 census, up from 70 from the 2010 census.

== Name ==
The name, that of a small African antelope, was given to the post office in 1870. In the 1850s a steamer Gazelle plied the waters between San Francisco and the upper Sacramento River.

== Geography ==
Gazelle is located at 41°31′18″N 122°31′15″W (41.521538, -122.520718).

According to the United States Census Bureau, the CDP has a total area of 0.7 square miles (1.8 km^{2}), of which 99.90% is land and 0.10% is water.

== Demographics ==
Historical population
Census	Pop.	Note	%±
2000	136		—
2010	70		−48.5%
2020	95		35.7%
U.S. Decennial Census; 1860–1870 1880-1890; 1900 1910 1920; 1930 1940 1950; 1960 1970 1980; 1990 2000 2010

Gazelle first appeared as a census designated place in the 2000 U.S. census.

=== 2020 ===
The 2020 United States census reported that Gazelle had a population of 95. The population density was 141.4 inhabitants per square mile (54.6/km^{2}). The racial makeup of Gazelle was 81 (85.3%) White, 0 (0.0%) African American, 0 (0.0%) Native American, 1 (1.1%) Asian, 0 (0.0%) Pacific Islander, 0 (0.0%) from other races, and 13 (13.7%) from two or more races. Hispanic or Latino of any race were 7 persons (7.4%).

The whole population lived in households. There were 44 households, out of which 10 (22.7%) had children under the age of 18 living in them, 27 (61.4%) were married-couple households, 1 (2.3%) were cohabiting couple households, 10 (22.7%) had a female householder with no partner present, and 6 (13.6%) had a male householder with no partner present. 15 households (34.1%) were one person, and 10 (22.7%) were one person aged 65 or older. The average household size was 2.16. There were 29 families (65.9% of all households).

The age distribution was 20 people (21.1%) under the age of 18, 10 people (10.5%) aged 18 to 24, 21 people (22.1%) aged 25 to 44, 16 people (16.8%) aged 45 to 64, and 28 people (29.5%) who were 65 years of age or older. The median age was 42.6 years. There were 36 males and 59 females.

There were 57 housing units at an average density of 84.8 units per square mile (32.7 units/km^{2}), of which 44 (77.2%) were occupied. Of these, 40 (90.9%) were owner-occupied, and 4 (9.1%) were occupied by renters.

=== 2010 ===
The 2010 United States census reported that Gazelle had a population of 70. The population density was 120.5 inhabitants per square mile (46.5/km^{2}). The racial makeup of Gazelle was 65 (92.9%) White, 0 (0.0%) African American, 4 (5.7%) Native American, 0 (0.0%) Asian, 0 (0.0%) Pacific Islander, 1 (1.4%) from other races, and 0 (0.0%) from two or more races. Hispanic or Latino of any race were 5 persons (7.1%).

The Census reported that 70 people (100% of the population) lived in households, 0 (0%) lived in non-institutionalized group quarters, and 0 (0%) were institutionalized.

There were 37 households, out of which 4 (10.8%) had children under the age of 18 living in them, 15 (40.5%) were opposite-sex married couples living together, 1 (2.7%) had a female householder with no husband present, 4 (10.8%) had a male householder with no wife present. There were 1 (2.7%) unmarried opposite-sex partnerships, and 0 (0%) same-sex married couples or partnerships. 15 households (40.5%) were made up of individuals, and 7 (18.9%) had someone living alone who was 65 years of age or older. The average household size was 1.89. There were 20 families (54.1% of all households); the average family size was 2.45.

The population was spread out, with 8 people (11.4%) under the age of 18, 5 people (7.1%) aged 18 to 24, 11 people (15.7%) aged 25 to 44, 28 people (40.0%) aged 45 to 64, and 18 people (25.7%) who were 65 years of age or older. The median age was 53.7 years. For every 100 females, there were 112.1 males. For every 100 females age 18 and over, there were 113.8 males.

There were 49 housing units at an average density of 84.3 per square mile (32.5/km^{2}), of which 27 (73.0%) were owner-occupied, and 10 (27.0%) were occupied by renters. The homeowner vacancy rate was 3.6%; the rental vacancy rate was 35.3%. 44 people (62.9% of the population) lived in owner-occupied housing units and 26 people (37.1%) lived in rental housing units.

== Politics ==
In the state legislature Gazelle is in the 1st senatorial district, represented by Republican Megan Dahle, and the 1st Assembly district, represented by Republican Heather Hadwick.

Federally, Gazelle is in California's 1st congressional district, represented by Republican James Gallagher.
