= Mount Hebron, California =

Mt. Hebron
- Unincorporated Community; Census Designated Place
- Location in Siskiyou County and the state of California

- Location in the United States
- Coordinates: 41°47′11″N 122°0′18″W
- Country: United States of America
- State: California
- County: Siskiyou

Area
  - Total: 0.742 sq mi (1.922 km^{2})
  - Land: 0.742 sq mi (1.922 km^{2})
  - Water: 0 sq mi (0 km^{2}) 0%
- Elevation: 4,262 ft (1,299 m)

Population (2020)
  - Total: 103
  - Density: 139/sq mi (53.6/km^{2})
- Time zone: UTC-8 (Pacific (PST))
  - Summer (DST): UTC-7 (PDT)
- ZIP code: 96058
- Area code: 530
- FIPS code: 06-49768
- GNIS feature ID: 0263888

Mount Hebron is a census-designated place in Siskiyou County, California, United States. Its population is 103 as of the 2020 census, up from 95 from the 2010 census.

== Geography ==
Mount Hebron is located at 41°47′11″N 122°0′18″W (41.786373, −122.005132).

According to the United States Census Bureau, the CDP has a total area of 0.7 square mile (1.9 km^{2}), all land.

=== Climate ===
This region experiences warm (but not hot) and dry summers, with no average monthly temperatures above 71.6 °F. According to the Köppen Climate Classification system, Mount Hebron has a warm-summer Mediterranean climate, abbreviated "Csb" on climate maps.

== Demographics ==
Historical population
| Census | Pop. | Note | %± |
|---|---|---|---|
| 2000 | 92 | | — |
| 2010 | 95 | | 3.3% |
| 2020 | 103 | | 8.4% |
U.S. Decennial Census; 1860–1870 1880-1890; 1900 1910 1920; 1930 1940 1950; 1960 1970 1980; 1990 2000 2010

Mount Hebron first appeared as a census designated place in the 2000 U.S. census.

=== 2020 ===
The 2020 United States census reported that Mount Hebron had a population of 103. The population density was 138.8 inhabitants per square mile (53.6/km^{2}). The racial makeup of Mount Hebron was 37 (35.9%) White, 0 (0.0%) African American, 1 (1.0%) Native American, 0 (0.0%) Asian, 0 (0.0%) Pacific Islander, 36 (35.0%) from other races, and 29 (28.2%) from two or more races. Hispanic or Latino of any race were 74 persons (71.8%).

The whole population lived in households. There were 33 households, out of which 5 (15.2%) had children under the age of 18 living in them, 17 (51.5%) were married-couple households, 1 (3.0%) were cohabiting couple households, 4 (12.1%) had a female householder with no partner present, and 11 (33.3%) had a male householder with no partner present. 6 households (18.2%) were one person, and 2 (6.1%) were one person aged 65 or older. The average household size was 3.12. There were 24 families (72.7% of all households).

The age distribution was 18 people (17.5%) under the age of 18, 11 people (10.7%) aged 18 to 24, 25 people (24.3%) aged 25 to 44, 30 people (29.1%) aged 45 to 64, and 19 people (18.4%) who were 65 years of age or older. The median age was 43.8 years. There were 59 males and 44 females.

There were 40 housing units at an average density of 53.9 units per square mile (20.8 units/km^{2}), of which 33 (82.5%) were occupied. Of these, 16 (48.5%) were owner-occupied, and 17 (51.5%) were occupied by renters.

=== 2010 ===
The 2010 United States census reported that Mount Hebron had a population of 95. The population density was 133.2 inhabitants per square mile (51.4/km^{2}). The racial makeup of Mount Hebron was 73 (76.8%) White, 0 (0.0%) African American, 1 (1.1%) Native American, 0 (0.0%) Asian, 0 (0.0%) Pacific Islander, 18 (18.9%) from other races, and 3 (3.2%) from two or more races. Hispanic or Latino of any race were 41 persons (43.2%).

The Census reported that 93 people (97.9% of the population) lived in households, 2 (2.1%) lived in non-institutionalized group quarters, and 0 (0%) were institutionalized.

There were 32 households, out of which 11 (34.4%) had children under the age of 18 living in them, 16 (50.0%) were opposite-sex married couples living together, 3 (9.4%) had a female householder with no husband present, 1 (3.1%) had a male householder with no wife present. There were 0 (0%) unmarried opposite-sex partnerships, and 0 (0%) same-sex married couples or partnerships. 11 households (34.4%) were made up of individuals, and 8 (25.0%) had someone living alone who was 65 years of age or older. The average household size was 2.91. There were 20 families (62.5% of all households); the average family size was 3.30.

The population was spread out, with 17 people (17.9%) under the age of 18, 8 people (8.4%) aged 18 to 24, 29 people (30.5%) aged 25 to 44, 25 people (26.3%) aged 45 to 64, and 16 people (16.8%) who were 65 years of age or older. The median age was 42.3 years. For every 100 females, there were 131.7 males. For every 100 females age 18 and over, there were 151.6 males.

There were 43 housing units at an average density of 60.3 per square mile (23.3/km^{2}), of which 24 (75.0%) were owner-occupied, and 8 (25.0%) were occupied by renters. The homeowner vacancy rate was 0%; the rental vacancy rate was 27.3%. 52 people (54.7% of the population) lived in owner-occupied housing units and 41 people (43.2%) lived in rental housing units.

=== 2000 ===
As of the census of 2000, the median income for a household in the CDP was $22,188, and the median income for a family was $25,625. Males had a median income of $31,250 versus $11,250 for females. The per capita income for the CDP was $16,556. There were 10.5% of families and 22.5% of the population living below the poverty line, including 18.2% of under eighteens and 33.3% of those over 64.

== Politics ==
In the state legislature Mount Hebron is in the 1st senatorial district, represented by Republican Megan Dahle, and the 1st Assembly district, represented by Republican Heather Hadwick.

Federally, Mount Hebron is in California's 1st congressional district, represented by Republican James Gallagher.
