= Big Springs Union Elementary School District =

School district in California, United States

Big Springs Elementary School District

Location
- 7405 Highway A-12; Montague, California 96064 United States

Students and staff
- District mascot: Badgers

Other information
- Website: www.bigspringsschool.org

Big Springs Elementary School District is a public school district based in Siskiyou County, California, United States. It operates Big Springs Elementary School in Montague, California, with an enrollment of 112 students in the 2006–2007 school year.
