= Montague Airport (California) =

Montague Airport-Yreka Rohrer Field Montague Air Force Auxiliary Field
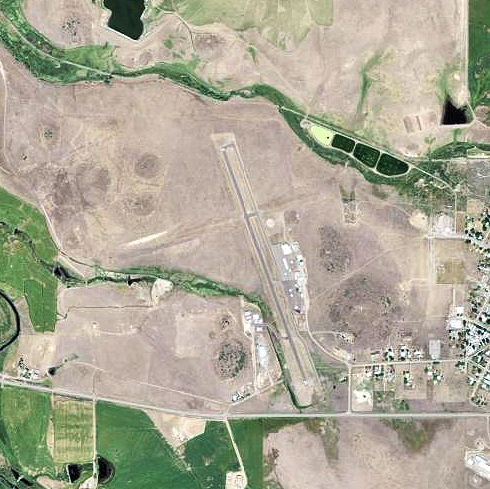
- 2006 USGS photo
- IATA: ROF; ICAO: none; FAA LID: 1O5

Summary
- Airport type: Public
- Owner: City of Montague, California
- Location: Montague, California
- Elevation AMSL: 2,527 ft / 770 m
- Coordinates: 41°43′49″N 122°32′44″W

Map
- Location of Montague Airport

Runways
Direction	Length		Surface
Direction	ft	m	Surface
14/32	3,360	1,024	Asphalt
05/23	2,080	634	Grass

The Montague Airport (IATA: ROF), also known as Yreka Rohrer Field (IATA: ROF, FAA LID: 1O5), is located on the west side of Montague, California, United States. It is owned by the city of Montague.

== History ==
The municipal airport at Montague was created at its present location in 1928. The maintenance hangar and a small weather observatory building were built in 1928. Civilian Conservation Corps funds helped to bring in large quantities of gravel to stabilize the landing area in the early 1930s. Originally the airport was only a north–south dirt strip. A crosswind runway was added in the 1930s. A small amount of paving was added to the south end of the original strip in the 1950s to accommodate drag racing by automobiles, not aircraft.

During World War II, the airport was designated as Montague Air Force Auxiliary Field and was an auxiliary training airfield for Hamilton Field, California.

The airport returned to civil control in 1945 after the war. The last major improvement consisted of lengthening the runway by 600 feet to its present 3,360 feet in 1982.

== See also ==
- Siskiyou County Airport, also located in Montague
- California World War II Army Airfields
