= Tennant, California =

Tennant
- Unincorporated Community; Census Designated Place
- Location in Siskiyou County and the state of California

- Location in the United States
- Coordinates: 41°35′6″N 121°54′42″W
- Country: United States of America
- State: California
- County: Siskiyou

Area
  - Total: 0.340 sq mi (0.880 km^{2})
  - Land: 0.339 sq mi (0.879 km^{2})
  - Water: 0.00039 sq mi (0.001 km^{2}) 0.14%
- Elevation: 4,797 ft (1,462 m)

Population (2020)
  - Total: 63
  - Density: 190/sq mi (72/km^{2})
- Time zone: UTC-8 (Pacific (PST))
  - Summer (DST): UTC-7 (PDT)
- ZIP code: 96012
- Area code: 530
- FIPS code: 06-78176
- GNIS feature ID: 1659968

Tennant is a census-designated place (CDP) in Siskiyou County, California, United States. Its population is 63 as of the 2020 census, up from 41 from the 2010 census.

== History ==
The town was founded in 1921, and named after John Tennant, an official for the Long Bell Lumber logging company, which ran logging operations in the area until the 1950s. At its peak, Tennant had over 1,000 residents in summer, and boasted a hotel, pool hall, barber shop, hospital, store, and maintenance facilities for six logging locomotives used to carry timber between the forests and the large sawmill at Weed. Long Bell ended operations at Tennant in 1955 and donated the townsite to the Veterans of Foreign Wars, who then sold it to investors who unsuccessfully attempted to turn it into an artist colony. By 1962 the entire town was owned by one individual, Clarence Bullock, who intended to make Tennant a retirement community and who credited the cool, dry, sunny climate with restoring his health. The earliest residents of Tennant held regular reunions until 1978, and since then Tennant has been mostly occupied by retirees and those drawn to the area's rural isolation.

== Geography ==
Tennant is located at 41°35′6″N 121°54′42″W (41.585003, -121.911794).

According to the United States Census Bureau, the CDP has a total area of 0.3 square miles (0.78 km^{2}), of which 99.86% is land and 0.14% is water.

=== Climate ===
This region experiences warm (but not hot) and dry summers, with no average monthly temperatures above 71.6 °F. According to the Köppen Climate Classification system, Tennant has a warm-summer Mediterranean climate, abbreviated "Csb" on climate maps.

== Demographics ==
Historical population
Census	Pop.	Note	%±
2000	63		—
2010	41		−34.9%
2020	63		53.7%
U.S. Decennial Census; 1860–1870 1880-1890; 1900 1910 1920; 1930 1940 1950; 1960 1970 1980; 1990 2000 2010

Tennant first appeared as a census designated place in the 2000 U.S. census.

The 2020 United States census reported that Tennant had a population of 63. The population density was 185.8 inhabitants per square mile (71.7/km^{2}). The racial makeup of Tennant was 56 (89%) White and 7 (11%) from two or more races. Hispanic or Latino of any race were 5 persons (8%).

There were 40 households, of which 15 (38%) were families and 24 (60%) were one person living alone. The median age was 62.5 years.

There were 97 housing units at an average density of 286.1 units per square mile (110.5 units/km^{2}), of which 40 (41%) were occupied and 54 (56%) were used seasonally. Of the occupied housing units, 35 were owner-occupied, and 5 were occupied by renters.

As of the census of 2000, the median income for a household in the CDP was $10,750, and the median income for a family was $26,250. Males had a median income of $21,250 versus $0 for females. The per capita income for the CDP was $9,929. There were 31.3% of families and 34.8% of the population living below the poverty line, including 100.0% of under eighteens and 8.3% of those over 64.

100% of the population speaks English.

== Politics ==
In the state legislature Tennant is in the 1st senatorial district, represented by Republican Megan Dahle, and the 1st Assembly district, represented by Republican Heather Hadwick.

Federally, Tennant is in California's 1st congressional district, represented by Republican James Gallagher.
