= Montague, California =

City in California, United States

- City
- City of Montague
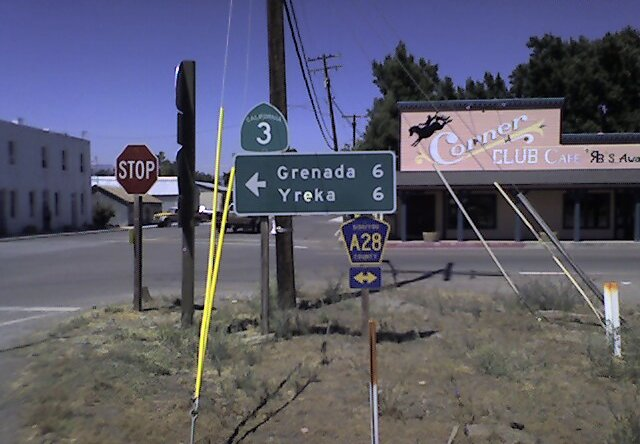
- Junction of CA-3 and CR A28
- Interactive map of Montague, California
- Location in the United States
- Coordinates: 41°43′38″N 122°31′35″W
- Country: United States
- State: California
- County: Siskiyou
- Incorporated: January 28, 1909
- Named for: S. S. Montague

Area
  - Total: 1.79 sq mi (4.64 km^{2})
  - Land: 1.78 sq mi (4.60 km^{2})
  - Water: 0.015 sq mi (0.04 km^{2}) 0.85%
- Elevation: 2,539 ft (774 m)

Population (2020)
  - Total: 1,226
  - Density: 786.4/sq mi (303.62/km^{2})
- Time zone: UTC−8 (Pacific Time Zone)
  - Summer (DST): UTC−7 (PDT)
- ZIP code: 96064
- Area code: 530
- FIPS code: 06-48690
- GNIS feature IDs: 277557, 2411140
- Website: cityofmontagueca.com

Montague is a city in Siskiyou County, California, United States. Its population is 1,226 as of the 2020 census, down from 1,443 from the 2010 census.

== Name ==
When the Southern Pacific Railroad extension was built from Dunsmuir, California to the state line in 1886–87, the station was named for S.S. Montague, chief engineer of the Central Pacific Railroad.

== Geography ==
Montague is located at 41°43′38″N 122°31′35″W (41.727168, -122.526468).

According to the United States Census Bureau, the city has a total area of 1.8 square miles (4.6 km^{2}), of which 99.15% is land and 0.85% is water.

Located six miles (9.7 km) east of Interstate 5 at Yreka along California State Route 3, this is also the site of the interchange between the Yreka Western Railroad and the Central Oregon and Pacific Railroad. General aviation is served at Montague Airport, which also serves Yreka.

=== Climate ===
Montague has a Mediterranean climate closely bordering on a steppe climate, very unusual for its location west of the Cascade Crest. Montague and the Shasta Valley are located in a rain shadow created by the Klamath Mountains, giving the area a climate and vegetation type more similar to points east of the Cascades, with average annual precipitation similar to Bend, Oregon. Rainfall is nonexistent in summer, except for the very occasional thunderstorm. The area experiences cool to cold winters with somewhat frequent snowfall, and hot summers with large diurnal temperature variation and nearly constant sunshine.

Climate data for Montague - Siskiyou County Airport (2001–2019)
| Month | Jan | Feb | Mar | Apr | May | Jun | Jul | Aug | Sep | Oct | Nov | Dec | Year |
|---|---|---|---|---|---|---|---|---|---|---|---|---|---|
| Record high °C (°F) | 65 (18) | 71 (22) | 78 (26) | 90 (32) | 98 (37) | 109 (43) | 111 (44) | 107 (42) | 102 (39) | 92 (33) | 76 (24) | 61 (16) | 111 (44) |
| Mean daily maximum °C (°F) | 45.9 (7.7) | 51.0 (10.6) | 57.0 (13.9) | 62.5 (16.9) | 73.2 (22.9) | 82.4 (28.0) | 93.2 (34.0) | 91.2 (32.9) | 83.1 (28.4) | 68.3 (20.2) | 53.4 (11.9) | 44.5 (6.9) | 67.1 (19.5) |
| Daily mean °C (°F) | 36 (2) | 39 (4) | 44 (7) | 49 (9) | 56 (13) | 64 (18) | 73 (23) | 71 (22) | 64 (18) | 53 (12) | 41 (5) | 35 (2) | 52 (11) |
| Mean daily minimum °C (°F) | 25.9 (−3.4) | 26.8 (−2.9) | 30.5 (−0.8) | 33.8 (1.0) | 40.6 (4.8) | 47.4 (8.6) | 55.1 (12.8) | 52.7 (11.5) | 44.9 (7.2) | 35.9 (2.2) | 29.3 (−1.5) | 26.0 (−3.3) | 37.4 (3.0) |
| Record low °C (°F) | −14 (−26) | 9 (−13) | 11 (−12) | 15 (−9) | 19 (−7) | 31 (−1) | 40 (4) | 37 (3) | 28 (−2) | 12 (−11) | 8 (−13) | −9 (−23) | −14 (−26) |
| Average precipitation mm (inches) | 1.44 (37) | 1.36 (35) | 1.33 (34) | 1.08 (27) | 0.95 (24) | 0.48 (12) | 0.20 (5.1) | 0.15 (3.8) | 0.25 (6.4) | 0.96 (24) | 1.46 (37) | 2.38 (60) | 12.04 (305.3) |
| Average precipitation days (≥ 1.0 mm) | 7 | 6 | 7 | 6 | 5 | 2 | 1 | 1 | 1 | 3 | 6 | 8 | 53 |
| Average relative humidity (%) | 76 | 68 | 63 | 58 | 53 | 46 | 40 | 38 | 40 | 54 | 72 | 77 | 57 |
| Average dew point °C (°F) | 28 (−2) | 29 (−2) | 31 (−1) | 33 (1) | 38 (3) | 41 (5) | 45 (7) | 42 (6) | 37 (3) | 34 (1) | 32 (0) | 28 (−2) | 35 (2) |
Source 1: NOAA
Source 2: timeanddate.com (mean temperatures, humidity, and dew point)

== Demographics ==
Historical population
| Census | Pop. | Note | %± |
|---|---|---|---|
| 1890 | 250 | | — |
| 1910 | 274 | | — |
| 1920 | 453 | | 65.3% |
| 1930 | 507 | | 11.9% |
| 1940 | 463 | | −8.7% |
| 1950 | 579 | | 25.1% |
| 1960 | 782 | | 35.1% |
| 1970 | 890 | | 13.8% |
| 1980 | 1,285 | | 44.4% |
| 1990 | 1,415 | | 10.1% |
| 2000 | 1,456 | | 2.9% |
| 2010 | 1,443 | | −0.9% |
| 2020 | 1,226 | | −15.0% |
U.S. Decennial Census

=== 2020 census ===
As of the 2020 census, Montague had a population of 1,226. The population density was 689.5 inhabitants per square mile (266.2/km^{2}). The median age was 41.6 years. The age distribution was 251 people (20.5%) under the age of 18, 104 people (8.5%) aged 18 to 24, 290 people (23.7%) aged 25 to 44, 324 people (26.4%) aged 45 to 64, and 257 people (21.0%) who were 65 years of age or older. For every 100 females, there were 90.7 males, and for every 100 females age 18 and over there were 87.5 males age 18 and over.

Racial composition as of the 2020 census
| Race | Number | Percent |
|---|---|---|
| White | 1,002 | 81.7% |
| Black or African American | 8 | 0.7% |
| American Indian and Alaska Native | 50 | 4.1% |
| Asian | 4 | 0.3% |
| Native Hawaiian and Other Pacific Islander | 0 | 0.0% |
| Some other race | 23 | 1.9% |
| Two or more races | 139 | 11.3% |
| Hispanic or Latino (of any race) | 135 | 11.0% |

The census reported that 1,212 people (98.9% of the population) lived in households, 14 (1.1%) lived in non-institutionalized group quarters, and no one was institutionalized. There were 518 households, out of which 168 (32.4%) had children under the age of 18 living in them, 215 (41.5%) were married-couple households, 53 (10.2%) were cohabiting couple households, 166 (32.0%) had a female householder with no spouse or partner present, and 84 (16.2%) had a male householder with no spouse or partner present. 141 households (27.2%) were one person, and 80 (15.4%) were one person aged 65 or older. The average household size was 2.34. There were 337 families (65.1% of all households).

There were 569 housing units at an average density of 320.0 units per square mile (123.6 units/km^{2}), of which 518 (91.0%) were occupied and 51 (9.0%) were vacant. Of the occupied units, 345 (66.6%) were owner-occupied, and 173 (33.4%) were occupied by renters. The homeowner vacancy rate was 0.0% and the rental vacancy rate was 6.0%. 0.0% of residents lived in urban areas, while 100.0% lived in rural areas.

=== Income and poverty ===
In 2023, the US Census Bureau estimated that the median household income was $55,096, and the per capita income was $23,842. About 24.5% of families and 25.8% of the population were below the poverty line.

=== 2010 census ===
At the 2010 census Montague had a population of 1,443. The population density was 804.8 inhabitants per square mile (310.7/km^{2}). The racial makeup of Montague was 1,251 (86.7%) White, 4 (0.3%) African American, 67 (4.6%) Native American, 8 (0.6%) Asian, 1 (0.1%) Pacific Islander, 17 (1.2%) from other races, and 95 (6.6%) from two or more races. Hispanic or Latino of any race were 107 people (7.4%).

The census reported that 1,425 people (98.8% of the population) lived in households, 18 (1.2%) lived in non-institutionalized group quarters, and no one was institutionalized.

There were 576 households, 198 (34.4%) had children under the age of 18 living in them, 255 (44.3%) were opposite-sex married couples living together, 86 (14.9%) had a female householder with no husband present, 31 (5.4%) had a male householder with no wife present. There were 64 (11.1%) unmarried opposite-sex partnerships, and 1 (0.2%) same-sex married couples or partnerships. 159 households (27.6%) were one person and 49 (8.5%) had someone living alone who was 65 or older. The average household size was 2.47. There were 372 families (64.6% of households); the average family size was 2.95.

The age distribution was 368 people (25.5%) under the age of 18, 119 people (8.2%) aged 18 to 24, 382 people (26.5%) aged 25 to 44, 390 people (27.0%) aged 45 to 64, and 184 people (12.8%) who were 65 or older. The median age was 37.9 years. For every 100 females, there were 95.3 males. For every 100 females age 18 and over, there were 96.2 males.

There were 633 housing units at an average density of 353.0 per square mile, of the occupied units 371 (64.4%) were owner-occupied and 205 (35.6%) were rented. The homeowner vacancy rate was 2.4%; the rental vacancy rate was 10.4%. 886 people (61.4% of the population) lived in owner-occupied housing units and 539 people (37.4%) lived in rental housing units.

== Government ==
In the California State Legislature, Montague is in the 1st senatorial district, represented by Republican Megan Dahle, and the 1st Assembly district, represented by Republican Heather Hadwick.

In the United States House of Representatives, Montague is in California's 1st congressional district, represented by Republican James Gallagher.

== Education ==
Montague is home of the Big Springs Union Elementary School District.
