= Negro Flat, Siskiyou County, California =

Coordinates: 41°14′31″N 123°16′51″W

Negro Flat was a placer gold mining camp on the Salmon River, now located in Siskiyou County, California, United States. It was located originally in Trinity County, in 1850.

== History ==
Negro Flat was one of the largest gold producers in Trinity County in 1850, along with Gullion's Bar, Bestville, and Sawyers Bar. In 1851, it became part of Klamath County. In 1874, its site became part of Siskiyou County, when Klamath County was finally abolished and divided between Siskiyou and Humboldt counties.

== See also ==
- List of ghost towns in California
