= Municipal Airport =

A municipal airport is an airport owned by a city or municipality. It may refer to:

- Municipal Airport (Missouri), Unionville, Missouri, United States (FAA: K43)
- Municipal Airport (Oklahoma), Texhoma, Oklahoma, United States (FAA: K49)
- Municipal Airport, San Bernardino, former name of Norton Air Force Base

== See also ==
- Covington Municipal Airport (disambiguation)
