= Hamburg, California =

Unincorporated community in California, United States

- Unincorporated community
- Location within California Location within the United States
- Coordinates: 41°46′58″N 123°03′37″W
- Country: United States
- State: California
- County: Siskiyou
- Elevation: 1,617 ft (493 m)

Population (2019)
  - Total: 80
- Time zone: UTC-8 (Pacific (PST))
  - Summer (DST): UTC-7 (PDT)
- Area code: 530
- GNIS feature ID: 261041

Hamburg (formerly Hamburg Bar) is an unincorporated community in Siskiyou County, California, United States. The community is located along the Klamath River and California State Route 96, 22 miles (35 km) west of Yreka, just downstream from the confluence of the Scott and Klamath Rivers.

Hamburg was an important mining town in the 1850s, with several businesses, including saloons and stores. A few private residences remain in the area today.
