= Bestville, California =

Ghost town in California, United States

Bestville is a former settlement on the North Fork Salmon River in Siskiyou County, California, United States, just downstream from Sawyers Bar. Bestville is located at 41.3007°N 123.1431°W.

== History ==
Bestville, now in Siskiyou County, was a California Gold Rush mining camp, established in 1850. It was named for its founder, Captain John Best. In 1854, Bestville was said to have a saloon and bowling alley; nothing remains today.

== See also ==
- List of ghost towns in California
