= Callahan, California =

Unincorporated community in California, United States

- Unincorporated community
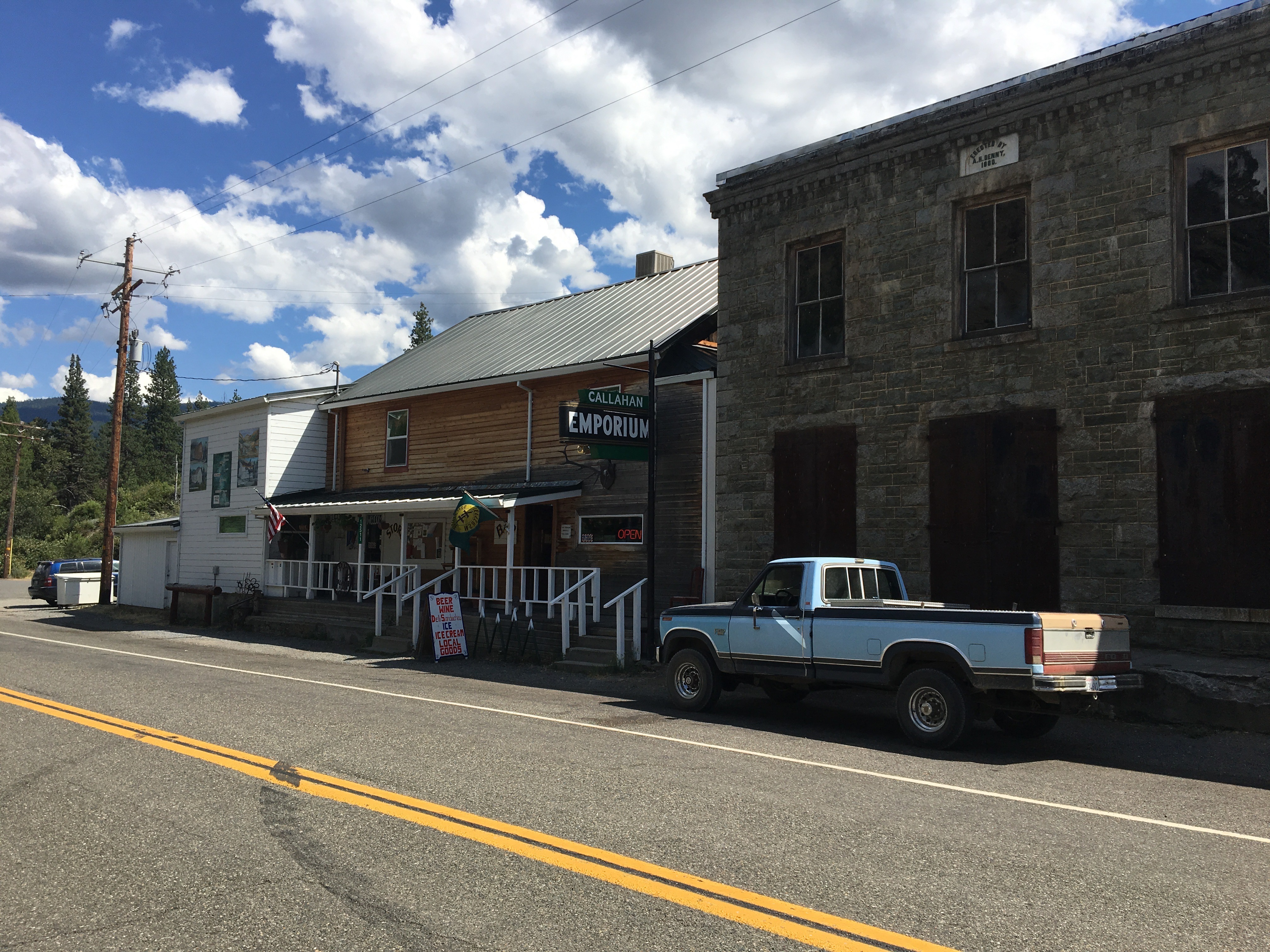
- The convenience store and bar in Callahan

- Location within California Location within the United States
- Coordinates: 41°18′35″N 122°48′05″W
- Country: United States
- State: California
- County: Siskiyou
- Elevation: 3,140 ft (960 m)
- Time zone: UTC-8 (Pacific (PST))
  - Summer (DST): UTC-7 (PDT)
- ZIP code: 96014
- Area code: 530
- GNIS feature ID: 257834

Callahan is an unincorporated community in Siskiyou County, California, United States. Callahan is located on California State Route 3, 11.5 miles (18.5 km) south-southeast of Etna. Callahan has a post office with ZIP code 96014. As of 2009 it has a population of 50~.

== History ==
The post office opened as Callahan's Ranch in 1858 and changed its name to Callahan in 1892. The community was named after M.B. Callahan, who opened a travelers' stop in the community in 1851. During the Civil War the local butcher shop raised a Palmetto flag to show support for the rebels but it was soon hauled down with 2 townspeople heckling the owner about it.

== Climate ==
This region experiences warm (but not hot) and dry summers, with no average monthly temperatures above 71.6 °F. According to the Köppen Climate Classification system, Callahan has a warm-summer Mediterranean climate, abbreviated "Csb" on climate maps.

Climate data for Callahan (1991–2020 normals, extremes 1953–2018)
Month	Jan	Feb	Mar	Apr	May	Jun	Jul	Aug	Sep	Oct	Nov	Dec	Year
Record high °F (°C)	65 (18)	72 (22)	82 (28)	86 (30)	98 (37)	103 (39)	106 (41)	105 (41)	105 (41)	91 (33)	75 (24)	65 (18)	106 (41)
Mean daily maximum °F (°C)	47.6 (8.7)	52.7 (11.5)	58.7 (14.8)	64.5 (18.1)	73.0 (22.8)	81.1 (27.3)	90.0 (32.2)	89.0 (31.7)	82.6 (28.1)	69.5 (20.8)	54.1 (12.3)	46.0 (7.8)	67.4 (19.7)
Daily mean °F (°C)	37.7 (3.2)	41.2 (5.1)	45.4 (7.4)	49.8 (9.9)	56.6 (13.7)	63.0 (17.2)	70.4 (21.3)	69.0 (20.6)	63.0 (17.2)	53.0 (11.7)	42.7 (5.9)	36.8 (2.7)	52.4 (11.3)
Mean daily minimum °F (°C)	27.7 (−2.4)	29.7 (−1.3)	32.1 (0.1)	35.1 (1.7)	40.3 (4.6)	44.9 (7.2)	50.7 (10.4)	49.0 (9.4)	43.3 (6.3)	36.4 (2.4)	31.4 (−0.3)	27.6 (−2.4)	37.4 (3.0)
Record low °F (°C)	−6 (−21)	−1 (−18)	4 (−16)	18 (−8)	21 (−6)	21 (−6)	29 (−2)	32 (0)	23 (−5)	15 (−9)	9 (−13)	−9 (−23)	−9 (−23)
Average precipitation inches (mm)	3.48 (88)	2.80 (71)	2.38 (60)	1.37 (35)	1.55 (39)	0.69 (18)	0.47 (12)	0.29 (7.4)	0.38 (9.7)	1.34 (34)	2.27 (58)	3.75 (95)	20.77 (528)
Average snowfall inches (cm)	0.4 (1.0)	0.0 (0.0)	1.1 (2.8)	0.3 (0.76)	0.0 (0.0)	0.0 (0.0)	0.0 (0.0)	0.0 (0.0)	0.0 (0.0)	0.0 (0.0)	1.1 (2.8)	1.5 (3.8)	4.4 (11)
Average precipitation days (≥ 0.01 in)	13.1	11.3	12.7	10.0	8.4	4.3	2.5	1.7	2.2	5.6	10.8	13.4	96.0
Average snowy days (≥ 0.1 in)	0.1	0.0	0.4	0.1	0.0	0.0	0.0	0.0	0.0	0.0	0.3	0.2	1.1
Source 1: NOAA
Source 2: WRCC (extremes)
