= Greenview, California =

- Unincorporated Community; Census Designated Place
- Location in Siskiyou County and the state of California

- Location in the United States
- Coordinates: 41°32′58″N 122°55′14″W
- Country: United States of America
- State: California
- County: Siskiyou

Area
  - Total: 1.380 sq mi (3.573 km^{2})
  - Land: 1.295 sq mi (3.354 km^{2})
  - Water: 0.085 sq mi (0.219 km^{2}) 6.12%
- Elevation: 2,812 ft (857 m)

Population (2020)
  - Total: 208
  - Density: 161/sq mi (62.0/km^{2})
- Time zone: UTC-8 (Pacific (PST))
  - Summer (DST): UTC-7 (PDT)
- ZIP code: 96037
- Area code: 530
- FIPS code: 06-31134
- GNIS feature ID: 0260875

Greenview is a census-designated place (CDP) in Siskiyou County, California, United States. Its population is 208 as of the 2020 census, up from 201 from the 2010 census.

== Geography ==
Greenview is located at 41°32′58″N 122°55′14″W (41.549515, -122.920420).

According to the United States Census Bureau, the CDP has a total area of 1.4 square miles (3.6 km^{2}), of which 93.88% is land and 6.12% is water.

=== Climate ===
This region experiences warm (but not hot) and dry summers, with no average monthly temperatures above 71.6 °F. According to the Köppen Climate Classification system, Greenview has a warm-summer Mediterranean climate, abbreviated "Csb" on climate maps.

== Demographics ==
Historical population
Census	Pop.	Note	%±
2000	200		—
2010	201		0.5%
2020	208		3.5%
U.S. Decennial Census; 1860–1870 1880-1890; 1900 1910 1920; 1930 1940 1950; 1960 1970 1980; 1990 2000 2010

Greenview first appeared as a census designated place in the 2000 U.S. census.

=== 2020 ===
The 2020 United States census reported that Greenview had a population of 208. The population density was 160.6 inhabitants per square mile (62.0/km^{2}). The racial makeup of Greenview was 162 (77.9%) White, 1 (0.5%) African American, 7 (3.4%) Native American, 1 (0.5%) Asian, 0 (0.0%) Pacific Islander, 7 (3.4%) from other races, and 30 (14.4%) from two or more races. Hispanic or Latino of any race were 22 persons (10.6%).

The whole population lived in households. There were 82 households, out of which 9 (11.0%) had children under the age of 18 living in them, 45 (54.9%) were married-couple households, 4 (4.9%) were cohabiting couple households, 12 (14.6%) had a female householder with no partner present, and 21 (25.6%) had a male householder with no partner present. 30 households (36.6%) were one person, and 17 (20.7%) were one person aged 65 or older. The average household size was 2.54. There were 47 families (57.3% of all households).

The age distribution was 50 people (24.0%) under the age of 18, 4 people (1.9%) aged 18 to 24, 30 people (14.4%) aged 25 to 44, 58 people (27.9%) aged 45 to 64, and 66 people (31.7%) who were 65 years of age or older. The median age was 51.0 years. For every 100 females, there were 82.5 males.

There were 98 housing units at an average density of 75.7 units per square mile (29.2 units/km^{2}), of which 82 (83.7%) were occupied. Of these, 71 (86.6%) were owner-occupied, and 11 (13.4%) were occupied by renters.

=== 2010 ===
The 2010 United States census reported that Greenview had a population of 201. The population density was 145.7 inhabitants per square mile (56.3/km^{2}). The racial makeup of Greenview was 161 (80.1%) White, 0 (0.0%) African American, 10 (5.0%) Native American, 1 (0.5%) Asian, 0 (0.0%) Pacific Islander, 8 (4.0%) from other races, and 21 (10.4%) from two or more races. Hispanic or Latino of any race were 19 persons (9.5%).

The Census reported that 201 people (100% of the population) lived in households, 0 (0%) lived in non-institutionalized group quarters, and 0 (0%) were institutionalized.

There were 88 households, out of which 18 (20.5%) had children under the age of 18 living in them, 51 (58.0%) were opposite-sex married couples living together, 8 (9.1%) had a female householder with no husband present, 3 (3.4%) had a male householder with no wife present. There were 4 (4.5%) unmarried opposite-sex partnerships, and 1 (1.1%) same-sex married couples or partnerships. 21 households (23.9%) were made up of individuals, and 9 (10.2%) had someone living alone who was 65 years of age or older. The average household size was 2.28. There were 62 families (70.5% of all households); the average family size was 2.65.

The population was spread out, with 32 people (15.9%) under the age of 18, 13 people (6.5%) aged 18 to 24, 37 people (18.4%) aged 25 to 44, 80 people (39.8%) aged 45 to 64, and 39 people (19.4%) who were 65 years of age or older. The median age was 52.6 years. For every 100 females, there were 97.1 males. For every 100 females age 18 and over, there were 94.3 males.

There were 100 housing units at an average density of 72.5 per square mile (28.0/km^{2}), of which 65 (73.9%) were owner-occupied, and 23 (26.1%) were occupied by renters. The homeowner vacancy rate was 1.5%; the rental vacancy rate was 4.0%. 155 people (77.1% of the population) lived in owner-occupied housing units and 46 people (22.9%) lived in rental housing units.

== Politics ==
In the state legislature Greenview is in the 1st senatorial district, represented by Republican Megan Dahle, and the 1st Assembly district, represented by Republican Heather Hadwick.

Federally, Greenview is in California's 1st congressional district, represented by Republican James Gallagher.
