= Siskiyou County, California =

County in California, United States

Siskiyou County
- County
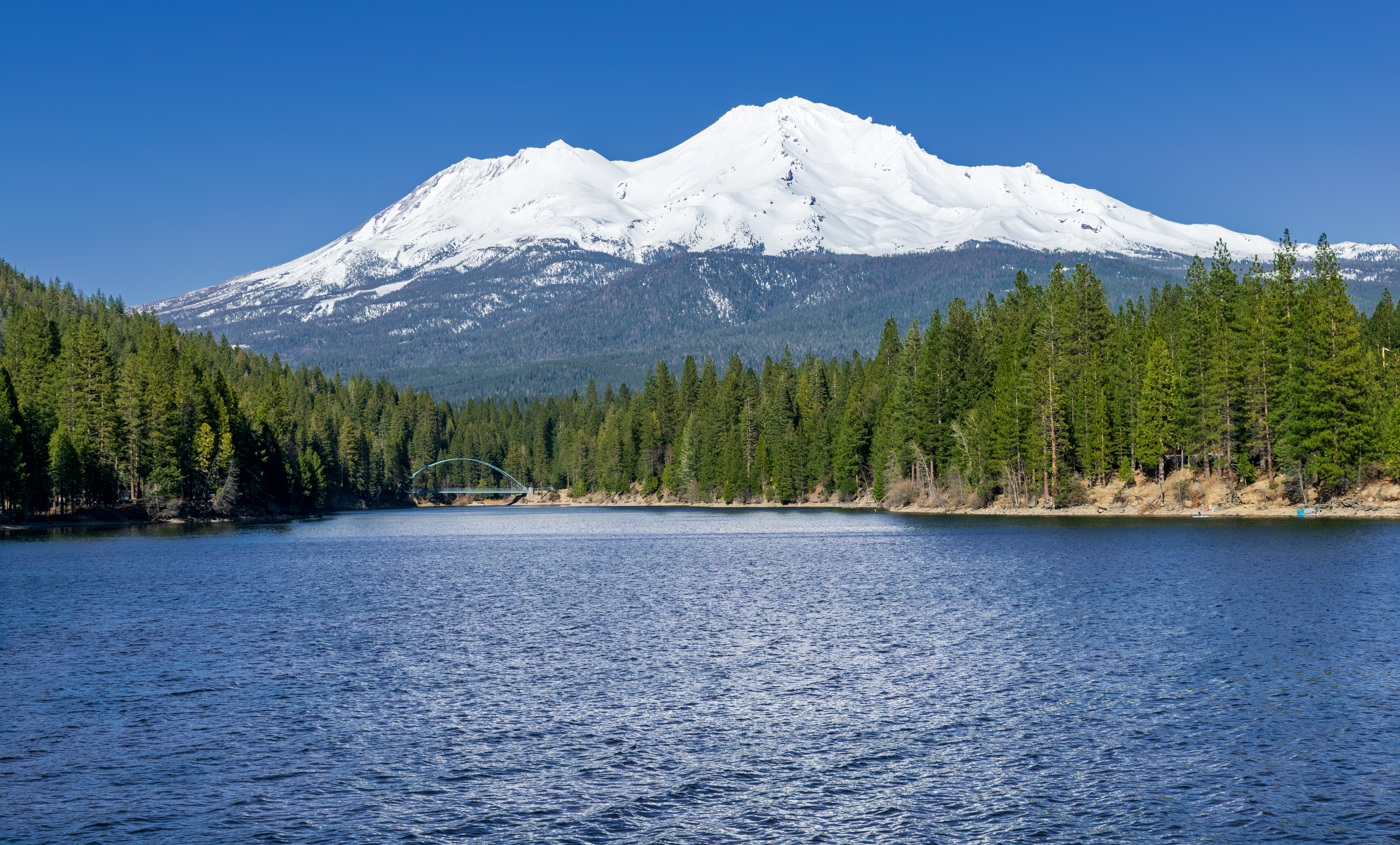
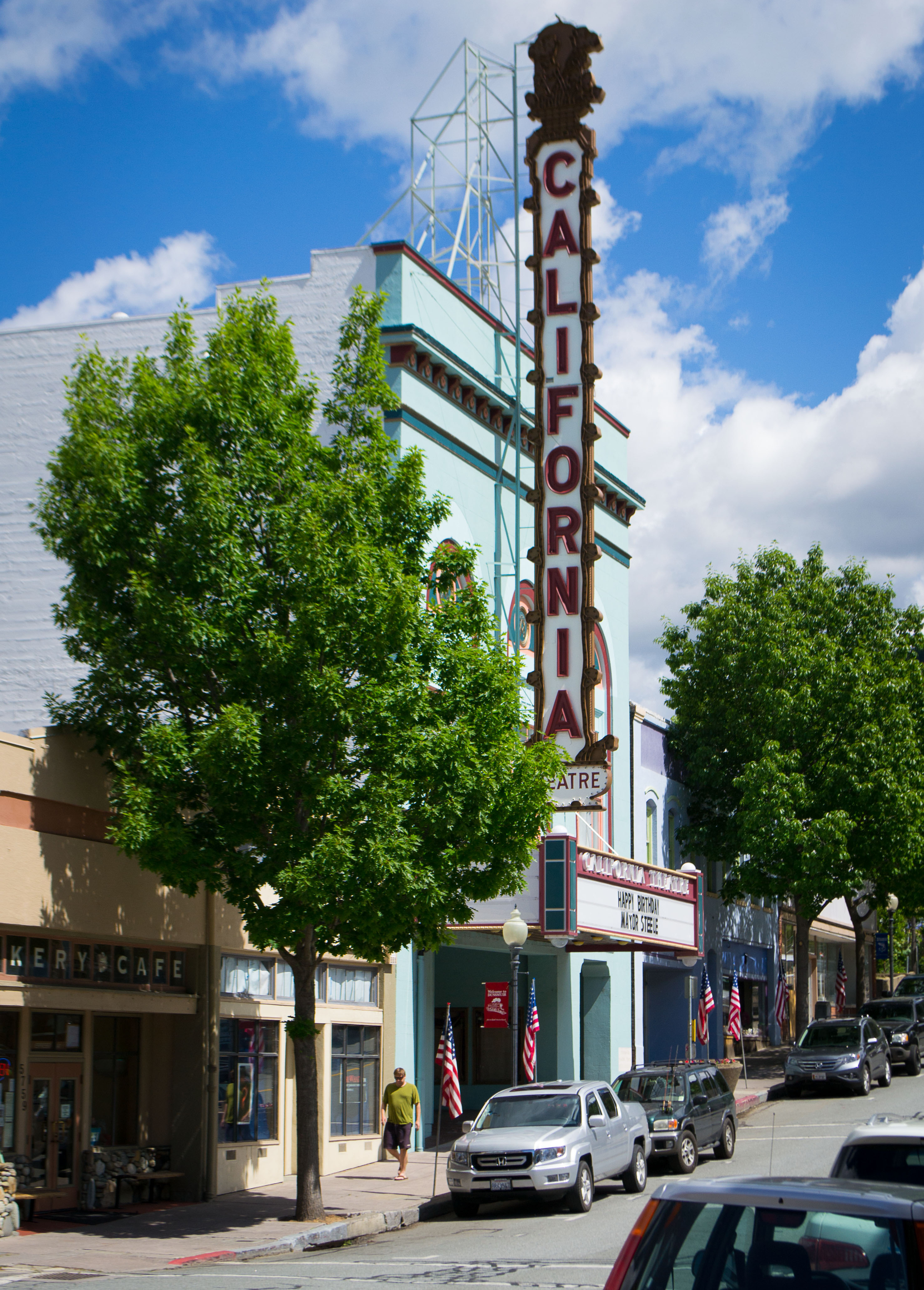
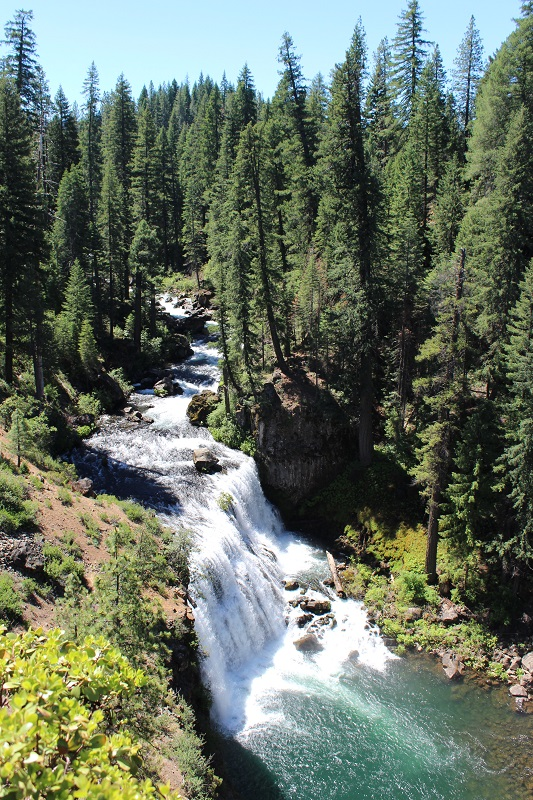
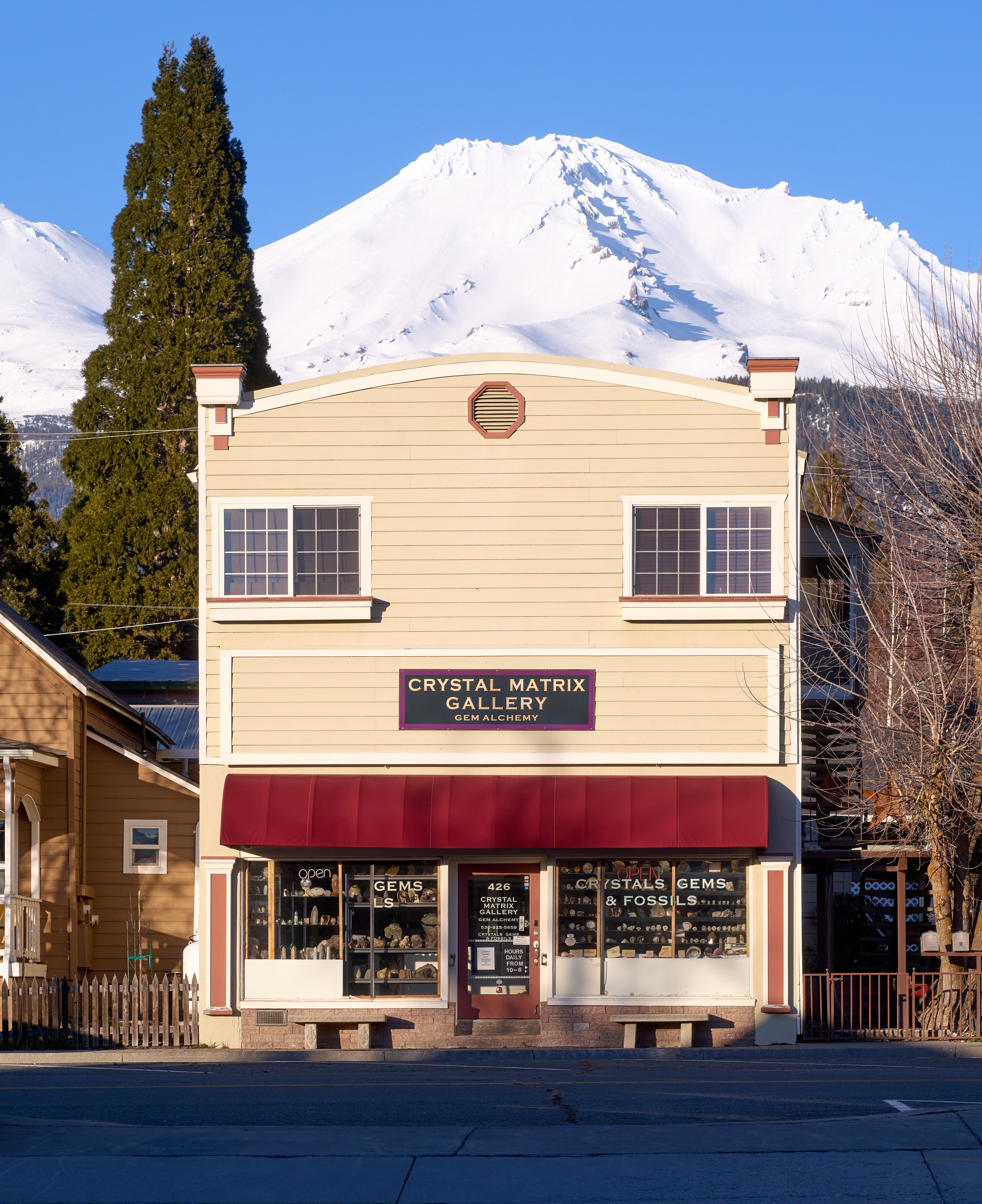
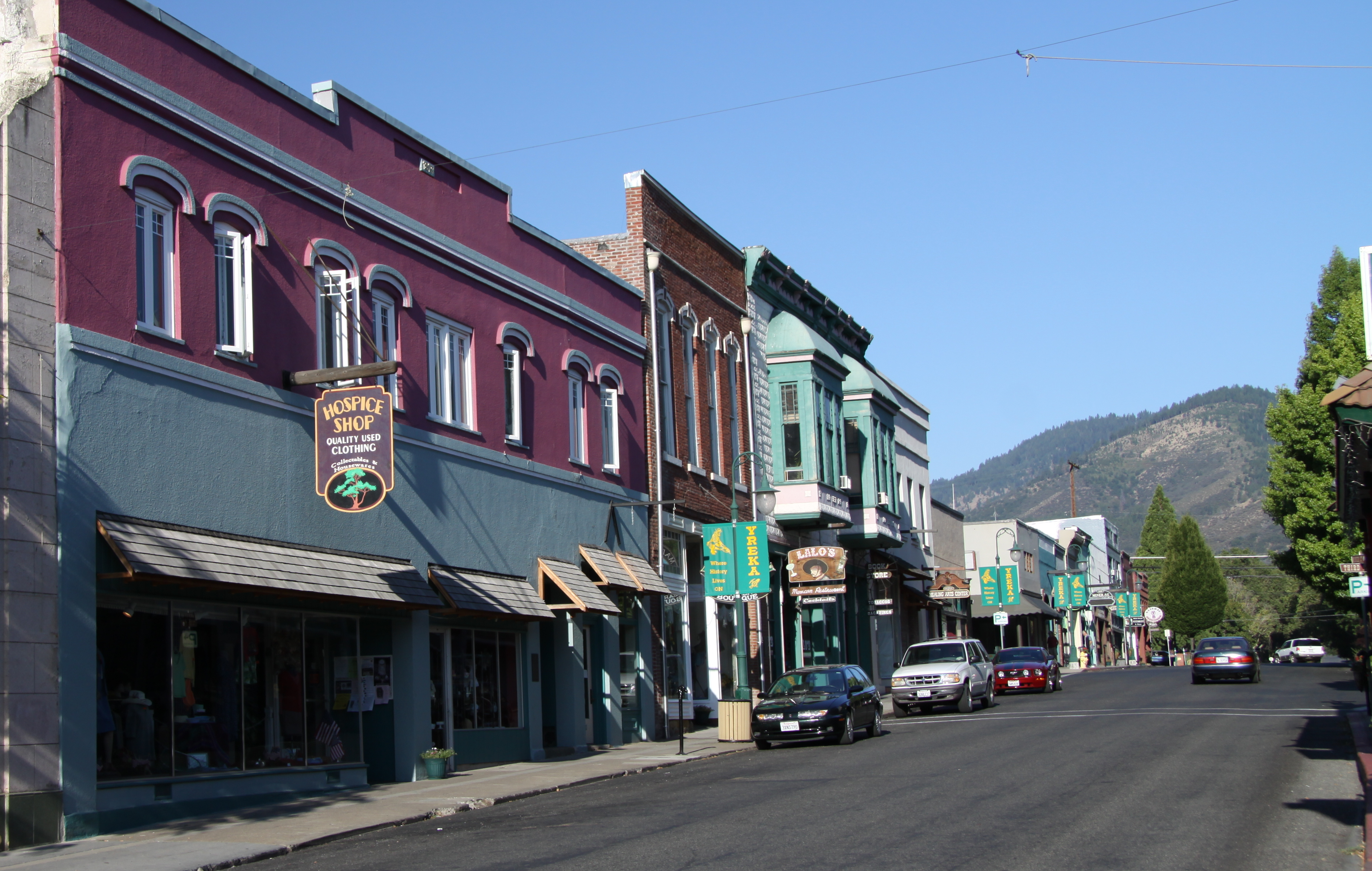
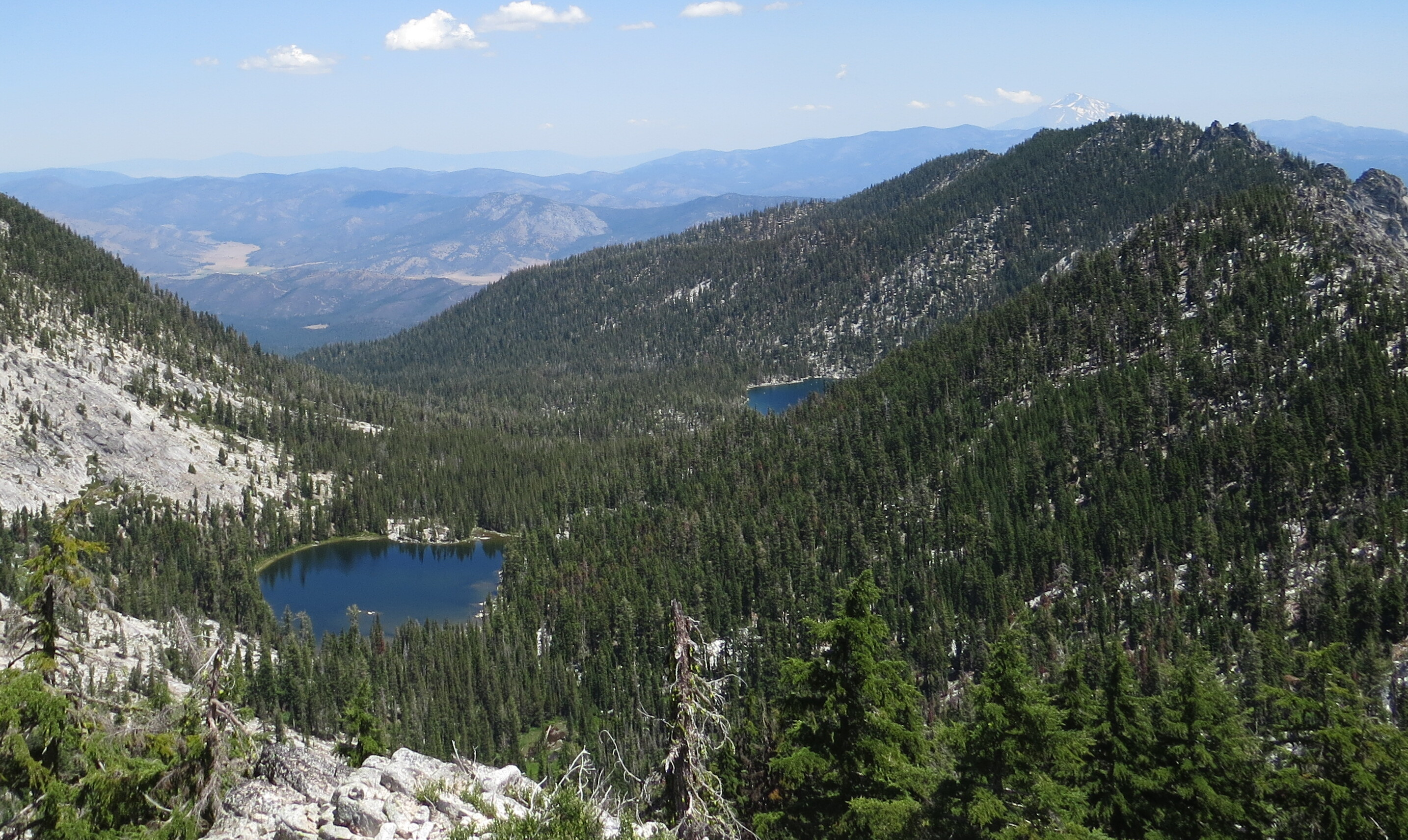
- Mount Shasta and Lake Siskiyou Dunsmuir McCloud Falls Mt. Shasta Yreka Klamath Forest

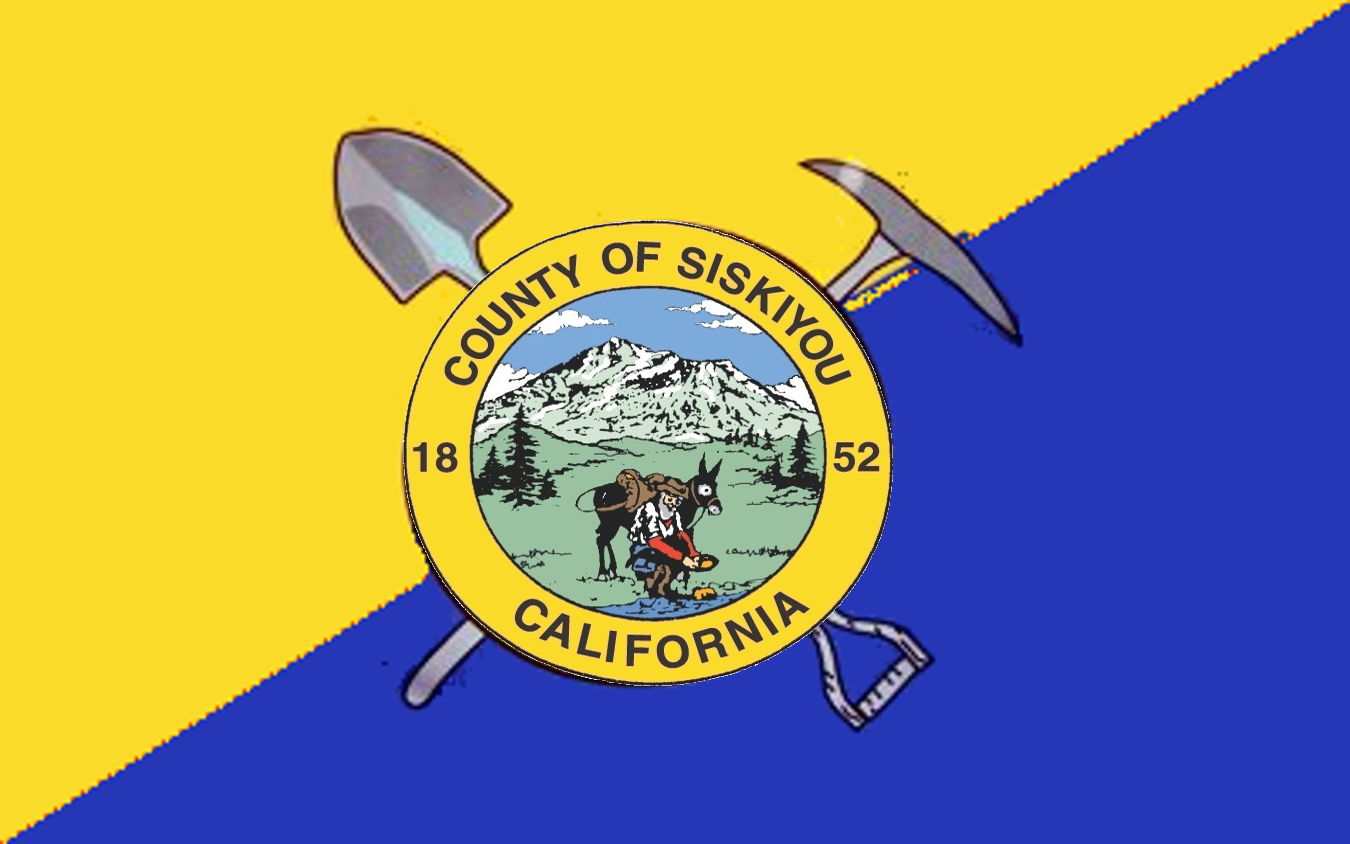
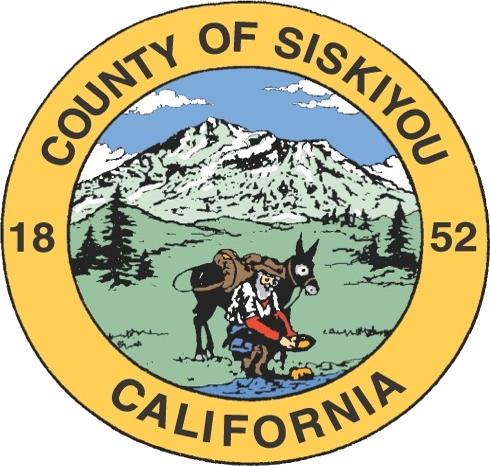
- Flag Seal
- Motto: "Mountains of Opportunity"
- Interactive map of Siskiyou County
- Location in the state of California
- Coordinates: 41°35′N 122°30′W
- Country: United States
- State: California
- Region: Shasta Cascade
- Incorporated: March 22, 1852
- Named for: The Siskiyou Trail
- County seat: Yreka
- Largest city: Yreka

Government
  - Type: Council–Administrator
  - Chair: Ray A. Haupt
  - Vice Chair: Jess W. Harris
  - Board of Supervisors: Supervisors: Jess W. Harris; Ed Valenzuela; Michael N. Kobseff; Nancy Ogren; Ray A. Haupt
  - County Administrator: Terry Barber

Area
  - Total: 6,347 sq mi (16,440 km^{2})
  - Land: 6,278 sq mi (16,260 km^{2})
  - Water: 69 sq mi (180 km^{2})
- Highest elevation: 14,162 ft (4,317 m)

Population (2020)
  - Total: 44,076
  - Estimate (2025): 42,013 ▼
  - Density: 7.021/sq mi (2.711/km^{2})

GDP
  - Total: $2.008 billion (2022)
- Time zone: UTC−8 (Pacific Time Zone)
  - Summer (DST): UTC−7 (Pacific Daylight Time)
- Area code: 530
- FIPS code: 06-093
- GNIS feature ID: 277311
- Congressional district: 1st
- Website: co.siskiyou.ca.us

Siskiyou County (/ˈsɪskjuː/ SISK-yoo) is a county in the northwest of the U.S. state of California. As of the 2020 census, the population was 44,076. Its county seat is Yreka and its highest point is Mount Shasta. It is within the Cascadia bioregion.

Siskiyou County is in the Shasta Cascade region along the Oregon border. Because of its outdoor recreation, Mt. Shasta, McCloud River, and Gold Rush-era history, it is an important tourist destination within the state.

== History ==
Many Native American peoples, including the Confederated Tribes of Siletz Indians, Modoc, Cayuse, Umatilla and Walla Walla and Shasta, share geography with Siskiyou County and have lived in the area for millennia prior to colonization. Siskiyou County was created on March 22, 1852, from parts of Shasta and Klamath counties, and named after the Siskiyou mountain range. Parts of the county's territory were given to Modoc County in 1893.

The county is the site of the central section of the Siskiyou Trail, which ran between California's Central Valley and the Pacific Northwest. The Siskiyou Trail followed indigenous footpaths from Native People who share the geography with Siskikyou county, and was extended by Hudson's Bay Company trappers in the 1830s. Its length was increased by "Forty-Niners" during the California gold rush.

After the discovery of an important gold strike near today's Yreka, California, in 1851, colonizers flooded the area. This was described in detail by Joaquin Miller in his semi-autobiographical novel Life Amongst the Modocs.

In the mid-1880s, the construction of the Central Pacific Railroad along the Siskiyou Trail brought the first wave of tourism. Visitors were drawn by the county's many summer resorts, and to hunt or fish. The Southern Pacific railroad, the successor to the Central Pacific, called its rail line "The Road of A Thousand Wonders."

In the early 1940s, Siskiyou County was home to the semi-serious State of Jefferson movement, which sought to create a new state from several counties of northern California and the adjoining counties of southern Oregon. The movement has seen a revival in recent years.

The origin of the word Siskiyou is not known. It may be a Chinook Jargon word for a "bob-tailed horse" (ultimately originating in Cree), or as was argued before the State Senate in 1852, from the French Six Cailloux (six stones), a name given to a ford on the Umpqua River by Michel Laframboise and his Hudson's Bay Company trappers in 1832. Others claim the Six Cailloux name was appropriated by Stephen Meek, another Hudson's Bay Company trapper who discovered Scott Valley, for a crossing on the Klamath River near Hornbrook.

The county is home to the Black Bear Ranch, a commune started in 1968 with the slogan "Free Land for free people."

On September 4, 2013, the Siskiyou County Board of Supervisors voted 4 to 1 to secede from the state of California.

== Geography ==
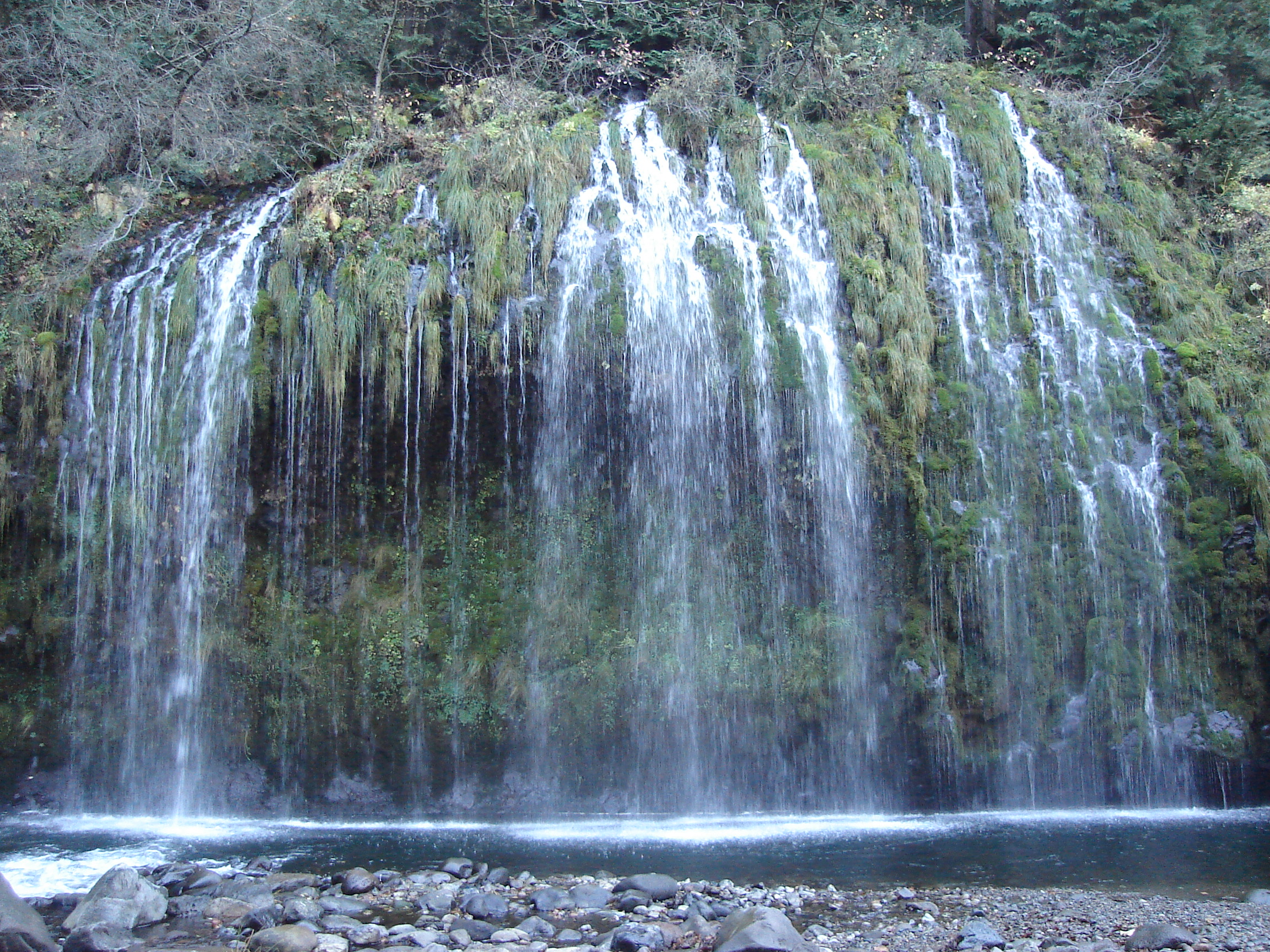
Mossbrae Falls, near Dunsmuir, California

According to the U.S. Census Bureau, the county has a total area of 6,347 square miles (16,440 km^{2}), of which 6,278 square miles (16,260 km^{2}) is land and 69 square miles (180 km^{2}), or 1.1%, is water. Also according to the U.S. Census Bureau, It is the fifth-largest county by area in California.

Siskiyou County is geographically diverse. From towering Mount Shasta (elev. 14,179 ft; 4,322 m) near the center of the county, to lakes and dense forests, as well as desert, chaparral, and memorable waterfalls, the county is home to world-famous trout-fishing rivers and streams, such as the Sacramento and McCloud rivers. The county is dotted as well with lakes and reservoirs, such as Castle Lake and Lake Siskiyou. Mount Shasta itself has a winter sports center. Pastoral Scott Valley in the western part of the county has many wide, tree-lined meadows, supporting large cattle ranches. The basins of northeastern Siskiyou County, including Butte Valley, Lower Klamath and Tule Lake basins, have some of the deepest and richest soils in the state, producing alfalfa, potatoes, horseradish, and brewing barley. Butte Valley nurseries are the leading source of premium strawberry plants in North America. Much of the county is densely forested with pine, fir, incense-cedar, oak, and madrone; Siskiyou County is also home to the rare Baker's Cypress Tree, Cupressus bakeri, which grows in only eleven scattered locations in the world, five of which are in Siskiyou County. The county's natural resources are most often used these days for skiing, snowboarding, hiking, mountain biking, camping, and wilderness recreation, as historic logging practices have been largely discontinued due to Federal and State environmental regulations. The county's water is viewed as sufficiently pure and abundant that the county is a source of significant amounts of bottled water, distributed throughout the country. A large Crystal Geyser plant is at the base of Mt. Shasta, near Weed.

=== Flora and fauna ===
Substantial amounts of the county are forested within the Siskiyou and Cascade Ranges, including significant oak woodland and mixed conifer forests. Siskiyou County is the northern extent of the range for California buckeye, a widespread California endemic. The Klamath National Forest occupies 1,700,000 acres (6,900 km^{2}) of land which includes elements in Siskiyou County as well as Jackson County, Oregon.

=== Adjacent counties ===
- Josephine County, Oregon - northwest
- Jackson County, Oregon - north
- Klamath County, Oregon - northeast
- Modoc County - east
- Shasta County - southeast
- Trinity County - south
- Humboldt County - southwest
- Del Norte County - west

=== National protected areas ===
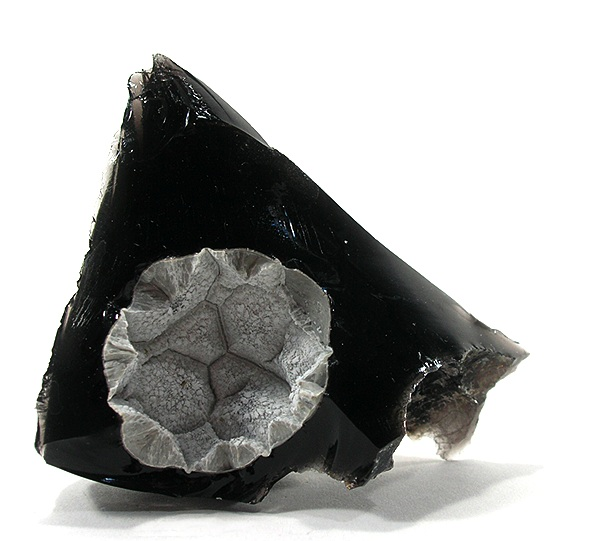
Cristobalite on obsidian, found near Lava Beds National Monument

- Butte Valley National Grassland
- Klamath National Forest (part)
- Lava Beds National Monument (part)
- Lower Klamath National Wildlife Refuge (part)
- Modoc National Forest (part)
- Rogue River National Forest (part)
- Shasta National Forest (part)
- Six Rivers National Forest (part)
- Tule Lake National Wildlife Refuge (part)
- Tule Lake Unit, World War II Valor in the Pacific National Monument (part)

== Transportation ==
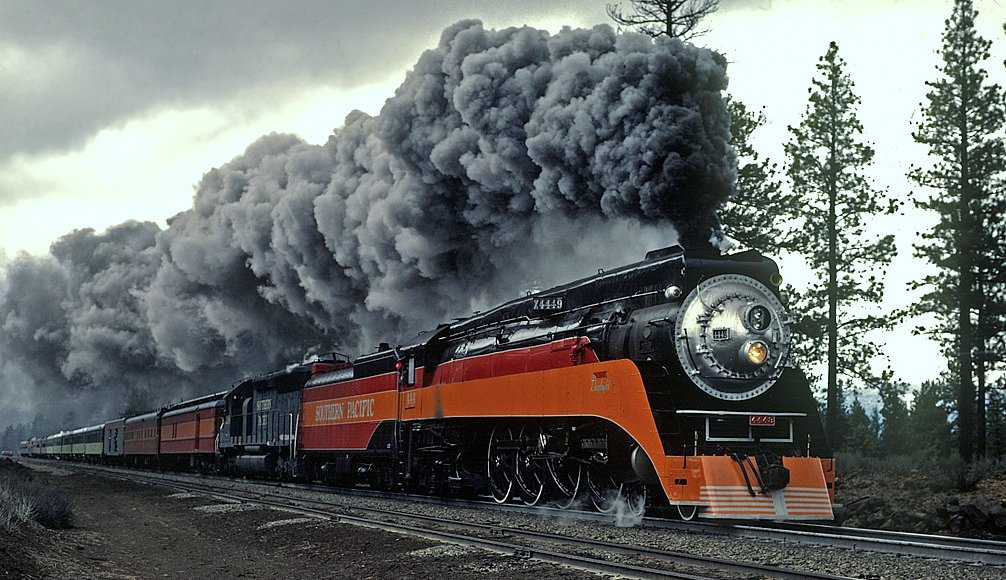
Southern Pacific 4449 at Bray, en route to Railfair 1981

=== Major highways ===
- Interstate 5
- U.S. Route 97
- State Route 3
- State Route 89
- State Route 96
- State Route 139
- State Route 161
- State Route 263
- State Route 265

=== Public transportation ===
Siskiyou Transit And General Express (STAGE) operates buses connecting the more populated areas of the county. Amtrak trains stop in Dunsmuir. Amtrak Thruway formerly operated between Sacramento and Medford, OR, with stops in Yreka, Weed, Mount Shasta, and Dunsmuir, for passengers connecting to and from Amtrak trains in Sacramento or Stockton; this service was discontinued in 2009. Greyhound buses pass through the county on Interstate 5 with a stop in Weed.

=== Airports ===
Siskiyou County owns and operates Butte Valley Airport, Happy Camp Airport, Scott Valley Airport, Siskiyou County Airport and Weed Airport (all general aviation). Dunsmuir Municipal-Mott Airport and Montague-Yreka Rohrer Field are also within the county.

The closest airports for commercial domestic plane departures are Rogue Valley International-Medford Airport north of the county in Medford, Oregon, Crater Lake–Klamath Regional Airport, northeast of the county in Klamath Falls, Oregon, and Redding Municipal Airport south of the county in Redding, California.

== Politics ==
=== Voter registration statistics ===
Population and registered voters
Total population	44,687	
Registered voters (Note: Percentage of registered voters with respect to total population. Percentages of party members with respect to registered voters follow.)	25,582	57.2%
Democratic	8,253	32.3%
Republican	10,458	40.9%
Democratic–Republican spread	-2,205	-8.6%
Independent	1,126	4.4%
Green	196	0.8%
Libertarian	264	1.0%
Peace and Freedom	89	0.3%
Americans Elect	1	0.0%
Other	57	0.2%
No party preference	5,138	20.1%

==== Cities by population and voter registration ====
Cities by population and voter registration
City	Population	Registered voters	Democratic	Republican	D–R spread	Other	No party preference
Dorris	872	42.5%	30.5%	42.3%	-11.8%	8.4%	22.4%
Dunsmuir	1,663	56.2%	41.5%	24.5%	+17.0%	13.7%	24.6%
Etna	721	58.5%	29.1%	46.0%	-16.9%	9.7%	18.7%
Fort Jones	595	63.5%	30.4%	44.4%	-14.0%	10.1%	18.8%
Montague	1,510	47.8%	24.8%	44.6%	-19.8%	12.3%	23.8%
Mount Shasta	3,411	59.8%	42.6%	25.3%	+17.3%	10.4%	25.3%
Tulelake	981	24.9%	22.5%	54.5%	-32.0%	8.6%	18.4%
Weed	2,947	44.8%	45.6%	24.0%	+21.6%	14.5%	21.7%
Yreka	7,696	52.3%	30.8%	42.5%	-11.7%	11.0%	20.3%

=== Overview ===
Siskiyou is a strongly Republican county in presidential and congressional elections. The last Democrat to win a majority in the county was Lyndon Johnson in 1964; however, Bill Clinton won a plurality of votes in 1992.

United States presidential election results for Siskiyou County, California (Note: This total comprised 1,740 votes for Progressive Theodore Roosevelt (who was official Republican nominee in California), 633 votes for Socialist Eugene V. Debs and 104 votes for Prohibition Party nominee Eugene W. Chafin.)
Year	Republican		Democratic		Third party(ies)	
Year	No.	%	No.	%	No.	%
1892	1,493	46.27%	1,605	49.74%	129	4.00%
1896	1,473	44.98%	1,724	52.64%	78	2.38%
1900	1,898	52.36%	1,668	46.01%	59	1.63%
1904	2,104	59.67%	1,219	34.57%	203	5.76%
1908	1,813	47.40%	1,657	43.32%	355	9.28%
1912	29	0.58%	2,465	49.57%	2,479	49.85%
1916	2,059	34.13%	3,447	57.15%	526	8.72%
1920	2,909	60.05%	1,502	31.01%	433	8.94%
1924	2,437	40.58%	584	9.73%	2,984	49.69%
1928	3,758	55.49%	2,916	43.06%	98	1.45%
1932	2,458	26.76%	6,367	69.33%	359	3.91%
1936	2,919	29.46%	6,865	69.28%	125	1.26%
1940	4,387	35.92%	7,714	63.17%	111	0.91%
1944	4,351	42.15%	5,914	57.29%	58	0.56%
1948	5,315	42.53%	6,749	54.00%	434	3.47%
1952	8,735	55.69%	6,800	43.35%	151	0.96%
1956	6,841	49.79%	6,837	49.76%	63	0.46%
1960	6,279	42.95%	8,245	56.40%	96	0.66%
1964	5,186	36.18%	9,126	63.66%	23	0.16%
1968	6,334	46.13%	6,260	45.59%	1,138	8.29%
1972	7,563	51.46%	6,434	43.78%	699	4.76%
1976	7,070	48.37%	7,060	48.31%	485	3.32%
1980	9,331	55.75%	5,664	33.84%	1,743	10.41%
1984	10,544	58.25%	7,130	39.39%	427	2.36%
1988	9,056	50.88%	8,365	47.00%	376	2.11%
1992	6,660	32.21%	8,254	39.91%	5,765	27.88%
1996	8,653	47.30%	7,022	38.39%	2,618	14.31%
2000	12,198	61.55%	6,323	31.90%	1,298	6.55%
2004	12,673	60.64%	7,880	37.71%	346	1.66%
2008	11,520	53.66%	9,292	43.28%	658	3.06%
2012	11,077	55.64%	8,046	40.41%	787	3.95%
2016	11,341	55.34%	7,234	35.30%	1,917	9.35%
2020	13,290	56.62%	9,593	40.87%	589	2.51%
2024	12,461	57.96%	8,329	38.74%	708	3.29%

Siskiyou County is in California's 1st congressional district, represented by Republican James Gallagher.

In the state legislature Siskiyou is in the 1st senatorial district, represented by Republican Megan Dahle, and the 1st Assembly district, represented by Republican Heather Hadwick.

On November 4, 2008, Siskiyou County voted 60.1% for Proposition 8 which amended the California Constitution to ban same-sex marriages. Dunsmuir and Mount Shasta voted against Prop 8.

On September 3, 2013, the Siskiyou County Board of Supervisors voted 4–1 in favor of secession from California to form a proposed state named Jefferson. A similar move was made in 1941, but was shelved due to the attack on Pearl Harbor.

== Crime ==
The following table includes the number of incidents reported and the rate per 1,000 persons for each type of offense.

Population and crime rates
Population	44,687	
Violent crime	183	4.10
Homicide	1	0.02
Forcible rape	18	0.40
Robbery	16	0.36
Aggravated assault	148	3.31
Property crime	447	10.00
Burglary	257	5.75
Larceny-theft (Note: Only larceny-theft cases involving property over $400 in value are reported as property crimes.)	467	10.45
Motor vehicle theft	82	1.83
Arson	3	0.07

=== Cities by population and crime rates ===
Cities by population and crime rates
City	Population	Violent crimes	Violent crime rate per 1,000 persons	Property crimes	Property crime rate per 1,000 persons
Dorris	939	1	1.06	23	24.49
Dunsmuir	1,650	5	3.03	41	24.85
Etna	737	1	1.36	2	2.71
Fort Jones	841	0	0.00	14	16.65
Lake Shastina	2,460	0	0.00	0	0.00
Montague	1,443	2	1.39	6	4.16
Mount Shasta	3,396	5	1.47	79	23.26
Tulelake	1,010	1	0.99	5	4.95
Weed	2,970	18	6.06	125	42.09
Yreka	7,768	42	5.41	293	37.72

== Demographics ==
Historical population
Census	Pop.	Note	%±
1860	7,629		—
1870	6,848		−10.2%
1880	8,610		25.7%
1890	12,163		41.3%
1900	16,962		39.5%
1910	18,801		10.8%
1920	18,545		−1.4%
1930	25,480		37.4%
1940	28,598		12.2%
1950	30,733		7.5%
1960	32,885		7.0%
1970	33,225		1.0%
1980	39,732		19.6%
1990	43,531		9.6%
2000	44,301		1.8%
2010	44,900		1.4%
2020	44,076		−1.8%
2025 (est.)	42,013	▼	−4.7%
U.S. Decennial Census; 1790–1960 1900–1990; 1990–2000 2010–2015

=== 2020 census ===
As of the 2020 census, the county had a population of 44,076. The median age was 48.5 years; 19.3% of residents were under the age of 18 and 26.7% of residents were 65 years of age or older. For every 100 females there were 98.5 males, and for every 100 females age 18 and over there were 96.5 males age 18 and over.

The racial makeup of the county was 76.2% White, 1.1% Black or African American, 4.6% American Indian and Alaska Native, 2.0% Asian, 0.1% Native Hawaiian and Pacific Islander, 4.5% from some other race, and 11.5% from two or more races. Hispanic or Latino residents of any race comprised 12.5% of the population.

29.1% of residents lived in urban areas, while 70.9% lived in rural areas.

There were 19,219 households in the county, of which 23.4% had children under the age of 18 living with them and 27.6% had a female householder with no spouse or partner present. About 32.2% of all households were made up of individuals and 17.4% had someone living alone who was 65 years of age or older.

There were 22,929 housing units, of which 16.2% were vacant. Among occupied housing units, 66.4% were owner-occupied and 33.6% were renter-occupied. The homeowner vacancy rate was 1.8% and the rental vacancy rate was 6.0%.

=== Racial and ethnic composition ===
Siskiyou County, California – Racial and ethnic composition Note: the US Census treats Hispanic/Latino as an ethnic category. This table excludes Latinos from the racial categories and assigns them to a separate category. Hispanics/Latinos may be of any race.
Race / Ethnicity (NH = Non-Hispanic)	Pop 1980	Pop 1990	Pop 2000	Pop 2010	Pop 2020	% 1980	% 1990	% 2000	% 2010	% 2020
White alone (NH)	35,542	38,246	36,910	35,683	32,057	89.45%	87.86%	83.32%	79.47%	72.73%
Black or African American alone (NH)	596	682	556	552	471	1.50%	1.57%	1.26%	1.23%	1.07%
Native American or Alaska Native alone (NH)	1,485	1,685	1,605	1,549	1,757	3.74%	3.87%	3.62%	3.45%	3.99%
Asian alone (NH)	155	351	523	528	866	0.39%	0.81%	1.18%	1.18%	1.96%
Native Hawaiian or Pacific Islander alone (NH)	x	x	49	69	38	x	x	0.11%	0.15%	0.09%
Other race alone (NH)	63	18	42	64	265	0.16%	0.04%	0.09%	0.14%	0.60%
Mixed race or Multiracial (NH)	x	x	1,262	1,840	3,095	x	x	2.85%	4.10%	7.02%
Hispanic or Latino (any race)	1,891	2,549	3,354	4,615	5,527	4.76%	5.86%	7.57%	10.28%	12.54%
Total	39,732	43,531	44,301	44,900	44,076	100.00%	100.00%	100.00%	100.00%	100.00%

=== American Community Survey 2025 data ===
The United States Census Bureau estimated that in 2025, Siskiyou County’s population was 42.013. It was also estimated that the county's population was 71,13% Non-Hispanic White, 14,93% Hispanic or Latino, 1,18% Non-Hispanic Black, 2,43% Asian, 4,09% Native American, 0,13% Pacific Islander, and 6,11% Multiracial.

Total	Population	Percentage
Non-Hispanic White	29.885	71,13%
Hispanic or Latino	6.271	14,93%
Non-Hispanic Black	495	1,18%
Asian	1.023	2,43%
Native American	1.718	4,09%
Pacific Islander	54	0,13%
Non-Hispanic Multiracial	2.567	6,11%

=== 2010 ===
The 2010 United States census reported Siskiyou County had a population of 44,900. The racial makeup of Siskiyou County was 38,030 (84.7%) White, 571 (1.3%) African American, 1,814 (4.0%) Native American, 540 (1.2%) Asian, 80 (0.2%) Pacific Islander, 1,491 (3.3%) from other races, and 2,374 (5.3%) from two or more races. Hispanic or Latino of any race were 4,615 persons (10.3%).

Population reported at 2010 United States census
The County	Total; Population	White	African; American	Native; American	Asian	Pacific; Islander	other races	two or more races	Hispanic or Latino (of any race)
Siskiyou County	44,900	38,030	571	1,814	540	80	1,491	2,374	4,615
Incorporated cities and towns	Total; Population	White	African; American	Native; American	Asian	Pacific; Islander	other races	two or more races	Hispanic or Latino (of any race)
Dorris	939	764	19	18	5	8	77	48	197
Dunsmuir	1,650	1,443	32	17	15	4	30	109	167
Etna	737	627	0	28	1	1	6	74	26
Fort Jones	839	650	33	61	8	0	23	64	103
Montague	1,443	1,251	4	67	8	1	17	95	107
Mount Shasta	3,394	3,041	61	19	56	2	51	164	277
Tulelake	1,010	563	1	15	1	0	365	65	601
Weed	2,967	2,221	206	70	121	27	132	190	475
Yreka	7,765	6,495	57	491	94	9	168	451	753
Census-designated places	Total; Population	White	African; American	Native; American	Asian	Pacific; Islander	other races	two or more races	Hispanic or Latino (of any race)
Carrick	131	110	7	2	2	0	1	9	8
Edgewood	43	41	0	0	0	0	1	1	2
Gazelle	70	65	0	4	0	0	1	0	5
Greenview	201	161	0	10	1	0	8	21	19
Grenada	367	307	2	35	1	0	3	19	12
Happy Camp	1,190	814	2	277	7	1	18	71	95
Hornbrook	248	195	0	15	0	0	10	28	19
Macdoel	133	57	0	6	0	0	69	1	78
McCloud	1,101	1,039	8	10	6	0	5	33	65
Mount Hebron	95	73	0	1	0	0	18	3	41
Tennant	41	36	0	2	0	0	1	2	4
Other unincorporated areas	Total; Population	White	African; American	Native; American	Asian	Pacific; Islander	other races	two or more races	Hispanic or Latino (of any race)
All others not CDPs (combined)	20,536	18,077	139	666	214	27	487	926	1,561

=== 2000 ===
As of the census of 2000, there were 44,301 people, 18,556 households, and 12,228 families residing in the county. The population density was 7 per square mile (2.7/km^{2}). There were 21,947 housing units at an average density of 4 per square mile (1.5/km^{2}). The racial makeup of the county was 87.1% White, 1.3% Black or African American, 3.9% Native American, 1.2% Asian, 0.1% Pacific Islander, 2.8% from other races, and 3.7% from two or more races. 7.6% of the population were Hispanic or Latino of any race. 13.5% were of German, 12.0% English, 9.8% Irish, 9.5% American and 7.1% Italian ancestry according to Census 2000. 91.7% spoke English and 5.7% Spanish as their first language. As of March 2012, the largest self-reported ancestry groups in Siskiyou County are 15% German, 13% English, 12% Irish and 6% Italian.

There were 18,556 households, out of which 27.6% had children under the age of 18 living with them, 51.7% were married couples living together, 10.1% had a female householder with no husband present, and 34.1% were non-families. 28.6% of all households were made up of individuals, and 12.8% had someone living alone who was 65 years of age or older. The average household size was 2.35 and the average family size was 2.87.

In the county, the population was spread out, with 24.0% under the age of 18, 6.7% from 18 to 24, 22.7% from 25 to 44, 28.4% from 45 to 64, and 18.1% who were 65 years of age or older. The median age was 43 years. For every 100 females there were 96.5 males. For every 100 females age 18 and over, there were 94.1 males.

The median income for a household in the county was $29,530, and the median income for a family was $36,890. Males had a median income of $31,936 versus $22,650 for females. The per capita income for the county was $17,570. About 14.0% of families and 18.6% of the population were below the poverty line, including 26.6% of those under age 18 and 7.3% of those age 65 or over.

== Communities ==
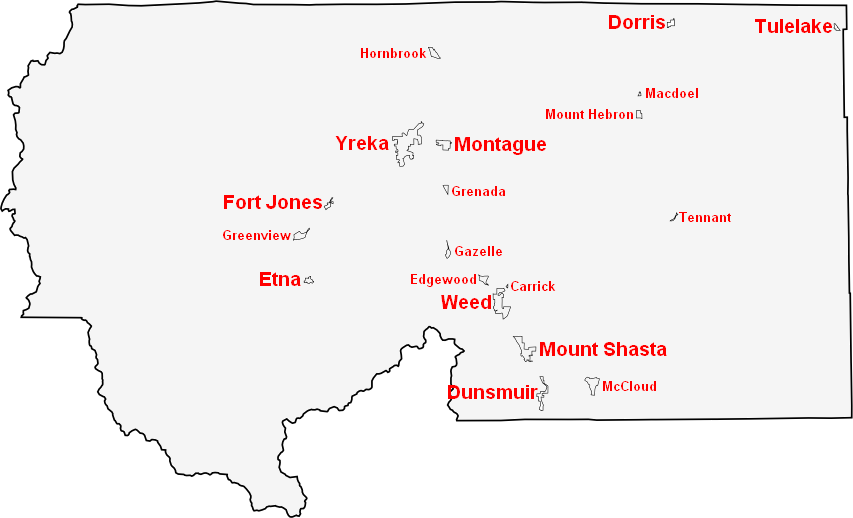

=== Cities ===
- Dorris
- Dunsmuir
- Etna
- Fort Jones
- Montague
- Mount Shasta
- Tulelake
- Weed
- Yreka (county seat)

=== Census-designated places ===
- Carrick
- Edgewood
- Gazelle
- Greenview
- Grenada
- Happy Camp
- Hornbrook
- Lake Shastina
- Macdoel
- McCloud
- Mount Hebron
- Tennant

=== Other unincorporated communities ===
- Black Bear
- Bray
- Callahan
- Cecilville
- Forks of Salmon
- Hamburg
- Hatfield (partial)
- Hilt
- Horse Creek
- Klamath River
- Little Shasta
- Oro Fino
- Pondosa
- Sawyers Bar
- Scott Bar
- Seiad Valley
- Somes Bar

=== Ghost towns ===
- Ager
- Bestville
- Gullion's Bar
- Negro Flat

=== Population ranking ===
The population ranking of the following table is based on the 2020 census of Siskiyou County.

† county seat

Rank	City/Town/etc.	Municipal type	Population (2020 Census)
1	† Yreka	City	7,807
2	Mount Shasta	City	3,223
3	Weed	City	2,862
4	Lake Shastina	CDP	2,401
5	Dunsmuir	City	1,707
6	Montague	City	1,226
7	McCloud	CDP	945
8	Happy Camp	CDP	905
9	Tulelake	City	902
10	Dorris	City	860
11	Fort Jones	City	695
12	Etna	City	678
13	Karuk Reservation	AIAN	578
14	Grenada	CDP	314
15	Hornbrook	CDP	266
16	Greenview	CDP	208
17	Quartz Valley Reservation	AIAN	202
18	Carrick	CDP	143
19	Mount Hebron	CDP	103
20	Gazelle	CDP	95
21	Macdoel	CDP	86
22	Edgewood	CDP	72
23	Tennant	CDP	63

== Education ==
K-12 school districts include:

- Butte Valley Unified School District
- Scott Valley Unified School District (Has portions that cover grades K-12 and portions that only cover grades 9-12)
- Tulelake Basin Joint Unified School District

Secondary school districts include:

- Dunsmuir Joint Union High School District
- Siskiyou Union High School District
- Yreka Union High School District

Elementary school districts include:

- Big Springs Union Elementary School District
- Bogus Elementary School District
- Butteville Union Elementary School District
- Delphic Elementary School District
- Dunsmuir Elementary School District
- Forks of Salmon Elementary School District
- Gazelle Union Elementary School District
- Grenada Elementary School District
- Happy Camp Union Elementary School District
- Hornbrook Elementary School District
- Junction Elementary School District
- Klamath River Union Elementary School District
- Little Shasta Elementary School District
- McCloud Union Elementary School District
- Montague Elementary School District
- Mount Shasta Union Elementary School District
- Seiad Elementary School District
- Weed Union Elementary School District
- Willow Creek Elementary School District
- Yreka Union Elementary School District

== See also ==
- List of museums in the Shasta Cascade (California)
- National Register of Historic Places listings in Siskiyou County, California
- Upper Soda Springs
- Shasta Springs
- Yreka Western Railroad
