= Scott Bar, California =

Unincorporated community in California, United States

- Unincorporated community
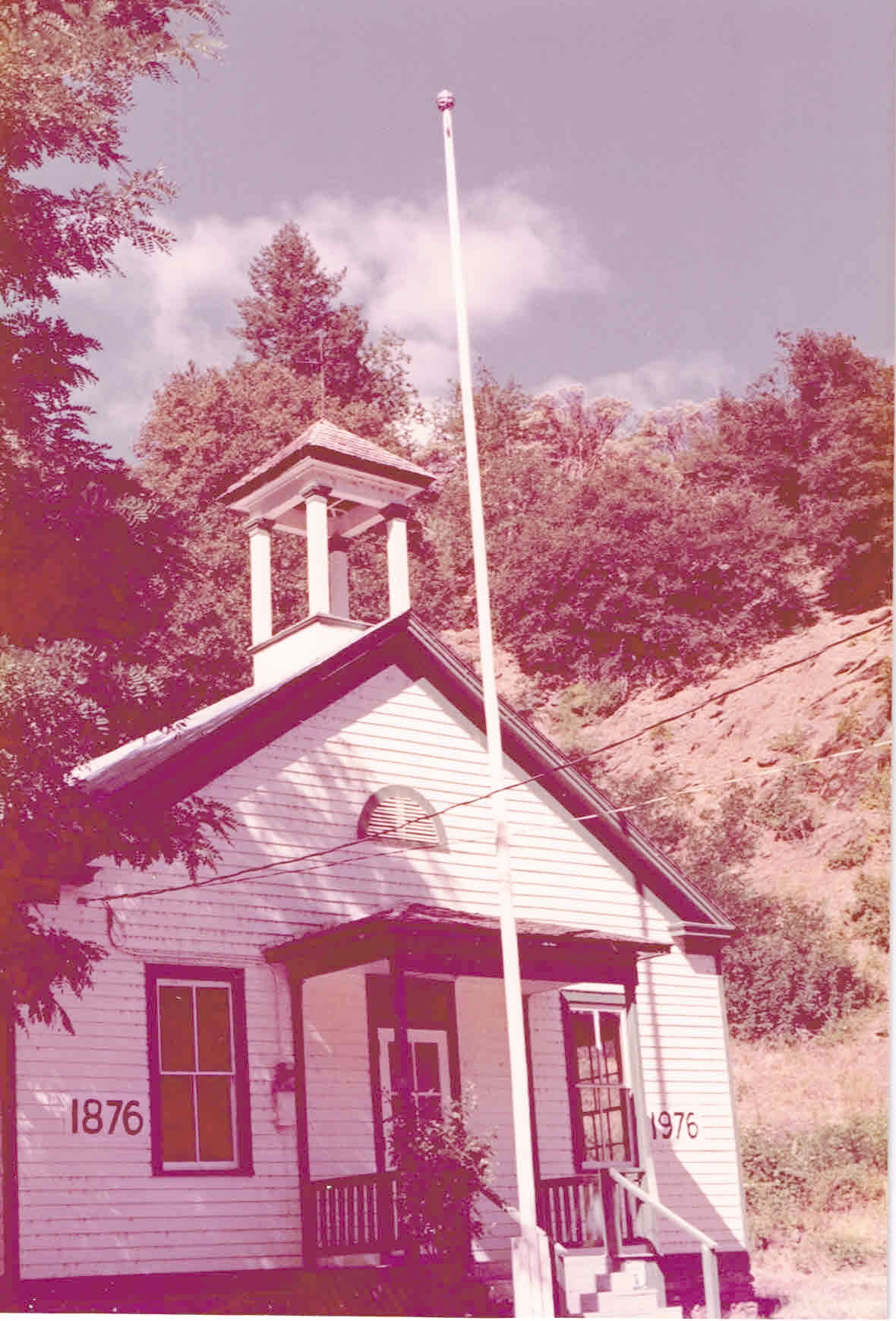
- Scott Bar School House

- Location within California Location within the United States
- Coordinates: 41°44′30″N 123°00′15″W
- Country: United States
- State: California
- County: Siskiyou
- Elevation: 1,729 ft (527 m)

Population (2000 United States census)
  - Total: 68
- Time zone: UTC-8 (Pacific (PST))
  - Summer (DST): UTC-7 (PDT)
- ZIP code: 96085
- Area code: 530
- GNIS feature ID: 1659610

Scott Bar, formerly Scott River, is an unincorporated community in Siskiyou County, California, United States. The Scott Bar community is located 19 miles (31 km) west of the town of Yreka and is three miles (4.8 km) upstream on the Scott River from the river's termination point as it flows into the larger Klamath River. The Scott River is 60 miles (97 km) long.

Scott Bar has a post office with ZIP code 96085. According to the 2000 census, ZIP Code 96085 had a population of 68.

Events are held at the community hall, such as spaghetti feeds as fundraisers for the Scott Bar Children's Association. The community's economy relies mainly on gold prospecting, logging, U.S. Forestry services, and Social Security. Scott Bar has an abundance of recreation such as fishing, hunting, swimming, rafting, and skeet shooting. During the summer months, many non-locals can be found visiting the Scott River. They enjoy the recreational amenities of one of California's cleanest and most pristine rivers.

== History ==
The community of Scott Bar, the Scott River, and nearby Scott Valley were all named after John W. Scott, who discovered gold in the river at Scott Bar in the summer of 1850. A commemorative historical monument located across the road from the community hall has a mounted bronze arrow pointing to the location in the river where Mr. Scott made his discovery. The post office opened as Scott River in 1856 and changed its name to Scott Bar in 1906; it briefly closed between 1944 and 1947. Scott Bar's community hall acted as a one-room elementary school from the early 1900s to the 1950s.
