= Tsofkara, California =

Former Karok settlement in Humboldt County, California

Tsofkara (possibly Karok: taxasufkára; also Soof-curra, T'sof-ka-ra, Tuck-a-soof-curra, and Witsogo) is a former Karok settlement in Humboldt County, California, United States. It was located above Chinits on the east bank of the Klamath River, nearly halfway between Orleans Bar and the Salmon River. In 1852 it consisted of nine houses.
