= Karuk Tribe =

Native American Tribe in California, United States

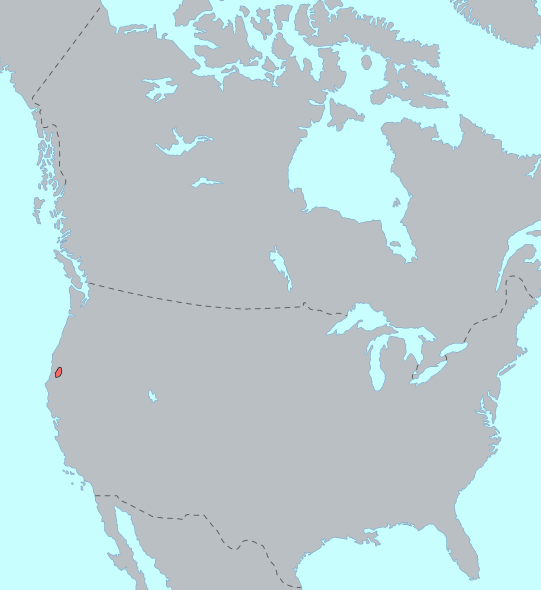
- Karuk language distribution

Total population
- 4,800 enrolled members

Regions with significant populations
- United States (California)

Languages
- English, Karuk

Religion
- traditional tribal religion, Christianity

Related ethnic groups
- other Karuk people

The Karuk Tribe is a federally recognized Indian tribe of Karuk people. They are an indigenous people of California, located in the northwestern corner of the state, in Humboldt and Siskiyou counties. The Karuk Tribe is one of the largest Indian tribes in California. Karuk Aboriginal Territory measures more than one-million acres and crosses the California-Oregon border. Karuk Aboriginal Territory is unceded land occupied by federal and private landholdings administered predominately by the Six Rivers and Klamath National Forests, and the Pacific Region of the Bureau of Indian Affairs. The Tribe administers nearly ten thousand acres of Tribal Trust and Tribal Fee Lands.

As a government organization, the Karuk Tribe of California has demonstrated its ability to administer a multitude of social, cultural, and economic programs effectively, earning the status of a "Self-Governance Tribe." The Tribal government currently employs more than 100 people in administrative, child welfare, community/economic development, education, elders, energy assistance, health, housing, human services, and natural resources programs. In little more than a decade, the Karuk Tribe has developed housing divisions, health clinics, libraries, local workforce infrastructure, and Head Start programs in Orleans (Karok: panámniik), Happy Camp (athithúfvuunupma), and Yreka (kahtíshraam), its three government service areas. The Karuk Tribe also administers public health services, dental and medical clinical care, cultural fire return, prescribed and controlled burning, wildfire incident management, salmon fisheries enhancement projects, dam removal and habitat restoration, landscape-scale environmental monitoring and modeling, workforce development initiatives, Tribal archival and museum stewardship, data sovereignty policy development, GIS and geospatial services, and more.

== Land ==
Location of Karuk Tribal lands

Karuk Aboriginal Territory spans over one-million acres of oak woodland, timber forest, meadows, floodplains, mountains, grasslands, and developed areas centered along the Klamath River Basin in the Mid-Klamath Region. Karuk Aboriginal Territory reaches from above Seiad Valley nearly to Hamburg, and descends to the Bluff Creek (yurúkthuuf) area past Weitchpec (ansáfriik). The Tribe originally had over 120 village sites along this length of the Klamath River (ishkêesh), with some villages along the first four miles of the Salmon River (masúhsav) north of the Salmon-Klamath River confluence near Somes Bar (yuh'iitíhirak).

The Karuk do not have a legally designated reservation but do have a number of parcels held in Tribal Trust status that are dualy administered by the federal government, as well as parcels owned by the tribe in Tribal Fee status. These parcels of land are primarily located in Yreka, CA and then along the Klamath River in western Siskiyou County and northeastern Humboldt County in California. The total land area of these parcels is over 9,000 acres (3,600 ha) (hectares). A resident population of 498 persons for the Trust and Fee areas was reported in the 2020 census. The contiguous Trust Land parcels located within the city of Yreka make up the largest Tribal Housing area administered by the Tribe, and also hold the Rain Rock Casino and Hotel as well as the Gaming Commission Offices.

Map of Karuk Reservation and their trust lands and nearby reservations (red.)

== Government ==
The Karuk Tribal Administration is headquartered in Happy Camp, California, and governed by a nine-member council. As of 2024, it comprises:

- Chairman: Russell "Buster" Attebery
- Vice-chairman: Kenneth "Binx" Brink
- Secretary/Treasurer: Scott Quinn
- Member-at-large: Eli Hensher-Aubrey (Orleans)
- Member-at-large: Arch Super (Yreka)
- Member-at-large: Jennifer Goodwin (Happy Camp)
- Member-at-large: Aaron "Troy" Hockaday
- Member-at-large: Kristen King (Orleans)
- Member-at-large: Robert Super (Yreka)

== Language ==
The Karuk people speak the Karuk language, a language isolate. Karuk has been proposed as belonging to the Hokan language family. The tribe has an active language revitalization program and digital repository with language materials, including curriculum, research, and archival audiorecordings. With fewer than five active full-time speakers alive as of 2025, Karuk language or Ararahih Kich (literally: "the People's Language") (also known as Karok, Quoratem, Charoc, and Quoratean) is considered to be a severely endangered language according to the Endangered Languages Project. The language is in a vital time of engagement in face of loss of fluent speakers. Field recordings, primary texts, lexical resources, language descriptions, and other resources about the language have been archived by the Karuk Tribe Sipnuuk Digital Repository and the University of California, Berkeley California Language Archive.

== Business ==
The tribe operates the Rain Rock Casino in Yreka, California.

The People's Center in Happy Camp is the tribe's museum and cultural center. The 5,000-square-foot building (460 m^{2}) has a changing gallery, museum store, classroom, library branch, office for the language program, and archives and collections storage. The Sipnuuk Digital Archive and Panamnik Center Library are sister services to the People's Center Museum.

A tribally owned Internet service provider, Áan Chúuphan ("talking line"), installed broadband network infrastructure to provide Internet and cell service in the tribal center of Orleans. Until 2018, satellite internet access remained the only option for many residents. The Karuk Tribal Information Technology Department is currently working on a multi-partner effort to install fiber optic cabling along the entire length of the Klamath River, which is set for major implementation starting in 2026.
