= Chinits, California =

Former Karok settlement in Humboldt County, California

Chinits (possibly Karok: chîinach; also Chee-nitch and Tcheh-nits) is a former Karok settlement in Humboldt County, California, United States. It was located below Tsofkara on the south bank of the Klamath River; its precise location is unknown.
