= Kokaman, California =

Human settlement in the United States

Kokaman (also, Coc-co-man, Coc-ko-nan, Cock-o-mans, and Cok-ka-mans) is a former Karok settlement in Humboldt County, California, United States. It was located on the Klamath River; its precise location is unknown.
