= Pasara, California =

Former Native American settlement in Humboldt County, California

Pasara (also, Pas-see-roo) is a former Karok settlement in Humboldt County, California, United States. It was located on the Klamath River; its precise location is unknown.
