= Pen Pals =

Penpals, people who regularly write to each other.

Pen Pals or penpals may also refer to:

== Music ==
- Pen Pals (band), an indie folk band from the United States
- "Penpals", by Sloan from Twice Removed
- "Penpals", a track from Jazz Suite Inspired by Dylan Thomas's "Under Milk Wood"

== Other uses ==
- "Pen Pals" (Star Trek: The Next Generation), an episode of Star Trek: The Next Generation
- "Pen Pals" (The Ren & Stimpy Show), an episode of The Ren & Stimpy Show
- Pen Pals, a 1992 film starring Bai Ling
- Penpal (novel), a 2012 self-published horror/thriller novel by Dathan Auerbach
