= Opegoi, California =

Opegoi
- Former settlement
- Location in California
- Coordinates: 41°15′34″N 123°36′22″W
- Country: United States
- State: California
- County: Humboldt
- Elevation: 341 ft (104 m)

Opegoi (also, Op-pe-o, Oppe-yoh, Oppegach, Oppegoeh, Redcaps, Up-pa-goine, Up-pa-goines, and Up-pah-goines) is a former Karok settlement in Humboldt County, California, United States. It was located on the Klamath River opposite the mouth of Red Cap Creek, at an elevation of 341 feet (104 m).
