= Pen Pals (band) =

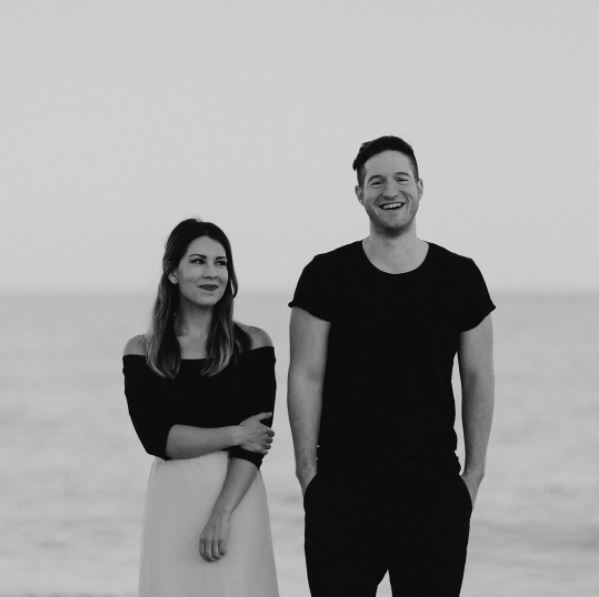

Background information
- Origin: Michigan and Georgia
- Genres: Folk
- Instrument(s): Vocals, guitar
- Years active: 2016—present
- Labels: Jetty Rae LLC
- Members: Jetty Rae; Heath McNease
- Website: penpalsmusic.com

The Pen Pals are an indie folk music group composed of artists Jetty Rae and Heath McNease. The group is known for its minimalist style and layered vocal harmonies. To date, they have released 2 albums: 'Gold' (2016) and 'I Disappear' (2017), the latter of which is said to have 'introspective lyrics of loss, sorrow, perseverance and hope'. The group itself has been cited as a 'gentler, more harmonic version of The Civil Wars'.

== Discography ==
The Pen Pals have released 2 albums in their career:

=== Gold (2015) ===
Released on September 17, 2015 described by one reviewer as "folk pop". The album spent 5 days as the most downloaded on NoiseTrade. The theme of the album is a romance that begins and ends with summer.

All lyrics are written by Heath McNease; all music is composed by Heath McNease and Brittni Stewart.

No.	Title	Length
1.	"Camp"	1:42
2.	"Open Door"	4:15
3.	"Away"	2:47
4.	"Gold"	6:03
5.	"Mary & Martha"	3:48
6.	"July"	4:14
Total length:		23:00

=== I Disappear (2017) ===
Released on July 28, 2017, with a music video for the title track. The songs written are centred around feelings of loss, heartbreak and disillusionment.

All tracks are written by Pen Pals.

No.	Title	Lyrics	Length
1.	"All Who Are Lost"	Heath McNease	3:35
2.	"Devils"	Heath McNease, Brittni Stewart	3:15
3.	"Devils"	Heath McNease, Brittni Stewart	4:11
4.	"I Will Be Your Sun"	Heath McNease	4:39
5.	"Before I Was Yours"	Heath McNease, Brittni Stewart	3:14
6.	"Out of my Hands"	Heath McNease, Brittni Stewart	4:28
7.	"I Disappear"	Heath McNease, Brittni Stewart	4:07
Total length:			28:00
