= Rob Cabitto =

American writer, business owner, and public speaker (born 1965)

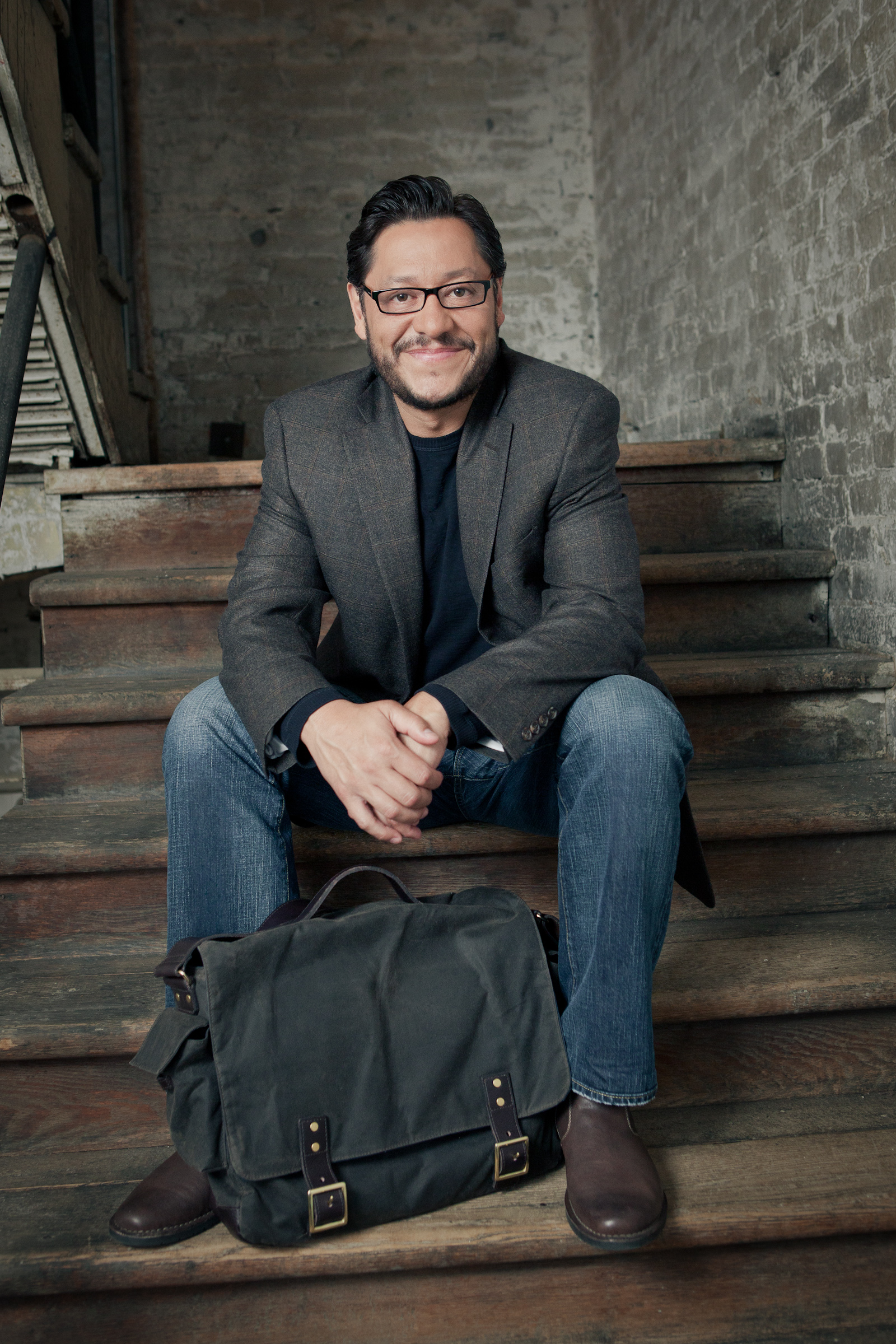
- Cabitto in 2012
- Born: December 23, 1965 (age 60)
- Occupations: Author, owner of Nine Mile Communications
- Website: www.robcabitto.com

Rob Cabitto (born December 23, 1965) is an American author, business owner, and public speaker. His book The Fractured Life of 3743 (2011) is a memoir about his struggles with identity and addiction.

== Personal life ==
Cabitto is a Native American of the Karuk tribe from Siskiyou County, California. He was adopted by a non-Native American family at the age of 5 after his biological father poured gasoline on him. His biological mother and father were absentee parents with addictions. Both parents were incarcerated at different times in Cabitto's early childhood.

Cabitto was an athlete in high school until he broke his leg in 1984 and became an alcoholic and drug addict.

As of 2012, Cabitto lives in Eden Prairie, Minnesota. He has a nine-year-old son.

== The Fractured Life of 3743 ==
Cabitto published his memoir, The Fractured Life of 3743, in 2011. The number 3743 refers to his tribal roll number. The book discusses Cabitto's loss of identity after being adopted at age 5 into a non-Native American home. The book details Cabitto's years of addictive behavior and homelessness. Cabitto began a recovery program after being arrested in 1994. The book also discusses his life experiences, including the Native American tradition of vision quest and Lakota Sundance. Cabitto wrote the book using the journals that he kept over his life.

Cabitto spoke about the events in the book on the Kevin Sponsler show on KSYC-FM 103.9 on January 25, 2012.

== Education and career ==
Cabitto has a Bachelor of Science from University of Phoenix and an MBA from New York Institute of Technology. He started a communications business in 2009 called Nine Mile Communications after working for Cisco Systems. Cabitto is also on the board of the Salvation Army.
