= Seiad Valley, California =

Unincorporated community in California, United States

- Unincorporated community
- Location within California Location within the United States
- Coordinates: 41°50′26″N 123°11′29″W
- Country: United States
- State: California
- County: Siskiyou
- Elevation: 1,388 ft (423 m)
- Time zone: UTC-8 (Pacific (PST))
  - Summer (DST): UTC-7 (PDT)
- Area code: 530
- GNIS feature ID: 232793

Seiad Valley is a small unincorporated community in Siskiyou County, California, United States, situated 15 miles south of the Oregon border. A population of approximately 300 people is clustered around the Klamath River, State Route 96, and spread out along the surrounding creeks.

The three craggy peaks of the Lower Devils look over the forested valley, which is completely surrounded on all sides by the Klamath Mountains, just north of the Marble Mountains Wilderness area. The Pacific Crest Trail, passes through the West Side of Seiad Valley.

Seiad Valley is within zip code 96086, but itself is not incorporated and so has no strictly defined boundaries.

== History ==
In 1896, It was reported that the fertile land in Seiad Valley was primarily owned by three families, the Lowden, Rainey, and Phillip's families. It was also reported that a hydraulic mine, had been operating near the valley by a group of Chinese Americans since 1852. The mine would later be known as the Sugar Pine Hydraulic Mine.

== Population ==
Approximately 350 people live in Seiad Valley. The vast majority are of European descent, a small minority is Hispanic, and another minority has some portion of Karuk or other native American ancestry.

Most people live in houses scattered about the mountains, usually along paved side-roads or dirt former logging roads. A small number of people live far off in the hills, some living a more subsistence lifestyle.

The population does not include many young people, and is increasingly aging as the younger generation moves away to find broader opportunities, although the internet is changing that dynamic.

== Economy and politics ==
The local economy includes river miners, forest service workers, farmers, health service workers, utilities managers, construction workers, Caltrans workers, pack mule trainers, elementary/high school teachers, social workers, secretaries, cooks, and self-employed business workers. Part of the population is either unemployed or living, in part, off of Social Security benefits.

A large number work in nearby Happy Camp or farther away in the county seat of Yreka. Increasingly, people are living in the pastoral setting of Seiad Valley while remote working for employers in San Francisco, Sacramento, or the Los Angeles area. The internet has made such long distance business possible and is changing the demographics of the area. The older inhabitants of the town are generally more conservative and more closely identified with the small town atmosphere while the newer inhabitants are generally more liberal and raised in urban areas.

=== Politics ===
In the state legislature Seiad Valley is in the 1st Senate District, represented by Republican Megan Dahle, and in the 2nd Assembly District, represented by Republican Jim Nielsen.

Federally, Seiad Valley is in California's 1st congressional district, represented by Republican James Gallagher.

Seiad Valley is within the fictional "State of Jefferson", which encompasses several northern California counties. The flag of the State of Jefferson flies over the general store, although the American flag flies over the nearby elementary school. Pro-Jefferson sentiment is significant, but not particularly active in the area.

== Culture ==
Seiad Valley's two claims to fame are the Pacific Crest Trail and the Seiad Cafe. During the spring and summer months hikers are a frequent sight in the central area of Seiad Valley as they pass through town to buy supplies. Secondly, the Seiad Cafe was nominated third in the Travel Channel's "Top 10 Places to Pig Out" for all of America.

Seiad Day is the yearly local celebration, and features a parade, games, music and late-night parties for the locals.
