= Jetty Rae =

American singer-songwriter

Jetty Rae Brittni Stewart
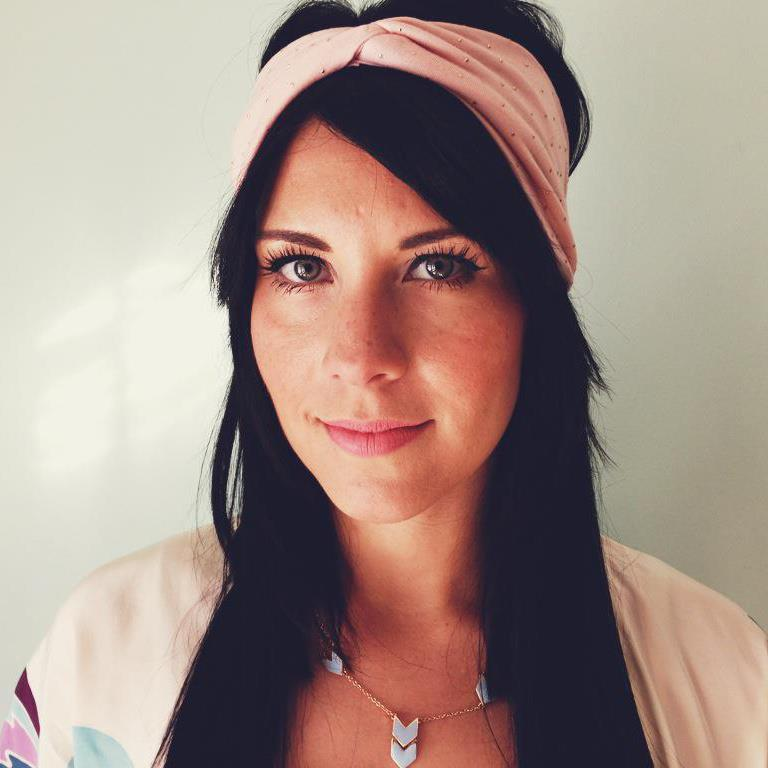
- Jetty Rae in 2013

Background information
- Born: Brittni Whittaker; January 13, 1987 (age 39); Springfield, Oregon, U.S.
- Origin: Happy Camp, California, U.S.
- Genre: Folk
- Occupation: Singer-songwriter
- Instruments: Vocals, guitar, ukulele
- Years active: 2006—present
- Label: Jetty Rae LLC
- Member of: Pen Pals
- Website: jettyrae.com

Jetty Rae (born January 13, 1987) is an unsigned American indie folk singer-songwriter (also part of the group Pen Pals) whose career began in Kona, Hawaii, but now resides in Michigan. Notable appearances include Lilith Fair 2010, CMJ Music Festival, Ann Arbor Summer Festival, The Red Jacket Jamboree, and a number of CFA festivals including Agapefest, Big Ticket, and Fandana Festival. Jetty Rae's music has been used by companies such as Microsoft, Petco, Amazon.com, and Ben and Jerry's to promote their brands. She is known for "taking lyrics and adding a depth that few artists can.". Jetty Rae's album Drowning in Grain peaked at No. 130 on the CMJ Top 200 Radio charts.

== Personal life ==
Jetty Rae was born in Springfield, Oregon, on January 13, 1987. She was raised by her parents, Tyvin and Kathleen, in an art-friendly family near the mountain town of Happy Camp, California, before moving for a short time to Colorado Springs, Colorado. Her parents were missionaries which required them to move often before finally settling down in Charlevoix, Michigan, where Jetty Rae attended Charlevoix High School. Jetty's mother started a theater group, called the Ragamuffins, in which Jetty held many roles. Rae was initially introduced to songwriting through her affinity for poetry.

Following her graduation from high school, Rae applied to Juilliard but was not accepted. Jetty Rae eventually attended the Youth With a Mission (YWAM) discipleship training school in Kona, Hawaii where she partook in 3 mission trips over two years to China, Fiji, and Australia respectively. After graduating in 2008, Jetty Rae returned to Michigan where she met her husband, Jason Stewart (to whom she now refers as her "husband-ger"). The two initially met on Facebook and were married at the Iberostar Paraiso del Mar on the Riviera Maya outside Cancun, Mexico on December 21, 2008. Jetty enjoys a love of both cooking and makeup, citing them as art forms themselves.

Jetty Rae has three children, a son named Beck and two daughters, Rowin and Jude. A daughter, Ella, was stillborn; she keeps a blog entitled "The Singing Hitchhiker" about her. Rae has a pug named Otis

In May 2016 Jetty Rae and her family moved into an Airstream, trailer which they purchased on Craigslist for $3,000.00, renovated it, and began living a minimal lifestyle. In a 2019 interview, Rae revealed that after 3 years on the road she intends to settle down in a conventional house.

== Jetty Rae namesake ==
Jetty Rae adopted the name of her paternal grandmother Jetty Rae Thom, who was a full-blooded Karuk Native American. Thom was known for her nomadic lifestyle, her desire for the outdoors, and for battling mental illnesses, including schizophrenia. Rae (musician) took her grandmother's namesake out of admiration and respect.

== Musical career ==
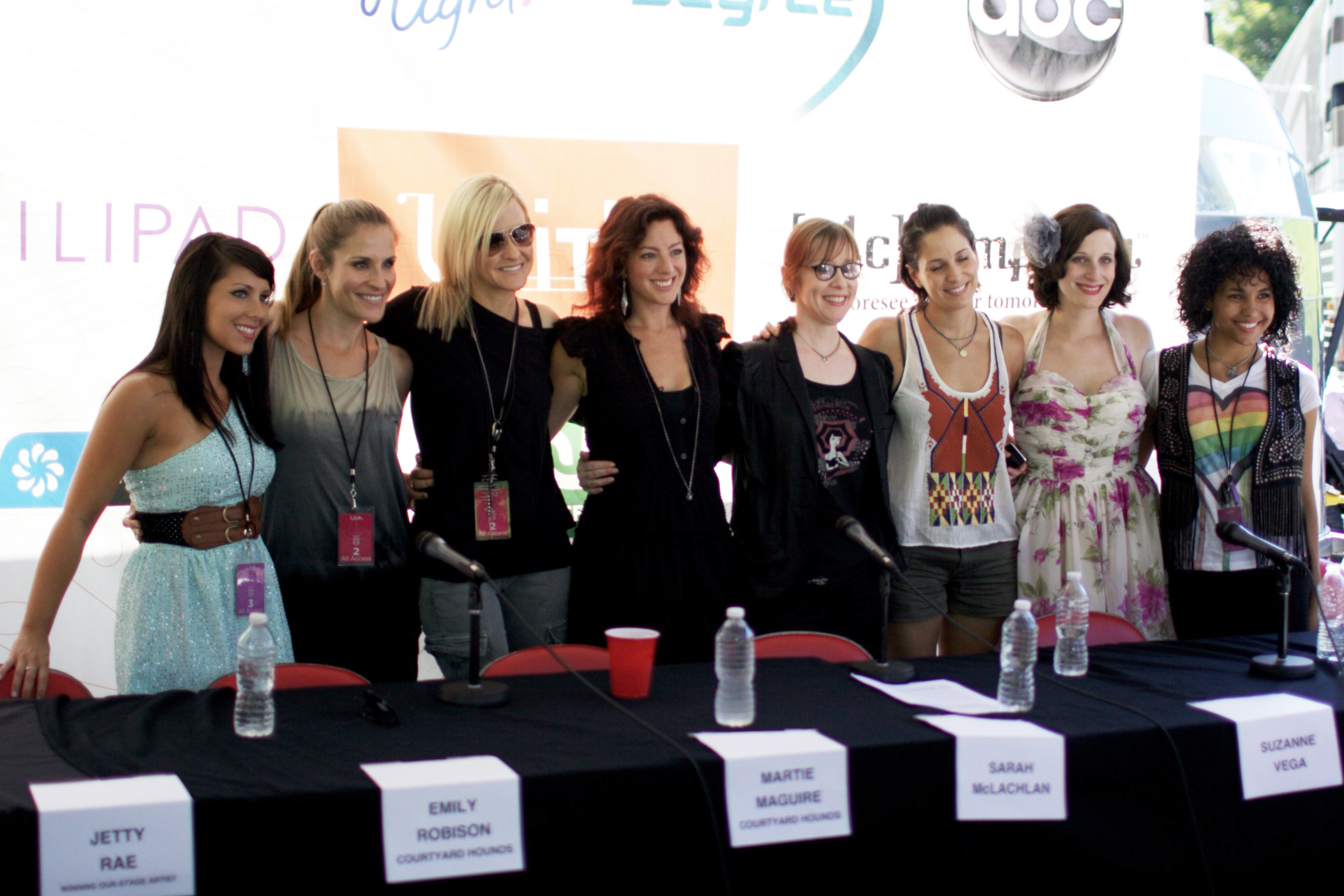
Jetty Rae (far left) at Lilith Fair 2010 with Sarah McLachlan and other artists

Rae, who considers herself a blue-collar musician, attributes the start of her musical career to the death of her grandfather, which prompted her to write her first original song "Sunshine". She says she first began writing and playing music to process her feelings but now uses her music to "serve her listeners and audience". Her first show was at Durty Jake's bar in Kona, Hawaii. While there, she joined the rap and hip-hop group Soul Chronicle, and toured the Hawaiian Islands, as well as mainland China. Her connection with Soul Chronicle led to her recording with another hip-hop group, The S.O.G. Crew.

In 2009, Rae was chosen to play at the grand opening of JetBlue's JFK Airport terminal as the grand prize winner of a competition from OurStage.

Sarah McLachlan and Terry McBride chose Rae as their featured local talent for Lilith Fair 2010 in Clarkston, Michigan, at the DTE Energy Music Theater. Rae won this opportunity through OurStage. Rae has been described as "a musician that has matured within every release, while still being true to herself."

Since becoming affiliated with NACA in 2011 Rae has been chosen as a showcasing artist four times: Northern Plains 2011, Mid-West 2012, Mid-America 2012, and Northern Plains 2013.

In 2015, Rae and fellow musician Heath McNease formed the group Pen Pals, subsequently touring and releasing albums under the moniker.

Rae is signed to SESAC (IPI #00607322083) and publishes her music under Jetty Rae LLC (IPI #00677859763).

== Influences ==
In an AnnArbor.com news article, Rae's musical influences include Lauryn Hill, Brandi Carlile, and Eva Cassidy. One reviewer compared her voice to those of Norah Jones and Amy Winehouse Rae's style has been compared to a female version of Jack Johnson, while others have noted her similarity to Jennifer Knapp. In addition to those noted above, Rae cites her influences as Mariah Carey, Damien Rice and Whitney Houston. Categorically, her music has been described as "typically good-natured acoustic pop".

Situationally, Rae cites her living in her renovated Airstream caravan as a major influence as well as "everyday hopes and heartbreak".

== Discography ==
Jetty Rae has released a number of albums and singles in her career:

=== Blackberries (2008) ===
Rae's first album. It was recorded at Runyan Studios in Bellaire, Michigan, and was released on April 16, 2008.

In retrospect, Rae has noted her musical inexperience prior to working on this album with comments like "I didn't know what EQ was when I first started... in fact, the whole recording process was a bit of a mystery."

All tracks are written by Brittni Stewart.

No.	Title	Music	Length
1.	"Won't Be Here"	Alexis Dawdy (Violin), Olivia Child (Violin), Brian Cornett (Guitar)	3:18
2.	"Danielley's Song"	Alexis Dawdy (Violin), Olivia Child (Violin), Brian Cornett (Guitar)	3:50
3.	"Restless Sea"	Alexis Dawdy (Violin), Olivia Child (Violin), Dave Runyan (Bass), Brian Cornett (Guitar)	2:34
4.	"Gualamina"	Bing Frarr (Bass), Brian Cornett (Guitar)	1:20
5.	"Mad at You"	Dave Runyan (Bass), Brian Cornett (Guitar)	2:56
6.	"Beggar"	Eric Jaqua (Bass), Brian Cornett (Guitar)	3:55
7.	"Sunshine"	Alexis Dawdy (Violin), Brian Cornett (Guitar)	4:22
8.	"Waiting"	Brian Cornett (Guitar)	3:50
9.	"Holes"	Jesse Carrasco (Vocals), Brian Cornett (Guitar)	3:55
10.	"Wings"	Alexis Dawdy (Violin), Olivia Child (Violin), Bing Frarr (Bass), Brian Cornett (Guitar)	4:06
11.	"Blessed Child"	Eric Jaqua (Bass), Dave Schwartz (Drums), Dave Runyan (Guitar), Jesse Carrasco (Vocals), Brian Cornett (Vocals & Guitar)	5:38
Total length:			39:24

=== Nobody (2009) ===
Rae's second album is an EP and was recorded and produced in Nashville, Tennessee; it was released on August 20, 2010.

All tracks are written by Brittni Stewart.

No.	Title	Length
1.	"Bad Apples"	3:04
2.	"Forget Me Not"	5:39
3.	"I Love You"	4:30
4.	"Little Girl"	4:27
5.	"Blink of an Eye"	3:39
Total length:		21:19

=== La La Lu and the Lazy Moon (2011) ===
Rae's first co-produced album was released on July 1, 2011. The album is considered a lullaby album, and Rae cites it as one of her most commercially successful despite its low budget.

All lyrics are written by Brittni Stewart except "Puff the Magic Dragon" which was written by Peter, Paul and Mary; all music is composed by Joseph Barker and Brittni Stewart.

No.	Title	Length
1.	"Lazy Moon"	3:45
2.	"Airplane"	5:04
3.	"Rainy day"	3:38
4.	"1,000 Buttons"	5:41
5.	"Puff the Magic Dragon"	5:19
6.	"Imagine"	5:29
7.	"Michigan"	4:52
8.	"By and By"	4:04
Total length:		37:52

=== Drowning in Grain (2012) ===
Rae's fourth album was recorded at Solid Sound Recording Company in Ann Arbor, Michigan. The album was released on August 1, 2012, and has been described as "nuanced and often downright idiosyncratic." It peaked at No. 130 on the CMJ Top 200 Radio charts. The track "Nice Ones" was featured by American Songwriter.

All tracks are written by Brittni Stewart.

No.	Title	Length
1.	"Nice Ones"	3:45
2.	"In Love"	4:42
3.	"Frayed Ends"	4:10
4.	"Alien"	4:16
5.	"Favorite Song"	3:26
6.	"Yarn"	4:27
7.	"Freedom"	3:41
8.	"Chocolate Sunrise"	5:04
9.	"Movies"	5:18
10.	"Promise"	4:11
Total length:		43:00

=== Climbing Clouds (2013) ===
The title track from Rae's August 2013 album "Climbing Clouds" and an associated music video was released on August 6 bearing the same name. "Fallin", another single from the album, was released on August 27 also with a music video. The last single from the album, "Kerosene", was released on October 11 in memory of her daughter; a music video for the single was also released. The music videos for this album were produced after a successful crowdfunding campaign of $11,850. Rae cites the source material for this album as briographical and the inspiration coming from grief she experienced after the loss of her 1st child Ella Rae.

All tracks are written by Brittni Stewart.

No.	Title	Length
1.	"Off The Grid"	4:08
2.	"Climbing Clouds"	3:04
3.	"Fallin'"	3:44
4.	"Too Big"	3:12
5.	"Kerosene"	4:39
6.	"Fallin' (Ballad)"	3:15
Total length:		22:02

=== More Than December (2014) ===
This is a Christmas-themed album released on November 26, 2014. Tracks include two original songs ("More Than December" and "Christmas Kiss") as well as four covers of classic Christmas songs ("O, Holy Night", "Have Yourself A Merry Little Christmas", "Little Drummer Boy" and "Auld Lang Syne"). The album was produced on an extremely tight timeline and was produced by Eric Sproull with featured vocal performances by Chris DuPont and Katie Lee. The title track has been described as "energetic".

All music is composed by Brittni Stewart.

No.	Title	Length
1.	"Little Drummer Boy"	2:52
2.	"O, Holy Night"	5:16
3.	"Christmas Kiss"	2:45
4.	"More Than December"	2:46
5.	"Have Yourself a Merry Little Christmas"	7:08
Total length:		20:27

=== Forever and Always (2015) ===
A single, released on March 16, 2015. Rae cites this track as being notable in that it's the result of a single, uninterrupted vocal recording. The song itself has a running time of 3:18, was produced by Eric Sproull, and was recorded at Bottle Rocket Studios in Ann Arbor, Michigan.

=== Can't Curse the Free (2017) ===
Released on February 17, 2017, with a running time of about 39 minutes. The album was produced by Grammy award-winning producer Mitch Dane, with musical accompaniment including many of the members from the band Jars of Clay. It was recorded at Sputnik Sound where demoing, pre-production and tracking were completed in 3 weeks. The album was mastered by Chris Athens, Published by Jetty Rae LLC and distributed by Tone Tree Music. 3 singles from this album were released prior to the full album release: Queen of the Universe; Can't Curse the Free; Take me to the Mountain.

Musically, the album has been described as "more rock and western than some of [her] previous releases" and "americana, blues, country, folk, pop, southern rock, and soul". Rae herself describes the album "victorious" in theme and biographical in content (a contrast to her previously autobiographical projects). Reviewers point to her nomadic lifestyle as influential in the album subject matter. Rae herself differentiates this album from her previous by saying "[...] following my own grief and processing that with Climbing Clouds, this album is on where I tell other peoples' stories." She also cites the inspiration for the title track "Can't Curse the Free" as a prompt from her brother asking her to create a song for a girl who's cursed.

The album received positive attention across online media distribution platforms, including iTunes.

All lyrics are written by Brittni Stewart with co-writers Chris DuPont and Ryan Horne on "The River" and "Another Town" respectively; all music is composed by Brittni Stewart and Mitch Dane.

No.	Title	Length
1.	"Can't Curse the Free"	3:28
2.	"Queen of the Universe"	3:35
3.	"Take me to the Mountain"	4:40
4.	"Another Town"	3:55
5.	"Still Gotta Fight It"	3:48
6.	"Born to Rise"	4:14
7.	"Coast to Coast"	3:21
8.	"Nose Dive"	4:13
9.	"In the Garden"	3:32
10.	"The River"	3:32
Total length:		29:00

==== Queen of the Universe (2016) ====
The first single from the 2017 album "Can't Curse the Free", released on December 9, 2016. The track has a running time of 3:35. Rae herself cites the inspiration for this song stemming from a friend's "family drama" from which she created a larger-than-life character to be the subject of this song, originally penned as a joke.

The song has been described as being "moving and meaningful", having "sweetly-delivered tongue-in-cheek rock-centric sassitude", "elements of singer-songwriter sensibilities, indie rock endeavours and pop flavour" but also grittier with descriptions like "grinds through the speakers in husky rattles" and "oozing feminine power and dominance". The work is a departure from Rae's prior works with reviewers remarking that the song has a Janis Joplin vibe and "impressive vocal abilities with soulful rock melodies" while others have compared it to Cat Power pointing to the "sultry and pop-aesthetic" vocals and a "powerful and melodic voice that's just right for some bluesy folk rock". The release received some positive notoriety including being featured on TuneCore's featured artist blog.

==== Can't Curse the Free (2017) ====
The 2nd single and title track from the 2017 album "Can't Curse the Free", released on January 13, 2017, to coincide with Jetty Rae's 30th birthday. The track has a running time of 3:28 and Rae cites the inspiration for the song as coming from her younger brother who asked her to write a song about someone who is cursed. Rae describes the content of the song as "about a mighty foe. The king of lies, who wants you to stay in darkness, confusion, and shame". It was recorded in just 3 takes.

The track has been described as "a haunting tune, equal parts soul and indie rock" and "spooky, and hauntingly vulnerable" while others have noted Rae's "smooth and vibrant voice."

The work received positive reception, being featured by Tunecore and by iTunes.

==== Take me to the Mountain (2017) ====
The 3rd single from the 2017 album "Can't Curse the Free", released on February 3, 2017. The track has a running time of 04:37.

The track has been described as "grounded and homely" and "haunting goosebump inducing soul fused with indie rock and laced with speckles of pop".

=== Stardust (2018) ===
Initially released on PledgeMusic on November 21, 2018, the album has a running time of about 31 minutes. It is Jetty's second self-produced children's album, however unlike the first this one was recorded in her vintage Airstream travel trailer while visiting a national park.

All music is composed by Brittni Stewart.

No.	Title	Lyrics	Length
1.	"Animal Fair"		2:44
2.	"Stardust"		3:29
3.	"Let's Go Fly a Kite"		3:09
4.	"Sophia"		3:46
5.	"Honestly"		2:49
6.	"You Raise Me Up"	Brendan Graham	4:14
7.	"Strawberry Cream Peaches Delight"		2:35
8.	"I Got You Babe"	Sonny Bono	3:47
9.	"Seasons Lament"		5:22
Total length:			31:00

=== We Share the Light (2019) ===
Rae's second Christmas album, a five-song EP, was released on November 15, 2019, and has a running time of about 15 minutes. The album was composed and recorded in Nashville at Sputnik Sound under the production of Mitch Dane. It features four holiday classics and one original song. Hannah Miller is also a collaborator on this album.

All music is composed by Jetty Rae, Mitch Dane.

No.	Title	Lyrics	Featuring	Length
1.	"O Come, O Come, Emmanuel"			2:48
2.	"The First Noel"			2:40
3.	"Carol of the Bells"			3:01
4.	"God Rest Ye Merry Gentlemen"		Hannah Miller	2:52
5.	"We Share the Light"	Brittni Stewart, Mitch Dane		3:31
Total length:				15:00

== Awards and recognition ==
- Winner, CMJ Music Showcase
- Winner, Musician Category, "Best Of Northern Michigan" Contest
- Winner, "Mi Favorite Things" TV Contest
- Winner, MoFilm Battle of the Bands
- Winner, Lilith Fair Talent Search
- Grand Prize, Live at T5 Music Competition
- Winner, MTV "Needle in a Haystack" Music Series
- 1st place, OurStage.com Folk Competition (January 2010, September 2009, May 2009)
- Grand Prize, OurStage.com Music Competition
- Michigan Women Who Rock

== Film, Commercial and Video Game Placements ==
- Original jingle for Truvia "Twinkle, Twinkle" (15s), Spring 2012.
- Original jingle for Truvia "Twinkle, Twinkle" (30s), Spring 2012.
- Original jingle for Truvia "Jiggle Bells" (15s), Winter 2011.
- Original jingle for Truvia "Hush", Spring 2011.
- Music for Film "Meah Lane", 2013.
- "Climbing Clouds" for Microsoft – Office 365, September 2014.
- "Imagine" for Nabi – Tablet, March 2014
- "Favorite Songs" for Petco – Westminster Kennel Club Dog Show, August 2013
- "Favorite Songs" for Petco – PuPQuiz!, February 2014
- "Favorite Songs" for Petco – PuPQuiz!, February 2014
- "Airplane" for Ben and Jerry's, January 2015
- Original Composition 'It Just Means More" for Southeastern Conference, September 2016
- "Climbing Clouds" for Saxo Bank, September 2016 and July 2017
- Original Composition 'It Just Means More" v2 for Southeastern Conference, December 2016.
- "Coast to Coast" for MasterCraft in July 2017
- "Coast to Coast" for Amazon.com in April 2017
- "Freedom", "Queen of the Universe" and "Take my to the Mountain" for Rebel Galaxy Outlaw (Video Game)
