= Heath McNease =

American Christian hip hop/folk rock musician

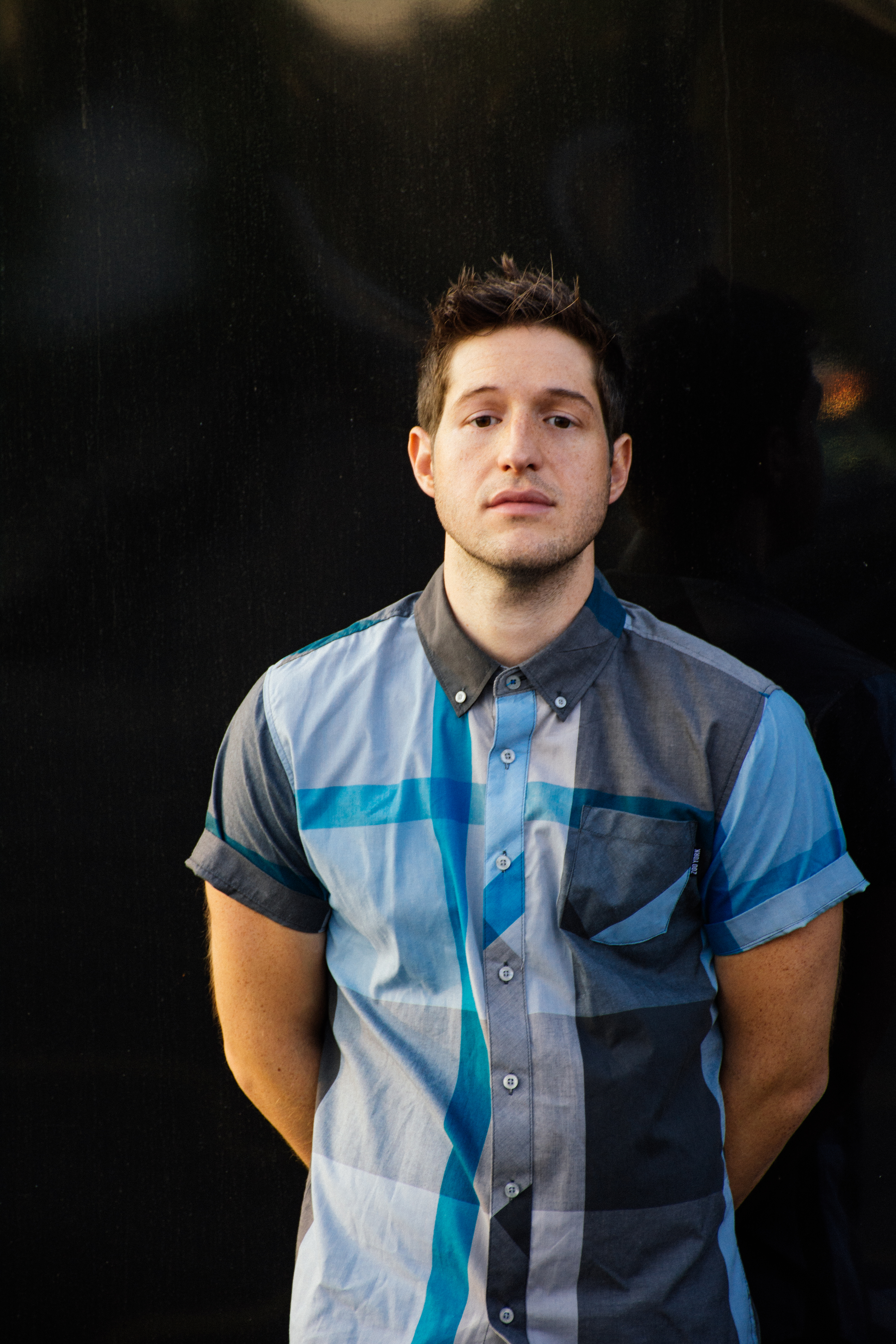
- McNease in 2014

Background information
- Born: Heath Daniel McNease; Colquitt, Georgia
- Genres: Christian hip hop, folk rock, contemporary worship music
- Occupations: Singer, songwriter
- Instrument: Singing
- Years active: 2005–present
- Label: 7Spin
- Website: heathmcneasemusic.com

Heath Daniel McNease is an American Christian hip hop and folk rock musician. He released four albums with 7Spin Music, two of those hip hop releases, The Heath McNease Fanclub Meets in 2007 and The Gun Show in 2010, while he released two folk rock roots releases, The House Always Wins in 2010 and Shine On in 2010. The remainder of his albums have been released independently. He released four hip hop albums, Straight Outta Console: The Nintendo Thumb Mixtape in 2011, Thrift Store Jesus in 2012, Jesus Shuttlesworth: The Mixtape and The Weight of Glory: Second Edition (A Hip Hop Remix Inspired by the Works of C.S. Lewis) in 2013, and Among Thieves in 2014, while two were folk rock roots releases, The Weight of Glory – Songs Inspired by the Works of C.S. Lewis in 2012, and Fort Wayne in 2014.

== Early life ==
McNease was born Heath Daniel McNease in Colquitt, Georgia. His parents raised him and his siblings in the church, where his father was a deacon, and his mother was the choir director. The hip hop influence was imparted to him by his two older brothers, while a cousin, and his mother in particular, got him listening to folk rock music. McNease graduated from Miller County High School, and went on to graduate from Bainbridge State College. Two years later, he obtained his Bachelor of Fine Arts degree from Valdosta State University.

== Music career ==
He started his music recording career in 2005, with his first studio album, The Heath McNease Fanclub Meets Tonight, which was released by 7Spin Music on April 24, 2007. The subsequent two studio albums, Shine On and The Gun Show, were released on the same day, May 4, 2010, from 7Spin Music. His next release, The House Always Wins, released by 7Spin Music on February 22, 2011, was his last release with the aforementioned label.

The next release, a mix tape, Straight Outta Console: The Nintendo Thumb Mixtape, was independently released on July 3, 2011, and all of his forthcoming releases would be released independently. His follow-up release, Thrift Store Jesus, was released on February 28, 2012. The forthcoming release, The Weight of Glory – Songs Inspired by the Works of C.S. Lewis, was released on August 14, 2012. He released Jesus Shuttlesworth: The Mixtape, another mix tape, on February 19, 2013. There was another release, on January 10, 2013, The Weight of Glory: Second Edition (A Hip Hop Remix Inspired by the Works of CS Lewis). He released two albums in 2014, the first, Fort Wayne, on September 23. The second, Among Thieves, was released on November 18. He released an extended play, Salem Songs, his third EP, on October 22, 2015.

== Discography ==
Studio albums

- The Heath McNease Fan Club Meets Tonight (April 24, 2007, 7Spin, hip hop)
- Shine On (May 4, 2010, 7Spin, folk rock)
- The Gun Show (May 4, 2010, 7Spin, hip hop)
- The House Always Wins (February 22, 2011, folk rock)

Independent albums

- Thrift Store Jesus (February 28, 2012, hip hop)
- The Weight of Glory – Songs Inspired by the Works of C.S. Lewis (August 14, 2012, folk rock)
- The Weight of Glory: Second Edition (A Hip Hop Remix Inspired by the Works of C.S. Lewis) (January 10, 2013, hip hop)
- Fort Wayne (September 23, 2014, folk rock)
- Among Thieves (November 18, 2014, hip hop)

Mix tapes

- Straight Outta Console: The Nintendo Thumb Mixtape (July 3, 2011, hip hop)
- Jesus Shuttlesworth: The Mixtape (December 11, 2012, hip hop)

EPs

- Losing Daylight (October 30, 2012, independent, folk rock)
- Gold (September 18, 2015, Collaboration with Jetty Rae, as Pen Pals)
- Salem Songs (October 22, 2015, independent, folk rock)
- "Who Knows? Who Cares? (August 10, 2016, independent, hip hop)
