= Happy Camp, California =

Happy Camp, California athithúf-vuunupma
- census-designated place
- Location of Happy Camp in Siskiyou County, California

- Location within the state of California
- Coordinates: 41°47′48″N 123°22′31″W
- Country: United States
- State: California
- County: Siskiyou

Area
  - Total: 12.346 sq mi (31.976 km^{2})
  - Land: 12.107 sq mi (31.357 km^{2})
  - Water: 0.239 sq mi (0.619 km^{2}) 1.94%
- Elevation: 1,657 ft (505 m)

Population (2020)
  - Total: 905
  - Density: 74.8/sq mi (28.9/km^{2})
- Time zone: UTC-8 (PST)
  - Summer (DST): UTC-7 (PDT)
- ZIP Code: 96039
- Area code: 530
- FIPS code: 06-32030

Happy Camp (Karuk: athithúf-vuunupma) is a census-designated place (CDP) in Siskiyou County, California, United States. Its population is 905 as of the 2020 census, down from 1,190 from the 2010 census.

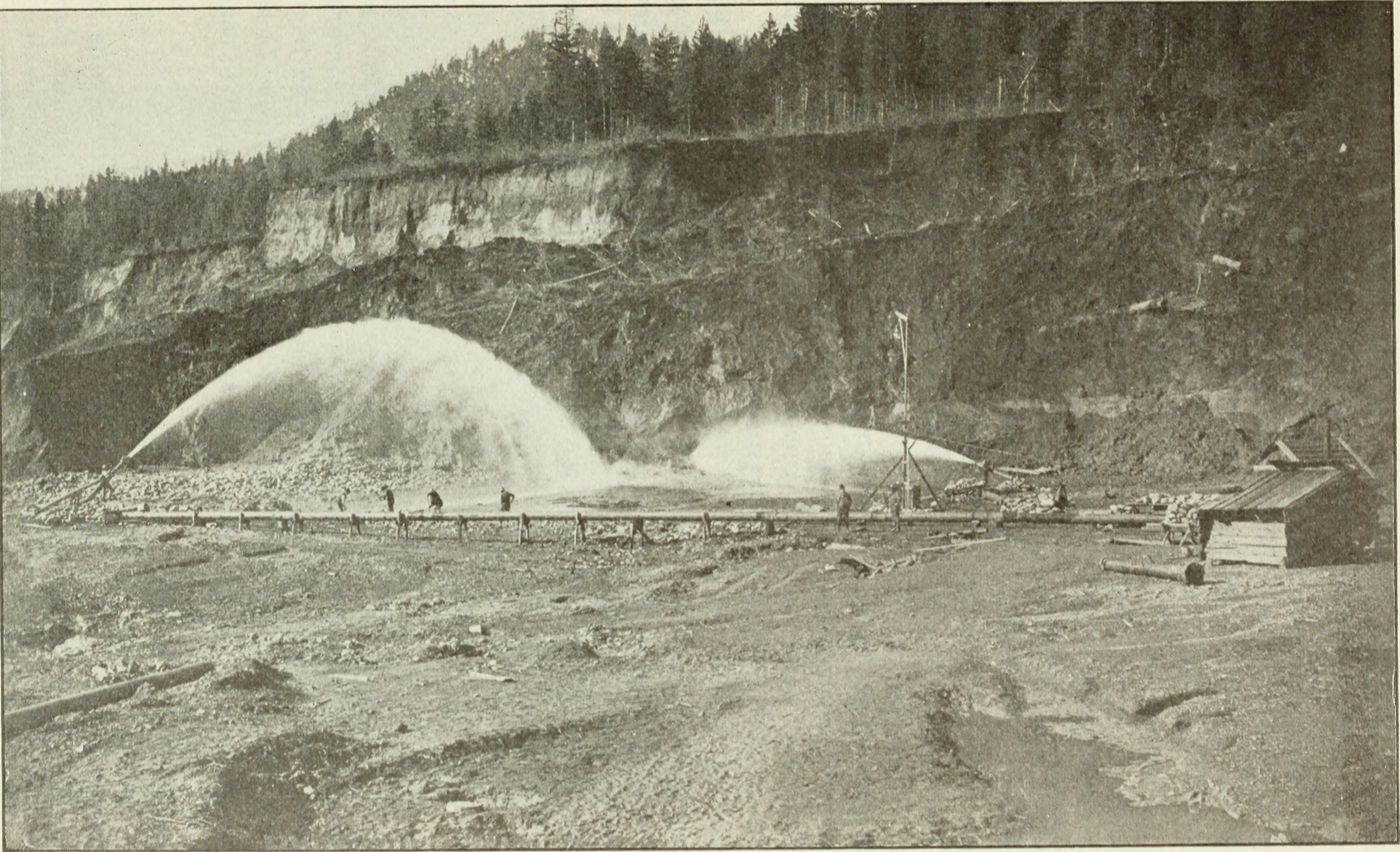
Seeking platinum by hydraulic mining in the early days of Happy Camp

The town of Happy Camp, "The Heart of the Klamath," is located on State Route 96, about 70 miles (110 km) west of Interstate 5 and 100 miles (160 km) northeast of Willow Creek. The town of Takilma, Oregon is accessible from Happy Camp (which is nearly 40 miles (64 km) away). The shortest route to Oregon, over the Grey Back Pass, is a seasonal summer road and is not cleared or maintained in snowy conditions. The Forest Service, located in Happy Camp on SR 96, provides road closure information.

== Name ==
Happy Camp was so named by California gold rush miners in the early days of prosperity. It has frequently been noted on lists of unusual place names. H.C. Chester, who interviewed Jack Titus in 1882–83, states that Titus named the camp because his partner James Camp, upon arriving there, exclaimed, "This is the happiest day in my life." Redick McKee mentions the camp on November 8, 1851, as "Mr Roache's Happy Camp" at the place known as Murderer's Bar. (Indian Report 1853:178)

== Geography ==
Happy Camp sits on the Klamath River and a nexus of creeks including Elk Creek, Little Grider Creek, Indian Creek, Doolittle Creek, Ikes Creek, Deer Lick Creek and Cade Creek.

According to the United States Census Bureau, the CDP covers an area of 12.3 square miles (32 km^{2}), of which 12.1 square miles (31 km^{2}) is land and 0.2 square miles (0.52 km^{2}) (1.94%) is water.

The town of Happy Camp is also known as the "Gateway to the Marbles". There are many trailheads for this wilderness area within 10 miles (16 km) of the town for which the U.S. Forest Service provides trail information. The Marble Mountains cover thousands of acres, and contain almost one hundred lakes. Among the most interesting lakes are Spirit Lake, which contains a luminescent chemical and has been seen to "glow" in the dark; Ukonom Lake, which is very large and beautiful even though the area is recovering from fire damage; and the Green and Blue Granite Lakes, where trout swim in the cold and clear waters. Deer, bears, elk, and mountain lions are common here.

== Demographics ==
The 2020 United States census reported that Happy Camp had a population of 905. The population density was 74.8 inhabitants per square mile (28.9/km^{2}). The racial makeup of Happy Camp was 483 (53.4%) White, 5 (0.6%) African American, 289 (31.9%) Native American, 2 (0.2%) Asian, 1 (0.1%) Pacific Islander, 30 (3.3%) from other races, and 95 (10.5%) from two or more races. Hispanic or Latino of any race were 73 persons (8.1%).

The whole population lived in households. There were 405 households, out of which 56 (13.8%) had children under the age of 18 living in them, 136 (33.6%) were married-couple households, 40 (9.9%) were cohabiting couple households, 108 (26.7%) had a female householder with no partner present, and 121 (29.9%) had a male householder with no partner present. 164 households (40.5%) were one person, and 80 (19.8%) were one person aged 65 or older. The average household size was 2.23. There were 197 families (48.6% of all households).

The age distribution was 171 people (18.9%) under the age of 18, 41 people (4.5%) aged 18 to 24, 202 people (22.3%) aged 25 to 44, 249 people (27.5%) aged 45 to 64, and 242 people (26.7%) who were 65 years of age or older. The median age was 49.7 years. For every 100 females, there were 100.7 males.

There were 505 housing units at an average density of 41.7 units per square mile (16.1 units/km^{2}), of which 405 (80.2%) were occupied. Of these, 243 (60.0%) were owner-occupied, and 162 (40.0%) were occupied by renters.

The Bigfoot Jamboree is an annual festival hosted by the Happy Camp Community Council. Happy Camp is situated along the "Bigfoot Scenic Byway," an 89-mile stretch of California State Route 96 named by the United States Forest Service. The town has an 18-foot-tall Bigfoot statue made of recycled metal.

== Climate ==
Happy Camp has a mediterranean climate. It is marked by very hot summer days, being shielded in the valley behind the mountains from the cooling Pacific influence affecting nearby coastal locations. The winters are much cooler and snowier than in inland locations further south, albeit still very mild compared to areas in the east of the continent. The dry and hot summers can fuel the abundant vegetation from the rainy winters, make the surrounding forest prone to wildfires, as occurred during the 2014 Happy Camp Complex Fire, which took months to extinguish and burned nearly to the Oregon border. High winter rainfall, however, keeps the area greener than its summer climate would suggest. Average lows remain cool year-round, relieving the intense daytime heat and keeping the average July temperature at around 73 °F (23 °C), in sharp contrast to the 95 °F (35 °C) average highs.

Climate data for Happy Camp
Month	Jan	Feb	Mar	Apr	May	Jun	Jul	Aug	Sep	Oct	Nov	Dec	Year
Record high °F (°C)	64.9 (18.3)	80.1 (26.7)	91.9 (33.3)	95 (35)	108.0 (42.2)	111.9 (44.4)	115.0 (46.1)	115.0 (46.1)	109.9 (43.3)	100.0 (37.8)	82.0 (27.8)	69.1 (20.6)	115.0 (46.1)
Mean daily maximum °F (°C)	46.2 (7.9)	53.8 (12.1)	61.0 (16.1)	70.0 (21.1)	77.7 (25.4)	85.6 (29.8)	95 (35)	94.1 (34.5)	86.9 (30.5)	72.1 (22.3)	56.1 (13.4)	46.9 (8.3)	70.5 (21.4)
Daily mean °F (°C)	38.7 (3.7)	43.3 (6.3)	47.7 (8.7)	53.8 (12.1)	59.7 (15.4)	66.4 (19.1)	73.0 (22.8)	72.0 (22.2)	66.0 (18.9)	56.1 (13.4)	45.7 (7.6)	39.9 (4.4)	55.2 (12.9)
Mean daily minimum °F (°C)	30.7 (−0.7)	33.1 (0.6)	34.3 (1.3)	37.6 (3.1)	42.1 (5.6)	46.9 (8.3)	51.3 (10.7)	49.8 (9.9)	45.1 (7.3)	39.9 (4.4)	35.8 (2.1)	33.1 (0.6)	40.0 (4.4)
Record low °F (°C)	6.1 (−14.4)	6.1 (−14.4)	19.0 (−7.2)	21.9 (−5.6)	21.9 (−5.6)	27.0 (−2.8)	28.0 (−2.2)	30.0 (−1.1)	24.1 (−4.4)	18.0 (−7.8)	10.0 (−12.2)	−2.0 (−18.9)	−2.0 (−18.9)
Average precipitation inches (mm)	9.5 (241)	7.1 (181)	5.9 (149)	2.8 (72)	1.7 (43)	0.8 (21)	0.4 (9)	0.4 (9)	0.9 (23)	3.3 (85)	7.3 (186)	9.4 (238)	49.5 (1,257)
Average snowfall inches (cm)	9.2 (23)	3.1 (7.9)	1.7 (4.3)	0.2 (0.51)	0 (0)	0 (0)	0 (0)	0 (0)	0 (0)	0 (0)	0.8 (2.0)	4.7 (12)	19.7 (50)
Average precipitation days	14	12	12	9	7	4	1	2	3	7	11	13	95

== Economy ==
The Karuk Tribe is headquartered in Happy Camp. The U.S. Forest Service maintains an office in town. Happy Camp is the administrative site for the Happy Camp/Oak Knoll Ranger Districts of the Klamath National Forest.

== Education ==
- Happy Camp Elementary School
- Happy Camp High School

== Government ==
In the state legislature Happy Camp is in the 1st senatorial district, represented by Republican Megan Dahle, and the 1st Assembly district, represented by Republican Heather Hadwick.

Federally, Happy Camp is in California's 1st congressional district, represented by Republican James Gallagher.

=== Klamath River ===
Gold prospectors, conservation groups, the California Department of Fish and Game, the U.S. Forest Service, and the Karuk, Hupa (Hoopa) and Yurok tribes are at odds with each other over what constitutes fair and ethical use of the river. The range of issues includes property rights, endangered species, and Native American civil rights.

== Notable people ==
- Daniel R. Hokanson, general in the United States Army
- Jetty Rae, musician and independent artist, lived in Happy Camp during her childhood
- Ricky Ray, pro-football quarterback, was born in Happy Camp and went to Shasta High and Shasta College
