= Karuk language =

Endangered language of California, US

Karuk
- Karok
- Araráhih
- Native to: United States
- Region: Northwestern California
- Ethnicity: Karuk
- Native speakers: 12 (2007)
- Revival: 30 L2 speakers (2007)
- Language family: Language isolate (Hokan?): Karuk
- Writing system: Latin

Language codes
- ISO 639-3: kyh
- Glottolog: karo1304
- ELP: Karuk
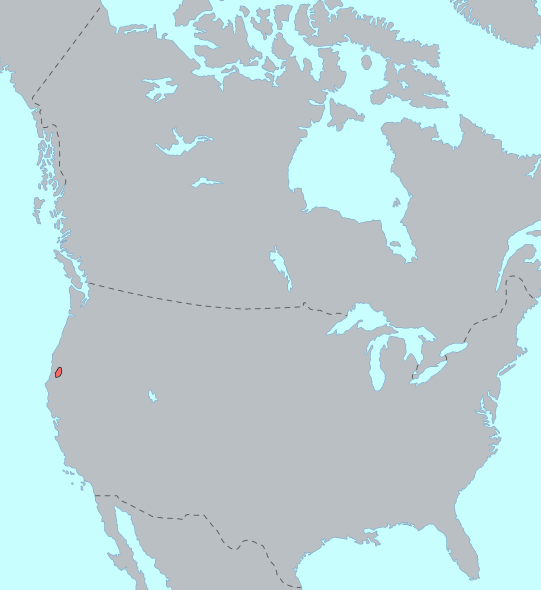

- Karuk is classified as Severely Endangered by the UNESCO Atlas of the World's Languages in Danger.

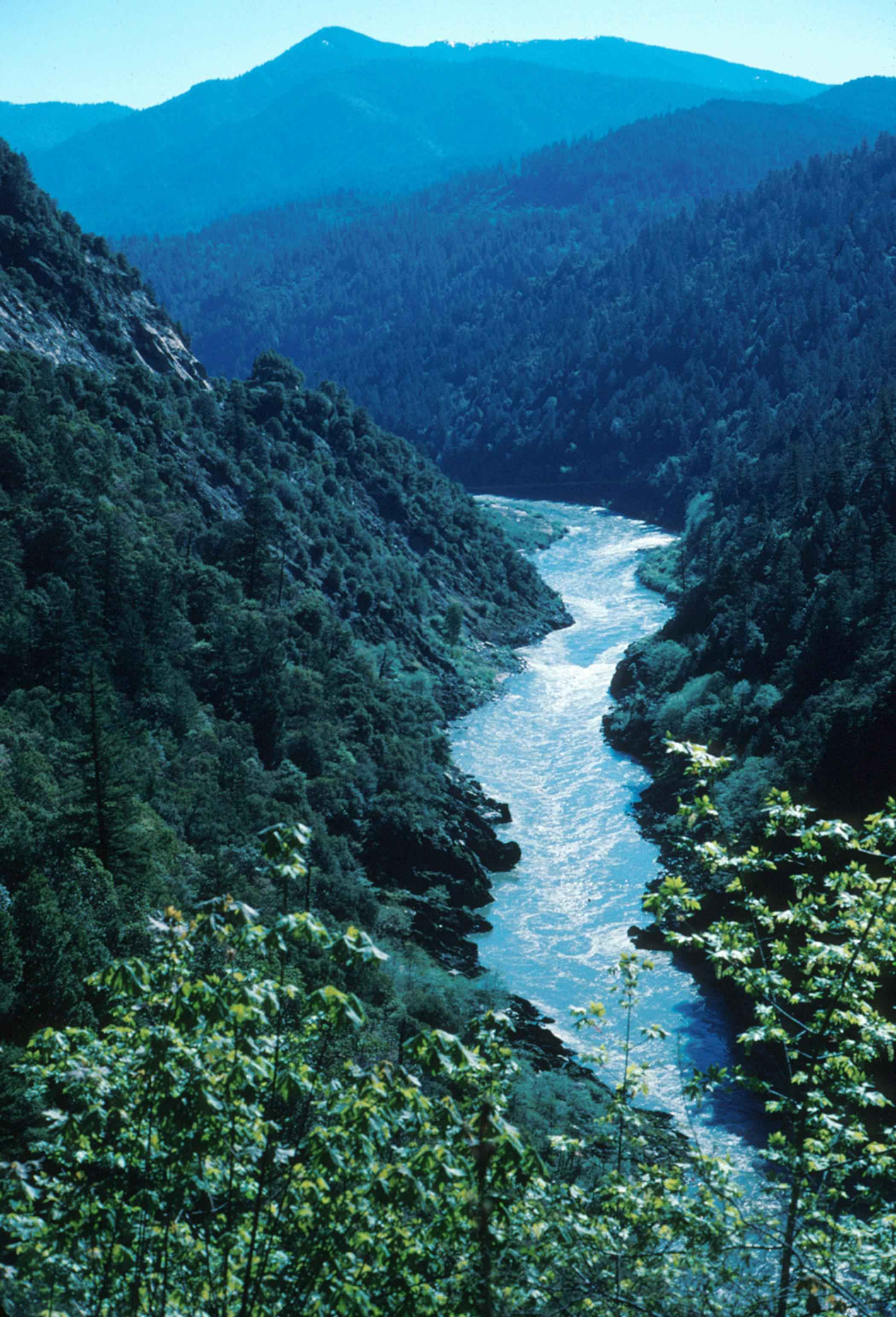
Klamath River in California

Karuk or Karok (Karok: Araráhih or Ararahihʼuripih) is the traditional language of the Karuk people in the region surrounding the Klamath River, in Northwestern California. The name 'Karuk' is derived from the Karuk word káruk, meaning "upriver".

Karuk is classified as severely endangered by UNESCO with only around 12 fluent native speakers of the language left. Most members of the Karuk nation now use English in their everyday lives. Since 1949, there have been efforts to revitalize the language and increase the number of speakers led by linguists such as Dr. William Bright and Susan Gehr, as well as members of the Karuk community.

== History and usage ==
The Karuk language originated around the Klamath River between Seiad Valley and Bluff Creek. Before European contact, it is estimated that there may have been up to 1,500 speakers. Linguist William Bright documented the Karuk language. When Bright began his studies in 1949, there were "a couple of hundred fluent speakers," but by 2011, there were fewer than a dozen fluent elders. A standardized system for writing the languages was adopted in the 1980s.

The region where the Karuk tribe lived remained largely undisturbed until beaver trappers came through the area in 1827. In 1848, gold was discovered in California, and thousands of Europeans came to the Klamath River and its surrounding region to search for gold. The Karuk territory was soon filled with mining towns, manufacturing communities, and farms. The salmon that the tribe relied on for food became less plentiful because of contamination in the water from mining, and many members of the Karuk tribe died from either starvation or new diseases that the Europeans brought with them to the area. Many members of the Karuk tribe were also killed or sold into slavery by the Europeans. Karuk children were sent to boarding schools where they were Americanized and told not to use their native language. These combined factors caused the use of the Karuk language to steadily decline over the years until measures were taken to attempt to revitalize the language.

== Classification ==
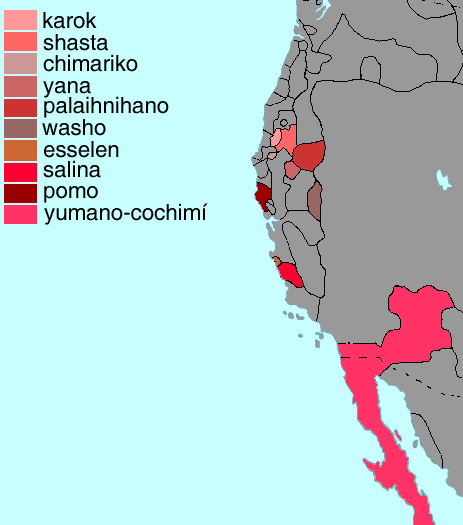
Hokan languages

Karuk is a language isolate, sharing few if any similarities with other nearby languages. Historically, the American linguist Edward Sapir proposed it be classified as part of the Hokan family, although little evidence supports this proposal. As Bright wrote, "The Karok language is not closely or obviously related to any other (in the area), but has been classified as a member of the northern group of Hokan languages, in a subgroup which includes Chimariko and the Shasta languages, spoken in the same general part of California as Karok itself."

== Geographic distribution ==
Karuk is spoken within the range of the original territory where the Karuk people lived prior to European contact. The ancestral territory is in Northwestern California in Siskiyou, Humboldt, and Del Norte counties. The language originated around the Klamath River between Seiad Valley and Bluff Creek. Most Karuk speakers now live in the towns of Somes Bar, which is near the Karuk Center of the World (in Karuk, "Katimiin"), Happy Camp ("Athithufvuunupma"), and Orleans ("Panamniik").

The Karuk people originally owned 1.04 million acres of land until it was claimed as public territory in 1905 under the Forest Reserve Act during the Roosevelt administration. In 1887, some members of the Karuk tribe were given small plots of land under the General Allotment Act. In the 1970s, elders from the Karuk tribe bought back two properties in Orleans and Happy Camp and have acquired 1,661 acres of land that the tribe can use for ceremonies, housing, and resource management.

== Phonology ==
=== Vowels ===
	Front		Central		Back	
	short	long	short	long	short	long
Close	i	iː			u	uː
Mid		eː				oː
Open			a	aː		

There are 5 vowel qualities in Karuk /i e a o u/, some of which may also differ in terms of length. Vowel qualities /a i u/ occur as both long and short vowels, while mid vowels /e o/ only occur as long vowels.

=== Consonants ===
	Bilabial	Labio- dental	Dental	Alveolar	Palatal	Velar	Glottal
Nasal	m			n			
Stop	p			t	t͡ʃ	k	ʔ
Fricative	β	f	θ	s	(ʃ)	x	h
Flap				ɾ			
Approximant					j		

Karuk has 16 phonemic consonants (all of them with no voicing contrast), a small number compared to the relatively large consonant inventories of most California languages. Karuk also lacks secondary articulation to its consonants such as glottalization or labialization, also unusual for a Californian language.

=== Tones ===
Karuk has a tone system consisting of three tones: high, low, and falling. Falling tones only occur in long vowels.

Karuk vowel stress
Description	IPA	Spelling
high-falling tone	/âː/	âa
high tone	/á/ /áː/	á áa
low tone	/à/ /àː/	a aa

=== Syllable structure ===
When /i u/ occur next to one another in a word, whichever is the first vowel is pronounced as a glide, as in the following examples.

First Vowel	Glide Transition	English Translation
/imuira/	[imwira]	fishery
/imiuha/	[imjúha]	soap plant
/suniiθih/	[sunjíθih]	nut of a giant chinquapin

Note: Syllabification in these examples is from right to left.

The following example is a more rare case in Karuk where the syllabification is from left-to-right.

First Vowel	Glide Transition	English Translation
/uiriwsaw/	[wíriwʃaw]	to bequeath to

== Orthography ==
Karuk consonants have been historically written using several different conventions. A comparison between these conventions follows:

Karuk consonants
Spelling				Phoneme
Modern	Bright	Harrington (typed)	Harrington (notes)	Phoneme
p				p
t				t
ch	č	tc		ʧ
k				k
ʼ	ʔ	ʼ ? ʔ	ʼ ʔ	ʔ
f				f
th	θ			θ
s				s
sh	š	cc		ʃ
x			q	x
h		h ʼ		h
v				β
r				ɾ
y				j
m				m
n				n
Modern	Bright	Harrington (typed)	Harrington (notes)	Phoneme

In two-consonant sequences [sh] or [th] are distinguished from the digraphs ⟨sh th⟩ which represent the single phonemes /ʃ θ/ with the use of a hyphen ⟨s-h t-h⟩.

=== Vowels ===
Long vowels are represented by doubling the letters: ⟨ii⟩, ⟨aa ⟩ and ⟨uu⟩ are used for /iː/ /aː/ and /uː/.

Tones are marked for vowels in Karuk using accent marks. The high and falling tones are represented using the acute and circumflex diacritics, respectively, above the vowels. The low tone is not represented, and tones on long vowels are notated only on the first letter in the digraph.

== Grammar ==
Karuk is a polysynthetic language known for its method of arranging old and new information: "... skilled Karuk speakers use separate words to communicate new, salient detail, or to underscore known detail; and they use affixes for background details so that a listener's attention is not diverted."

=== Morphology ===
Karuk is similar to many other American Indian Languages in showing "a complex person-marking system, where subject and object are marked in portmanteau prefixes" on its verbs. Depending on the subject and the object the speaker is referring to, there is a prefix for both positive and negative indicatives as well as a prefix for the potential mood. Through his research, William Bright found the language lacks words for cardinal directions, but uses suffixes on verbs to describe relevant direction. Many motion verbs have a singular and plural form. Through morphology, long-form vowels are used when a is next to i or u. Karuk uses accents where vowels can sound different in each word, making the language difficult to learn. Although the structure may be similar, Karuk is considered to be very different from its neighboring languages, such as Yurok.

=== Verbs ===
Karuk uses prefixes and suffixes in a way William Bright relates to how English words snort, sniff, and sneeze all start with a sn-. The following are examples of prefixes in Karuk.

Karuk	English Translation
im-	involving heat or fire
impat	'to become broken due to heat'
imchak	'to get burnt'
imchax	'to be hot'
ʼak-	with the hand
ʼaknup	'to thump'
ʼaktuṽ	'to pluck at'
ʼakxárap	'to scratch'

== Words and phrases ==
From Dr. William Bright's research
Karuk	English Translation
xâatik vaa ukupítih	Let it do that
kári xás pihnêefich upiip, pûuhara.	Then coyote said, "no."
pihnêefich	coyote
túuyship	mountain
koovúra yúruk kámvuunupahitih.	Let it all flow downstream.

Note: More translations can be found online in the Dictionary section depicting Dr. Bright's research.

From Phil Albers, Jr.'s work
Karuk	English Translation
hãa	yes
pûuhara	no
taʼávahiv	time to eat
íikam	it's time to go outside
kaʼíru	be quiet/quiet down

== Revitalization efforts ==
=== Work by Dr. William Bright and Susan Gehr ===
Dr. William Bright started studying the Karuk language in 1949 in pursuit of his doctorate in linguistics at U.C Berkeley. Bright was met with open arms by tribal elders and was given the Karuk name Uhyanapatánvaanich, or "little word-asker". Around a decade later, Bright published The Karok Language, describing the Karuk language, its grammar, and syntax. Bright set himself apart from linguists from his time for incorporating elements of the cultural context of Karuk into his descriptions.

Bright later worked with Susan Gehr, a tribe member and fellow linguist, on a Karuk dictionary, which was published in 2005. They recorded everyday conversations, songs, stories, and poetry of fluent Karuk speakers to attempt to capture the language and what it meant to those speaking it. Bright spent over fifty years studying, researching, and documenting Karuk, and is the only non-Indian to be inducted as an honorary member of the tribe thanks to his contributions to the community. Bright was buried on Karuk land when he died in 2006.

=== Revival through education ===
==== American Indian Bilingual Teacher Credential Program ====
In the late 1980s, Humboldt State University started the "American Indian Bilingual Teacher Credential Program", where they brought in teachers from four local tribes, the Hupa, Yurok, Karuk, and Tolowa. These teachers were bilingual in their tribe's native language as well as English, and would be employed in local public schools to teach American Indian children. The university developed this initiative to help local American Indian populations either further develop their English for higher education or develop their native language to preserve culture. Bilingual teachers in both Karuk and English would teach at Orleans and Happy Camp Elementary Schools, where children would learn how to live in America while keeping their identity.

==== Karuk Language Restoration Committee ====
In 1990, attempts were made to revive the language by the Karuk Language Restoration Committee. The committee, composed of eight volunteers, drafted a 5-year minimum plan in an attempt to preserve the Karuk language and help it regain its standing in the community. The committee was advised by Dr. William Bright and tribal member Julian Lang, a dedicated researcher of the language. Their studies suggest that the decline of the language is caused by a combination of a lack of younger fluent speakers, a decline in the number of speakers, not being typically taught at home at young ages, a feeling of disconnect between its use and the contemporary world, and the lack of literacy in the language among tribal members.

The committee ultimately created a five-step plan:

1. Recording and writing down fluent speakers communicating in Karuk.
2. Training more people to become fluent as a long-term goal.
3. Raising tribal members' and local communities' aware of the importance of learning the language also as a vehicle of Karuk culture itself.
4. Reviewing and receiving community feedback regarding the current plan.
5. Facilitating the community participation in programs that have people practice and speak Karuk.

=== Master–apprentice program ===
An immersion method called the master–apprentice program was started in 1992 by Advocates for Indigenous California Language Survival to aid in Karuk revitalization efforts. In order to fully immerse a beginning speaker in Karuk, people who are interested in learning the language are paired with a fluent native speaker who they follow throughout the day. During this time spent with the native speaker, learners are only allowed to speak Karuk. The program is intensive, typically lasting 40 hours a week for 3 years. Around 20 groups had successfully gone through the entire program as of the year 2011.

== Dictionaries ==
- Karuk Dictionary Online Karuk dictionary hosted by UC Berkeley Linguistics.
- William Bright (2005). Karuk Dictionary. Los Angeles, CA.
