= Karuk =

Indigenous people of Oregon and California, US

káruk vaʼáraaras
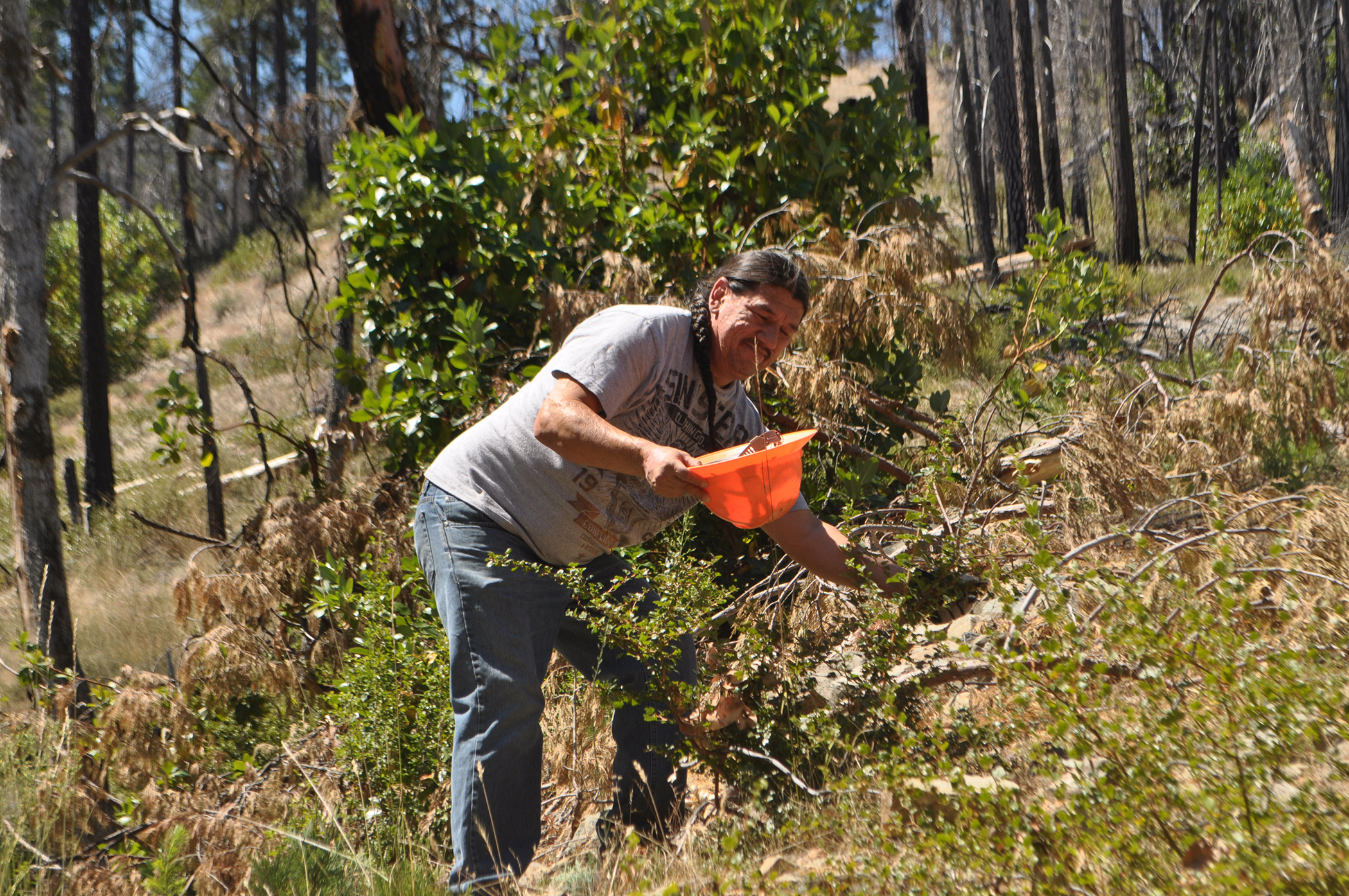
- Karuk leader Ron Reed collecting gooseberries (2014)

Total population
- 2010 census: 6,115 alone and in combination

Regions with significant populations
- California (Yreka, Happy Camp, Orleans), Oregon

Languages
- English, Karuk

Religion
- Christianity, other

Related ethnic groups
- Yurok

The Karuk people (Karok: káruk vaʼáraaras) are an Indigenous people of California, and the Karuk Tribe is one of the largest tribes in California. Karuks are also enrolled in two other federally recognized tribes, the Cher-Ae Heights Indian Community of the Trinidad Rancheria and the Quartz Valley Indian Community.

Happy Camp, California, is located in the heart of the Karuk Tribe's ancestral territory, which extends along the Klamath River from Bluff Creek (near the community of Orleans in Humboldt County) through Siskiyou County and into Southern Oregon.

== Name ==
The name káruk, also spelled "Karok," means "upriver", or "upstream", whereas the word yúruk means "downriver". Thus, the term káruk vaʼáraaras refers to Karuk people, literally meaning "upriver people", whereas the exonym of the Yurok people in English is derived from Karuk language term yúrukvâaras, meaning "downriver people".

Historically, káruk vaʼáraaras referred to any people from upriver of a reference point or person speaking. Traditionally, Karuk people referred to themselves as ithivthanéenʼaachip vaʼáraaras, meaning "middle of the world people".

Karuk people are called Chum-ne in the neighboring Tolowa language.

== Language ==
The Karuk people speak the Karuk language, a language isolate sometimes grouped into the proposed family of Hokan languages. The tribe has an active language revitalization program.

== Population ==
Estimates for the population sizes of most Native groups before European arrival in California have varied substantially. (Note: For estimates of population, see Population of Native California.) Alfred L. Kroeber proposed a population for the Karuk of 1,500 in 1770. Sherburne F. Cook initially estimated it as 2,000, later raising this figure to 2,700. In 1910, Kroeber reported the surviving population of the Karuk as 800.

According to the 2010 census, there were 6,115 Karuk individuals.

== Culture ==
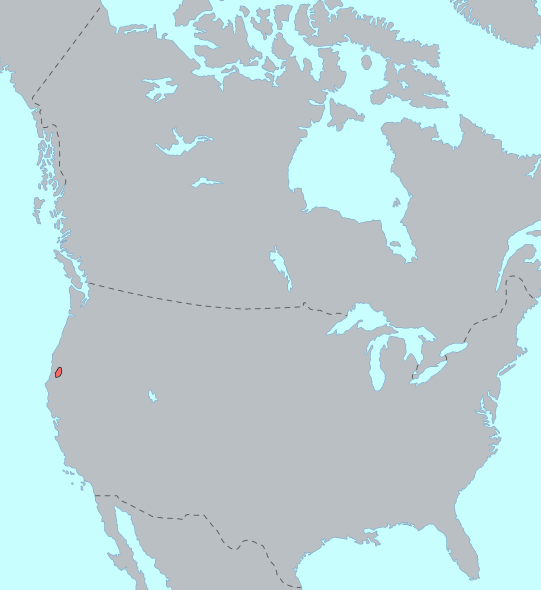
Pre-contact distribution of the Karuk

Since time immemorial, the Karuk resided in villages along the Klamath River, where they continue such cultural traditions as hunting, gathering, fishing, basketmaking and ceremonial dances. The Karuk were one among several California tribes to sow and harvest tobacco plants. The Brush Dance, Jump Dance and Pikyavish ceremonies last for several days and are practiced to heal and "fix the world," to pray for plentiful acorns, deer and salmon, and to restore social goodwill as well as individual good luck.

The Karuk developed sophisticated usage of plants and animals for their subsistence. These practices not only consisted of food harvesting from nature, but also the use of plant and animal materials as tools, clothing and pharmaceuticals. The Karuk cultivated a form of tobacco, and used fronds of the coastal woodfern (tiiptip'únuhich) as anti-microbial agents in the process of preparing eels for food consumption.

== In film ==
- Andrew Chambers. 2008. Pikyáv (to fix it). Documentary film produced for the Truly California series. KQED Public Television and C. Buried Star Productions.

== Notable Karuk people ==
- Rob Cabitto, author of a memoir about his struggles with identity and addiction.
- Naomi Lang, figure skater; five time US Champion in ice dancing from 1999 to 2003. As a member of the 2002 US Olympic figure skating team, she was the first Native American woman to compete in the Winter Olympics. Her great-great-grandmother, Bessie Tripp, was a full blooded Karuk from Orleans/Salmon River.
- Buck Martinez, former professional baseball player and current play-by-play broadcaster for the Toronto Blue Jays.
- Anthony Earl Numkena (Hopi/Karuk) (born 1942), actor, appeared in a number of films and television shows in the 1950s including being credited in Pony Soldier (1952) at the age of nine. His grandmother, Caroline Besoain, née Harrie, was three-quarters Karuk born in Somes Bar, California in 1899 and settled in Quartz Valley, California.
- Jetty Rae, musician whose grandmother, Jetty Rae Thom, was a full-blooded Karuk.
- Cutcha Risling Baldy, associate professor Cal Poly Humboldt
- Fox Anthony Spears, artist and printmaker who uses geometric designs inspired by Karuk basketry patterns. Commissioned to design warmup jersey patches for Seattle Kraken's Indigenous Peoples Night game in 2021.
- Brian D. Tripp (1945–2022) was a Native American artist and cultural advocate known for his work across murals, poetry, performance, and mixed-media, which reflected and promoted Karuk traditions. In 2000, Tripp, along with fellow artist Alme Allen, created the mural The Sun Set Twice on the People That Day in Eureka, California, which features Karuk cultural symbols. In recognition of his decades-long contributions to visual art, ceremonial performance, and the preservation of Karuk cultural practices, Tripp received the California Living Heritage Award from the Alliance for California Traditional Arts in 2018.

== See also ==
- Karuk language
- Karuk traditional narratives
